= List of American non-fiction environmental writers =

This is a list of American non-fiction environmental writers.

Author	Sex	Lifespan	Theme(s)	Selected book	Category
Edward Abbey	M	1927–1989	Various themes	The Monkey Wrench Gang	
Virginia Abernethy	F	1934–	Carrying capacity	Population Politics: The Choices that Shape our Future	
Terry L. Anderson	M	fl. 2000s	Free-market environmentalism	Free Market Environmentalism (co-authored)	
Ron Arnold	M	1937–2022	Natural resources		
Ed Ayres	M	b.1941	Various themes	God's Last Offer: Negotiating for a Sustainable Future	
Ronald Bailey	M	1953–	Global warming		
Bruce Barcott	M	fl. 1990s-2000s	Wildlife	The Measure of a Mountain: Beauty and Terror on Mount Rainier	
Peter Barnes	M	b.1940	Carbon emissions	Climate Solutions: A Citizen's Guide	
Albert Bates	M	1947–	Various themes	Climate in Crisis	
Art Bell	M	1945–2018	Climate change	The Coming Global Superstorm	
Tom Bender	M	fl. 1970s-2000s	Green architecture	Environmental Design Primer	
Wendell Berry	M	1934–	Sustainable agriculture, Agrarianism, Conservation	The Unsettling of America: Culture & Agriculture	
Henry Beston	M	1888–1968	Natural history	The Outermost House	
Robert O. Binnewies	M	1937–	Environmental protection	Palisades: 100,000 acres in 100 years	
Brian Black	M		Various themes	Petrolia: The Landscape of America's First Oil Boom	
H. Emerson Blake	M		Ecology		
Murray Bookchin	M	1921–2006	Social ecology	Our Synthetic Environment (pseudonymously)	
Stewart Brand	M	1938–	Various themes	Whole Earth Discipline: An Ecopragmatist Manifesto	
Lester R. Brown	M	1934–	Various themes	World on the Edge: How to Prevent Environmental and Economic Collapse	
Marilyn A. Brown	F		Various themes	Climate Change and Global Energy Security	
Michael Brune	M		Various themes	Coming Clean: Breaking America's Addiction to Oil and Coal	
Robert Bryce	M		Various themes	Power Hungry: The Myths of "Green" Energy and the Real Fuels of the Future	
Ernest Callenbach	M	1929–2012	Simple living		
David George Campbell	M	1949–	Tropical wildlife	A Land of Ghosts	
Archie Carr	M	1909–1987	Sea turtle conservation	A Naturalist in Florida	
Donald Eaton Carr	M	1903–1986	Air and water pollution	Death of the Sweet Waters	
Rachel Carson	F	1907–1964	Environmental impact of pesticides	Silent Spring	
Steve Chase	M		Environmental justice		
Ward Churchill	M	1947–	Indigenous land rights	Struggle for the Land: Native North American Resistance to Genocide, Ecocide and Colonization	
Theo Colborn	M		Endocrine disruptors	Our Stolen Future : How We Are Threatening Our Fertility, Intelligence and Survival (co-authored)	
Melissa Coleman	F	1969–	Back-to-the-land movement	This Life Is in Your Hands: One Dream, Sixty Acres, and a Family Undone	
Barry Commoner	M	1917–2012	Ecology	Making Peace with the Planet	
Philip Connors	M		Wilderness	Fire Season: Field Notes From a Wilderness Lookout	
Erik M. Conway	M				
Joseph Bharat Cornell	M		Outdoor education	Sharing Nature with Children	
Greg Craven	M		Climate change	What's the Worst That Could Happen?: A Rational Response to the Climate Change Debate	
Heidi Cullen	F		Climate change	The Weather of the Future: Heat Waves, Extreme Storms, and Other Scenes From a Climate-Changed Planet	
E. Kyle Datta	M		Renewable energy	Winning the Oil Endgame: Innovation for Profits, Jobs and Security (co-authored)	
Laurie David	M	1958–	Climate change	Stop Global Warming: The Solution Is You!	
Osha Gray Davidson	M	1954–	Natural history	The Enchanted Braid: Coming to Terms with Nature on the Coral Reef	
Kenneth S. Deffeyes	M		Peak oil	Hubbert's Peak	
Mark Derr	M		Environment of Florida	Some kind of paradise : a chronicle of man and the land in Florida	
Nate Dickinson	M	1932–2011	Wildlife management	Common Sense Wildlife Management: Discourses on Personal Experiences	
Marjory Stoneman Douglas	F	1890–1998	Everglades	The Everglades: River of Grass	
Morgan Downey	M		Oil	Oil 101	
K. Eric Drexler	M	1955–	Molecular nanotechnology	Engines of Creation: The Coming Era of Nanotechnology (not the foreword)	
Curtis Ebbesmeyer	M	1943–	Flotsam	Flotsametrics and the Floating World: How One Man's Obsession with Runaway Sneakers and Rubber Ducks Revolutionized Ocean Science	
Anne H. Ehrlich	F	1933–	Human overpopulation	The Stork and The Plow: The Equity Answer to the Human Dilemma (co-authored)	
Paul R. Ehrlich	M	1932–2026	Human overpopulation	Ecoscience: Population, Resources, Environment (co-authored)	
Daniel C. Esty	M		Environment of Connecticut	Green to Gold: How Smart Companies Use Environmental Strategy to Innovate, Create Value, and Build Competitive Advantage	
Dan Fagin	M	1963–	Environmental health	Toms River: A Story of Science and Salvation	
Arthur Firstenberg	M	1950–2025	Microwave engineering	Microwaving Our Planet: The Environmental Impact of the Wireless Revolution	
Christopher Flavin	M		Natural resources	Power Surge: Guide to the Coming Energy Revolution	
Paul Fleischmann	M	1952–		Eyes Wide Open: Going Behind the Environmental Headlines	
David Foreman	M	1946–2022	Wilderness	Ecodefense: A Field Guide To Monkeywrenching (not the foreword)	
Hilary French	F		Environmental analysis		
Thomas Friedman	M	1953–	Various themes	Hot, Flat, and Crowded: Why We Need a Green Revolution—And How It Can Renew America	
Howard Friel	M		Various themes	Cool It: The Skeptical Environmentalist's Guide to Global Warming	
Buckminster Fuller	M	1895–1983		Approaching the Benign Environment (co-authored)	Category:Books by Buckminster Fuller
Medard Gabel			Various themes	Environmental Design Science Primer	
Ross Gelbspan	M	1939–2024	Global warming	The Heat Is On	
Harold Gilliam	M		San Francisco Bay Area	Between the Devil & the Deep Blue Bay: The Struggle to Save San Francisco Bay	
Juan Gonzalez	M	1947–	Various themes	Fallout: The Environmental Consequences of the World Trade Center Collapse	
Jeff Goodell	M		Energy	Big Coal: The Dirty Secret Behind America's Energy Future	
David Goodstein	M	1939–2024	Fossil fuels	Out of Gas: The End of the Age of Oil	
Al Gore	M	1948–	Climate change	An Inconvenient Truth: The Planetary Emergency of Global Warming and What We Can Do About It	Category:Books by Al Gore
Dan Haifley	M		Oceanography		
John D. Hamaker	M	1914–1994	Various themes		
Terri Crawford Hansen	F	1953–	Indigenous rights		
Garrett Hardin	M	1915–2003	Human overpopulation	Living Within Limits: Ecology, Economics, and Population Taboos	
Jonathan Harr	M		Water pollution	A Civil Action	
Jonathan Baxter Harrison	M	1835–1907	Forests		
Paul Hawken	M	1946–	Environmental justice	Blessed Unrest: How the Largest Movement in the World Came into Being and Why No One Saw It Coming	
Richard Heinberg	M		Oil depletion	The Party's Over: Oil, War, and the Fate of Industrial Societies	
Lawrence Joseph Henderson	M	1878–1942	Environmental science	The Fitness of the Environment	
Julia Butterfly Hill	F	1974–	Clearcutting	The Legacy of Luna	
Erich Hoyt	M	1950–	Conservation: cetaceans	Marine Protected Areas for Whales, Dolphins and Porpoises	
Wes Jackson	M	1936–	Polyculture		
Derrick Jensen	M	1960–	Civilization	A Language Older Than Words	
Van Jones	M	1968–	Environmental economics	The Green Collar Economy: How One Solution Can Fix Our Two Biggest Problems	
Lierre Keith	F	1964–	Various themes	The Vegetarian Myth: Food, Justice, and Sustainability	
Kevin Kelly	M	1952–	Conservation movement	Out of Control: The New Biology of Machines, Social Systems, and the Economic World	
Robert F. Kennedy, Jr.	M	1954–	Environmental law	Crimes Against Nature : How George W. Bush and His Corporate Pals Are Plundering the Country and Hijacking Our Democracy	
Bruce Kershner	M	1950–2007	Old-growth forests	Sierra Club Guide to Ancient Forests of the Northeast	
Gilbert Klingel	M	1908–1983	Chesapeake Bay	The Bay	
Elizabeth Kolbert	F	1961–	Various themes	Field Notes from a Catastrophe	
David Korten	M	1937–	Globalization	When Corporations Rule the World	
Joel Kovel	M	1936–2018	Eco-socialism	The Enemy of Nature: The End of Capitalism or the End of the World?	
Bernie Krause	M	1938–	Acoustic ecology	The Great Animal Orchestra: Finding the Origins of Music in the World's Wild Places	
James Howard Kunstler	M	1948–	Various themes	The Geography of Nowhere: The Rise and Decline of America's Man-Made Landscape	
Joseph LaDou	M	1938–2023	Occupational and environmental medicine	Current Occupational and Environmental Medicine	
Winona LaDuke	F	1959–	Indigenous land rights	All our Relations: Native Struggles for Land and Life	
Richard Lamm	M	1935–2021		The Angry West: A Vulnerable Land and Its Future	
Aldo Leopold	M	1887–1948	Land ethic	A Sand County Almanac: And Sketches Here and There	
Amory Lovins	M	1947–	Energy policy	Reinventing Fire: Bold Business Solutions for the New Energy Era (co-authored)	Category:Books by Amory Lovins
Benton MacKaye	M	1879–1975	Conservation movement	The New Exploration: A Philosophy of Regional Planning	
Charles C. Mann	M	1955–	Science	1493: Uncovering the New World Columbus Created	
Michael E. Mann	M	1965–	Climate change	The Hockey Stick and the Climate Wars: Dispatches from the Front Lines	
Richard Manning	M	1951–	American prairie	Rewilding the West: Restoration in a Prairie Landscape	
Emma Marris	F	1979–	Environmentalism	Rambunctious Garden: Saving Nature in a Post-Wild World	
George Perkins Marsh	M	1801–1882	Conservationism	The Earth as Modified by Human Action	
Anne Matthews	F		Various themes	Where the Buffalo Roam: Restoring America's Great Plains	
Timothy R. McClanahan	M		Ecology: coral reefs	Coral Reefs of the Indian Ocean: Their Ecology and Conservation	
Michael J. McGuire	M	1947–	Drinking water quality standards		
Stephen McIntyre	M	1947–	Temperature record of the past 1000 years		
Bill McKibben	M	1960–	Global warming	The End of Nature	
Barbara McMartin	F	1931–2005	Adirondack Park	The Great Forest of the Adirondacks	
Tom McNamee	M	1947–	Conservation biology	Nature First: Keeping Our Wild Places and Wild Creatures Wild	
John McPhee	M	1931–	Various themes	The Control of Nature	
Dennis Meadows	M	1942–	Environmental economics	The Limits to Growth (co-authored)	
Donella Meadows	F	1941–2001		The Limits to Growth (co-authored)	
George J. Mitchell	M	1933–		World on Fire: Saving an Endangered Earth	
Chris Mooney	M	1977–	Various themes	Storm World: Hurricanes, Politics, and the Battle Over Global Warming	
Ted Nace	M	1956–	Coal industry	Climate Hope: On the Front Lines of the Fight Against Coal	
Ralph Nader	M	1934–	Environmental economics	Unsafe at Any Speed: The Designed-In Dangers of the American Automobile	Category:Works by Ralph Nader
Richard B. Norgaard	M	1943–	Ecological economics	An Introduction to Ecological Economics	
Naomi Oreskes	F		Global warming	Merchants of Doubt (co-authored)	
Henry Fairfield Osborn, Jr.	M	1887–1969	Conservation movement	Our Plundered Planet	
Riki Ott	F		Aquatic toxicology	Sound Truth and Corporate Myth$: The Legacy of the Exxon Valdez Oil Spill	
David Naguib Pellow	M	1969–	Various themes	Garbage Wars: The Struggle for Environmental Justice in Chicago	
Ron Pernick	M		Clean technology	The Clean Tech Revolution (co-authored)	
Frederik Pohl	M	1919–2013		Our Angry Earth: A Ticking Ecological Bomb (co-authored)	Category:Books by Frederik Pohl
Michael Pollan	M	1955–	Food	The Omnivore's Dilemma: A Natural History of Four Meals	Category:Books by Michael Pollan
Carl Pope	M		Various themes	Strategic Ignorance: Why the Bush Administration Is Recklessly Destroying a Century of Environmental Progress (co-authored)	
Richard Posner	M	1939–	Various themes	Catastrophe: Risk and Response	
Sandra Postel	F		Fresh water		
Robert Michael Pyle	M	1947–	Forests	Wintergreen	
Stephen J. Pyne	M		Forests: wildfires	Awful Splendour: A Fire History of Canada	
Ray Raphael	M	1943–	Environment of California	Edges: Human Ecology of the Backcountry	
Paul Rauber	M			Strategic Ignorance: Why the Bush Administration Is Recklessly Destroying a Century of Environmental Progress	
Andrew Revkin	M		Global warming	The North Pole Was Here: Puzzles and Perils at the Top of the World	
Jeremy Rifkin	M	1945–	Various themes	The Green Lifestyle Handbook: 1001 Ways to Heal the Earth (edited by Rifkin)	
Paul Roberts	M		Various themes	The End of Oil: On the Edge of a Perilous New World	
Joseph J. Romm	M	1960–2026	Energy	The Hype about Hydrogen: Fact and Fiction in the Race to Save the Climate	
Jonathan F.P. Rose	M	1952–	Various themes	The Well-Tempered City: What Modern Science, Ancient Civilizations, and Human Nature Teach Us About the Future of Urban Life	
Donald K. Ross	M				
William Ruddiman	M		Paleoclimatology	Plows, Plagues and Petroleum: How Humans Took Control of Climate	
Kirkpatrick Sale	M	1937–	Various themes	The Green Revolution: The American Environmental Movement	
Jonathan Schell	M	1943–2014	Nuclear weapons	The Gift of Time: The Case for Abolishing Nuclear Weapons Now	
Auden Schendler	M		Sustainability	Getting Green Done	
J. Michael Scott	M	1941–	Wildlife		
Julian Simon	M	1932–1998	Carrying capacity	The Ultimate Resource	
Fred Singer	M	1924–2020	Air pollution	The Greenhouse Debate Continued	
Alexander Skutch	M	1904–2004	Natural history	Helpers at Birds’ Nests: A Worldwide Survey of Cooperative Breeding and Related Behavior	
Ted Smith	M	1945–	Electronic waste	Challenging the Chip (co-authored)	
Gary Snyder	M	1930–	Deep ecology		
David A Sonnenfeld	M		Environmental social science	Challenging the Chip (co-authored)	
James Gustave Speth	M	1942–	Various themes	Red Sky at Morning: America and the Crisis of the Global Environment	
Sandra Steingraber	F	1959–	Pollution	Living Downstream: An Ecologist Looks at Cancer and the Environment	
Thomas H. Stoner, Jr.	M	1960–	Sustainable development	Small Change Big Gains: Reflections of an Energy Entrepreneur	
John Tallmadge	M		Nature	Reading Under the Sign of Nature: New Essays in Ecocriticism (co-edited)	
Sarah McFarland Taylor	F		Various themes	Green Sisters: A Spiritual Ecology	
Henry David Thoreau	M	1817–1862	Various themes		Category:Books by Henry David Thoreau
Karen J. Warren	F	1947–2020	Various themes		
Arthur Waskow	M	1933–	Various themes	Torah of the Earth: Exploring 4,000 Years of Ecology in Jewish Thought	
Harvey Wasserman	M	1945–	Anti-nuclear movement in the United States	Killing Our Own: The Disaster of America’s Experience with Atomic Radiation (co-authored)	
Spencer R. Weart	M	1942–	Global warming	The Discovery of Global Warming	
Linda Weintraub	F		Various themes	Eco Art in Pursuit of a Sustainable Planet	
Alan Weisman	M	1947–	Human extinction	The World Without Us	
Adam Werbach	M	1973–			
Tom Wessels	M		Conservation biology	The Myth of Progress: Toward a Sustainable Future	
Rex Weyler	M	1947–	Various themes	Greenpeace: The Inside Story	
Clint Wilder	M		Clean technology	The Clean Tech Revolution (co-authored)	
E. O. Wilson	M	1929–2021	Biodiversity	The Creation: An Appeal to Save Life on Earth	
Bruce Yandle	M		Free-market environmentalism	Taking the Environment Seriously	
Daniel Yergin	M	1947–	Energy	The Prize: The Epic Quest for Oil, Money, and Power	
Ozzie Zehner	M		Renewable energy and consumption	Green Illusions: The Dirty Secrets of Clean Energy and the Future of Environmentalism	

== See also ==
- List of environmental books
- List of non-fiction environmental writers
