= May 1960 =

Month of 1960

<<	May 1960					>>
Su	Mo	Tu	We	Th	Fr	Sa
1	2	3	4	5	6	7
8	9	10	11	12	13	14
15	16	17	18	19	20	21
22	23	24	25	26	27	28
29	30	31

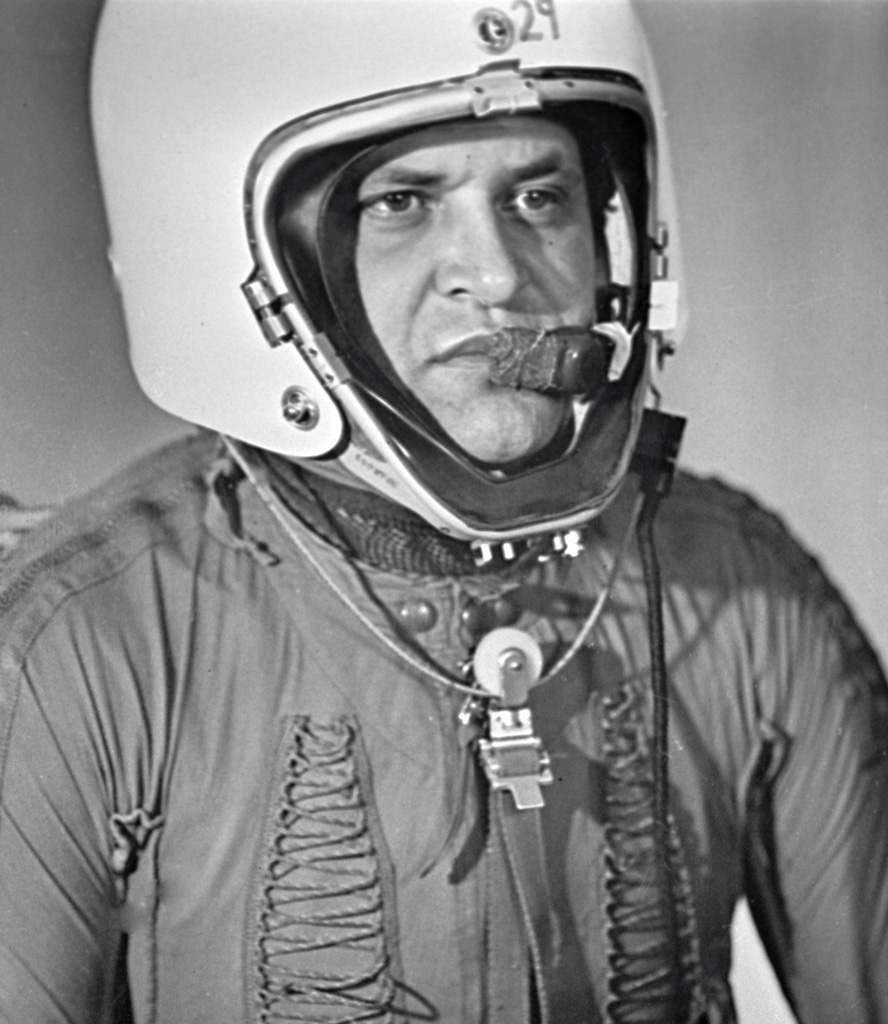
May 1, 1960: USSR shoots down American U-2 spy plane and captures USAF spy pilot Francis Gary Powers alive

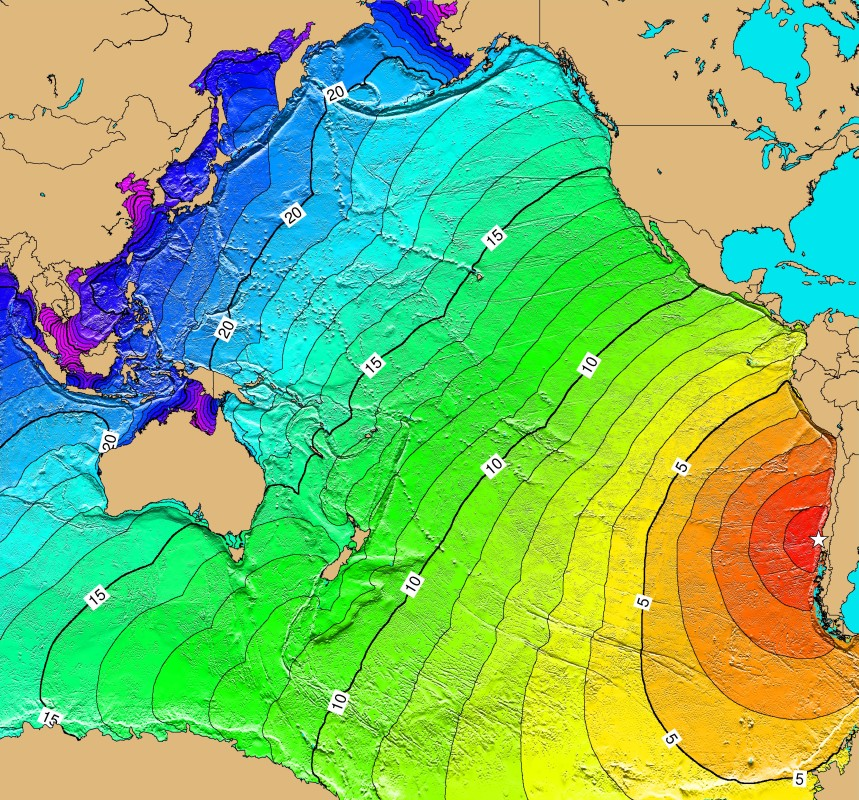
May 22, 1960: Earthquake strikes Chile, triggers tsunamis and aftershocks that kill over 5,000 people in Chile, U.S., and Japan

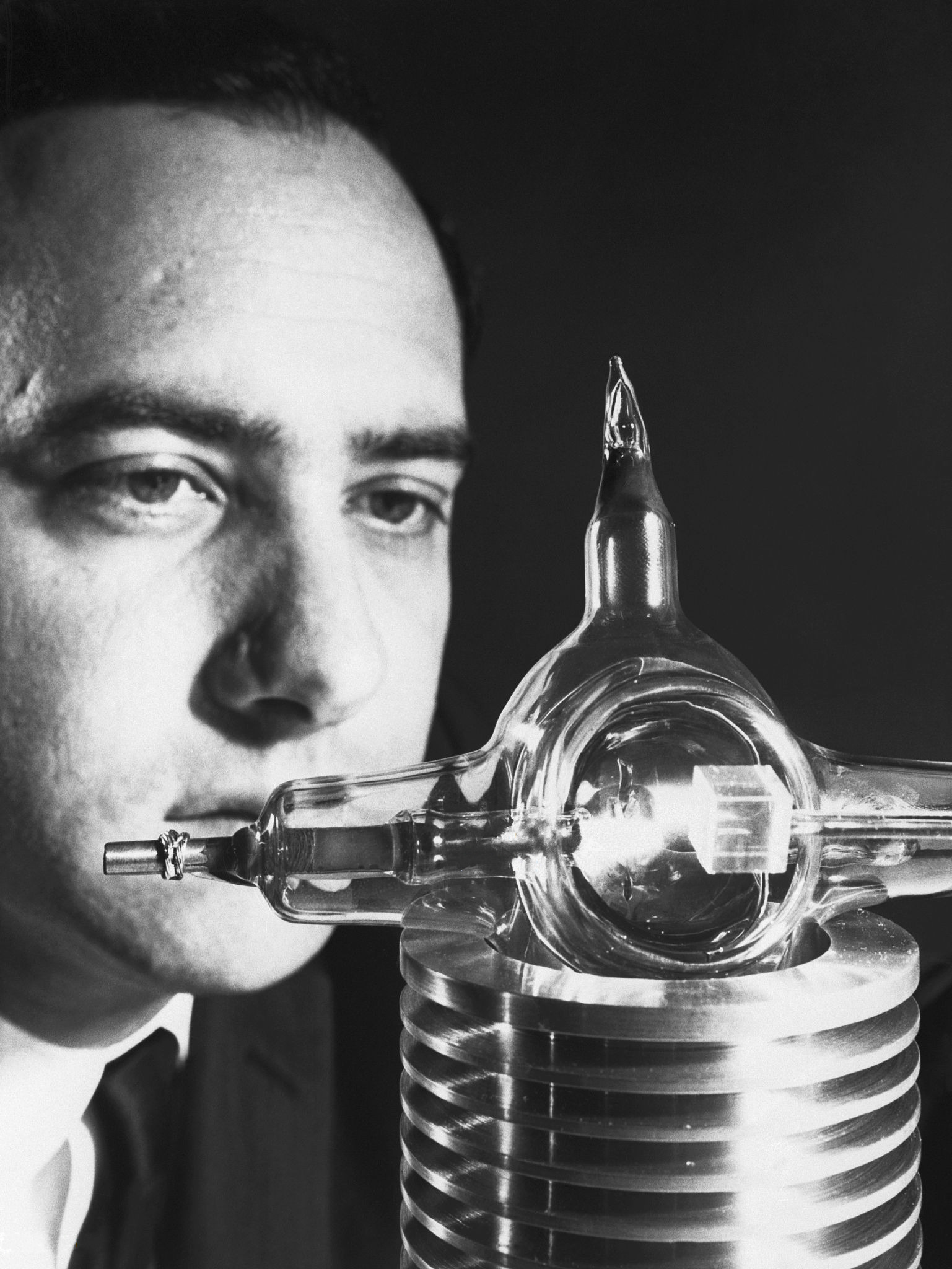
May 16, 1960: Physicist Theodore Maiman makes successful test of the first laser

The following events occurred in May 1960:

== May 1, 1960 (Sunday) ==
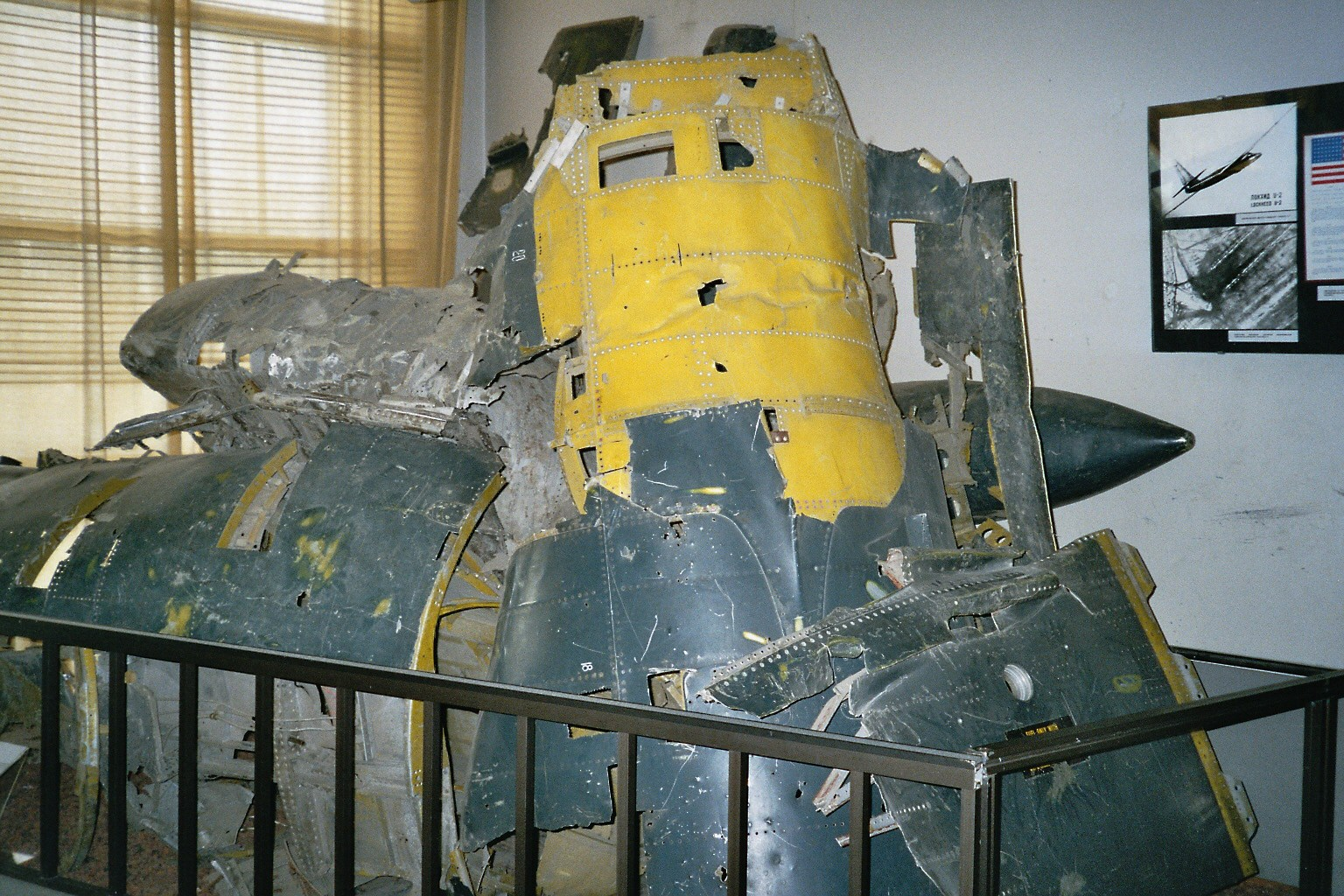
Wreckage of the U-2, on display in a Moscow museum

- The U-2 Incident began when an American U-2 spy plane, piloted by Francis Gary Powers, entered Soviet airspace ten minutes after takeoff from a U.S. base in Pakistan, at Peshawar. At 9:53 a.m. (0653 GMT), his plane was struck by shrapnel from an exploding Soviet SA-2 missile while he was at 70,500 feet (21,488 m). Powers parachuted and chose not to commit suicide, and landed near Sverdlovsk, where he was captured alive.
- Maharashtra and Gujarat were formed as the 14th and 15th States of India, when the Bombay State was split along linguistic lines.
- Born: Steve Cauthen, American jockey, 1978 U.S. Triple Crown winner; Sports Illustrated magazine's Sportsman of the Year at age 17; in Covington, Kentucky

== May 2, 1960 (Monday) ==
- Caryl Chessman was executed at 10:03 a.m. in the gas chamber at California's San Quentin Prison after ten years on Death Row. In San Francisco, defense attorneys had asked to present an argument, and U.S. Judge Louis E. Goodman had decided to issue a stay of execution as Chessman was being strapped into his chair, and instructed his secretary to call the prison, but the secretary had copied only four of the five digits of the telephone number, after which the call took a full minute to go through. Goodman blamed the defense attorneys for waiting until the last minute to seek a stay, commenting that "One of them, at least, should have been here earlier." Chessman, an accomplished author on death row for rape rather murder, had won eight prior stays of execution, and his death was protested worldwide.
- Outfielder Jim Lemon of the Washington Senators became the first Major League Baseball player to wear a batting helmet with earflaps. Helmets had been required in both leagues since 1958 but the helmet, required in Little League Baseball, was made available by Senators' owner Calvin Griffith, who ordered the headgear after Earl Battey was struck in the head by a pitch thrown by Tom Sturdivant of the Boston Red Sox. Despite concerns that the flap obscured the batter's vision, Lemon got two hits in three at-bats in a 3–2 win over the Cleveland Indians.
- As police officer Leonard Baldy was preparing to do a live traffic report on Chicago's WGN (AM) radio station, he and helicopter pilot Horace Ferry were killed when one of the overhead rotor blades fell from the station's helicopter. Ferry was able to maneuver the craft away from the intersection of Milwaukee Avenue and Hubbard Street into a railroad yard embankment, narrowly missing a truck and three children who had been walking along a sidewalk.
- Dr. Robert H. Goetz, a German-born surgeon, led a team at the Van Etten Hospital in the Bronx (now the Jacobi Medical Center) in performing the first coronary artery bypass surgery on a human patient.
- WLS-AM of Chicago became the first large radio station in the Midwest to switch over to a rock 'n roll format.

== May 3, 1960 (Tuesday) ==
Interrupted programming

- At 2:00 p.m. Eastern time (11:00 a.m. Pacific), all regular television and radio broadcasting in the United States halted for 30 minutes as the airwaves were taken over by CONELRAD (later the Emergency Broadcasting System), and sirens sounded across the nation, and all people outside were directed to go to the nearest fallout shelter. It was all part of "Operation Alert 1960" and regular programming was restored after 30 minutes. At New York's City Hall Park, a crowd of 500 demonstrators refused police orders to seek shelter, in protest over the nuclear arms race.
- The Fantasticks, the most popular musical of all time, was staged for the first time. The opening night, at the (off-Broadway) Sullivan Street Playhouse in New York City, was the first of a record 17,162 outings for the show, which would run until January 13, 2002.
- The European Free Trade Association (EFTA), founded by Britain, Sweden, Norway, Denmark, Switzerland, Austria and Portugal, came into being, five months after the Stockholm treaty signed on January 4.

== May 4, 1960 (Wednesday) ==
- The United States signed an agreement to sell 17,000,000 metric tons of surplus grain to India over a four-year period, in exchange for $1,276,000,000.
- Lucille Ball was granted a divorce from Desi Arnaz by a court in Santa Monica, California.
- The 1960 Cannes Film Festival opened.
- Born: Werner Faymann, Chancellor of Austria from 2008 to 2016; in Vienna

== May 5, 1960 (Thursday) ==
- Soviet Premier Nikita S. Khrushchev announced to that nation's parliament that an American military plane had been downed in Soviet territory on May 1.

== May 6, 1960 (Friday) ==
- Ramon Mercader, aka Jacques Monard, the man who had killed Leon Trotsky with an axe on August 20, 1940, was released from the penitentiary in Juarez, Mexico, after which he emigrated to the Soviet Union.
- President Dwight Eisenhower signed the Civil Rights Act of 1960 into law. The bill had passed the House 288–95, after being amended and passed by the Senate 71–18.
- Princess Margaret of the United Kingdom, the sister of Queen Elizabeth II, married Antony Armstrong-Jones in a royal wedding at Westminster Abbey.
- The town of Wilburton, Oklahoma, was destroyed by tornadoes that swept through Oklahoma and Arkansas, killing 27 people and hurting 250.

== May 7, 1960 (Saturday) ==
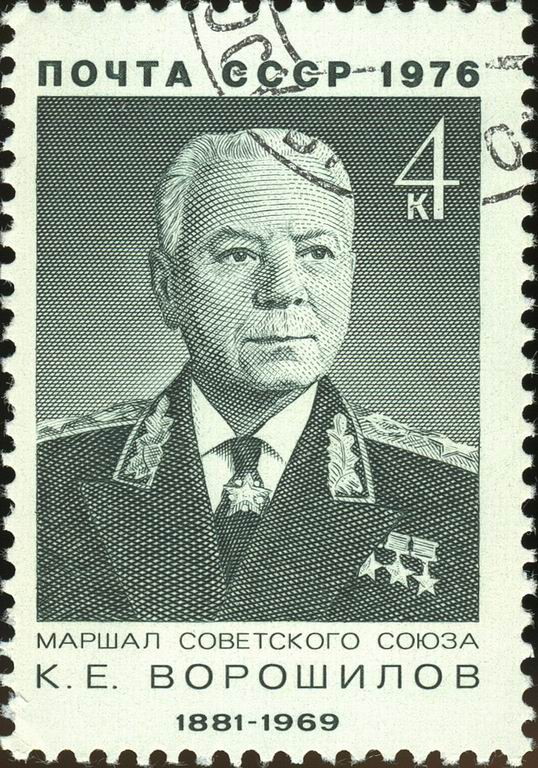
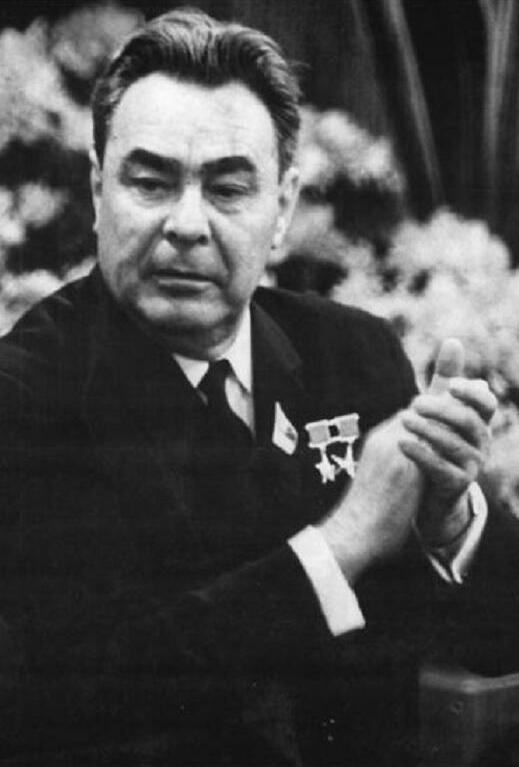
Kliment Voroshilov and Leonid Brezhnev
- Leonid Brezhnev took on the ceremonial post of head of state of the Soviet Union as he succeeded Kliment Voroshilov as Chairman of the Presidium of the Union of Soviet Socialist Republics (generally, but inaccurately referred to in the Western press as the "Soviet President"). Nikita Khrushchev continued as Premier of the Soviet Union (officially the Chairman of the Council of Ministers, equivalent to a prime minister), and as General Secretary of the Communist Party, the de facto leader of the USSR; the latter position that would be taken by Brezhnev in 1964.
- Khrushchev surprised the world by announcing that U-2 pilot Francis Gary Powers, of Pound, Virginia, had been captured "alive and well" near Sverdlovsk, along with film taken of military bases, and Soviet currency. U.S. officials expressed "amazement" at charges that Powers had been on a spy mission.
- In the 1960 FA Cup Final at Wembley Stadium, Wolverhampton Wanderers defeated Blackburn Rovers, 3–0.
- The World Chess Championship was won by Mikhail Tal, who defeated reigning champion Mikhail Botvinnik, 12½ games to 8½, in Moscow. Tal won five games and played 14 to draws, while Botvinnik won only one game.

== May 8, 1960 (Sunday) ==
- Cuba and the Soviet Union formally re-established diplomatic relations, which had been ended in 1952. The United States severed its diplomatic ties with Cuba eight months later, on January 3, 1961.
- A Nationalist Chinese Sabrejet crashed into a village in Taiwan, killing the pilot and 10 people on the ground.
- Born: Franco Baresi, Italian football defender; in Travagliato
- Died: J. H. C. Whitehead, 55, British mathematician and pioneer in homotopy theory; of a heart attack while visiting Princeton University

== May 9, 1960 (Monday) ==
- McDonnell's first production Mercury spacecraft, with its escape rocket serving as the propulsion force, was launched from Wallops Island. Designated the "beach-abort test", the objectives were a performance evaluation of the escape system, the parachute and landing system, and recovery operations in an off-the-pad abort situation, and were successfully tested. The spacecraft was returned to the McDonnell plant on May 14 for an integrity test.
- U.S. Attorney General William P. Rogers invoked the new Civil Rights Act of 1960 to force the turnover of voters' registration records in four Southern "cipher counties", so called because there were no African-American registered voters, despite a large population. The counties affected were Wilcox County, Alabama, Webster County, Georgia, McCormick County, South Carolina and East Carroll Parish, Louisiana.
- The U.S. Food and Drug Administration approved a birth control pill for the first time, as it cleared the prescription of Enovid, manufactured by G. D. Searle & Company, for use as an oral contraceptive.
- Born: Tony Gwynn, MLB star outfielder and Baseball Hall of Fame inductee (d. 2014); in Los Angeles

== May 10, 1960 (Tuesday) ==
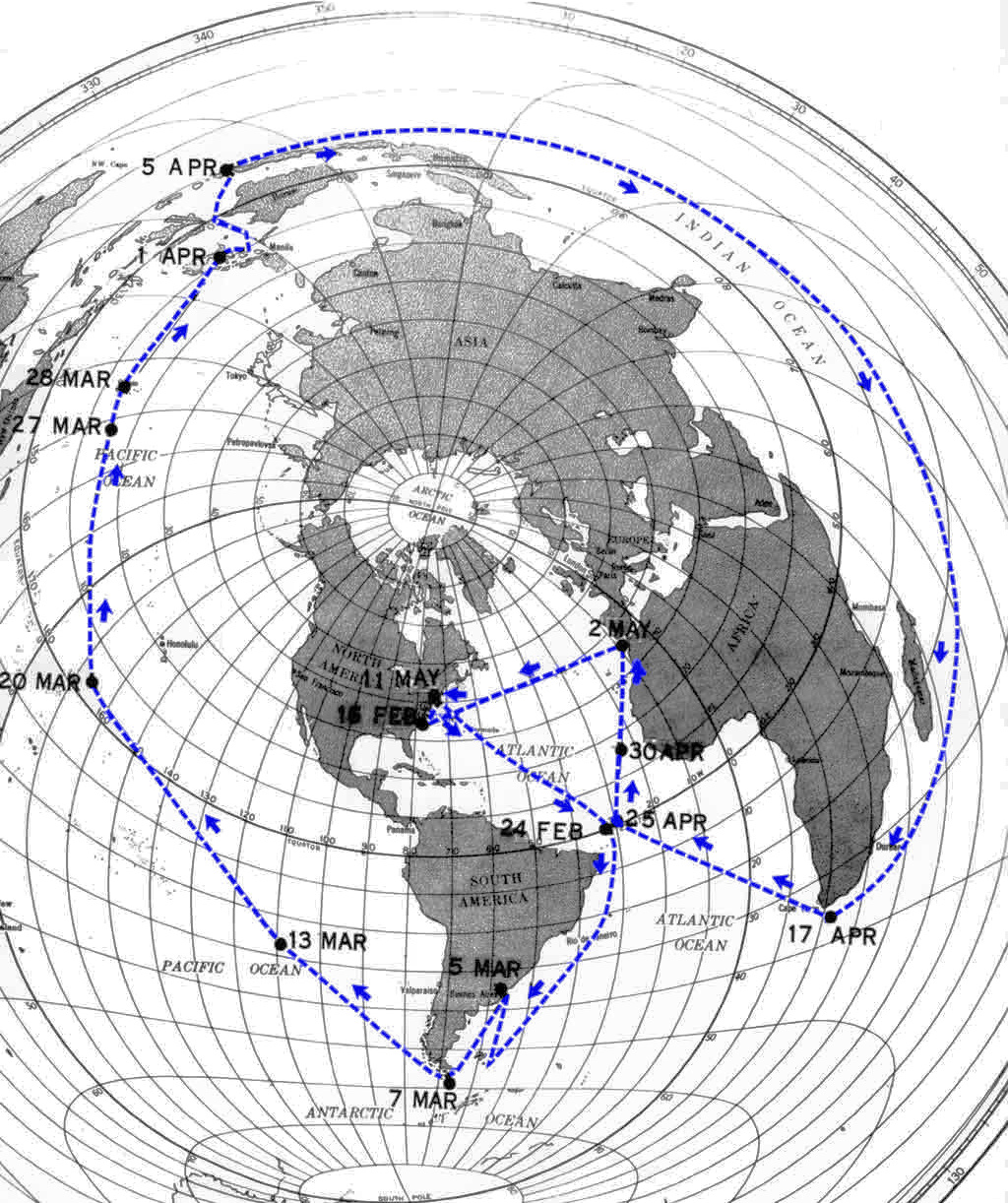
USS Triton's voyage

- The submarine USS Triton completed its circumnavigation of the globe, after an 84-day voyage that followed the route of Ferdinand Magellan's expedition of 1519–1522.
- John F. Kennedy defeated Hubert Humphrey in the West Virginia primary election, winning the predominantly Protestant state and dispelling doubts about whether Americans would support a Roman Catholic nominee. The win was Senator Kennedy's seventh in the primaries. At 1:08 a.m. the next day, Humphrey conceded defeat, and then said "I am no longer a candidate for the Democratic Presidential nomination", leaving Senator Kennedy unopposed.
- Nashville became the first major racially segregated city in the United States to desegregate its lunch counters.
- Born:
  - Bono (stage name for Paul David Hewson), Irish famine relief activist and rock singer for U2 and as a solo performer; in Dublin
  - Merlene Ottey, Jamaican women's 200 m champion; in Hanover, Jamaica
- Died: Yury Olesha, 61, Russian novelist

== May 11, 1960 (Wednesday) ==
- At a press conference four days before a summit meeting in Paris with Soviet Premier Khrushchev, President Eisenhower of the United States accepted full responsibility for the U-2 incident, and said that spying on the Soviet Union was justified. "No one wants another Pearl Harbor", he said, adding "In most of the world, no large-scale attack could be prepared in secret, but in the Soviet Union there is a fetish of secrecy, and concealment."
- In Buenos Aires, four Mossad agents abducted fugitive Nazi Adolf Eichmann aka "Ricardo Klement", shortly after he got off of a bus near his home at 8:10 p.m. Eichmann, mastermind of the Jewish Holocaust in Germany, would be held captive for ten days until he could be flown to Israel.
- The passenger liner SS France was launched at Saint-Nazaire by Madame Yvonne de Gaulle, wife of the French president.
- Born: Jürgen Schult, German former track and field athlete and, as of 2023, the world record holder in the discus throw; in Hagenow, Mecklenburg-Vorpommern, East Germany
- Died: John D. Rockefeller Jr., 86, American philanthropist who gave away $475,000,000 of his inheritance during his lifetime.

== May 12, 1960 (Thursday) ==
- Soviet Premier Khrushchev said in a statement that if the United States made further overflights of the USSR, "this might lead to war" and then added that further aggression would be met "with atom bombs in the first few minutes".
- The Space Task Group established a field representative office at the McDonnell plant in St. Louis, Missouri.
- By order of U.S. Defense Secretary Thomas S. Gates, the Defense Communications Agency was established.
- The capsizing of a boat on the Krishna River in India's Andhara Pradesh state drowned at least 60 people.

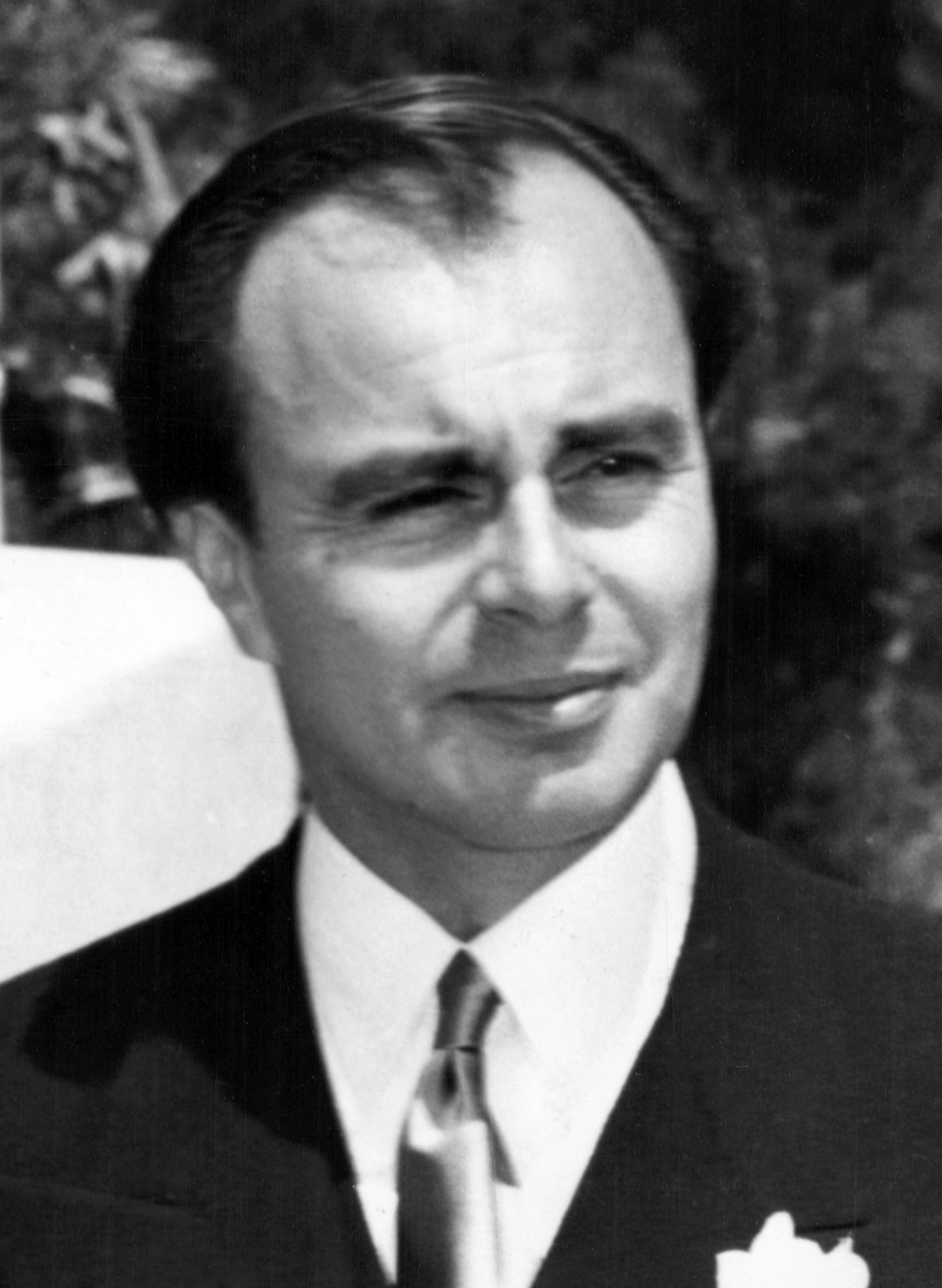
Aly Khan

- Died: Prince Aly Khan, 48, Pakistan's "playboy turned diplomat", died of massive head injuries after his Lancia sports car collided with a sedan in the Parisian suburb of Suresnes, France. The other driver, Herve Bichaton, was reportedly on the wrong side of the road.

== May 13, 1960 (Friday) ==
- A group of 200 students, mostly white, staged a sit-in inside the San Francisco City Hall to protest against the House Un-American Activities Committee, following the example of passive resistance used by African-American protesters to fight segregation. The city police dispersed the crowd with fire hoses and clubs, but the students' defiance was dramatic. Between 1,500 and 2,000 people picketed the last session of the committee's hearings, and another 3,500 predominantly anti-Committee spectators massed outside the building. As one author notes, "No one had previously dared confront HUAC so brazenly; most Americans were terrified of even coming into contact with the committee."
- The first launch by the United States of its new 91 ft (28 m) Delta rocket failed as the third stage did not ignite. The failure would be followed by 15 consecutive successful launches.
- A six-member team of Swiss, Austrian and Bhutanese climbers, were the first to reach the top of Dhaulagiri, at 8,167 m (26,794 ft), the world's seventh highest mountain.

== May 14, 1960 (Saturday) ==
- U.S. President Eisenhower flew to Paris for the scheduled Four Power Summit, after President de Gaulle of France verified that Soviet Premier Khrushchev still wanted to convene the meeting. The talks broke off shortly after de Gaulle called them to order two days later.

== May 15, 1960 (Sunday) ==
- While in Paris with President Eisenhower on the first day of a summit with Soviet Premier Khrushchev, U.S. Secretary of Defense Thomas S. Gates Jr. ordered a test of the American military alert system. Declassified documents would later show that Gates's order at 0033 UTC for "a high state of command readiness" was misunderstood, and that within half an hour, the U.S. Joint Chiefs of Staff placed troops worldwide at DEFCON 3 status. The American public learned of the alert when Lowry Air Force Base asked police to locate key personnel, and the police asked Denver radio station KOA (AM) and KOA-TV to assist. The message that followed- "All fighter pilots F-101 and fighter pilots F-102... Doe Three Alert, Hotcake One and Hotcake Six, scramble at Lowry immediately!" was heard by thousands of Denver listeners.
- The Soviet Union launched Sputnik IV, a five-ton mockup of a crewed spaceship, as a prelude to putting human beings into outer space. The satellite carried a heavy life-size dummy, luckily; the retrorockets fired in the wrong direction, sending the ship into a higher orbit rather than returning it to Earth. The satellite would re-enter Earth's atmosphere on September 5, 1962, with a 20-pound (9.1 kg) fragment landing at the intersection of North 8th Street and Park Street in Manitowoc, Wisconsin.
- Qualification tests for the Mercury spacecraft explosive egress hatch were completed.
- The new Convair 880 made its first passenger flight, for Delta Air Lines.

== May 16, 1960 (Monday) ==
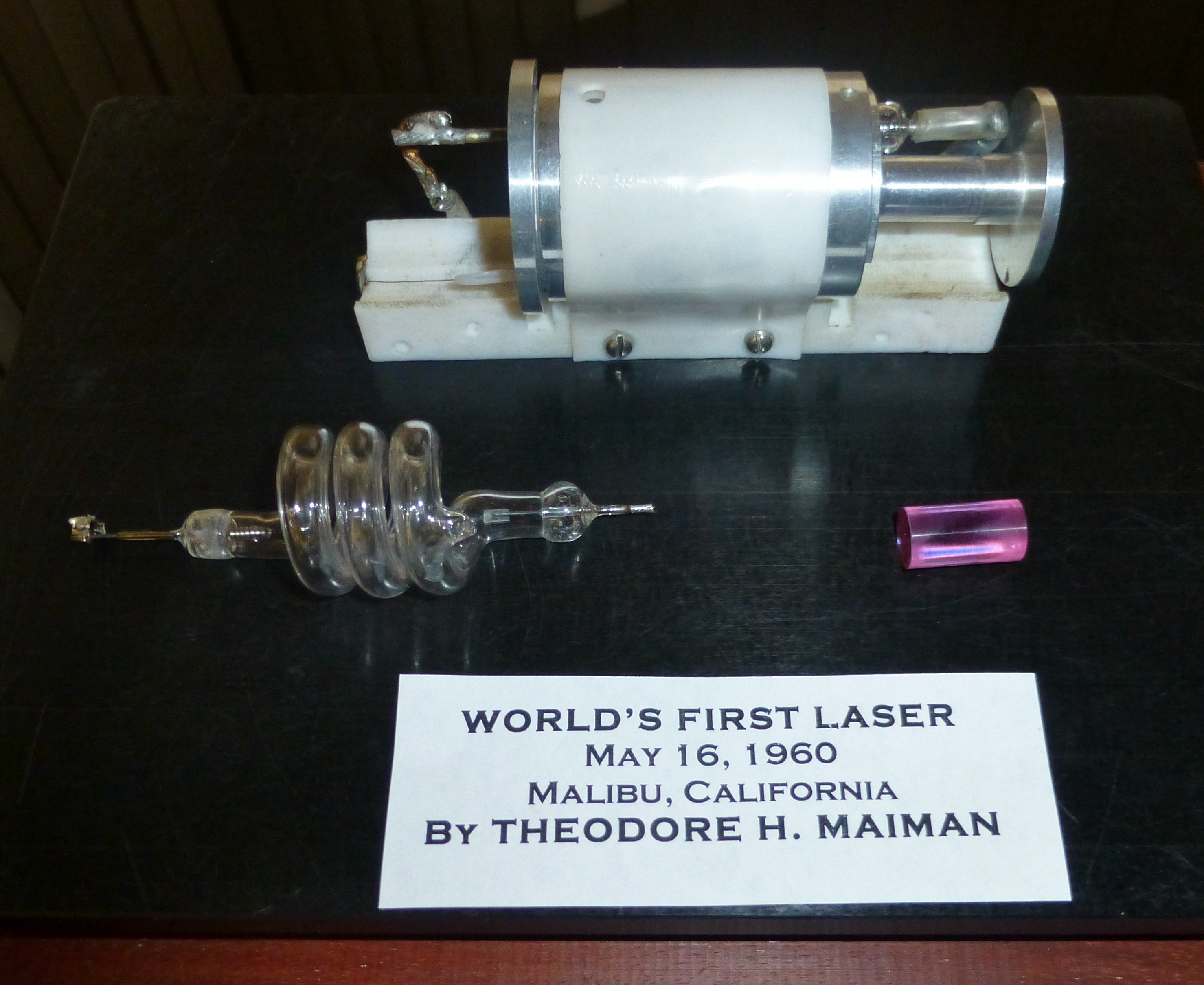
"World's First Laser: May 16, 1960, Malibu, California, by Theodore H. Maiman"

- The first working laser was created by U.S. physicist Theodore Maiman, who focused a high-powered flash lamp on a silver-coated ruby rod at the Hughes Research Laboratory in Malibu, California.
- Shortly after the Four Power Summit in Paris was opened by France's President DeGaulle at 11:00 a.m., Soviet Premier Nikita Khrushchev demanded the right to speak, and then delivered an angry tirade, which ended with a cancellation of the invitation for President Eisenhower to visit the USSR beginning June 10. The summit ended at 2:00 p.m., and Khrushchev did not show up for further meetings. Eisenhower, Khrushchev and Britain's Prime Minister Macmillan left France three days later.
- Representatives of NASA's research centers began a two-day conference at Langley Research Center to present findings and discuss future work on space rendezvous, the linking of separately-launched spacecraft in orbit, including the concept of a space ferry to rendezvous with a space station in cislunar space.

== May 17, 1960 (Tuesday) ==
- "Radio Swan", secretly funded and operated by the American CIA, began broadcasting anti-Communist propaganda to Cuba, from a transmitter on Swan Island off of the coast of Honduras.
- Died: Joseph Taborsky, 36, who had robbed and murdered six people over a six-year period, was executed in Connecticut in the electric chair.

== May 18, 1960 (Wednesday) ==
- The 132nd and last original broadcast of the landmark American TV series Playhouse 90, was shown on CBS, with the telecast of "In the Presence of Mine Enemies".
- Born:
  - Yannick Noah, French tennis player who would win the French Open at age 23; in Sedan
  - Jari Kurri, Finnish ice hockey player and Hockey Hall of Fame inductee; in Helsinki
  - Tyka Nelson, American singer; in Minneapolis, Minnesota (d. 2024)

== May 19, 1960 (Thursday) ==
- In Japan, conservative Prime Minister Nobusuke Kishi called for a surprise snap vote on a revised version of the U.S.-Japan Security Treaty in the National Diet, violating parliamentary norms by cutting off debate earlier than expected and leading to a protest sit-in by opposition Japan Socialist Party Diet members. In the so-called "May 19th Incident," Kishi introduced 500 police officers to the Diet building and had the Socialist Party members physically removed from the legislature, before ramming the treaty through just after midnight the next day with only members of his own party present. These actions, widely perceived to be anti-democratic, will lead to a dramatic upsurge in the ongoing Anpo protests against the treaty in the rest of May and June.
- The largest anti-nuclear rally held in the United States, up to that time, took place at Madison Square Garden in New York, as 17,000 people attended to hear speeches by Eleanor Roosevelt, Norman Thomas, Alf Landon, Walter Reuther and others demanding worldwide disarmament.
- The first polling organization in the Soviet Union, the "Public Opinion Institute", was announced by the Party newspaper Komsomolskaya Pravda. From 1960 to 1967, Komsomol took surveys on such topics as "How has your standard of living changed?"

== May 20, 1960 (Friday) ==
- In Japan, the lower house of the Diet of Japan voted at 12:17 a.m. to ratify the new security treaty with the United States, but only after police removed Japan Socialist Party members who had blockaded Speaker Ichiro Kiyose in his office.
- Born: John Billingsley, American TV actor known for Star Trek: Enterprise; in Media, Pennsylvania.

== May 21, 1960 (Saturday) ==
- PFC Buzo Minagawa of Japan, was captured in a jungle at Guam, where he had been sent in 1944 as part of the 3219th artillery during World War II. Through interpreters, Minagawa said that he still could not believe that Japan had lost the war. His companion, Masashi Ito, was found two days later on May 23, and both men were welcomed home on May 28.
- An El Al flight took off from Buenos Aires at 12:05 a.m., with kidnapped Nazi fugitive Adolf Eichmann safely on board, to face trial for the Holocaust in Israel.
- Born: Jeffrey Dahmer, American serial killer and sex offender who killed and dismembered seventeen males between 1978 and 1991; in Milwaukee (killed by inmate, 1994)

== May 22, 1960 (Sunday) ==
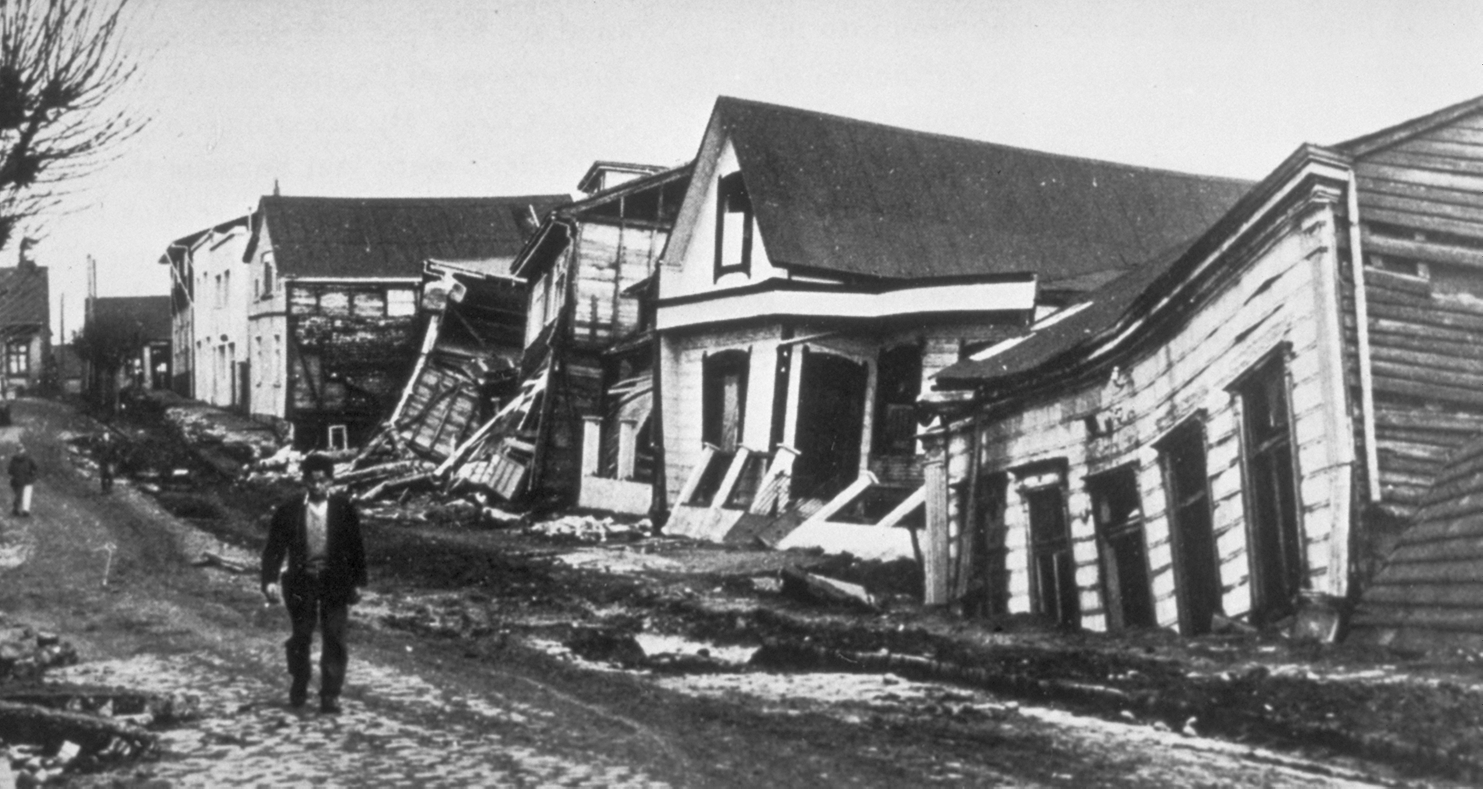
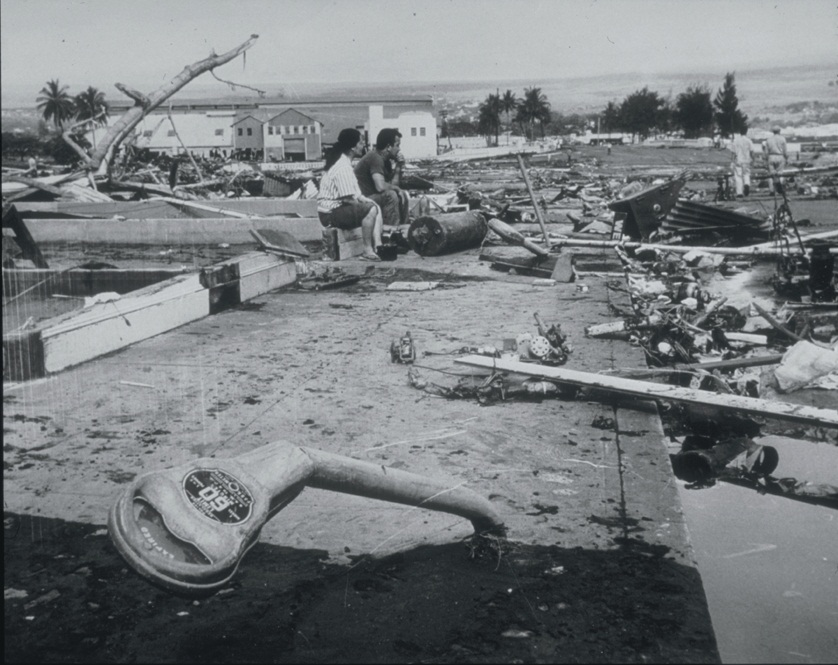
Damage in Valdivia, Chile, and in Hilo, Hawaii, U.S.
- Nearly 5,000 people were killed by a 9.5 magnitude earthquake in Chile that struck at 3:11 p.m. local time (1511 UTC) near Valdivia. Based on seismographic data, the tremor was measured as the largest earthquake of the 20th century, with 9.5 being almost twice as big (and almost three times as strong) as the 9.2 quake that would strike Alaska in 1964. The initial tremor killed 1,655 people, and the aftershocks killed another 4,000. Two million were left homeless, and the shock sent tsunamis that killed 61 people in the U.S. state of Hawaii and another 119 in Japan.
- The Belgian Congo held elections for the 137-member Chamber of Deputies in advance of being granted independence. Candidates from 28 different political parties were elected as deputies, and Patrice Lumumba's Mouvement National Congolais party won more (33 or less than one-fourth of the seats) than the party with the next highest number. Lumumba was then asked by Belgian authorities to form the first government as Prime Minister.
- Adolf Eichmann arrived in Israel at 7:35 a.m., roughly 24 hours after he had been spirited out of Argentina.
- Born: Hideaki Anno, Japanese film director; in Ube, Yamaguchi

== May 23, 1960 (Monday) ==
- A tsunami killed 61 people in the U.S. state of Hawaii, and injured 282, after rolling into the bay of Hilo at 1:05 a.m., local time (1105 UTC). The tsunami followed almost 20 hours after the Great Chilean Earthquake.

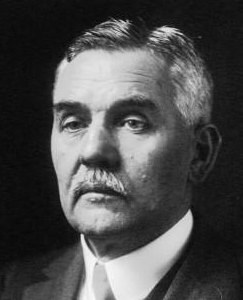
Claude

- A merger of the Unitarian and Universalist churches was endorsed at meetings held in Boston by delegates from the American Unitarian Association (725 to 143) and the Universalist Church of America (365 to 65), to create the Unitarian Universalist Association.
- Prime Minister David Ben-Gurion of Israel surprised the Knesset at 4:00 p.m., with the announcement that, "Israeli Security Services captured one of the greatest Nazi criminals, Adolf Eichmann... Eichmann is already in detention in Israel, and will soon be put on trial here."
- Spacecraft No. 4 (production number), after being instrumented and prepared by the Space Task Group and the Langley Research Center for flight tests, was delivered to Cape Canaveral for the Mercury-Atlas 1 mission.
- Died: Georges Claude, 89, French engineer described as "The Edison of France" for his inventions, including neon lighting and the process for the liquefaction of gases (including liquid oxygen and liquid nitrogen).

== May 24, 1960 (Tuesday) ==
- The Cincinnati Radiation Experiments began at the Cincinnati General Hospital. Dr. Eugene Saenger, a radiologist, had applied for a grant from the U.S. Department of Defense for a study titled "Metabolic Changes in Humans Following Total Body Irradiation", with the goal of determining how soldiers in nuclear war would be affected by large doses of radiation, and irradiated cancer patients without their consent during the first five years of the project. A consent form would be introduced in 1965, without mentioning possible side effects from the radiation exposure. Ninety patients were given high doses of radiation before the project was discontinued in 1971.
- Tsunamis from the Chilean earthquake, 8,000 miles (13,000 km) away, struck the coast of Japan at Hokkaido, Sanriku and Kii, killing 119 people and washing away 2,800 homes.
- Thirty-eight hours after the 1960 Valdivia earthquake in Chile, the Chilean volcano Cordón Caulle began a rhyodacitic fissure eruption.
- The United States launched the Midas II satellite, the first designed to detect missile launches. "Midas" was an acronym for Missile Defense Alarm System.
- Born: Kristin Scott Thomas, English actress; in Redruth, Cornwall

== May 25, 1960 (Wednesday) ==
- At 0420 Beijing time, the Chinese Mountaineering Team successfully reached the summit Mount Everest from the north side.
- An additional 5,000 people were killed in Chile as four new earthquakes struck during the day.
- Voting for a 137-member Chamber of Deputies, carried out over a 15-day period, concluded in the Belgian Congo, as the nation prepared for independence. Patrice Lumumba's National Congolese Movement won a plurality of seats, with 36.

== May 26, 1960 (Thursday) ==
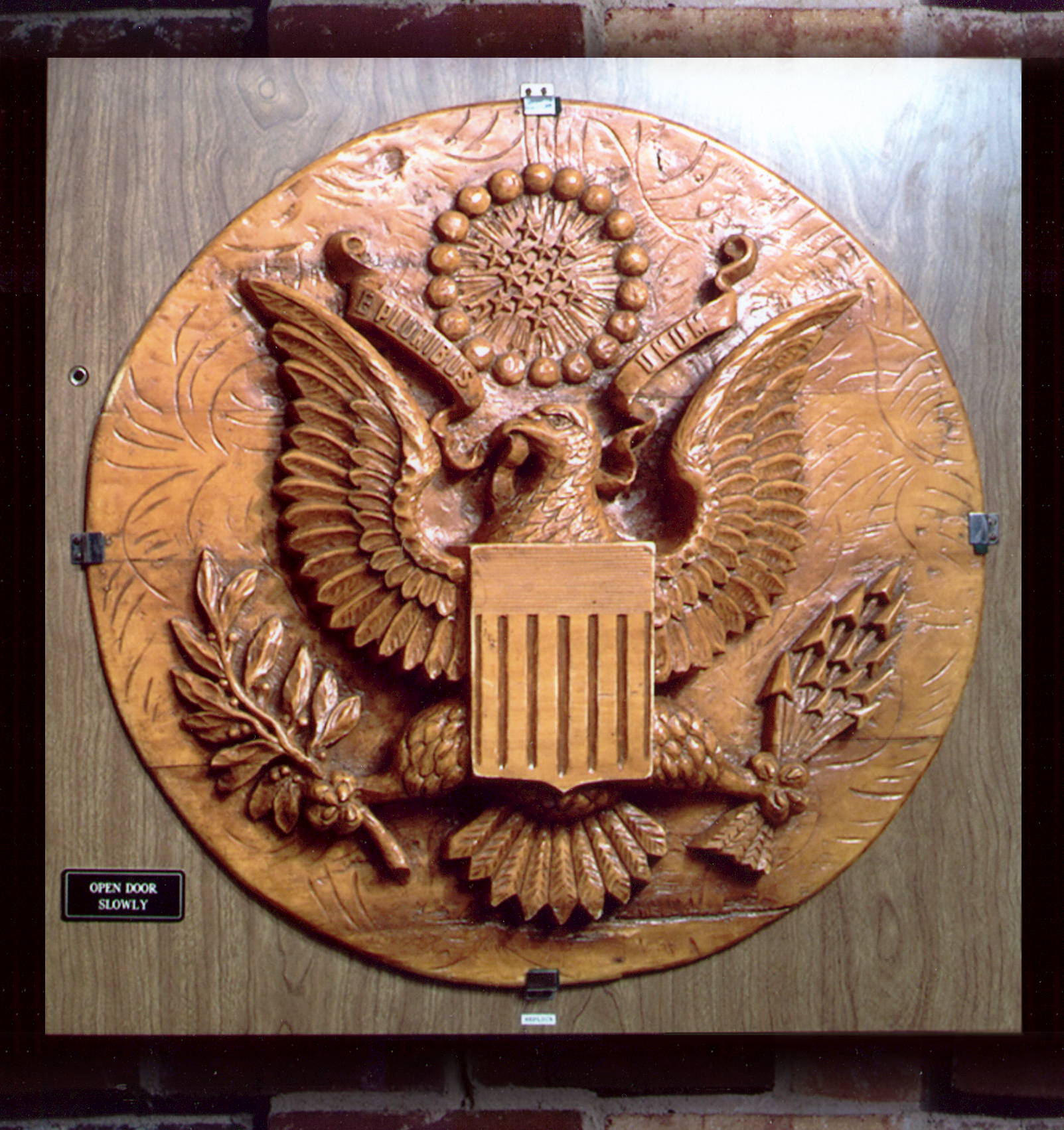
The gift from the USSR to the U.S. Ambassador; listening device was in the eagle's beak

- At the United Nations in New York, U.S. Ambassador Henry Cabot Lodge Jr. displayed a hand-carved replica of the Great Seal of the United States that had been presented by the Soviets as a gift to the American ambassador in Moscow, and the listening device that had been discovered inside "right under the beak of the eagle".

== May 27, 1960 (Friday) ==
- In Turkey, the army staged a coup d'état, led by General Cemal Gürsel, and arrested President Celal Bayar and Prime Minister Adnan Menderes. General Gürsel assumed both offices and replaced the legislature with 37 officers who formed the Milli Birlik Komitesi (Committee of National Unity). Menderes, Foreign Minister Fatin Rustu Zorlu and Finance Minister Hasan Polatkan were later hanged, while Bayar was released after three years imprisonment.
- King Mohammed V of Morocco dismissed Prime Minister Abdallah Ibrahim and Ibrahim's ministers, then took on the additional job of Prime Minister of Morocco.
- Dayton J. Lalonde completed a solo voyage from Los Angeles to Sydney after having been at sea on his sailboat, the Craig.
- Ireland's Grand Canal, connecting Dublin to Limerick, was closed after 156 years.

== May 28, 1960 (Saturday) ==
- The musical Greenwillow closed at the Alvin Theater in New York City after only 95 performances.
- The American Society for Cell Biology was organized.
- Died: Ramón Gay, 42, Mexican film actor

== May 29, 1960 (Sunday) ==
- Syngman Rhee, formerly the President of South Korea, departed that nation for exile in Honolulu, where he would die five years later.
- The Monaco Grand Prix was won by Stirling Moss.
- The interrogation of Adolf Eichmann began.

== May 30, 1960 (Monday) ==
- Jim Rathmann won the 1960 Indianapolis 500. Prior to the race, temporary seating collapsed, killing two people and injuring 70.

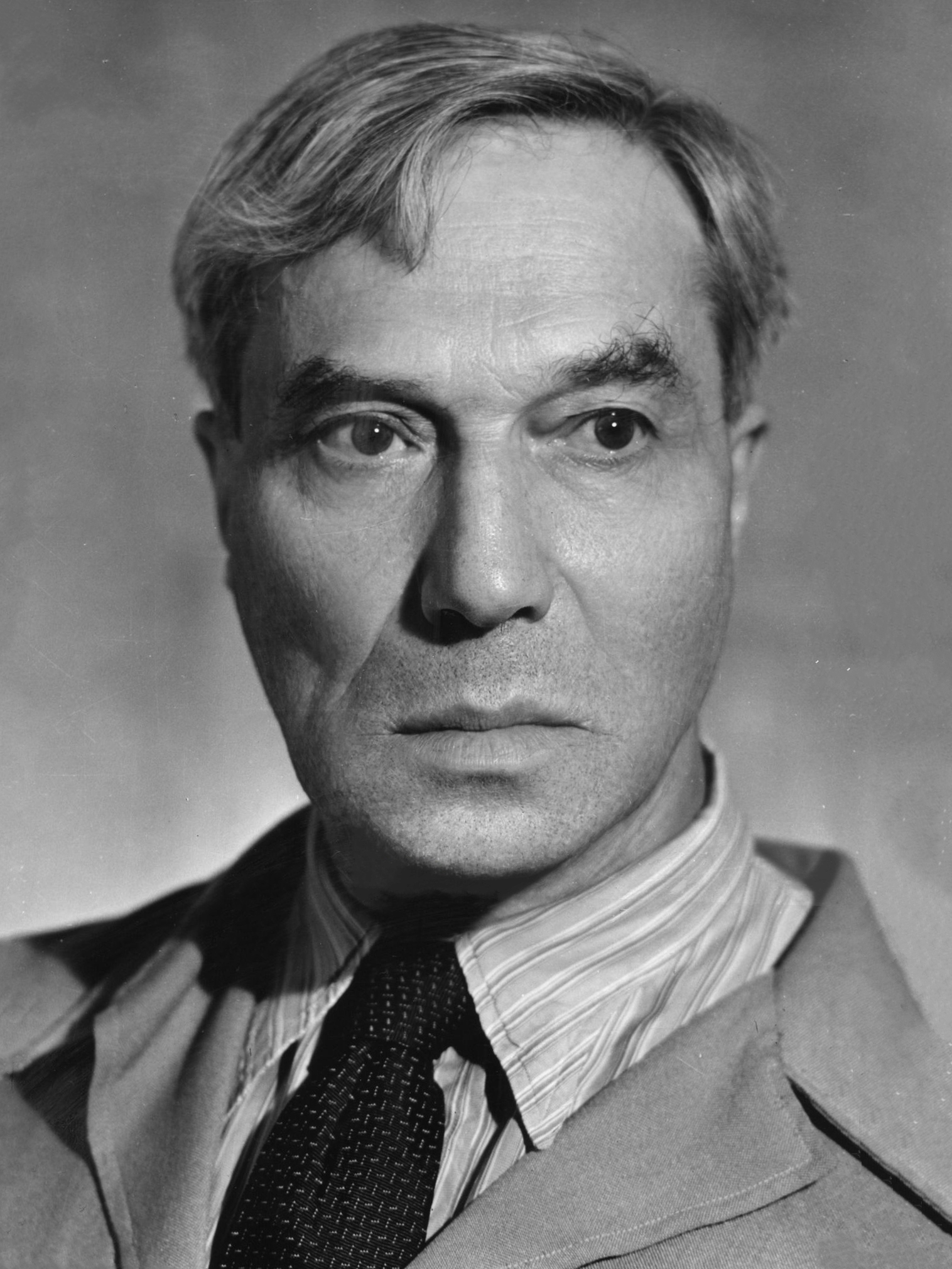
Pasternak

- Died: Boris Pasternak, 70, Russian author known for his novel Doctor Zhivago

== May 31, 1960 (Tuesday) ==
- Jane Goodall began her study of chimpanzees in the wild, arriving at Lolui Island in Kenya after her original plans, to go to the Gombe Reserve, were thwarted by a political dispute.
- The President's Joint Commission on Mental Illness and Health in the U.S. reported that 25% of Americans had suffered from mental illness at some point in their lives.
- The Malayan Banking Berhad was incorporated.
- Born: Hervé Gaymard, French MP and former Minister of Agriculture and Finance Minister; in Bourg-Saint-Maurice, Savoie département
- Died: Walther Funk, 70, Reich Minister of Economics for Nazi Germany and President of the Reichsbank during World War II
