= David Egilman =

American physician (1952–2024)

David Egilman (September 9, 1952 – April 2, 2024) was an American physician who was the Editor in Chief of the International Journal of Occupational and Environmental Health and Editor of The Journal of Scientific Practice and Integrity. He was a Clinical Professor at Brown University.

== Early life and education ==
Egilman studied at Brown University, graduating with a Bachelors degree in molecular biology in 1974 and a medical degree in 1978. He earned a master’s degree in public health from Harvard in 1982.

== Career ==
He was known for holding corporations accountable for asbestos-related diseases in their employees, acting as an expert witness in many legal cases. Other advocacy work include cases related to Vioxx, Zyprexa, oxycontin and Johnson’s talcum powder and other products containing talc. In his work as an expert witness, he testified in as many as 15 cases a year. To manage his legal clients, he set up a company named Never Again Consulting, in reference to the Holocaust (of which his father was a survivor) and "his research on corporate 'screwups' so they never happen again."

== Personal life ==
Egilman died on April 2, 2024, at the age of 71.
