= Spencer R. Weart =

American historian

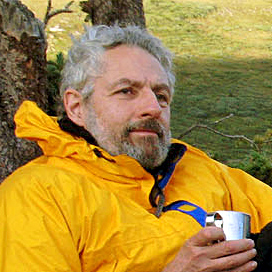
Spencer R. Weart

Spencer R. Weart (born 1942) is the former director of the Center for History of Physics of the American Institute of Physics (AIP) from 1971 until his retirement in 2009. Originally trained as a physicist, he is now a historian of science.

== Early life and education ==
Weart earned his B.A. in Physics at Cornell University in 1963 and a Ph.D. in Physics and Astrophysics at the University of Colorado, Boulder, in 1968. He then did postdoctoral studies at the Hale Observatories and the California Institute of Technology, publishing papers on solar physics.

From 1971 to 1974, Weart studied the history of science at the University of California, Berkeley.

== Career ==
While serving as the director of the AIP Center for History of Physics, located at AIP headquarters in College Park, Maryland, Weart taught courses at Johns Hopkins University and Princeton University.

=== Oral history interviews ===
Weart conducted oral history interviews of many physical scientists, particularly astrophysicists, such as Subrahmanyan Chandrasekhar (1977), and climate scientists, such as Wallace Broecker (1997).

== Works ==
Weart has produced numerous historical articles and two children's science books and written or co-edited eleven other books, including the following:

- Scientists in Power (1979). A history of the rise of nuclear science, weapons, and reactors in France. ISBN 0-674-79515-6
- as editor with Gertrud Weiss Szilard: Leo Szilard: His Version of the Facts (1978). Edited correspondence. ISBN 0-262-69070-5
- Nuclear Fear: A History of Images (1989) ISBN 0-674-62836-5
- as editor with Lillian Hoddeson, Ernest Braun & Jürgen Teichmann: Out of the Crystal Maze: Chapters from the History of Solid State Physics (1992). ISBN 0-19-505329-X
- Never at War: Why Democracies Will Not Fight One Another (1998). ISBN 0-300-08298-3
- The Discovery of Global Warming (2003, 2008). Online extended version. ISBN 0-674-03189-X
- The Rise of Nuclear Fear (2012). ISBN 978-0-674-05233-8

While at AIP he also produced and edited an award-winning website with historical exhibits.
