= Climate of Hope =

Environmental science book by Carl Pope and Michael Bloomberg

- First edition
- Author: Michael Bloomberg; Carl Pope
- Genre: non-fiction environmental science
- Published: April 18, 2017
- Publisher: St. Martin's Press
- ISBN: 978-1-250-14207-8

Climate of Hope: How Cities, Businesses, and Citizens can Save the Planet is an environmental science book by Carl Pope and Michael Bloomberg.

== Context ==
The book is divided into six parts with two chapters each as well as a conclusion. The book switches between Pope and Bloomberg as they draw from their individual experiences within their respective careers as well as historic lessons and scientific evidence as they discuss the inevitable climate crisis of global warming.

They examine the problems at hand from a variety of perspectives and also discuss solutions they have implemented and would like to see implemented and the barriers to such. Finally they look at how society has the potential to solve this crisis utilizing innovative technology, policies and nature.

== Publication ==
Climate of Hope was published on April 18, 2017, by St Martin Publication Press and was a New York Times best selling nonfiction book of that year.
