= Never at War =

1998 book by Spencer R. Weart

- Author: Spencer R. Weart
- Publisher: Yale University Press
- Publication date: 1998
- Pages: 424 pp.
- ISBN: 978-0-300-07017-0
- OCLC: 38249676

Never at War: Why Democracies Will Not Fight One Another is a book by the historian and physicist Spencer R. Weart published by Yale University Press in 1998. It examines political and military conflicts throughout human history and finds no exception to one of the claims that is made by the controversial democratic peace theory that well-established liberal democracies have never made war on one another. In addition to the democratic peace, Weart argues that there is also an oligarchic peace and provides a new explanation for both the democratic and oligarchic peace. The book is often mentioned in the academic debate and has received both praise and criticism.

== Sources ==
The long time period made Weart often rely on the works of other historians, but he consulted at least five works for even trivial crises involving democracies and oligarchies. Some cases have never been studied with that question in mind, and he then used primary sources, which included reading works in French, German (including Alemannic German), Italian (including the Tuscan dialect), Spanish, Greek, and Latin.

== Definitions ==
The book classifies human societies into four broad groups:

Anocracies are societies in which central authority is weak or nonexistent. Kinship bonds extended by personal allegiances to notable leaders are the principal relations. A society may in theory be a state, but if the above applies, Weart classifies it as an anocracy. Examples include tribes, Somalia, and the medieval Italian cities in which influential families fought street battles and lived in fortified keeps. Importantly, there is no central authority that can effectively restrain personal violence such as raids, which often escalate by involving friends and relatives to vendettas and wars. Some anocratic tribes may have a form of democracy in the extended kinship group but no effective control of personal raids against non-kin groups. Examples include the Iroquois, who frequently raided and eventually destroyed most of the Hurons.

Autocracies are states in which opposition against the current rulers is suppressed. There may be frequent shifts back and forth between anocracy and autocracy if a leader temporarily gains enough power to suppress all opponents in a territory.

Oligarchies are states in which participation in government is restricted to an elite. Voting decides policy, and opposition is accepted within the elite. Voting is usually restricted to less than a third of the males. Examples include Sparta and the Polish–Lithuanian Commonwealth.

Democracies are states that are similar to oligarchies, but there is no sharp and clear distinction between an elite and the rest of the domestic population. Usually, more than two thirds of the males have the right to vote.

A borderline case is the Athenian democracy, which excluded metics and slaves. Weart argues that it was a democracy since appearance alone did not decide who was a citizen, citizens became slaves and slaves became free, citizens could be poorer than slaves, and slaves could work such as in banking. The metics were even harder to tell from the citizens. Typically, the citizens and noncitizens worked together under similar conditions. Thus, noncitizens were so interwoven through the community that their views were probably represented by the citizens on most issues. Some aspects of the direct democracy that was practiced in Athens may have been more open and democratic than the representative democracy that is used today. In contrast, the Confederate States was an oligarchy.

To help differentiate between oligarchies and democracies, Weart requires the classification not to differ from how the people at the time viewed the differences, the oligarchic elite should live in constant fear of a rebellion, and a war should not have been prevented if everyone had the vote in democracies. For example, it was the Greeks who first created the concepts of democracy and oligarchy and who classified Athens as a democracy while Sparta was an oligarchy. There was no mention in the historical record of fears of a revolt by the slaves in Athens, but such fears were frequent in Sparta and the Confederate States.

Weart uses a broader definition of war than is usual in his research on the democratic peace theory and includes any conflict causing at least 200 deaths in organized battle by political units against one another. He requires the democracies and the oligarchies to have tolerated dissent for at least three years since he finds that time to be necessary for a political culture in a nation to change and to be reflected in foreign policy.

== Results ==
Using those definitions, Weart finds numerous wars between the same and different kinds of societies but also two exceptions. Democracies have never fought one another, and oligarchies have almost never fought one another. Wars between democracies and oligarchies have, however, been common.

The book argues that the pattern is sharply evident, for example in the 300 years of Ancient Greek history, the Swiss cantons since the 14th century, the County of Flanders during the 14th century, the three-and-a-half centuries of the Hanseatic League, and Renaissance Italy. Those periods included numerous societies that frequently changed types of regime. Those societies abruptly stopped fighting other oligarchies if they became oligarchies and abruptly stopped fighting other democracies if they became a democracies. That pattern immediately reversed if the regime type changed again.

Weart argues that the only clear case of war between oligarchies is a 1656 battle between Bern and Lucerne, which was caused by religious fervor during the Reformation. The War of the Pacific may be another, but both Chile and Peru had strong anocratic tendencies in which family and personal loyalty formed much of the power base of the leaders. Toleration of political dissent was, at best, limited.

Democracies have, a few times, issued formal declarations of war on other democracies, usually because of a war between a temporary allied nondemocracy and the other democracy. In such cases, the democracies have carefully avoided engaging in almost any real battle with one another. There seems to have been almost no deaths during the 369–362 BC war between Thebes and Athens, but at the same time, Sparta and Thebes fought numerous bloody battles. In the main battle in 362 BC, the Athenian infantry avoided joining the charge. Finland and the United Kingdom carefully avoided attacking one another during World War II despite a formal declaration of war.

== Explanation ==
Weart's explanation for the democratic and the oligarchic peace is the human tendency to classify other humans into an ingroup and an outgroup, as has been documented in many psychological studies. Members of the outgroup are seen as inherently inferior and so exploitation of them is justified. Citizens of democracies include citizens of other democratic states in the ingroup. The elites of oligarchies include the elites of other oligarchies in the ingroup. However, the oligarchic elites and the democratic citizens view each other as an outgroup. Democracies view the elites as exploiting the rest of the population, and the oligarchic elites view democracies as governed by inferior men and are afraid that the democratic ideals may spread to their state.

The democratic and oligarchic peace are also strengthened by the culture of arbitration and the respect for the ingroup opposition in both democracies and oligarchies. Similar policies are applied to foreign policy to deal with states belonging to the ingroup. In contrast, the leaders of autocracies are the survivors of a culture of violence against opponents. They use similar methods to deal with other states, which often cause wars. The book presents earlier statistical studies and case studies to show that democracies and oligarchies conduct diplomacy very differently from autocracies. Weart argues against explanations like more trade between democracies since he finds the pattern to change too abruptly for that to be the case.

Earlier democracies and oligarchies did not include non-Europeans in the ingroup since they perceived them to be racially inferior and to be living in autocracies and anocracies. That allowed colonial and imperialistic wars and exploitation.

The book also describes an "appeasement trap." The autocratic leaders misunderstand the conciliatory methods used by democracies and oligarchies and see it as an admission of weakness that can be exploited with little risk. When the conciliatory methods are suddenly abandoned and the war arrives, autocratic leaders are often surprised and then conclude that the other side planned the war from the beginning.

== Specific conflicts ==
Most of the book describes specific conflicts that are borderline cases in which critical features might be expected to show up. The following presents some of the conflicts mentioned and Weart's arguments for why they are not wars between well-established liberal democracies.

- American Revolutionary War: the United States can be considered a liberal democracy after the Continental Congress but was less than three years old. The monarchy under George III was still the final arbiter of British policy in such matters as the appointment of colonial officials and the power to declare wars. The franchise was restricted to a small minority.
- Quasi-War, with less than 200 battle deaths, a few dozen. The franchise in the French Directory was restricted to a minority of wealthy Frenchmen. In 1797, a coup d'état used troops against the opposition, closed down opposing newspapers, canceled election results, and condemned hundreds of opponents to exile or death.
- War of 1812: the franchise in the United States was restricted to white men. The British prince regent still retained the final word on ministers and war. Open criticism was punishable as lèse majesté, and dissidents were driven into exile. The franchise was restricted to a small minority.
- Trail of Tears: the Cherokees had created a republican constitution in 1827 that theorically had many democratic rights. However, it allowed slaveholding and became increasingly authoritarian and eventually beat, censored and even murdered those advocating a voluntary removal. The state of Georgia decreed that the government was dissolved in 1828, three years after the creation of the constitution. No battle deaths.
- Mexican–American War: Mexican President Mariano Paredes was a general who took power in a coup d'état.
- Sonderbund War: less than 200 battle deaths. Democracy was less than three years old in Zürich, which was the leading Protestant Canton. The Catholic cantons restricted the suffrage to Catholic men and often also to a group that descended from the original inhabitants. The Protestants and liberals attempted a rebellion in Catholic Lucerne but were defeated. Some fled what they called a Catholic "reign of terror." Lucerne announced that Jesuits would be responsible for the educational system. That was perceived as evidence that Lucerne was now a regime under the thumb of the autocratic Pope. A private expedition of volunteers tried to "liberate" Lucerne but failed. The perceptions of lack of democracy was strengthened when the Catholic cantons refused to comply with the majority of the Swiss Federal Council and turned for aid to foreign Catholic powers, like the Habsburgs.
- The war between the French Second Republic and the Roman Republic: both young democracies less than three years old. The Pope had promised to excommunicate those that took part in the elections, leaving only inexperienced radicals in the Roman government during the few months that it existed. The French President and later Emperor Louis Napoleon needed support from the conservative Catholics and the military. The young French assembly was led to believe that the French expedition was a simple police action to restore order in a chaotic regime and to protect Rome from foreign monarchies that planned an intervention. The army officers on the scene distrusted everything republican and, despite the unexpected, resistance launched an attack and conquered Rome without a mandate from the French assembly. The news caused violent uprisings in France. The critics called the military repression "the Roman expedition into the interior."
- The Confederate States of America was less than three years old at the start of the war. Less than two thirds of the adult male population could vote in the Confederacy, which was created to continue the suppression of black slaves. Wealthy planters played on racial fears to avoid criticism from poor whites. Abolitionists were censored and imprisoned even before Abraham Lincoln was elected, and he was not on the ballot in most of the South. In the first elections in the Confederacy, voters in many areas again had no choice of candidates.
- War of the Pacific: only one man in fifty could vote in Chile and Peru.
- First Boer War: Britain was not a liberal democracy before Representation of the People Act 1884. The new Boer state was less than three years old, and the black population was excluded from the franchise.
- Spanish–American War: all males in Spain could vote, and the constitution theoretically protected many civil liberties. However, there was the turno system of corrupt officials manipulating the elections to return to office as many of their own party as they wished, dissidents were jailed, the monarchy retained important powers, and a military coup d'état was feared if Spain compromised during the negotiations.
- Fashoda Incident: no battle deaths.
- Philippine–American War: no democratic elections in the Philippines. The Philippine regime was less than three years old. One group of Filipinos had proclaimed a constitution, which explicitly gave the power to a small group of landowners and professionals. Emilio Aguinaldo was declared president without elections and was suspected of killing two of his main political rivals, and nearly all foreign observers saw no chance for genuine self-government but only different regional groups and bandits. US President William McKinley stated that it would be immoral to withdraw and to let the Filipinos either fight one another or be occupied by a European power.
- Second Boer War: only a minority of white males had the right to vote in the Boer states. White Uitlanders were excluded from the franchise in Transvaal.
- World War I: the German Reichstag was elected by all adult males and overwhelmingly voted to fund the war. However, German Kaiser retained most of the power. All appointments to bureaucracy, the armed forces, and the diplomatic forces were made at his sole discretion. It was common knowledge that the army strongly supported him and would arrest his opponents if he desired. Open criticisms could be and were punished as lese majesty. The German chancellor in 1913 ignored a vote of no confidence by explaining that he served at the discretion of the Kaiser alone. The Reichstag was not consulted regarding the declaration of war but only informed after the fact that its support was required to approve the allocation of funds for the defence against Tsarist Russia.
- Irish War of Independence: Weart's argument is that the Irish state was less than three years old. The initial violence involved rebels acting on their own outside democratic control. Later, democratic control of the Irish Republican Army was doubtful and immediately after the war since part of it tried to overthrow the government during the Irish Civil War. However, the war had the support of 73 of Ireland's 103 Westminster Members of Parliament.
- Occupation of the Ruhr: no battle deaths.
- Continuation War: eventually, the United Kingdom reluctantly issued a formal declaration of war on Finland because of pressure from Soviet Union. Britain sent bombers to impede mining under German control, but the British were not attacking the Finns. The formal declaration meant nothing but some financial restrictions and the seizure of shipping. Also, Weart argues that Finland had become so authoritarian during the war that it was not a clear democracy anymore since had imprisoned opposition leaders in a secret prison, and most decisions were taken by a tiny clique of leaders.
- Cod Wars: no battle deaths.
- Turkish invasion of Cyprus: initial hostilities occurred after a coup d'état in Cyprus. Both the later formally democratic regime in Cyprus and that in Turkey were less than three years old. The military retained significant influence in both.
- Paquisha War: both young democracies less than three years old and lacked democratic control over the military. About 200 battle deaths occurred.

== Crusade for democracy ==
Weart finds that nations have often tried to spread their political system to other nations. He finds many failed attempts to impose democracy by military intervention. For example, during the early part of the 20th century the United States sent soldiers to many nations in Central America to hold free elections but with little long-term success. The attempts that succeeded, like occupied Japan after World War II, involved drastic change of the whole political culture. Weart argues that it is generally better to spread democracy by diplomacy and by slowly promoting internal political change.

== Criticisms ==
Reviews of the book have ranged from positive to negative.

=== Statistically based critiques ===
One criticism is that Weart makes no attempt to use statistics to prove that the findings are statistically significant. That would be very difficult to do if all of human history were included. The many statistical studies on that subject have almost always limited themselves to the period after 1815. There are prefabricated data sets available, which list for example all battle deaths for all nations. Weart instead uses the well-known "small N" method often used by historians and social scientists: comparative case studies. Especially by looking at many ambiguous cases, it is possible to sift out a set of features that decide if a pair of regimes makes war or avoids it. Weart has not done this formally, but it would be easy to do from the cases in the book.

=== Critiques of methodology ===
Some find Weart's use of sources questionable, particularly regarding the conflicts in antiquity. He excludes the earlier wars of Rome, including the Punic Wars, by stating that there are no primary sources and no reliable secondary sources, such as by a historian who could understand Punic, from Carthage, which makes it impossible to determine the exact form of government at the start of these wars. However, he uses Xenophon for other conflicts, who has also been doubted as a reliable source although not for the same reason. Also, many modern classicists agree that Rome and Carthage were oligarchic republics, "which suggests that excluding them was a largely arbitrary judgment that just happened to leave Weart's central claim intact." However, Weart states that there have been some wars between oligarchies and so they would add to his list, not disprove his statement.

The Sicilian Expedition is sometimes mentioned as a war between somewhat-democratic states. Some democratic peace researchers have excluded the states in Ancient Greece because of the limited franchise and the use of allotment to select many government leaders. As noted earlier, Weart classifies Athens as a democracy and argues that the war was actually an example of a war between a democracy and an oligarchy. However, he also states, "The possibility that the Athenians were wrong suggests a qualification to our rule. Instead of saying that well-established democracies do not make war on their own kind, perhaps we should say that they do not make war on other states they perceive to be democracies."

Critics argue that there is no ancient evidence for this perception and that the major source on Syracuse democracy is Thucydides, an Athenian. Weart states Aristotle, an Athenian metic, the only scholar who ever possessed the documents required to study the constitution of Syracuse, carefully avoided calling Syracuse a democracy. One of the main reasons for the Sicilian Expedition was that Syracuse was reported to have violent factional strife. Help from an inside group was essential since the Greeks lacked effective siege machinery, and the expedition was ill-suited for the alternative, a long wait to starve the defenders. In every other known case of cities being betrayed to an Athenian army, it was by a democratic faction. Furthermore, scholars have argued that Thucydides disliked democracy, which affected his descriptions and evaluations. Weart's argument on the Sicilian Expedition is similar to the position of the prominent scholar G.E.M. de Ste. Croix.

The same review also includes a list of possible wars between Greek oligarchies, including the recurrent wars between Sparta and Argos. Weart mentions the wars in a footnote with references in which he states that Argos was a democracy.

=== Alternate explanations for democratic peace ===
JM Owen, in a generally friendly review, questions Weart's conclusion that universal democracy will mean lasting peace. If Weart's explanation for the democratic peace is true and also depends on perception, democratic leaders may misperceive each other as authoritarian. More seriously, if the outgroup of oligarchs disappears, what will prevent the democracies from dividing into a new ingroup and outgroup? (Weart later suggested that there would be a tendency to promote an internal outgroup such as criminals, perverts, or terrorists.)

There are many other proposed explanations for the democratic peace. For example, a game-theoretic explanation for the democratic peace is that the public and the open debate in democracies send clear and reliable information regarding the intentions to other states. In contrast, it is difficult to know the intentions of nondemocratic leaders, what effect concessions will have and if promises will be kept. Thus, there will be mistrust and unwillingness to make concessions if at least one of the parties in a dispute is not a democracy.
