= Cincinnati Radiation Experiments =

Human radiation experiments in Ohio

The Cincinnati Radiation Experiments were a series of total and partial body irradiation tests performed on at least 90 patients with advanced cancer at the Cincinnati General Hospital, now University of Cincinnati Hospital, from 1960 to 1971. Led by radiologist Eugene L. Saenger, the experiments were funded in part by the Defense Atomic Support Agency within the Department of Defense to study how soldiers in nuclear war would be affected by large doses of radiation. The experiments were conducted without patient consent in the first five years of the study and with disputed levels of consent thereafter. The irradiated patients experienced nausea, vomiting, cognitive impairment, and death. Twenty one patients died within one month. The contract between the researchers and the DOD terminated in 1972 under pressure from Senator Edward Kennedy, marking the end of major human irradiation experimentation in the U.S. that began after World War II and continued throughout the Cold War Era.

Although initially fading from public eye, the controversy resurfaced in 1993 and was soon investigated by President Bill Clinton's Advisory Committee on Human Radiation Experiments. In 1994, families of the patients filed a class-action lawsuit against the team of 15 researchers. Five years later, the University of Cincinnati settled the case for over $4 million.

== Experiments and controversies ==
=== Department of Defense funding ===
On September 25, 1958, Saenger sent a grant proposal entitled "Metabolic Changes in Human following Total Body Radiation" to the Department of Defense, requesting $25,085 to analyze the amino-aciduria levels in the urine of total body irradiated patients. Although multiple military researchers, including the Director of the Division of Nuclear Medicine and Chemistry, wrote to the US Army Medical Research and Development Command that they doubted the practical value of Saenger's proposed study, the DOD approved the grant proposal due to its possibility of evaluating the combat effectiveness of soldiers in nuclear warfare. The initial grant proposal evolved into an 11-year contract, in which the DOD provided a total of $671,482.79 in funds. Detailing the progress of the experiment were a series of 10 progress reports sent to the DOD from 1960 to 1972, the first five of which were entitled "Metabolic Changes in Humans Following Total Body Irradiation" and the last five "Radiation Effects in Man: Manifestations and Therapeutic Efforts." The irradiation experiments only began after the DOD funding was received, with the first known experiment occurring on May 24, 1960.

There is controversy regarding how the DOD funds were allocated. Saenger maintained that while the DOD funds were used to buy irradiation equipment, run laboratory tests, and hire personnel, only University funds directly financed the patients' irradiation treatment. However, the Advisory Committee on Human Radiation Experiments held that without the DOD funds, Saenger could not have begun the irradiation tests.

=== Military purpose ===
As part of the DOD contract, the radiation experiments attempted to imitate nuclear wartime conditions in order to accurately evaluate the cognitive and physiological effects of radiation on a soldier. During irradiation, patients' bodies were positioned to mirror a soldier's defensive position; the radiation was intended, but not proven, to be administered unidirectionally to reflect a soldier's exposure; and the irradiation was administered all at once, which diverged from the standard medical practice at the time, where cancer patients were given small doses cumulatively to maximize destruction of cancer cells. Even so, in the progress reports sent to the DOD and in his testimony to the Subcommittee on Administrative Law and Governmental Relations in 1994, Saenger maintained that the primary goal of the study was to provide palliative and therapeutic care to the patients. According to Saenger, the study of radiation effects on a soldier's performance was a secondary goal.

=== Patient selection ===
The patients were referred to Dr. Saenger's experiments by the Cincinnati General Hospital's Tumor Clinic. All the patients had advanced stage cancers, including breast, lung, colon, pancreas, skin, sinus, ovarian, lymph, cervical, rectal, liver, stomach, esophagus, bowel, tongue, brain, tonsil, rectum, intestinal, and bone cancers. Although they were all cancerous, Saenger sought patients that were in good nutritional health, and who had not been exposed to previous radiation treatment.

The patient selection process was the subject of another controversy. David Egilman, a doctor practicing in Massachusetts at the time, criticized the patient selection and irradiation processes in a statement to the Advisory Committee on Human Radiation Experiments, writing that many of the cancers were radio-resistant and could not have been treated effectively without killing the patient. On the other hand, the American College of Radiology, after sending representatives to Saenger's laboratory during the irradiation experiments, concluded in a 1972 peer review that the patient selection process and the experiments as a whole "conformed with good medical practice."

=== Health effects ===
The experiments administered between 25 and 300 rad of Cobalt-60 total body and partial body irradiation, comparable to 20,000 chest x-rays, within hours. There were also plans to increase the radiation dosage to 600 rad. In addition, bone marrow was occasionally extracted prior to the irradiation and later reinfused in an effort to alleviate the debilitating health effects of the radiation.

The irradiated patients experienced a wide variety of side-effects: nausea, vomiting, diarrhea, emaciation, hemorrhaging, fatigue, cognitive impairment, and hallucinations. In the first month 21 patients died. 1/4 of the patients died within 2 months of irradiation, and over 3/4 of the patients died within a year. In his testimony, Dr. Saenger maintained that assessing the direct contribution of the irradiation to the mortality rates is impossible due to the variety of health factors acting as confounding variables: prior chemotherapy treatment, localized radiation treatment, and the advanced stage cancer itself. He claimed that the cancer was the primary factor in the patients' deaths, and that the irradiation had palliative benefits for 31% of the patients.

=== Consent forms ===
From 1960 to 1965, no written consent forms were used in the experiments, in accordance with the requirements of the Cincinnati General Hospital; the Department of Health, Education, and Welfare; and the Department of Defense. In April 1965, the patients were given consent forms that, according to Dr. Saenger, appropriately discussed the dangers of the irradiation. However, David Egilman claimed that these forms did not mention any relevant side effects of the irradiation.

In 1969, the National Institutes of Health evaluated the Cincinnati General Hospital's ethical practices, prompting Saenger to adopt a new consent form outlining the purpose, procedure, and risks of the irradiation tests to the patients. Even so, no consent form used mentioned possible death.

During the 1994 trial, family members of the patients alleged that the researchers forged certain patients' signatures on the consent forms.

=== Researchers ===
- Dr. Eugene L. Saenger
- Dr. Edward B. Silberstein
- Dr. Bernard S. Aron
- Dr. Harry Horwitz
- Dr. James G. Kereiakes
- Dr. Harold Perry
- Dr. Ben I. Friedman
- Dr. Thomas Wright
- Dr. I-wen Chen
- Dr. Robert L. Kunkel
- Dr. Louis A. Gottschalk
- Dr. Theodore H. Wold
- Dr. Goldine Gleser
- Dr. Warren O. Kessler
- Dr. Myron I. Varon

== Patients ==
=== Statistics ===
Although only 89 patients have been identified, medical records indicate that at least 90 patients were involved in the experiments. Moreover, the progress reports sent to the DOD suggest that 10 additional individuals were irradiated whose treatments were not included in the medical records.

Approximately 43% of the known patients were female, and 57% male.

The average age of the patients was 59, but three children aged 9, 10, and 13 were also irradiated.

To see a list of the 89 identified patients, see Appendix 1 of The Treatment: The Story of Those Who Died in the Cincinnati Radiation Tests by Martha Stephens.

=== Socioeconomic status ===
The average patient had 5 years of formal education, with an average IQ of 89. 62% were African-American, and the majority were working class. A report published in 1972 claimed that the socioeconomic status of the patients matched the general makeup of the Cincinnati General Hospital.

== Institutional review (1958–1972) ==
From the initial budget proposal in 1958 to 1966, the University of Cincinnati had no institutional review boards (IRBs) that evaluated the ethical practices of the Cincinnati Radiation Experiments, and IRBs were not formally required by law for government-funded research until 1974. In 1966, however, the University created the Faculty Committee on Research (FCR) in compliance with an order from the US Public Health Service, an IRB that conducted multiple reviews of the experiments' proposed research protocols.

In March 1966, Dr. Saenger proposed an additional research plan called "Protection of Humans with Stored Autologous Marrow" in an effort to expand his research to investigate the palliative effects of bone marrow extraction and reinfusion. While the FCR initially deemed the plan inadequate for not properly informing the patients of potential risks of the treatment, a revised proposal in 1967 entitled "The Therapeutic Effect of Total Body Irradiation Followed by Infusion of Stored Autologous Marrow in Humans" received varying levels of approval by the members of the FCR. Dr. George Shields claimed the mortality rate of the experiments at that point in the experiments (25%) was too high, stating that if the proposal was to be approved, the patients would have to be explicitly told of the "1 in 4 chance of death within a few weeks due to treatment." Other members of the FCR such as Dr. R. L. Witt and Dr. Edward P. Radford recommended approval of the study only under the provisions that the researchers clearly outline the therapeutic goals and palliative likelihood of the experiments.

On May 23, 1967, the new bone marrow transplant protocol was approved with the provision that the experiments solely focus on the "therapeutic efficacy of whole body irradiation." The FCR did not follow up on its provisions, however, until 1970, when it deemed the experimental protocol to be inadequate, particularly with regard to the effectiveness of the bone marrow infusions in alleviating the debilitating effects of the total body irradiation. Even so, the FCR reapproved the experiments on August 9, 1971.

In April 1972, another proposal entitled "Evaluation of the therapeutic effectiveness of total and partial body irradiation as compared to chemotherapy in humans with carcinoma of the lung and colon" was sent to the FCR, but the president of the University of Cincinnati soon terminated the contract between the DOD and the UC researchers in a deal with Senator Edward Kennedy following negative press coverage of the experiments. The new protocol was put on hold until August 1972, when it was finally approved by the FCR as part of a grant proposal sent to the National Institutes of Health. The NIH, however, rejected the proposal in February 1973, cutting off all outside funds for the experiments.

== Press coverage and Department of Defense contract termination (1971–1972) ==
Dr. Saenger's contract with the Department of Defense first gained public attention when the Washington Post broke the story on October 8, 1971, following investigative journalism by Roger Rapoport. Three days later, the University of Cincinnati held a news conference on the experiments, which prompted three separate investigations of the experiments by the American College of Radiology, the Ad Hoc Review Committee of the University of Cincinnati, and the Junior Faculty Association of the University of Cincinnati, whose reports were all published in January, 1972.

The Junior Faculty Association's report, entitled "Report to the Campus Community," was written by Martha Stephens, an English professor at the University of Cincinnati. Stephens based the report on Saenger's progress reports sent to the DOD, which were released to Stephens by Dr. Edwall Gall, the then Director of the University of Cincinnati Medical Center. The JFA's report evolved into a news conference on January 25, 1972, which prompted the Washington Post to publish the JFA's report's findings the next day. While Saenger and Dr. Silberstein criticized the JFA's report, asserting that "the only unfavorable comments had come from a handful of local, and non-medical junior faculty members" in their unpublished article "Ethics on Trial: Medical, Congressional and Journalistic," the report and the accompanying Washington Post article drew Senator Edward Kennedy's attention, who was already investigating medical experimentation in the United States.

As part of his investigation of the Cincinnati Radiation Experiments, Senator Kennedy sought interviews with the patients, an effort resisted by Saenger and Silberstein. In April 1972, Senator Kennedy, Ohio governor John Gilligan, and Warren Bennis, the then president of the University of Cincinnati, met and agreed to halt the political investigations of the Cincinnati Radiation Experiments if the contract between the UC researchers and the Department of Defense was terminated.

== Renewed press coverage and Congressional Hearing (1993–1994) ==
Although initially fading from public eye after the termination of the DOD contract and the discontinuation of the Kennedy investigation, the Cincinnati Radiation Experiments resurfaced in November 1993 as a result of Eileen Welsome's investigative journalism in the Albuquerque Tribune. While primarily concerned with the Cold War tests at Los Alamos, Welsome's articles prompted the Department of Energy to renew investigations of Cold War human experimentation, and in January 1994, Cincinnati's WKRC Channel 12 news contacted Martha Stephens, the original author of the JFA report. WKRC then aired a program featuring a debate between Stephens, who attacked the experiments, and Congressman David S. Mann, who defended the experiments and the Cincinnati General Hospital.

Following this televised program was a tide of local press coverage which led to the Cincinnati Radiation Experiment's story being covered in the New York Times. According to Martha Stephens, the widespread publicity forced David Mann to reverse his political position on the experiments to appeal to his constituents in the upcoming 1994 Congressional Democratic primary election, and David Mann soon called for a Congressional hearing on the experiments. Occurring on April 11, 1994, in Cincinnati, The Hearing Before the Subcommittee on Administrative Law and Government Relations of the Committee on the Judiciary provided information on the experiments to President Bill Clinton's Advisory Committee on Human Radiation Experiments, and featured testimonies of the relatives of the patients as well as Dr. Saenger's only public testimony on the experiments. A primary concern of the hearing was to evaluate whether or not the families of the patients should be monetarily compensated.

== Trials (1994–1999) ==
The renewed publicity also prompted Martha Stephens and Laura Schneider, a graduate student at the University of Cincinnati, to investigate the identities of the patients and their family members. Bob Newman, a human rights attorney, agreed to represent the identified families in a class action lawsuit filed on February 17, 1994, against the individual researchers, the University of Cincinnati, and the City of Cincinnati.

In the lawsuit, the families alleged that the experiments violated the patients' rights to due process of law, equal protection under the law, privacy, and access to the courts. Although the individual researchers sought immunity as "publicly employed physicians," District Court Judge Sandra Beckwith dismissed the defendants' claims, citing the Nuremberg Code's ethical guidelines for human experimentation established in the Nuremberg Nazi doctor trials following World War II.

After numerous hearings in In Re Cincinnati Radiation Litigation, on May 4, 1999, Judge Beckwith settled the case for over $4 million, paid by the University, the City, and the individual researchers.

In addition to the settlement, the trial demanded the creation of a memorial plaque for the patients of the Cincinnati Radiation Experiments. In October 1999, the plaque with the words "In Memoriam: Radiation Effects Study 1960–1972" was erected near the building of the Cincinnati General Hospital where the experiments were performed. However, in June 2001, the building housing the General Hospital was demolished to construct a parking garage, and the plaque was moved to a courtyard near the current University Hospital's outpatient treatment clinic.
