= International Journal of Occupational and Environmental Health =

- Discipline: Public health, occupational health
- Language: English
- Edited by: Andrew Maier

Publication details
- History: 1995–2018
- Publisher: Maney Publishing; Routledge
- Frequency: Quarterly
- Impact factor: 1.195 (2017)

Standard abbreviations
- ISO 4: Int. J. Occup. Environ. Health

Indexing
- CODEN: IOEHFU
- ISSN: 1077-3525 (print); 2049-3967 (web)
- LCCN: 95652867
- OCLC no.: 60627199

Links
- Journal homepage; Online access; Online archive

The International Journal of Occupational and Environmental Health was a quarterly peer-reviewed public health journal with a focus on occupational and environmental health. It was established in 1995 and was published by Routledge. The last editor-in-chief was Andrew Maier (University of Cincinnati).

== History ==
The journal was established in 1995, and was originally published by Maney Publishing. Its founding editor-in-chief was Joseph LaDou (University of California, San Francisco), who initially spent between $50,000 and $75,000 of his own money each year to keep publishing the journal. David Egilman (Brown University) replaced LaDou as the journal's editor-in-chief in 2007. As of 2009, it was the official journal of the International Commission on Occupational Health. Along with the rest of Maney's portfolio, the journal was acquired by Taylor & Francis in 2015, which ceased publishing it in 2018.

== Recognition ==
A 2000 article in Occupational and Environmental Medicine identified the International Journal of Occupational and Environmental Health as one of the eight most prominent journals in the occupational health field. Epidemiologist David Michaels told ProPublica in 2017 that the journal was one of the few publications where "scientists whose work is independent of the corporations that manufacture chemicals" could publish their research, adding, "The silencing of that voice would be a real loss to the field."

== Editorial board controversy ==
Shortly after acquiring the journal in 2015, Taylor & Francis angered the editorial board by appointing Andrew Maier as the journal's new editor-in-chief without consulting the board. In an April 2017 letter to Taylor & Francis, the board's 22 members called attention to their concerns about some of the publisher's recent practices. The editors stated in the letter that, had they been consulted, they probably would not have approved of Maier's appointment, citing the tendency of his research to reach conclusions favorable to entities with conflicts of interest in the topic. The editorial board members also criticized Taylor & Francis for retracting a paper by Egilman with no explanation. The following month, Taylor & Francis managing director Ian Bannerman responded to the letter, claiming that he had consulted editorial board member Jukka Takala before offering Maier the position of editor-in-chief. Takala, who had signed the original letter, told Retraction Watch that, in fact, he had not been contacted prior to Maier's appointment.

In November 2017, the editorial board sent a letter to the National Library of Medicine asking for the journal to be removed from MEDLINE. Later that month, the entire board resigned in protest. In their letter sent to Bannerman, the editors cited Taylor & Francis' appointment of Maier as editor-in-chief, as well as the company's unexplained retraction of Egilman's paper, as among the reasons for their resignation.

== Abstracting and indexing ==
The journal is abstracted and indexed in:

- Chemical Abstracts Service
- CINAHL
- Current Contents/Clinical Medicine
- Current Contents/Social & Behavioral Sciences
- Embase/Excerpta Medica
- Index Medicus/MEDLINE/PubMed
- Science Citation Index Expanded
- Scopus
- Social Sciences Citation Index

According to the Journal Citation Reports, the journal had an impact factor of 1.195 in 2017.
