= Joseph LaDou =

American physician (1938–2023)

- Born: August 19, 1938; Salem, Oregon
- Died: November 10, 2023 (aged 85)
- Education: University of California, San Francisco
- Known for: Occupational and environmental medicine

Joseph LaDou (August 19, 1938 – November 10, 2023), was an American occupational and environmental medicine physician who practiced in Silicon Valley during the early years of the semiconductor and computer industries. In 1983, he was appointed the first Chief of the University of California, San Francisco (MC) Division of Occupational and Environmental Medicine, and was co-director of the residency program there from 1982-1991. LaDou was founding editor-in-chief of the International Journal of Occupational and Environmental Health, serving in that capacity from 1992 to 2005. During the same years, LaDou was director of UCSF's International Center for Occupational Medicine.

== Career ==
From 1983 to 2002, in addition to his other responsibilities, LaDou was the director to "Advances in Occupational and Environmental Medicine", a continuing medical education course that trained more than 3,000 physicians (500 from developing countries) in occupational medicine.

LaDou's study of the global migration of hazardous industries led to efforts to control occupational and environmental hazards. As one example, his study of asbestos in developing countries (LaDou, 2004) led to a call for an international ban on asbestos mining and use in commercial products. Following retirement, LaDou was Professor Emeritus of Medicine at UCSF.

LaDou died on November 10, 2023, at the age of 85.

== Works ==
Among LaDou's notable publications:

- LaDou, Joseph, ed. 1986. Special Issue on "The Microelectronics Industry," State of the Art Reviews: Occupational Medicine 1 (1, January–March). Philadelphia: Hanley and Belfus.
- LaDou, Joseph, and Timothy Rohm. 1998. "The International Electronics Industry," International Journal of Occupational and Environmental Health 4 (1): 1-18.
- LaDou, Joseph. 2003. "International Occupational Health," International Journal of Hygiene and Environmental Health 206:303-313.
- LaDou, Joseph. 2004. "The Asbestos Cancer Epidemic", Environmental Health Perspectives 112 (3): 285-90.
- LaDou, Joseph. 2006. "Occupational Medicine in the United States: A Proposal to Abolish Workers’ Compensation and Reestablish the Public Health Model," International Journal of Occupational and Environmental Health 12 (2): 154-168.
- LaDou, Joseph, and John C. Bailar III. 2007. "Cancer and Reproductive Risks in the Semiconductor Industry," International Journal of Occupational and Environmental Health 13 (4): 376-385.
- LaDou, Joseph, and Sandra Lovegrove. 2008. "Electronics Waste Export," International Journal of Occupational and Environmental Health 14 (1) :1-10.
- LaDou, Joseph. 2010. "Worker's Compensation in the United States: Cost Shifting and Inequities in a Dysfunctional System," New Solutions 20 (3): 291-302.
- LaDou, Joseph. 2011. "The European Influence on Workers’ Compensation Reform in the United States", Environmental Health 10 (1): 103.
- LaDou, Joseph. 2012. "Workers’ Compensation Reform," Int J Occup Environ Health 18 (2): 92-5.
- LaDou, Joseph, Leslie London, and Andrew Watterson. 2018. "Occupational Health: A World of False Promises," Environmental Health 17 (1): 81. doi:10.1186/s12940-018-0422-x.
- LaDou, Joseph, and Robert J. Harrison, eds. 2021. Current Diagnosis & Treatment: Occupational & Environmental Medicine, 6th ed. McGraw-Hill Medical, New York. ISBN 978-1260143430

== Honors ==
- Ramazzini Award, conferred by the Collegium Ramazzini, Carpi, Italy, for achievements in the field of occupational medicine, 1998
- Harriet Hardy Award, New England College of Occupational and Environmental Medicine, 2005
