= Brian Black =

American historian

Brian Black is an American professor of history and environmental studies at Pennsylvania State University at Altoona and head of its department of Arts and Humanities. He received a Bachelor of Arts in English in 1988 from Gettysburg College, a Master of Arts in American Civilization in 1991 from New York University and a Doctor of Education degree in American Studies from the University of Kansas in 1996.

== Books ==
Black is the author of :

- Petrolia: The Landscape of America's First Oil Boom (Johns Hopkins, 2003; ISBN 0801877326, ISBN 978-0801877322)
- Crude Reality: Petroleum in World History (Rowman & Littlefield, 2012, ISBN 0742556549, ISBN 978-0742556546), selected as a CHOICE outstanding academic book for 2012

He is the editor of:

- Climate Change: An Encyclopedia of History and Science (4 vols, ISBN 1598847619, ISBN 978-1598847611)

== Other publications ==
- Gettysburg Contested, August 15, 2013 | ISBN 1938086120 | ISBN 978-1938086120
- Nature and the Environment in Twentieth-Century American Life, May 30, 2006 | ISBN 0313332002 | ISBN 978-0313332005
- Nature and the Environment in Nineteenth-Century American Life, April 30, 2006 | ISBN 0313332010 | ISBN 978-0313332012
- America at War!: Battles That Turned the Tide, 1992 ISBN 0-590-45505-2
- Nature's Entrepot, November 16, 2012 | ISBN 0822944170 | ISBN 978-0822944171
- Alternative Energy, February 26, 2010 | ISBN 0313344841 | ISBN 978-0313344848
- Global Warming, June 2, 2010 | ISBN 0313345228 | ISBN 978-0313345227
- Great Debates in American Environmental History, May 30, 2008 | ISBN 0313339309 | ISBN 978-0313339301
