= Paul Rauber =

Paul Rauber is a Senior Editor at the Sierra Magazine, the publication of the Sierra Club, a United States environmental organization founded by conservationist pioneer John Muir in 1892.

In 2004 he published a book with Carl Pope, Strategic Ignorance: Why the Bush Administration Is Recklessly Destroying a Century of Environmental Progress, from Sierra Club Books. An excerpt from the book, titled Saving the Environment was published in The Nation magazine.

Paul's older brother, Chris Rauber, is also a journalist.

== Writings ==
- Rauber, Paul (2003). "Here we go again: What's more important: running a Green for president or beating Bush?". Sierra Magazine.
