= The Discovery of Global Warming =

Book by Spencer R. Weart

- Author: Spencer R. Weart
- Language: English
- Publisher: Harvard University Press
- Publication date: 2003
- Publication place: United States
- Media type: Print (Paperback) & online version
- Pages: 240 pp
- ISBN: 0-674-03189-X

The Discovery of Global Warming is a book by physicist and historian Spencer R. Weart published in 2003; revised and updated edition, 2008. It traces the history of scientific discoveries that led to the current scientific opinion on climate change. It has been translated into Spanish, Japanese, Italian, Arabic, Chinese and Korean.

== Reviews ==
- Christie, Maureen (March–April 2004). "Hot Topic". American Scientist.
- Ehrlich, Robert (April 2004). "Heat exchange: the global warming debate mixes daunting complexity with high political stakes, a toxic brew that continues to test dispassionate science". Natural History.
- Maurellis, Ahilleas (May 2004). "Warming to the story of climate change". Physics World. 17 (5): 46. doi:10.1088/2058-7058/17/5/38. Archived from the original on 2012-02-17.
- Schneider, Stephen H. (15 January 2004). "Warning of warming". Nature. 427 (6971): 197–8. Bibcode:2004Natur.427..197S. doi:10.1038/427197a.
- Revkin, Andrew C. (5 October 2003). "Living in the Greenhouse". New York Times.
- Crowley, Thomas J. (30 April 2004). "Something Warm, Something New". Science. 304 (5671): 685–6. doi:10.1126/science.1094781. S2CID 140638683.
- Oppenheimer, Michael (2004). "The Discovery of Global Warming. By Spencer R. Weart". Environmental History. 9 (2): 327–8. doi:10.2307/3986102. JSTOR 3986102.

== See also ==
- History of climate change science
