= The End of Oil =

2004 book by Paul Roberts

The End of Oil: On the Edge of a Perilous New World
- Cover of the Mariner Books edition
- Author: Paul Roberts
- Language: English
- Subject: The various problems associated with humanity's reliance on oil and other fossil fuels
- Genre: Non-fiction
- Publisher: Houghton Mifflin
- Publication date: 2004
- Publication place: United States
- Pages: 400
- ISBN: 978-0-618-23977-1
- OCLC: 54407950
- Dewey Decimal: 333.79 22
- LC Class: HD9650.6 .R63 2004
- Followed by: The End of Food

The End of Oil: On the Edge of a Perilous New World is a non-fiction book by American journalist and author Paul Roberts. Published in 2004, it is Roberts' book-length debut. It provides an analysis of the various problems associated with humanity's reliance on oil and other fossil fuels such as coal and natural gas.

== Synopsis ==
Though The End of Oil is not a chronological history of humanity's use of fossil fuels, Roberts begins by recounting how Thomas Newcomen, in 1712, presented the first large steam engine, and thus helped spark the Industrial Revolution. He then goes on to explain the problems that have since developed or may develop in the future, from humanity's reliance on oil and its "geological siblings", coal and natural gas. While there is a chapter on hydrogen as a possible alternative to oil (not as an energy source, but as an energy carrier), the book is not focused on any one solution to the problems it lays out.

According to Roberts, oil faces three major dilemmas. Most importantly, all fossil fuels are by their very nature limited in supply; as far as oil is concerned, the resulting dilemma is best known as the question of peak oil. Further, much of the oil consumed by affluent countries such as the United States is extracted in countries that are rather unstable politically, such as some of the members of the OPEC. The oil trade is therefore prone to become intertwined with international relations, although the nature of this interplay is highly controversial, with some citing oil as a reason for conflicts such as the Iraq War and others denying such claims. Finally, since the burning of fossil fuels releases carbon dioxide that was previously locked in the ground, humanity's reliance on oil may contribute to global warming.

As to the aims of the book, Roberts states at the end of the prologue:

I am under no illusions that this book addresses all the important aspects of the evolving energy economy, or even most of them. Energy is a vast topic, with millions of components interwoven in a complex and everchanging pattern that defies quick answers or simple truths. Instead, my hope is to provide an introduction, a way for nonexperts to begin to think about what experts have long known: that energy is the single most important resource, that our current energy system is failing, and that the shape of the next energy economy is being decided right now—with or without our input.

== Predictions for the price of oil ==
At various points in the book, Roberts makes cautious predictions for the price of oil. These were soon proved to be, if anything, too optimistic. For example, citing Arab Oil and Gas magazine as a source, Roberts wrote that "in the next five to ten years", if there were to be any large disruption in supply, "prices could easily be bid up past sixty dollars a barrel and kept there for months". Prices passed the sixty-dollar mark as early as June 2005, thirteen months after the book was first published.

However, by 2009, oil prices had fallen back under the sixty-dollar mark.

== Reception ==
The End of Oil received some positive reviews from American newspapers and review publications. Notably, environmentalist Bill McKibben, in an article for the New York Review of Books, described it as "perhaps the best single book ever produced about our energy economy and its environmental implications." Fellow author Joseph J. Romm, whose The Hype about Hydrogen had been published a few weeks before The End of Oil, called the book "fascinating" and "a stinging rebuke of America's myopic, do-nothing energy policy." In 2005, it was a finalist for the New York Public Library's Helen Bernstein Book Award.

== Editions ==
- Roberts, Paul (2004). The End of Oil. On the Edge of a Perilous New World. Boston: Houghton Mifflin. ISBN 978-0-618-23977-1.
- Roberts, Paul (2005). The End of Oil. On the Edge of a Perilous New World. With a new afterword. Boston: Mariner Books. ISBN 978-0-618-56211-4.
- Roberts, Paul (2005). The End of Oil. The Decline of the Petroleum Economy and the Rise of a New Energy Order. London: Bloomsbury Publishing. ISBN 978-0-7475-7081-3.
