= Hilary French =

American environmental analyst

Hilary F. French is a environmental analyst. She is a Program Officer at the United Nations Environment Programme's Regional Office for North America.

French is educated at Dartmouth College and the Fletcher School of Law and Diplomacy.

French worked previously for many years at Worldwatch Institute, where she served in many capacities, including as Vice President for Research, as Director of the Globalization and Governance Project, as Senior Advisor for Programs, and as a Senior Researcher. French interned for the United Nations in the Ivory Coast and in Geneva at the UN Development Program and the UN Institute for Disarmament Research and worked briefly for Ashoka before joining Worldwatch in 1987.

In addition to Worldwatch documents, French is the author of Vanishing Borders: Protecting the Planet in the Age of Globalization (Norton, 2000) which has been widely translated.

She is married to Christopher Flavin, President Emeritus of Worldwatch Institute, also a environmental and resource analyst.

== Bibliography ==
- Hilary F. French (December 1994). "Making Environmental Treaties Work". Scientific American. 271 (6): 62–65. Bibcode:1994SciAm.271f..94F. doi:10.1038/scientificamerican1294-94.
