= Challenging the Chip =

Book by Ted Smith

- Author: Ted Smith, David A Sonnenfeld, and David Naguib Pellow
- Subject: Labor rights, environmental justice
- Publisher: Temple University Press
- Publication date: 2006
- Pages: 357
- ISBN: 1-59213-330-4

Challenging the Chip is a 2006 book on "labor rights and environmental justice in the global electronics industry" edited by Ted Smith, David A. Sonnenfeld, and David Naguib Pellow. It is published by Temple University Press. In three parts, the book looks at global electronics, environmental justice and labor rights, and electronic waste and extended producer responsibility. In four appendices, the book also deals with the principles of environmental justice, the computer take-back campaign, sample shareholder resolutions, and the electronics recycler's pledge of true stewardship.

This 357-page book was put together by "scores of people around the world (who) have been involved over the course of several years in the conceptualization, development, editing and production (of it)".

== "New wave of technology" ==
In his foreword to the text, former Texas Agriculture Commissioner Jim Hightower makes out a case to explain how "technology happens". He writes: "Take cars. After Henry Ford began mass production, it took only a flash in time for these four-wheeled chunks of technology to wholly transform our landscape, environment, economy, culture, psychology, and ... well, pretty much our whole world. For better or worse, cars created freeways, shopping malls, McDonald's, drive-in banking – even the Beach Boys!" Hightower argues: "A new wave of technology is sweeping the land. It is embodied in the tiny chips (and the computers they power) that are radically and rapidly transforming our world – and, like the automobile, not always for the better."

He also contends that the story of the "dark side of the chip" needs to be "told and retold" across the "global village" before it is too late to do anything about it.

The book narrates the story of how the high-tech industry grew in the "Valley of Heart's Delight" (before the place got renamed to Silicon Valley) and how Santa Clara Valley fruit-processing workers such as Alida Hernandez got reinvented into "clean room" workers. This "deplorable pattern is still being replicated around the world".

== Stories of electronic workers suffering toxic exposures ==
The book contains stories about electronic workers suffering toxic exposures and fighting over it. From the Southwestern US and the Maquiladora region on the Mexico–United States border, to Malaysia, Taiwan, Thailand, China, and India.

The book argues that "far too (words) have been addressed to the downside of the (electronics industry's) revolution". Its co-editors, in a signed article titled "The Quest for Sustainability and Justice in a High-Tech World", say: "Although most consumers are eager to enjoy their latest electronic games, few relate the declining prices of these and other electronic technologies to the labor of Third World women, who are paid pennies a day."

Other issues focused on by the co-editors include environmental degradation, occupational health hazards, and the "widespread ignorance" of the "health and ecological footprints of the global electronics industry".

There are problems of contamination by hi-tech manufacturing (of workers, air, land and water) from all around—Silicon Valley in the United States, Silicon Glen in Scotland, Silicon Island in Thailand, and Silicon Paddy in China. It contrasts the reality between the "CEOs and upper management" drawing "multimillion dollar salaries and 'golden parachutes'" as against the reality of the production workers living in packed dormitories and often facing sweatshop conditions.

== Unsung heroines and heroes ==
While acknowledging the work of the hi-tech revolution pioneers, the book's editors also point to the "accomplishments of the unsung heroines and heroes of this revolution's other side". Including Santa Clara Center for Occupational Safety and Health founder Amanda Hawes; San Jose, California housewife Lorraine Ross, who battled against Fairchild Semiconductor Corporation's polluting practices in Silicon Valley; Thai occupational health physician Orapan Metadilogkul who confronted Seagate Corporation; and Scottish semiconductor worker Helen Clark "who gave her life fighting to provide a voice for poisoned workers of National Semiconductor's plant in Silicon Glen".

== Globalisation of electronics, labor rights, product end-of-life ==
Its editors say the book has "two geographical frames of reference"—the vicinity of San Jose, California (or, Silicon Valley), and "parts of the world increasingly integrated into global networks of electronics production, consumption, and disposal". The volume looks at three "broad, integrative themes": the globalization of electronics manufacturing; labor rights and environmental justice; and the product end-of-life cycle issues (e-waste, and extended producer responsibility).

In terms of global electronics, the book focuses on Silicon Valley (where the United States electronics industry's roots lie, and which has a three-decade history of community and worker dialog and struggle). It also looks at electronics manufacturing in China, India, Thailand, and Central and Eastern Europe.

In terms of labor rights and "environmental justice", the book looks at the stories of workers and environmentalists taking up such issues -- "work hazards, antiunion hostility, and environmental health perils"—in countries that range from the United States, to Mexico, Scotland, and Thailand, among others.

E-waste issues get looked at in the context of trading or dumping from the North to South. "But as nations like India and China increasingly modernize, their own industries and consumers are contributing to the problems as well," says the editors.

== Failed to keep pace with social and environmental advances ==
They argue that while the electronics industry leaders have produced "enormous technical innovation over the years", they have failed to keep "sufficient pace with the socially and environmentally oriented advances that are available to them." In their chapter titled "The Quest for Sustainability", the co-editors suggest that sustainability, environmental justice and labor rights "cannot lie solely in the hands of either the social movements or the captains of industry or the representatives of the state". Instead, it suggests, all citizens and stakeholders must play a role in shaping the industry, its workers, and the environment wherever communities get affected.

== "Downside not addressed" ==
Says an introduction to its contents: "Of the millions of words written over the past several decades about the electronics industry's incredible transformation of our world, far too few have been addressed (to) the downside of this revolution. Many are surprised to learn that environmental degradation and occupational health hazards are as much a part of high-tech manufacturing as miniaturization and other such marvels".

== Third World women's labor, pollute surroundings ==
The editors also comment: "Although most consumers are eager to enjoy their latest computers, televisions, cellular phones, iPods, and electronic games, few relate the declining prices of these and other electronic technologies to the labor of Third World women, who are paid pennies a day. Fewer still realize that the amazingly powerful microprocessors and superminiaturized, high-capacity memory devices harm the workers who produce them and pollute the surrounding communities' air and water".

== Comments on the book ==
Sandra Steingraber calls this book "essential reading for anyone who owns a cell phone or a computer" and says "our digital possessions connect us not only to global information but also to global contamination and injustice". Nicholas Ashford calls the work "an impressive, comprehensive critique and hopeful, but realistic, blueprint for transforming the global electronics industry into a sustainable one encompassing technological advance, environmental improvement, and equitable, safe, and secure employment". Jan Mazurek says that "contrary to high tech's clean image, this pioneering work illustrates the industry's environmental and economic downsides from the birthplace of Silicon Valley to the four corners of the globe to which the industry recently has spread". Mazurek comments that this book is "told from the compelling and passionate perspective of workers and activists involved in these struggles".

== Regions covered ==
Chapters of the book cover "Made in China" electronics workers, Thailand's electronic sector's corporate social responsibility, electronic workers in India, workers in and around Central and Eastern Europe's semiconductor plants (Russia, Belarus, Slovakia, Czech Republic, Poland and Romania), Silicon Valley's Toxics' Coalition and workers' struggles, Mexico, Taiwan's Hsinchu Science Park, other issues from Taiwan, high-tech pollution in Japan, the electronic waste trade, e-waste in Delhi, producer responsibility laws in Sweden and Japan, among other themes.

== See also ==
- List of environmental books
