= Eugene Saenger =

Eugene Saenger (March 5, 1917 – September 30, 2007) was an American university professor and physician. A graduate of Harvard University, Saenger was an extremely controversial pioneer in radiation research and nuclear medicine, at the expense of human autonomy and dignity. He taught at the University of Cincinnati for more than thirty years.

== Cincinnati Radiation Experiments (1960-1971) ==
From 1960 until 1971, Saenger, a radiologist at the University of Cincinnati, led an experiment exposing 88 cancer patients, mostly poor and 60% of whom were black, to whole body radiation, even though this sort of treatment had already been discredited by other researchers for the types of cancer these patients had. They were not told the Pentagon funded the study, however, according to The New York Times '...In the first five years, the researchers said, they obtained oral consent, and later various written consent forms.' They were told they would be getting an experimental treatment that might help them. Patients were exposed, in the period of one hour, to the equivalent of about 20,000 x-rays worth of radiation. This resulted in nausea, vomiting, severe stomach pain, loss of appetite, and mental confusion. Within the first month, 21 patients died. A report in 1972 indicated that some of the patients died of radiation poisoning, but some of the deaths might have been due simply to the late-stage cancer they already had when experimented on. Saenger received a gold medal for "career achievements" from the Radiological Society of North America. In 1994, the families of the patients sued Saenger, the University of Cincinnati, and the federal government. In 1999, the families won a $3.6 million settlement.

== See also ==
- Human experimentation in the United States
