= Paul Roberts (author) =

American journalist and author

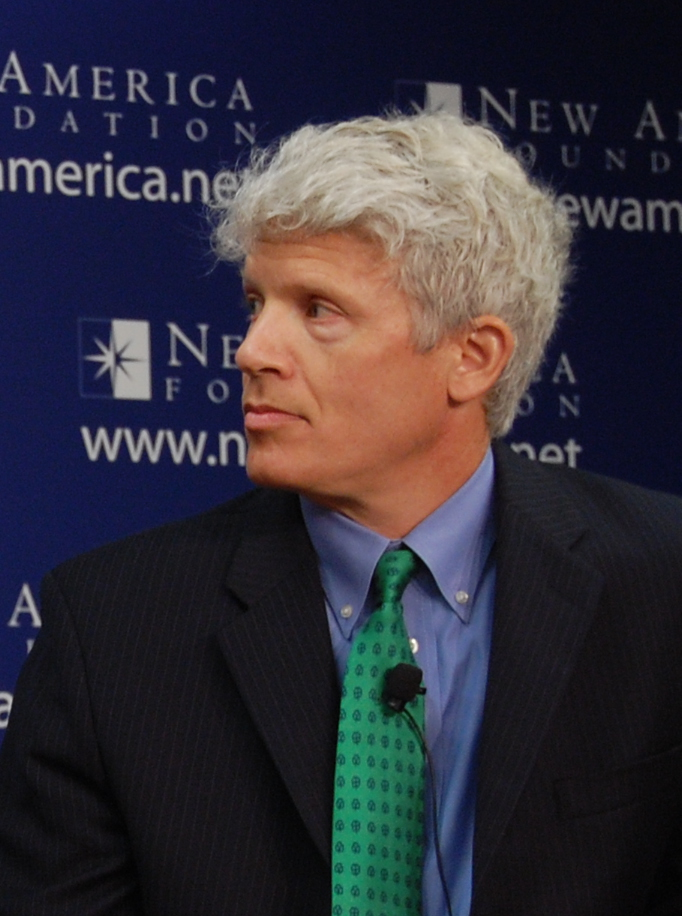
Roberts in 2011

Paul Roberts is an American journalist and author of three non-fiction books, including The End of Oil (2004) and The End of Food (2008). He had before been a regular contributor to Harper's Magazine and writes primarily about "the complex interplay of economics, technology, and the natural world."

== Books ==
=== The End of Oil (2004) ===
In his book-length debut, The End of Oil, Roberts gave an analysis of the various problems associated with humanity's reliance on oil and other fossil fuels such as coal and natural gas. The book received a number of positive reviews from American newspapers and review publications. Notably, environmentalist Bill McKibben, in an article for The New York Review of Books, described it as "perhaps the best single book ever produced about our energy economy and its environmental implications."

=== The End of Food (2008) ===
In 2008, Roberts published his second book, titled The End of Food. It is similar in fashion to The End of Oil in that Roberts attempts a comprehensive analysis of food production with its intricacies and weaknesses. As a theme, Roberts asks whether modern agriculture, as it has emerged since the Green Revolution, will be able to feed a growing world population. The End of Food was described by Michael Pollan, a professor of science and environmental journalism at the University of California and himself an author of food-related non-fiction, as "the best analysis of the global food economy you are likely to find."

=== The Impulse Society: America in the Age of Instant Gratification (2014) ===
In 2014, Roberts published his third book, titled The Impulse Society: America in the Age of Instant Gratification. The book was described by Elizabeth Gilbert as “tracing the country's many, disparate ills to the same source: as a nation, we've abandoned the common good. His analysis is smart, provocative, and timely. The Impulse Society compels us to reexamine what it is that we really want."

== Personal life ==
Roberts lives in Washington State.

== Bibliography ==
- Editions of The End of Oil

- Roberts, Paul (2004). The End of Oil. On the Edge of a Perilous New World. Boston: Houghton Mifflin. ISBN 978-0-618-23977-1.
- Roberts, Paul (2005). The End of Oil. On the Edge of a Perilous New World. With a new afterword. Boston: Mariner Books. ISBN 978-0-618-56211-4.
- Roberts, Paul (2005). The End of Oil. The Decline of the Petroleum Economy and the Rise of a New Energy Order. London: Bloomsbury Publishing. ISBN 978-0-7475-7081-3.

- Roberts, Paul (2008). The End of Food. Boston: Houghton Mifflin. ISBN 978-0-618-60623-8.
- Roberts, Paul (2014). The Impulse Society: America in the Age of Instant Gratification. London: Bloomsbury. ISBN 978-1-608-19814-6.
