= Hale Observatories =

The Hale Observatories are observatories set up by George Ellery Hale, including:

- Mount Wilson Observatory, in Los Angeles County, California
- Palomar Observatory, in San Diego County, California
- Yerkes Observatory, in Williams Bay, Wisconsin

== See also ==
- Hale Solar Laboratory, in Pasadena, California
