= Wintergreen (book) =

Book on logging

- Title page for Wintergreen (1987 original, 2001 pictured edition)
- Author: Robert Michael Pyle
- Language: English
- Genre: Non-fiction
- Publication date: 1987

Wintergreen, written in 1987, is a book by Robert Michael Pyle. It describes the devastation caused by unrestrained logging in Washington's Willapa Hills. It was also the winner of the John Burroughs Medal for Distinguished Nature Writing.
