= Ted Smith (environmentalist) =

American environmentalist

Ted Smith (born July 15, 1945) is the founder and former executive director of the Silicon Valley Toxics Coalition, co-founder of the International Campaign for Responsible Technology, and chair of the Electronics TakeBack Coalition steering committee.

Smith is a former VISTA Volunteer, a 1967 graduate of Wesleyan University, and a 1972 graduate of Stanford Law School.

In 2001, Smith was recognized by the Dalai Lama for his environmental leadership and in 2006 he co-edited the book, Challenging the Chip: Labor Rights and Environmental Justice in the Global Electronics Industry.
