= David A. Sonnenfeld =

American sociologist and professor (born 1953)

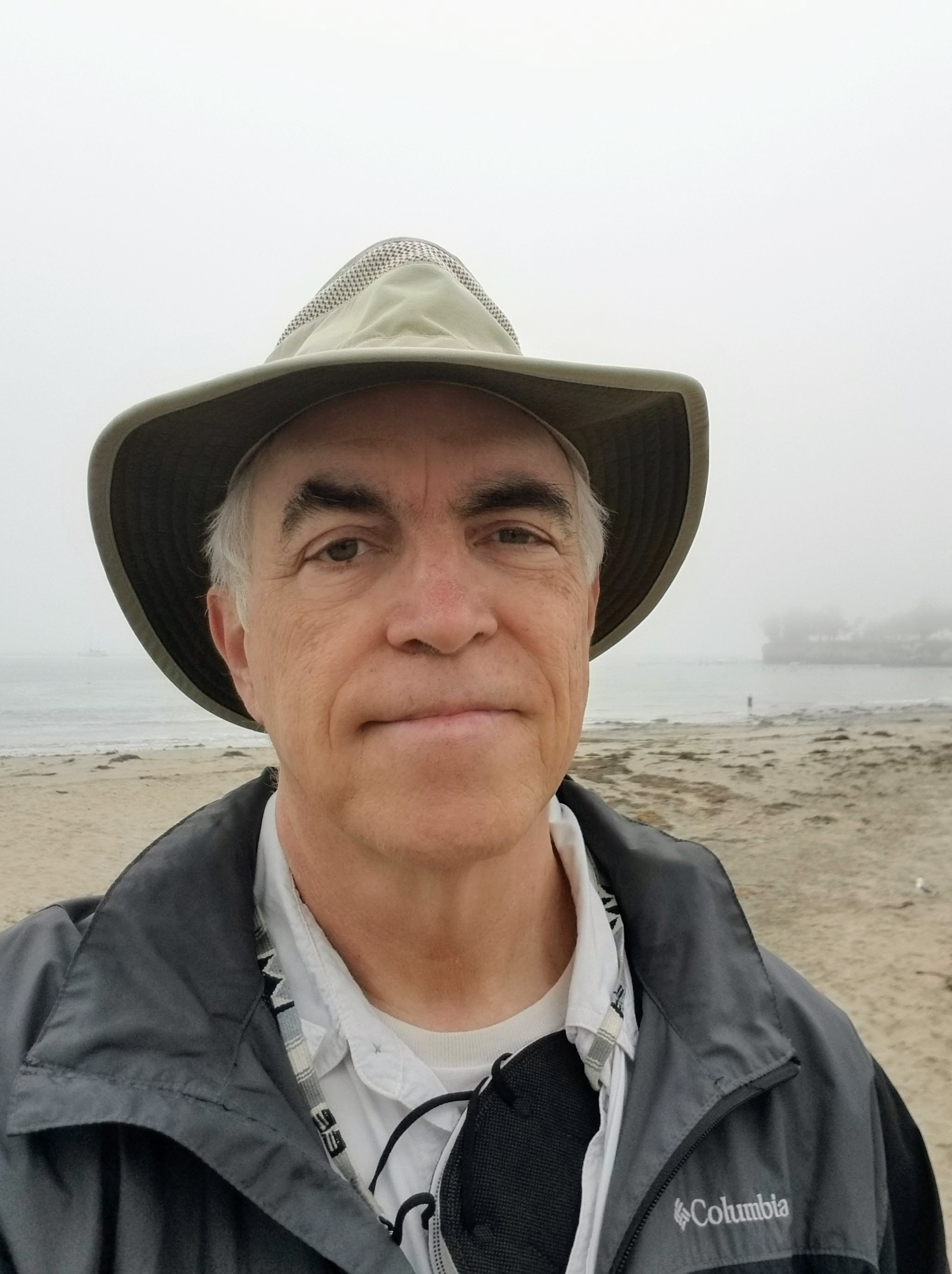
- Sonnenfeld in 2022.
- Born: July 31, 1953 (age 73)
- Education: UC Santa Cruz; University of Oregon
- Scientific career
- Fields: Sociology; Environmental policy Environmental sociology Ecological modernisation
- Workplaces: SUNY ESF; Syracuse University; Washington State University
- Thesis: Greening the Tiger?: Social Movements' Influence on Adoption of Environmental Technologies in the Pulp and Paper Industries of Australia, Indonesia, and Thailand (1996)

David Allan Sonnenfeld (born July 31, 1953) is an American sociologist and Professor Emeritus of Sociology and environmental policy at the State University of New York College of Environmental Science and Forestry, known for his work in the field of ecological modernisation.

== Biography ==
Sonnenfeld was born to Joseph Sonnenfeld (1929–2014), professor of geography at the Texas A&M University. Sonnenfeld obtained his undergraduate degree from the Robert D. Clark Honors College at the University of Oregon in 1973 and his Ph.D. in sociology in 1996 from the University of California, Santa Cruz, where his graduate studies focused on environmental social science, the sociology of development (Southeast Asia), and historical and field research methods.

Sonnenfeld started his academic career as assistant professor of sociology at Washington State University. He is also a research associate and periodic guest professor with the Environmental Policy Group at Wageningen University and Research Centre.

In September 2007 he joined the State University of New York College of Environmental Science and Forestry, where he was appointed professor and chair of environmental studies. He is co-editor of Ecological Modernisation Around the World: Perspectives and Critical Debates. In 2006, he co-edited the book Challenging the Chip. He was also a senior research associate at the Program for the Advancement of Research on Conflict and Collaboration in the Maxwell School of Citizenship and Public Affairs of Syracuse University. Sonnenfeld retired in September 2022.

== Work ==
Forest policy issues led to pursuits in the late 1980s, providing further impetus for forest-industry related research. As an Intercampus Exchange Student at the University of California, Berkeley in 1991, Sonnenfeld joined a network of scholars studying Indonesian forestry issues, beginning his foray into the study of social and environmental transformation in Southeast Asia and elsewhere.

In 1993-94, he was a visiting research fellow at the Centre for Resource and Environmental Studies at the Australian National University, from where he based his field research on the adoption of environmental technologies in the pulp and paper industries of Australia, Indonesia, Malaysia, and Thailand.

== Selected publications ==
- Peter Oosterveer; Sonnenfeld, David Allan (2012). Food, Globalization and Sustainability. London and New York: Earthscan/Routledge. ISBN 978-1-84971-260-6.
- Arthur P. J. Mol; Sonnenfeld, David Allan; Spaargaren, Gert (2009). The Ecological Modernisation Reader: Environmental Reform in Theory and Practice. New York: Routledge. ISBN 978-0-415-45370-7.
- Smith, Ted J.; Sonnenfeld, David Allan; Pellow, David N. (2006). Challenging the Chip: Labor Rights and Environmental Justice in the Global Electronics Industry. Philadelphia: Temple University Press. ISBN 1-59213-330-4.
- Mol, A. P. J.; Sonnenfeld, David Allan (2000). Ecological modernisation around the world: perspectives and critical debates. London: Frank Cass. ISBN 0-7146-8113-X.
- Arthur P. J. Mol; Sonnenfeld, David Allan; Spaargaren, Gert (2009). The Ecological Modernisation Reader: Environmental Reform in Theory and Practice. New York: Routledge. ISBN 978-0-415-45370-7.
- Sonnenfeld, David A. (1996). Greening the Tiger? Social Movements' Influence on Adoption of Environmental Technologies in the Pulp and Paper Industries of Australia, Indonesia, and Thailand. Santa Cruz: University of California.
