= Carl Pope (environmentalist) =

Former Sierra Club executive

Carl Pope is the former executive director of the Sierra Club, an American environmental organization founded by conservationist John Muir in 1892. Pope was appointed to his position as executive director in 1992, and served until January 20, 2010, when he was succeeded by Michael Brune. Pope then served as chairman of the Sierra Club until stepping down from that position in November 2011. He has served as the senior climate advisor to former New York City Mayor and 2020 presidential candidate Michael Bloomberg since 2017.

Pope had worked with the Sierra Club for more than 30 years, and has served as a board member for other organizations, including the National Clean Air Coalition, California Common Cause, and Public Interest Economics Inc. He has served as Political Director for Zero Population Growth. He was a Peace Corps volunteer in India from 1967 to 1969.

In 2008, Pope expressed support for the Pickens Plan, an effort by T. Boone Pickens to reduce America's dependence on foreign oil. Pickens, a billionaire oil investor, Republican, and financier of conservative causes, took Pope to his ranch in west Texas, where Pickens and a group of investors plan to invest $12 billion in wind turbines.

He graduated from Harvard College in 1967.

== Bibliography ==
Pope's first book, Sahib: An American Misadventure in India, was published by Liveright in 1972.

In 2004 he published a book with Paul Rauber called Strategic Ignorance: Why the Bush Administration Is Recklessly Destroying a Century of Environmental Progress.

On April 18, 2017, Pope published a book with Michael Bloomberg on titled Climate of Hope: How Cities, Businesses, and Citizens Can Save the Planet. He appeared on The Daily Show with Trevor Noah with Bloomberg on May 3 to promote the book.
