= List of environmental books =

Humans have been writing about the environment for centuries, and the environment has figured prominently as a theme in both Western and Eastern philosophies. Books about or featuring the environment as a prominent theme have proliferated especially since the middle of the twentieth century. The rise of environmental science, which has encouraged interdisciplinary approaches to studying the environment, and the environmental movement, which has increased public and political awareness of humanity's impact on the environment, have been highly influential. The 1962 publication of Rachel Carson's Silent Spring has been regarded as particularly important in popularizing environmental science and helping to launch the modern environmental movement. The emergence of the environmental humanities, including fields like environmental history, has also been important in bridging divides between the sciences and humanities and encouraging further interdisciplinary approaches. The environment also features prominently in much fictional literature.

This page is a list of environmental books. In this context they are notable books that feature the environment as a major theme, including human impacts on the environment.

== Non-fiction environmental books ==
Non-fiction accounts are ones that are presented as factual, although often in the context of subjective argument. Non-fiction environmental books may, for example, be the products of scholarly or journalistic work. The books in this list include fields and styles such as anthropology, conservation science, ecology, environmental history, lifestyle, and memoirs.

| Title | Author(s) | Year | Theme(s) and subtheme(s) | ISBN(s) |
|---|---|---|---|---|
| 1491: New Revelations of the Americas Before Columbus | Charles C. Mann | 2005 | Indigenous population and land use | ISBN 978-1-4000-4006-3 |
| 1493: Uncovering the New World Columbus Created | Charles C. Mann | 2011 | Ecological imperialism | ISBN 978-0-307-26572-2 |
| A Geography of Blood: Unearthing Memory from a Prairie Landscape | Candace Savage | 2012 | Landscape history | ISBN 9781553652342 |
| A Science on the Scales: The Rise of Canadian Atlantic Fisheries Biology, 1898-1939 | Jennifer Hubbard | 2006 | Fisheries management | ISBN 9780802088598 |
| A Temperate Empire: Making Climate Change in Early America | Anya Zilberstein | 2016 | Climate change; colonialism | ISBN 9780190206598 |
| Abundance: The Future Is Better Than You Think | Peter Diamandis and Steven Kotler | 2012 | Various themes | ISBN 978-1-4516-1421-3 |
| Agricultural Involution: The Processes of Ecological Change in Indonesia | Clifford Geertz | 1963 | Agriculture; Indonesia | ISBN 9780520004597 |
| All the Fish in the Sea: Maximum Sustainable Yield and the Failure of Fisheries Management | Carmel Finley | 2006 | Fisheries management; conservation | ISBN 978-0226249667 |
| All We Can Save | Ayana Elizabeth Johnson and Katharine Wilkinson (eds.) | 2020 | Essays, poetry | ISBN 978-0-593-23706-9 |
| Alternative Energy: Political, Economic, and Social Feasibility | Christopher A. Simon | 2006 | Energy | ISBN 0-7425-4908-9 ISBN 978-0-7425-4908-1 ISBN 0-7425-4909-7 ISBN 978-0-7425-4909-8 |
| Animal, Vegetable, Miracle | Barbara Kingsolver | 2007 | Local food | ISBN 978-0-06-085255-9 |
| AP 42 Compilation of Air Pollutant Emission Factors | | 1968 | Pollution: air pollution | |
| An Appeal to Reason: A Cool Look at Global Warming | Nigel Lawson | 2008 | Global warming | ISBN 978-0-7156-3786-9 ISBN 978-1-59020-084-1 |
| Aqueous Wastes from Petroleum and Petrochemical Plants | Milton R. Beychok | 1967 | Waste: oil refinery and petrochemical wastewaters | |
| Atlas of Our Changing Environment | United Nations Environment Programme | 2005 | Climate change | |
| Awful Splendour: A Fire History of Canada | Stephen J. Pyne | 2007 | Wildfires; Canada | ISBN 9780774840279 |
| Babylon's Ark, The Incredible Wartime Rescue of the Baghdad Zoo | Lawrence Anthony and Graham Spence | 2007 | Wildlife conservation | ISBN 9781429981439 |
| Beyond the Limits | Donella Meadows, Dennis Meadows, Jorgen Randers | 1992 | Population | ISBN 0-930031-62-8 |
| Beyond Oil: The View from Hubbert's Peak | Kenneth S. Deffeyes | 2006 | Energy | ISBN 9780374707026 |
| Big Coal: The Dirty Secret Behind America's Energy Future | Jeff Goodell | 2006 | Pollution | ISBN 978-0-618-87224-4 |
| A Big Fix: Radical Solutions for Australia's Environmental Crisis | Ian Lowe | 2005 | Various themes | ISBN 9781863951265 |
| Biohazard: The Chilling True Story of the Largest Covert Biological Weapons Program in the World - Told from Inside by the Man Who Ran It | Ken Alibek | 1999 | Biological weapons | ISBN 0-385-33496-6 |
| Black Faces, White Spaces | Carolyn Finney | 2014 | Environmental justice; racism | ISBN 978-1-4696-1448-9 |
| Blessed Unrest: How the Largest Movement in the World Came into Being and Why No One Saw It Coming | Paul Hawken | 2007 | Environmentalism | ISBN 978-0-670-03852-7 |
| The Blue Economy | Gunter Pauli | 2010 | Technology: biomimetics | ISBN 978-0-912111-90-2 |
| A Blueprint for Survival | Edward Goldsmith and Robert Allen | 1972 | Survival | ISBN 978-0-14-052295-2 |
| Borderlands/La Frontera: The New Mestiza | Gloria Anzaldúa | 1987 | Chicanx theory; borderlands | ISBN 978-1-879960-12-1 |
| Braiding Sweetgrass: Indigenous Wisdom, Scientific Knowledge, and the Teachings of Plants | Robin Wall Kimmerer | 2013 | Botany, Indigenous knowledge | ISBN 978-1-57131-335-5 |
| Bringing Whales Ashore: Oceans and the Environment of Early Modern Japan | Jakobina K. Arch | 2018 | Whaling; sustainability | ISBN 978-0-295-74329-5 |
| Brittle Power: Energy Strategy for National Security | Amory Lovins and L. Hunter Lovins | 1982 | Energy | ISBN 0-931790-28-X |
| Caliban and the Witch: Women, the Body and Primitive Accumulation | Silvia Federici | 2004 | Ecofeminism | ISBN 978-1-57027-059-8 |
| Canada's Deadly Secret: Saskatchewan Uranium and the Global Nuclear System | Jim Harding | 2007 | Uranium mining; nuclear power | ISBN 9781552662267 |
| The Carbon War: Global Warming and the End of the Oil Era | Jeremy Leggett | 1999 | Global warming | ISBN 9780415931021 |
| Catastrophe: Risk and Response | Richard Posner | 2004 | Various themes | ISBN 978-0-19-530647-7 |
| Challenging the Chip | Ted Smith, David A. Sonnenfeld, and David Naguib Pellow | 2006 | Waste: electronic waste | ISBN 1-59213-330-4 |
| Changes in the Land: Indians, Colonists and the Ecology of New England | William Cronon | 1983 | Land and water: hunting and fishing | ISBN 0-8090-0158-6 |
| The Chilling Stars | Henrik Svensmark and Nigel Calder | 2003 | Climate change: cosmic rays | ISBN 1-84046-815-7 |
| Cinderella of the New South: A History of the Cottonseed Industry, 1855-1955 | Lynette Boney Wrenn | 1995 | Agriculture | ISBN 9780870498824 |
| A Civil Action | Jonathan Harr | 1996 | Pollution: water pollution | ISBN 0-679-77267-7 |
| The Clean Tech Revolution: The Next Big Growth and Investment Opportunity | Ron Pernick and Clint Wilder | 2007 | Clean technology | ISBN 0-06-089623-X |
| Climate Capitalism: Capitalism in the Age of Climate Change | L. Hunter Lovins and Boyd Cohen | 2011 | Climate change; capitalism | ISBN 978-0-8090-3473-4 |
| Climate Change and Global Energy Security: Technology and Policy Options | Marilyn A. Brown and Benjamin K. Sovacool | 2011 | Climate change mitigation and global energy security | ISBN 978-0-262-01625-4 |
| Climate Change Denial: Heads in the Sand | Haydn Washington and John Cook; foreword by Naomi Oreskes | 2011 | Climate change denial | ISBN 978-1-84971-336-8 |
| Climate Code Red: The Case for Emergency Action | David Spratt and Philip Sutton | 2008 | Global warming | ISBN 1-921372-20-6 |
| Climate of Hope: How Cities, Businesses, and Citizens Can Save the Planet | Michael Bloomberg and Carl Pope | 2017 | Global warming and sustainable cities | ISBN 978-1-250-14207-8 |
| Climber's Paradise: Making Canada's Mountain National Parks, 1906-1974 | PearlAnn Reichwein | 2014 | environmental history, mountaineering, history of Canada, national parks | ISBN 978-0-88864-674-3 |
| The Coal Question | William Stanley Jevons | 1865 | Coal; peak coal | ISBN 978-0341876854 |
| Coal River: How a Few Brave Americans Took on a Powerful Company–and the Federal Government–to Save the Land They Love | Michael Shnayerson | 2008 | Mining: mountain removal mining | ISBN 9781429933162 |
| Collapse: How Societies Choose to Fail or Succeed | Jared Diamond | 2005 | Various themes | ISBN 0-14-303655-6 |
| The Colors of Nature | Alison H. Deming and Lauret E. Savoy | 2011 | Nature writing | ISBN 978-1-57131-319-5 |
| The Columbian Exchange | Alfred W. Crosby | 1972 | Columbian exchange | ISBN 978-0837172286 |
| The Coming Global Superstorm | Art Bell and Whitley Strieber | 1999 | Global warming | ISBN 0-671-04190-8 |
| Comprehensive Assessment of Water Management in Agriculture | International Water Management Institute and Earthscan | 2007 | Agriculture: agricultural hydrology | ISBN 978-1-84407-397-9 hardback |
| Confessions of an Eco-Warrior | Dave Foreman | 1991 | Earth First!; environmental activism | ISBN 9780451499455 |
| The Consumer's Guide to Effective Environmental Choices: Practical Advice from the Union of Concerned Scientists | Michael Brower and Warren Leon | 1999 | Consumerism | ISBN 0-609-80281-X |
| Contesting the Future of Nuclear Power: A Critical Global Assessment of Atomic Energy | Benjamin K. Sovacool | 2011 | Energy: nuclear energy | ISBN 978-981-4322-75-1 |
| A Contract with the Earth | Newt Gingrich and Terry L. Maple | 2007 | Environmental protection and restoration | ISBN 978-0-8018-8780-2 |
| The Control of Nature | John McPhee | 1989 | Geoengineering | ISBN 0-374-12890-1 |
| Cool It: The Skeptical Environmentalist's Guide to Global Warming | Bjørn Lomborg | 2007 | Global warming | ISBN 978-0-307-26692-7 |
| Cradle to Cradle: Remaking the Way We Make Things | Michael Braungart and William McDonough | 2002 | Sustainability; production | ISBN 0-86547-587-3 |
| Dammed: The Politics of Loss and Survival in Anishinaabe Territory | Brittany Luby | 2020 | Indigenous history; hydro power | ISBN 9780887558740 |
| The Death of Nature: Women, Ecology, and the Scientific Revolution | Carolyn Merchant | 1990 | Environmental history and history of science | ISBN 0-06-250595-5 |
| Wild by Design: The Rise of Ecological Restoration | Laura J. Martin | 2022 | History of science; ecological restoration | ISBN 9780674979420 |
| The Deniers: The world-renowned scientists who stood up against global warming hysteria, political persecution, and fraud | Lawrence Solomon | 2008 | Global warming: denial | ISBN 978-0-9800763-1-8 |
| Desert Solitaire: A Season in the Wilderness | Edward Abbey | 1968 | Memoir; conservation | ISBN 978-0-345-25021-6 |
| Diagnosis Mercury: Money, Politics and Poison | Jane Hightower | 2008 | Toxic waste | ISBN 978-1610910026 |
| The Dirty Energy Dilemma: What's Blocking Clean Power in the United States | Benjamin K. Sovacool | 2008 | Energy | ISBN 9780313355417 |
| The Discovery of Global Warming | Spencer R. Weart | 2003 | Global warming: history of scientific discoveries | ISBN 0-674-03189-X |
| Do Glaciers Listen? Local Knowledge, Colonial Encounters, and Social Imagination | Julie Cruikshank | 2014 | Anthropology; Indigenous History; Colonialism | ISBN 9780774811866 |
| Doughnut Economics: Seven Ways to Think Like a 21st-Century Economist | Kate Raworth | 2017 | Economics; Doughnut (economic model); sustainability | ISBN 9781603586740 |
| Dreamland: A Self-Help Manual for a Frightened Nation | Andri Snær Magnason | 2006 | Energy: hydropower | ISBN 978-0-9551363-2-0 |
| Eaarth: Making a Life on a Tough New Planet | Bill McKibben | 2010 | Climate change | ISBN 978-0-8050-9056-7 |
| Earth from the Air | Yann Arthus-Bertrand (photographer) | 2010 | Aerial landscape photography | ISBN 9780500515419 |
| Earth in the Balance: Ecology and the Human Spirit | Al Gore | 1992 | | ISBN 0-395-57821-3 ISBN 0-618-05664-5; ISBN 1-85383-743-1 ISBN 978-1-59486-637-1 |
| Eating Animals | Jonathan Safran Foer | 2009 | Food industry | ISBN 0-316-06990-6 |
| Ecodefense: A Field Guide To Monkeywrenching | Dave Foreman and Bill Haywood (editors) | 1985 | Activism; direct action | ISBN 9780963775108 |
| Ecological Imperialism: The Biological Expansion of Europe, 900-1900 | Alfred Crosby | 1986 | Ecological imperialism; introduced species: epidemics | ISBN 9781107394049 |
| Ecology: From Individuals to Ecosystems | Michael Begon, Colin R. Townsend, and John L. Harper | 2006 | Ecology | ISBN 978-1-4051-1117-1 |
| The Economical Environmentalist | Prashant Vaze | 2009 | Lifestyle | ISBN 9781849774604 |
| Ecotage! | Sam Love | 1972 | Activism; direct action | ISBN 0-671-78180-4 |
| Encounters at the Heart of the World | Elizabeth A. Fenn | 2014 | Environmental history | ISBN 978-0-374-71107-8 |
| Encounters with the Archdruid | John McPhee | 1971 | Environmentalism; David Brower | ISBN 0-374-51431-3 |
| The End of the Line: How Overfishing Is Changing the World and What We Eat | Charles Clover | 2004 | Overfishing | ISBN 0-09-189780-7 ISBN 1-59558-109-X ISBN 0-09-189781-5 ISBN 0-520-25505-4 |
| The End of Nature | Bill McKibben | 1989 | Global warming | ISBN 0-8129-7608-8 |
| The End of Oil: On the Edge of a Perilous New World | Paul Roberts (author) | 2004 | Energy | ISBN 978-0-618-23977-1 |
| Endemic Bird Areas of the World: Priorities for Biodiversity Conservation | Alison J. Stattersfield, Michael J. Crosby, Adrian J. Long, and David C. Wege | 1998 | Wildlife conservation | ISBN 0-946888-33-7 |
| Endgame (two volumes) | Derrick Jensen | 2006 | Anti-civilization | ISBN 1-58322-730-X ISBN 1-58322-724-5 |
| Energy and American Society: Thirteen Myths | Benjamin K. Sovacool and Marilyn A. Brown (editors) | 2007 | Energy | ISBN 978-1402055638 |
| Energy Autonomy: The Economic, Social & Technological Case for Renewable Energy | Hermann Scheer | 2006 | Energy | ISBN 1-84407-355-6 |
| Engines of Creation: The Coming Era of Nanotechnology | K. Eric Drexler | 1986 | Nanotechnology | ISBN 0-385-19973-2 |
| Entangled Life: How Fungi Make Our Worlds, Change Our Minds & Shape Our Futures | Merlin Sheldrake | 2020 | Mycology | ISBN 978-0-525-51031-4 |
| Entropy: A New World View | Jeremy Rifkin and Ted Howard | 1980 | Resource conservation | ISBN 0-670-29717-8 |
| Enviro-Capitalists: Doing Good While Doing Well | Terry Lee Anderson and Donald R. Leal | 1997 | Free-market environmentalism | ISBN 978-0-8476-8382-6 |
| Environmental Principles and Policies: An Interdisciplinary Introduction | Sharon Beder | 2006 | Various themes | ISBN 978-1-84407-404-4 |
| An Essay on the Principle of Population | Thomas Robert Malthus | 1798 | Population | ISBN 978-0486456089 |
| The Everglades: River of Grass | Marjory Stoneman Douglas | 1947 | Nature conservation | ISBN 978-1561649907 |
| Everybody Loves a Good Drought | P. Sainath | 1996 | Economics; development | ISBN 0-14-025984-8 |
| The Evolution of the Conservation Movement, 1850–1920 (collection of books and other publications) | | | Conservation movement | |
| Eyes Wide Open: Going Behind the Environmental Headlines | Paul Fleischman | 2014 | Various themes | ISBN 978-0-7636-7545-5 |
| Factor 5: Transforming the Global Economy through 80% Increase in Resource Productivity | Ernst Ulrich von Weizsäcker, et al. | 2009 | Resource efficiency | ISBN 978-0-8165-1086-3 |
| Fallout: An American Nuclear Tragedy | Philip L. Fradkin | 1989 | Radiation exposure; nuclear weapon tests | ISBN 978-0-8165-1086-3 |
| Famine 1975! America's Decision: Who Will Survive? | William Paddock, Paul Paddock | 1967 | Overpopulation: food security | |
| Farmageddon: The True Cost of Cheap Meat | Philip Lymbery, Isabel Oakeshott | 2014 | Factory farming; fish farming | ISBN 978-1-40884-644-5 |
| The Fate of the Earth | Jonathan Schell | 1982 | Nuclear disarmament | ISBN 9780394525594 |
| Fateful Harvest: The True Story of a Small Town, a Global Industry, and a Toxic Secret | Duff Wilson | 2001 | Waste: toxic waste recycled in fertilizer | ISBN 9780061873768 |
| Feral: Searching for enchantment on the frontiers of rewilding | George Monbiot | 2013 | Re-wilding | ISBN 978-1846147487 |
| Field Notes from a Catastrophe: Man, Nature, and Climate Change | Elizabeth Kolbert | 2006 | Climate change: causes and effects | ISBN 1-59691-125-5 |
| Flammable: Environmental Suffering in an Argentine Shantytown | Javier Auyero and Débora Swistun | 2008 | Environmental justice; pollution | ISBN 9789501245455 |
| Floating Coast: An Environmental History of the Bering Strait | Bathsheba Demuth | 2019 | Environmental history; Beringia | ISBN 0393635163 |
| Food Inc.: A Participant Guide: How Industrial Food Is Making Us Sicker, Fatter, and Poorer—And What You Can Do About It | | 2009 | Food industry | ISBN 978-1586486945 |
| The Frankenfood Myth: How Protest and Politics Threaten the Biotech Revolution | Henry I. Miller, Gregory Conko | 2004 | Agriculture: genetically modified food | ISBN 978-0275978792 |
| Free Market Environmentalism | Terry L. Anderson, Donald R. Leal | 2001 | Environmental economics | ISBN 9780312299736 |
| Fundamentals of Stack Gas Dispersion (4th edition) | Milton R. Beychok | 2005 | Air pollution; atmospheric dispersion modeling | ISBN 0-9644588-0-2 |
| The Gene Revolution: GM Crops and Unequal Development | Sakiko Fukuda-Parr | 2006 | Genetically modified organisms | ISBN 9781136553844 |
| The Ghost Map: The Story of London's Most Terrifying Epidemic - and How it Changed Science, Cities and the Modern World | Steven Berlin Johnson | 2006 | Pollution: water pollution | ISBN 1-59448-925-4 |
| The Global Interior: Mineral Frontiers and American Power | Megan Black | 2018 | Environmental history; U.S. imperialism | ISBN 978-0-674984-25-7 |
| Global Spin: The Corporate Assault on Environmentalism | Sharon Beder | 1997 | Anti-environmentalism and free-market environmentalism | ISBN 978-1-890132-12-5 |
| God is Red: A Native View of Religion | Vine Deloria Jr. | 1973 | Environmental degradation; anthropocentrism | ISBN 978-0-448-02168-3 |
| The God Species: Saving the Planet in the Age of Humans | Mark Lynas | 2011 | Various themes | ISBN 9781426208911 |
| The Great Barrier Reef: Biology, Environment and Management | Pat Hutchings, Mike Kingsford, Ove Hoegh-Guldberg | 2008 | Great Barrier Reef | ISBN 978-0-643-09557-1 |
| The Great Derangement: Climate Change and the Unthinkable | Amitav Ghosh | 2016 | Climate change | ISBN 9789386057433 |
| The Green Bible | | 2008 | Religion | ISBN 978-0-06-162799-6 |
| The Green Collar Economy: How One Solution Can Fix Our Two Biggest Problems | Van Jones | 2008 | Economics | ISBN 978-0-06-165075-8 |
| The Green Crusade | Charles T. Rubin | 1998 | Environmentalism | ISBN 0-8476-8817-8 |
| Green Illusions: The Dirty Secrets of Clean Energy and the Future of Environmentalism | Ozzie Zehner | 2012 | Consumerism and renewable energy | ISBN 978-0-8032-3775-9 |
| Green to Gold: How Smart Companies Use Environmental Strategy to Innovate, Create Value, and Build Competitive Advantage | Daniel C. Esty | 2006 | Business | ISBN 9780470393741 |
| Greenhouse Solutions with Sustainable Energy | Mark Diesendorf | 2007 | Energy | ISBN 978-0-86840-973-3 |
| Gusher of Lies: The Dangerous Delusions of Energy Independence | Robert Bryce | 2008 | Energy: renewable energy | ISBN 978-1-58648-321-0 |
| Half Gone: Oil, Gas, Hot Air and the Global Energy Crisis | Jeremy Leggett | 2005 | Energy | ISBN 978-1846270055 |
| Hard Choices: Climate Change in Canada | Harold Coward, Andrew J. Weaver | 2004 | Climate change: effects in Canada | ISBN 978-0-88920-442-3 |
| Harmony: A New Way of Looking at Our World | Charles, Prince of Wales, with Tony Juniper, Ian Skelly | 2010 | Climate change and agriculture | ISBN 0-06-173135-8 |
| Heaven and Earth: Global Warming — The Missing Science | Ian Plimer | 2009 | Global warming | ISBN 0-7043-7166-9 |
| Hell and High Water: Global Warming — the Solution and the Politics — and What We Should Do | Joseph J. Romm | 2006 | Global warming | ISBN 0-06-117212-X |
| High and Dry: John Howard, Climate Change and the Selling of Australia's Future | Guy Pearse | 2007 | Global warming | ISBN 9780670070633 |
| The Hockey Stick and the Climate Wars: Dispatches from the Front Lines | Michael E. Mann | 2012 | Climate change: hockey stick graph | ISBN 0-231-15254-X |
| Hot, Flat, and Crowded: Why We Need a Green Revolution—And How It Can Renew America | Thomas L. Friedman | 2008 | Sustainable development | ISBN 9780141918501 |
| How to Live a Low-Carbon Life: The Individual's Guide to Stopping Climate Change | Chris Goodall | 2007 | Consumerism | ISBN 978-1-84407-426-6 |
| Human Ecology, Human Economy: Ideas for an Ecologically Sustainable Future | Mark Diesendorf and Clive Hamilton | 1997 | Ecological economics | ISBN 9781864482881 |
| The Hundred Year Lie: How Food And Medicine Are Destroying Your Health | Randall Fitzgerald | 2006 | Food industry | ISBN 0-525-94951-8 |
| The Hype about Hydrogen: Fact and Fiction in the Race to Save the Climate | Joseph J. Romm | 2004 | Climate change | ISBN 1-55963-703-X ISBN 1-55963-704-8 |
| The Improving State of the World: Why We're Living Longer, Healthier, More Comfortable Lives On a Cleaner Planet | Indur M. Goklany | 2007 | Environmental skepticism | ISBN 1-930865-98-8 |
| An Inconvenient Truth: The Planetary Emergency of Global Warming and What We Can Do About It | Al Gore | 2006 | Global Warming | ISBN 1-59486-567-1 |
| An Introduction to Sustainable Development | Peter P. Rogers, with Kazi F. Jalal, John A. Boyd | 2007 | Sustainable development | ISBN 978-1-84407-521-8 |
| The Invention of Nature: Alexander von Humboldt's New World | Andrea Wulf | 2015 | History of ecology | ISBN 978-0385350662 |
| It's a Matter of Survival | Anita Gordon, David Suzuki | 1991 | Survival | ISBN 0-674-46970-4 |
| Kick The Fossil Fuel Habit: 10 Clean Technologies to Save Our World | Tom Rand | 2010 | Renewable energy: solar energy, wind power, geothermal energy, and more | ISBN 9780981295206 |
| Killer Company: James Hardie Exposed | Matt Peacock | 2009 | Asbestos in construction: fibrosis | ISBN 978-0-7333-2580-9 |
| Last Chance to See | Douglas Adams, Mark Carwardine | 1990 | Wildlife conservation | ISBN 9781409069751 |
| Last Child in the Woods: Saving Our Children From Nature-Deficit Disorder | Richard Louv | 2005 | Nature deficit disorder | ISBN 978-1-56512-605-3 |
| Latin American World Model | Amilcar Herrera, Hugo Scolnick, et al. | 1976 | Ecology Population | ISBN 0-88936-083-9 |
| The Lay of the Land: Metaphor As Experience and History in American Life and Letters | Annette Kolodny | 1984 | Ecofeminism | ISBN 978-0-8078-4118-1 |
| The Legacy of Luna | Julia Butterfly Hill | 2000 | Forest conservation | ISBN 0-06-251658-2 |
| Life in 2050 | Ulrich Eberl | 2011 | Various themes | ISBN 978-3-407-75357-1 |
| The Limits to Growth | Donella Meadows, Dennis Meadows, Jørgen Randers, William W. Behrens III | 1972 | Population; economic growth | ISBN 0-87663-165-0 |
| Living in the Hothouse: How Global Warming Affects Australia | Ian Lowe | 2005 | Climate change | ISBN 9781920769413 |
| The Living Soil | Lady Eve Balfour | 1943 | Organic farming | ISBN 9781904665083 |
| The Long Emergency: Surviving the Converging Catastrophes of the Twenty-first Century | James Howard Kunstler | 2005 | Various themes | ISBN 978-0-87113-888-0 |
| The Machine in Neptune's Garden: Historical Perspectives on Technology and the Marine Environment | Helen M. Rozwadowski, David K. van Keuren | 2004 | Ocean environment; envirotech | ISBN 0-88135-372-8 |
| Making Peace with the Planet | Barry Commoner | 1990 | Sustainable production | ISBN 978-0-394-56598-9 |
| Man and Nature | George Perkins Marsh | 1864 | Environmental degradation | ISBN 978-1298509253 |
| Managing Urban America | David R. Morgan, Robert E. England, John Peter Pelissero | 1979 | Urban planning | ISBN 1-56643-065-8 ISBN 1-56802-930-6 |
| Megaprojects and Risk: An Anatomy of Ambition | Bent Flyvbjerg, Nils Bruzelius, Werner Rothengatter | 2003 | Megaprojects | ISBN 0-521-80420-5 |
| Memory Lands: King Philip's War and the Place of Violence in the Northeast | Christine M. DeLucia | 2018 | Indigenous history | ISBN 9780300201178 |
| Merchants of Doubt: How a Handful of Scientists Obscured the Truth on Issues from Tobacco Smoke to Global Warming | Naomi Oreskes, Erik M. Conway | 2010 | Climate change denial; politics; lobbying | ISBN 978-1-59691-610-4 |
| Millennium: Tribal Wisdom and the Modern World | David Maybury-Lewis | 1992 | Tribal cultures and modernity (book companion to documentary series) | ISBN 978-0934245203 |
| Mira Lloyd Dock and the Progressive Era Conservation Movement | Susan Rimby | 2012 | Environmental History, Conservation, Progressive Era, Women's History | ISBN 978-0-271-05823-8 |
| The Moral Case for Fossil Fuels | Alex Epstein | 2014 | Energy: fossil fuels | ISBN 978-1-59184-744-1 |
| The Mushroom at the End of the World: On the Possibility of Life in Capitalist Ruins | Anna Tsing | 2015 | Ethnography; Matsutake | ISBN 9781400873548 |
| Natural Capitalism: Creating the Next Industrial Revolution | Paul Hawken, Amory Lovins, Hunter Lovins | 1999 | Ecosystem services: full-cost accounting | ISBN 978-0-316-35316-8 |
| A Nature Conservation Review (2 volumes) | Derek Ratcliffe | 1977 | Nature conservation | ISBN 0-521-21159-X |
| Nature, Place, and Story: Rethinking Historic Sites in Canada | Claire Elizabeth Campbell | 2017 | Historic sites; human and environmental history | ISBN 9780773551251 |
| The Navajo People and Uranium Mining | Doug Brugge, Timothy Benally, Esther Yazzie-Lewis | 2006 | Mining: uranium mining | ISBN 978-0-8263-3778-8 |
| The New Green Consumer Guide | Julia Hailes | 2007 | Consumerism | ISBN 978-0-7432-9530-7 |
| No One Is Too Small to Make a Difference | Greta Thunberg | 2019 | Global warming; climate crisis | ISBN 978-0-14-199174-0 |
| Non-Nuclear Futures: The Case for an Ethical Energy Strategy | Amory B. Lovins, John H. Price | 1975 | Energy | ISBN 0-88410-603-9 |
| Nourishing the Planet | | | Agriculture: sustainable agriculture | |
| The Omnivore's Dilemma: A Natural History of Four Meals | Michael Pollan | 2006 | Food industry | ISBN 978-1-59420-082-3 |
| Open Veins of Latin America: Five Centuries of the Pillage of a Continent | Eduardo Galeano | 1971 | Latin America; mining | ISBN 978-0853459903 |
| Operating Manual for Spaceship Earth | Buckminster Fuller | 1968 | Spaceship Earth; conservation | ISBN 978-3037781265 |
| Our Angry Earth: A Ticking Ecological Bomb | Isaac Asimov, Frederik Pohl | 1991 | Various themes | ISBN 0-312-85252-5 |
| Our Choice: A Plan to Solve the Climate Crisis | Al Gore | 2009 | Climate change | ISBN 9780747590989 |
| Our Plundered Planet | Henry Fairfield Osborn, Jr. | 1948 | Environmental degradation; soil | ISBN 9780316666084 |
| Our Posthuman Future: Consequences of the Biotechnology Revolution | Francis Fukuyama | 2002 | Biotechnology | ISBN 0-374-23643-7 ISBN 0-312-42171-0 |
| Our Stolen Future | Theo Colborn, Dianne Dumanoski, John Peterson Myers | 1996 | Endocrine disruptors | ISBN 978-0-525-93982-5 |
| Our Synthetic Environment | Murray Bookchin (pseudonym "Lewis Herber") | 1962 | Pesticides | ISBN 9781684222339 |
| Out of Control: The New Biology of Machines, Social Systems, and the Economic World | Kevin Kelly (editor) | 1994 | Various themes | ISBN 978-0-201-48340-6 |
| Out of Gas: The End of the Age of Oil | David Goodstein | 2004 | Energy | ISBN 0-393-05857-3 |
| The Oyster Question: Scientists, Watermen, and the Maryland Chesapeake Bay since 1880 | Christine Keiner | 2009 | Conservation | ISBN 978-0820326986 |
| The Party's Over: Oil, War, and the Fate of Industrial Societies | Richard Heinberg | 2003 | Energy | ISBN 0-86571-482-7 |
| The Pesticide Question: Environment, Economics and Ethics | David Pimentel (scientist), Hugh Lehman (editors) | 1993 | Pesticides | ISBN 978-0-412-03581-4 |
| Pilgrim at Tinker Creek | Annie Dillard | 1974 | Nature narrative | ISBN 978-0-7862-2325-1 |
| Plows, Plagues and Petroleum: How Humans Took Control of Climate | William Ruddiman | 2005 | Various themes | ISBN 9780691173214 |
| Plutopia: Nuclear Families, Atomic Cities, and the Great Soviet and American Plutonium Disasters | Kate Brown | 2013 | Environmental history; energy; nuclear power | ISBN 9780199855766 |
| Political Animals and Animal Politics | Marcel Wissenburg, David Schlosberg | 2014 | Animal welfare: animal ethics and environmental politics | ISBN 978-1-137-43461-6 |
| The Population Bomb | Paul R. Ehrlich | 1968 | Population | ISBN 1-56849-587-0 |
| Population Control: Real Costs, Illusory Benefits | Steven W. Mosher | 2008 | Population | ISBN 978-1-4128-0712-8 |
| Power Down: Options and Actions for a Post-Carbon World | Richard Heinberg | 2004 | Energy | ISBN 978-0-86571-510-3 |
| Power Hungry: The Myths of "Green" Energy and the Real Fuels of the Future | Robert Bryce | 2010 | Energy | ISBN 978-1-58648-789-8 |
| Power, Justice, and the Environment: A Critical Appraisal of the Environmental Justice Movement | David Pellow and Bob Brulle (eds) | 2005 | Environmental justice | ISBN 9780262162333 |
| Power, Profit and Protest: Australian Social Movements and Globalisation | Verity Burgmann | 2003 | Social movements; Australia | ISBN 9781741140163 |
| Primate Visions: Gender, Race, and Nature in the World of Modern Science | Donna Haraway | 1990 | History of science and biology | ISBN 9780415902946 |
| Prosperity Without Growth | Tim Jackson (economist) | 2009 | Environmental economics | ISBN 9781849713238 |
| Pumpkin: The Curious History of an American Icon | Cindy Ott | 2012 | Environmental history; Pumpkin | ISBN 9780295993324 |
| Putting biodiversity on the map: priority areas for global conservation | C. J. Bibby, et al. | 1992 | Biodiversity conservation | ISBN 0-946888-24-8 |
| Reaction Time: Climate Change and the Nuclear Option | Ian Lowe | 2007 | Various themes | ISBN 978-1-86395-412-9 |
| The Real Global Warming Disaster (Is The Obsession With 'Climate Change' Turning Out To Be the Most Costly Scientific Blunder In History?) | Christopher Booker | 2009 | Global warming | ISBN 1-4411-1052-6 |
| Red Sky at Morning: America and the Crisis of the Global Environment | James Gustave Speth | 2004 | Environmentalism | ISBN 0-300-10232-1 |
| Reflections in Bullough's Pond: Economy and Ecosystem in New England | Diana Muir | 2000 | Agriculture and fossil fuels | ISBN 0-87451-909-8 |
| Refuge: An Unnatural History of Family and Place | Terry Tempest Williams | 1991 | Various themes | ISBN 978-0-679-40516-0 |
| Renewable Electricity and the Grid: The Challenge of Variability | Godfrey Boyle | 2007 | Energy | ISBN 978-1-84407-418-1 |
| Requiem for a Species: Why We Resist the Truth about Climate Change | Clive Hamilton | 2010 | Climate change: climate change denial | ISBN 978-1-84971-081-7 |
| The Revenge of Gaia: Why the Earth is Fighting Back - and How we Can Still Save Humanity | James Lovelock | 2007 | Various themes | ISBN 0-14-102597-2 |
| Risk Governance: Coping with Uncertainty in a Complex World | Ortwin Renn | 2008 | Risk | ISBN 9781844072927 |
| River of Renewal: Myth and History in the Klamath Basin | Stephen Most | 2006 | Various themes | ISBN 9780295986227 |
| The Riverkeepers: Two Activists Fight to Reclaim Our Environment as a Basic Human Right | John Cronin (environmental author) and Robert F. Kennedy, Jr. (foreword by Al Gore) | 1997 | Pollution: water pollution | ISBN 0-684-83908-3 |
| Road to Survival | William Vogt | 1948 | anti-capitalist environmentalism | ISBN 0-548-38516-5 |
| The Sacred Balance | David Suzuki | 1997 | Various themes | ISBN 978-1-55054-548-7 |
| A Sand County Almanac | Aldo Leopold | 1949 | Nature conservation | ISBN 0-19-500777-8 |
| Science Under Siege: The Politicians' War on Nature and Truth | Todd Wilkinson | 1998 | Politics | ISBN 9781555662103 |
| Scorched: South Africa's Changing Climate | Leonie Joubert | 2007 | Climate change | ISBN 9781868144372 |
| Scorcher: The Dirty Politics of Climate Change | Clive Hamilton | 2007 | Climate change: Kyoto Protocol and Australian politics | ISBN 978-0-9775949-0-0 |
| The Sea Around Us | Rachel Carson | 1951 | Marine biology | ISBN 978-0195069976 |
| Secrets and Lies | Nicky Hager and Bob Burton | 1999 | Anti-environmentalism | ISBN 0-908802-57-9 |
| Selling Solar: The Diffusion of Renewable Energy in Emerging Markets | Damian Miller | 2009 | Energy | ISBN 9781849772518 |
| Sensing Changes: Technologies, Environments, and the Everyday, 1953-2003 | Joy Parr | 2010 | Environmental history; embodied history | ISBN 9780774859189 |
| Serpent River Resurgence: Confronting Uranium Mining at Elliot Lake | Lianne C. Leddy | 2022 | Environmental history; Indigenous history | ISBN 9781442614376 |
| The Shamba Raiders: Memories of a Game Warden | Bruce Kinloch | 1972 | Wildlife conservation | ISBN 978-0-00-261751-2 |
| Shaped by the West Wind: Nature and History in Georgian Bay | Claire Elizabeth Campbell | 2004 | environmental history, history of Canada | ISBN 9780774810982 |
| A Short History of Progress | Ronald Wright | 2004 | Environmental history | ISBN 0-88784-706-4 |
| Siberia, Siberia | Valentin Rasputin | 1991 | Environmental degradation | ISBN 978-0-8101-1575-0 ISBN 5-94535-067-2 |
| Silence of the Songbirds | Bridget Stutchbury | 2007 | Various themes | ISBN 978-0-8027-1609-5 |
| Silent Spring | Rachel Carson | 1962 | Pesticides; conservation | ISBN 9780618249060 |
| Silent Spring & other writings on environment | Rachel Carson | 2018 | Environmental science | ISBN 978-1-5985-3560-0 |
| Six Degrees: Our Future on a Hotter Planet | Mark Lynas | 2007 | Climate change | ISBN 978-0-00-720905-7 |
| The Sixth Extinction: An Unnatural History | Elizabeth Kolbert | 2014 | Extinction: human activities | ISBN 978-0-8050-9299-8 |
| The Skeptical Environmentalist: Measuring the Real State of the World | Bjørn Lomborg | 2001 | Various themes | ISBN 0-521-01068-3 |
| Small Is Beautiful: A Study of Economics As If People Mattered | E. F. Schumacher | 1973 | Various themes | ISBN 978-0-06-091630-5 |
| Small Is Profitable: The Hidden Economic Benefits of Making Electrical Resources the Right Size | Amory Lovins, et al. | 2002 | Economics | ISBN 9781881071075 |
| State of the World | Worldwatch Institute | 1984– (annual) | Global environmental challenges | Various (see article) |
| State of the World 2010: Transforming Cultures: From Consumerism to Sustainability | Erik Assadourian, et al. | 2010 | Sustainability and consumerism | ISBN 9781849710541 |
| States of Nature: Conserving Canada's Wildlife in the Twentieth Century | Tina Loo | 2006 | Environmental history; conservation; Canada | ISBN 978-0-77-481290-0 |
| Staying with the Trouble: Making Kin in the Chthulucene | Donna Haraway | 2016 | Environmental change; pollution | ISBN 978-0822362241 |
| Storm World: Hurricanes, Politics, and the Battle Over Global Warming | Chris Mooney | 2007 | Global warming | ISBN 978-0-15-101287-9 |
| Storms of My Grandchildren: The Truth About the Coming Climate Catastrophe and Our Last Chance to Save Humanity | James Hansen | 2009 | Climate change: fossil fuels | ISBN 978-1-60819-200-7 |
| Straight Up: America's Fiercest Climate Blogger Takes on the Status Quo Media, Politicians, and Clean Energy Solutions | Joseph J. Romm | 2010 | Various themes | ISBN 1-59726-716-3 |
| Struggle for the Land: Native North American Resistance to Genocide, Ecocide and Colonization | Ward Churchill | 1993 | Various themes | ISBN 0-87286-414-6 |
| Surviving the Century: Facing Climate Chaos and Other Global Challenges | Herbert Girardet (editor) | 2007 | Various themes | ISBN 9781136556159 |
| Taken By Storm: The Troubled Science, Policy and Politics of Global Warming | Christopher Essex and Ross McKitrick | 2002 | Global warming | ISBN 1-55263-212-1 |
| Tasmania's Wilderness Battles: A History | Greg Buckman | 2008 | Wilderness | ISBN 978-1-74175-464-3 |
| Ten Technologies to Save the Planet (first edition) or Ten Technologies to Fix Energy and Climate (second edition) | Chris Goodall | 2008 (1st ed.); 2009 (2nd ed.) | Various themes | ISBN 978-1-84668-868-3 |
| This Changes Everything: Capitalism vs. the Climate | Naomi Klein | 2014 | Climate change; economics | ISBN 978-1451697384 |
| This Fissured Land: An Ecological History of India | Madhav Gadgil and Ramachandra Guha | 1992 | Environmental history; use of natural resources in India | ISBN 978-0-19-807744-2 |
| A Thousand Barrels a Second: The Coming Oil Break Point and the Challenges Facing an Energy Dependent World | Peter Tertzakian | 2007 | Energy | ISBN 978-0-07-149260-7 |
| Toms River: A Story of Science and Salvation | Dan Fagin | 2013 | Pollution: cancer cluster | ISBN 978-0-553-80653-3 |
| Trading Up: Consumer and Environmental Regulation in a Global Economy | David Vogel | 1995 | Environmental regulation | ISBN 9780674044685 |
| Twisted: The Distorted Mathematics of Greenhouse Denial | Ian G. Enting | 2007 | Climate change: environmental skepticism | ISBN 978-0-646-48012-1 |
| The Ultimate Resource | Julian Lincoln Simon | 1981 | Resources | ISBN 0-691-00381-5 |
| Unbowed: A Memoir | Wangari Maathai | 2007 | Environmentalism | ISBN 9780307275202 |
| The Unfinished Twentieth Century | Jonathan Schell | 2001 | Energy: nuclear energy | ISBN 978-1-85984-780-0 |
| Unstoppable Global Warming: Every 1,500 Years | Siegfried Fred Singer and Dennis T. Avery | 2006 | Global warming: natural causes | ISBN 978-0-7425-5117-6 |
| The Upside of Down: Catastrophe, Creativity, and the Renewal of Civilization | Thomas Homer-Dixon | 2006 | Various themes | ISBN 978-0-676-97722-6 |
| Voices from the Gathering Storm: The Web of Ecological-Societal Crisis | Joseph C. Arcos, Mary F. Angus, and Frederick J. DiCarlo, eds. (18 contributors) | 2005 | Ecological and social crisis | ISBN 978-1-59571-101-4 |
| Walden | Henry David Thoreau | 1854 | Lifestyle | ISBN 978-0-345-80431-0 |
| Wave: Life and Memories after the Tsunami | Sonali Deraniyagala | 2013 | Natural disaster: 2004 Indian Ocean earthquake and tsunami | ISBN 978-0-345-80431-0 |
| The Weather Makers: The History and Future Impact of Climate Change | Tim Flannery | 2005 | Climate change | ISBN 1-920885-84-6 |
| The Weather of the Future: Heat Waves, Extreme Storms, and Other Scenes From a Climate-Changed Planet | Heidi Cullen | 2010 | Climate change | ISBN 978-0-06-172688-0 |
| Wet Prairie: People, Land, and Water in Agricultural Manitoba | Shannon Stunden Bower | 2011 | Agriculture, environmental history | ISBN 9780774818520 |
| When Corporations Rule the World | David Korten | 1995 | Anti-globalization; economics | ISBN 1-887208-00-3 |
| Whole Earth Discipline: An Ecopragmatist Manifesto | Stewart Brand | 2009 | Various themes | ISBN 978-0-670-02121-5 |
| Why We Disagree About Climate Change: Understanding Controversy, Inaction and Opportunity | Mike Hulme | 2009 | Climate change | ISBN 978-0-521-72732-7 |
| Wild Law: A Manifesto for Earth Justice | Cormac Cullinan | 2003 | Environmental justice | ISBN 0-9584417-8-2 ISBN 1-903998-35-2 |
| Wild Solutions: How Biodiversity is Money in the Bank | Andrew Beattie and Paul R. Ehrlich | 2001 | Biodiversity | ISBN 9780300127188 |
| Wildlife Wars: My Fight to Save Africa's Natural Treasures | Richard Leakey and Virginia Morell | 2001 | Wildlife conservation | ISBN 0-330-37240-8 |
| The Windward Road: Adventures of a Naturalist on Remote Caribbean Shores | Archie Carr | 1956 | Conservation: wildlife conservation | ISBN 978-0-8130-0639-0 |
| Winning the Oil Endgame: Innovation for Profits, Jobs and Security | Amory Lovins | 2005 | Energy | ISBN 978-1-84407-194-4 |
| Wintergreen | Robert Michael Pyle | 1987 | Logging | ISBN 978-0-395-46559-2 |
| The World Without Us | Alan Weisman | 2007 | De-population; the natural world | ISBN 0-312-34729-4 ISBN 978-0-312-34729-1 |
| Worms Eat My Garbage: How to Set Up & Maintain a Worm Composting System | Mary Arlene Appelhof | 1982 | Vermicomposting; waste management | ISBN 978-0-942256-10-9 |

== Fiction environmental books ==
Fiction environmental books feature the environment as a prominent theme. Books in this list include fields such as children's literature, eco-fiction, fantasy, and science fiction.

| Title | Author(s) | Year(s) | Theme(s) | ISBN(s) |
|---|---|---|---|---|
| American War | Omar El Akkad | 2017 | Climate change | ISBN 978-1-5098-5220-8 |
| Antarctica | Kim Stanley Robinson | 1997 | Nature conservation | ISBN 0-00-225359-3 |
| The Appeal | John Grisham | 2008 | Pollution: water pollution | ISBN 978-0-385-51504-7 |
| The Back of the Turtle | Thomas King | 2014 | Defoliants | ISBN 978-1-4434-3162-0 |
| Blockade | Derek Hansen | 1998 | Logging | ISBN 0-7322-6466-9 |
| Caballero: A Historical Novel | Jovita Gonzalez and Eve Raleigh | 1996 | borderlands | ISBN 978-0-89096-700-3 |
| The Caretaker Trilogy (series) | David Klass | 2006; 2008; 2009 | Nature conservation | ISBN 978-0-374-32307-3; ISBN 978-0-374-32308-0; ISBN 978-0-374-32309-7 |
| Carpentaria | Alexis Wright | 2006 | indigenous studies; Australia; settler colonialism | ISBN 978-1439157848 |
| Coal | Audre Lorde | 1976 | poetry collection | ISBN 978-0393044393 |
| The Cool War | Frederik Pohl | 1981 | Energy; fossil fuel depletion | ISBN 0-394-29383-5 |
| Drive Your Plow Over the Bones of the Dead | Olga Tokarczuk | 2009 | Animal welfare; hunting | ISBN 978-83-08-04398-1 |
| Earth Abides | George R. Stewart | 1949 | Disease and population | ISBN 9780345487131 |
| The Earthquake in Chile | Heinrich von Kleist | 1807 | Earthquakes | |
| Ecotopia: The Notebooks and Reports of William Weston | Ernest Callenbach | 1975 | Various themes | ISBN 0-553-34847-7 |
| Ecotopia Emerging | Ernest Callenbach | 1981 | Various themes | ISBN 0-9604320-3-5 |
| Flight Behavior | Barbara Kingsolver | 2012 | Climate change | ISBN 978-0-06-212427-2 |
| The Forgotten Enemy | Arthur C. Clarke | 1949 | Climate change | |
| Freedom | Jonathan Franzen | 2010 | Various themes | ISBN 0-374-15846-0 |
| A Friend of the Earth | T. Coraghessan Boyle | 2000 | Various themes | ISBN 0-670-89177-0 |
| The Green Brain | Frank Herbert | 1966 | Ecosystems: insects almost extinguished | OCLC 476046923 |
| Hoot | Carl Hiaasen | 2002 | Wildlife conservation | ISBN 0-330-41529-8 |
| The Hungry Tide | Amitav Ghosh | 2004 | South Asia; environmental transformation | ISBN 0-00-714178-5 |
| Ishmael | Daniel Quinn | 1992 | Human-animal relations; sustainability | ISBN 0-553-07875-5 |
| The Last Man | Mary Shelley | 1826 | Pandemic; global catastrophic risk | |
| The Lorax | Dr. Seuss | 1971 | Various themes | ISBN 0-394-82337-0 |
| MaddAddam | Margaret Atwood | 2013 | Climate change; ecological degradation | ISBN 0-77100-846-5 |
| Make Room! Make Room! | Harry Harrison | 1966 | Population | ISBN 978-0-7653-1885-5 |
| The Marrow Thieves | Cherie Dimaline | 2017 | indigenous studies; climate change | ISBN 978-1770864863 |
| The Mockery Bird | Gerald Durrell | 1981 | Symbiosis and Lazarus taxa | ISBN 978-0-671-44131-9 |
| The Monkey Wrench Gang | Edward Abbey | 1975 | Eco-terrorism | ISBN 0-397-01084-2 |
| Mother of Storms | John Barnes | 1994 | Climate change: giant hurricane caused by nuclear explosion | ISBN 0-312-85560-5 |
| Old MacDonald Had a Farm | Mike Resnick | 2001 | Genetically engineered animals | |
| Oryx and Crake | Margaret Atwood | 2003 | Climate change; ecological degradation | ISBN 0-7710-0868-6 |
| Parable of the Sower | Octavia Butler | 1993 | Ecological collapse; adaptation | ISBN 0-941423-99-9 |
| Parable of the Talents | Octavia Butler | 1998 | Ecological collapse; adaptation | ISBN 1-888363-81-9 |
| A Planet for the President | Alistair Beaton | 2004 | Various themes | ISBN 0-297-84776-7 |
| Plume | Kathleen Flenniken | 2012 | Poetry collection | ISBN 978-0-295-99153-5 |
| Process of Elimination | Carolyn Keene | 1998 | Mystery | ISBN 9780671007393 |
| Prodigal Summer | Barbara Kingsolver | 2000 | | ISBN 0-06-095903-7 |
| Rainforest | Jenny Diski | 1987 | | ISBN 978-0-413-15910-6 |
| Salvage the Bones | Jesmyn Ward | 2011 | Environmental justice | ISBN 978-1-60819-522-0 |
| So Far from God | Ana Castillo | 1993 | Environmental justice | ISBN 0-393-03490-9 |
| State of Fear | Michael Crichton | 2004 | Various themes | ISBN 0-00-718159-0 |
| Under the Feet of Jesus | Helena María Viramontes | 1995 | Environmental justice, Chicanx | ISBN 9780393326932 |
| The Winter Vault | Anne Michaels | 2009 | dams; inundated landscape; Egypt | ISBN 978-0747598091 |
| The Word for World Is Forest | Ursula K. Le Guin | 1972 | Colonialism | ISBN 0-399-11716-4 |
| The Year of the Flood | Margaret Atwood | 2009 | Climate change; ecological degradation | ISBN 978-0-7475-8516-9 |
| Zodiac | Neal Stephenson | 1988 | Toxic waste | ISBN 0-87113-181-1 |

== See also ==
- Bibliography of sustainability
- Climate change in literature
- Earth Policy Institute#Books
- Eco-terrorism in fiction
- Environmentalism in The Lord of the Rings
- List of American non-fiction environmental writers
- List of Australian environmental books
- List of books about energy issues
- List of books about nuclear issues
- List of books about renewable energy
- List of climate change books
- List of environmental issues
- List of environmental law reviews and journals
- List of environmental periodicals
- List of environmental reports
- List of environmental websites
- Lists of environmental publications
- Opposing Viewpoints series
- Risk#List of related books
