= List of non-fiction environmental writers =

Notable non-fiction environmental writers include:

== Other non-fiction environmental writers ==
Author	Sex	Lifespan	Nationality	Theme(s)	Selected book
Douglas Adams	M	1952–2001	English	Conservation movement	Great Ape Project (co-authored)
Günter Altner	M	1936–2011	German	Environmental ethics	
Ndyakira Amooti	M	1955 or 1956 – 1999	Ugandan	Conservation movement	
Lawrence Anthony	M	1950–2012	South African	Conservation movement	Babylon's Ark
Lady Eve Balfour	F	1899–1990	English	Organic movement	The Living Soil
Sharon Beder	F		Australian	Civil engineering	Global Spin: The Corporate Assault on Environmentalism
Tzeporah Berman	F	1969–	Canadian	Temperate rainforest: clearcutting	Clayoquot & Dissent
Christopher Booker	M	1937–2019	English	Various themes	The Real Global Warming Disaster
Michael Braungart	M	1958–	German	Industrial waste	
Harold Brookfield	M	1926–2022	British and Australian	Rural development, family farms	Cultivating Biodiversity: Understanding, Analysing and Using Agricultural Diversity
Hans Bruyninckx	M	1964–	Belgian	Environmental social science	
Verity Burgmann	F	1952–	Australian	Indigenous land rights	Power, Profit and Protest
Helen Caldicott	F	1938–	Australian	Anti-nuclear movement	
Mark Carwardine	M	1959–		Endangered species	Last Chance to See (co-authored)
Pratap Chatterjee	M			Various themes	
Cormac Cullinan	M			Environmental law	Wild Law
Mark Diesendorf	M		Australian	Sustainable energy	Greenhouse Solutions with Sustainable Energy
David Fig	M		South African	Various themes	Uranium Road: Questioning South Africa's Nuclear Direction
Tim Flannery	M	1956–	Australian	Climate change	The Weather Makers
Sakiko Fukuda-Parr	F		Japanese	Genetic engineering	The Gene Revolution: GM Crops and Unequal Development
Masanobu Fukuoka	M	1913–2008	Japanese	Natural farming	
John Gibbons	M		Irish	Climate change	
Paul Gilding	M		Australian	Various themes	
Herbert Girardet	M			Various themes	Surviving the Century: Facing Climate Chaos and Other Global Challenges
Chris Goodall	M	1955–	English	Various themes	Ten Technologies to Fix Energy and Climate
Uri Gordon	M	1976–	Israeli	Direct action	
Nicky Hager	M	1958	New Zealander	Various themes	Seeds of Distrust
Julia Hailes	F	1961–	English	Ethical consumerism	The New Green Consumer Guide
Clive Hamilton	M	1953–	Australian	Various themes	Requiem for a Species
John L. Harper	M	1925–2009	British	Population biology	Ecology: From Individuals to Ecosystems (co-authored)
Lisa Harrow	F	1943–		Sustainable living	What Can I Do?
Rizwana Hasan	F	1968–	Bangladeshi	Environmental law: ship breaking	Laws Regulating Environment in Bangladesh
Dieter Helm	M		British	Energy	The Carbon Crunch: How We're Getting Climate Change Wrong – and How to Fix it
Ove Hoegh-Guldberg (biologist)	M	1959–	Australian	Coral reefs	
Thomas Homer-Dixon	M	1956–	Canadian	Petroleum industry	The Upside of Down
Kenneth Hsu	M		Swiss	Various themes	Klima Macht Geschichte: Menschheitsgeschichte als Abbild der Klimaentwicklung
Mike Hulme	M	1960–	English	Climate change	Why We Disagree About Climate Change
Leonie Joubert	F		South African	Climate change	Scorched: South Africa's Changing Climate
Rahanna Alicia Juman	F		Trinidad and Tobago	Wetlands, Ecology	Wetlands of Trinidad & Tobago
Yoshikazu Kawaguchi	M	1939–2023	Japanese	Natural farming	
David Keith	M		Canadian	Climate change	A Case for Climate Engineering
Petra Kelly	F	1947–1992	German	Disarmament	
Bruce Kinloch	M	1919–2011	British	Wildlife conservation	The Shamba Raiders
Satish Kumar	M	1936–	Indian, English		
Nigel Lawson	M	1932–2023	British	Climate change	An Appeal to Reason
Richard Leakey	M	1944–2022	Kenyan	Conservation movement	Wildlife Wars: My Fight to Save Africa's Natural Treasures (co-authored)
Jeremy Leggett	M	1954–	English	Various themes	Half Gone: Oil, Gas, Hot Air and the Global Energy Crisis
Howard Liddell	M	1945–2013	British	Sustainable development and passive housing	Eco-minimalism – The Antidote to Eco-bling
Andre Lima	M	1971–	Brazilian	Various themes	Ecological-economic zoning of the Light Environmental Laws
Bjørn Lomborg	M	1965–	Danish	Various themes	The Skeptical Environmentalist
James Lovelock	M	1919–2022	English	Various themes	The Revenge of Gaia
Ian Lowe	M		Australian	Various themes	Reaction Time: Climate Change and the Nuclear Option
Philip Lymbery	M	1965–	British	Industrial agriculture	Farmageddon
Mark Lynas	M	1973–	British	Various themes	Six Degrees: Our Future on a Hotter Planet
Andri Snær Magnason	M	1973–	Icelandic	Hydroelectricity	Dreamland: A Self-Help Manual for a Frightened Nation
Thomas Robert Malthus	M	1766–1834	English	Population growth	An Essay on the Principle of Population
Samuel Mann	M		New Zealand	Sustainability	The Green Graduate: Educating Every Student as a Sustainable Practitioner
George Marshall	M	1964–	British	Climate change	Don't Even Think About It: Why Our Brains Are Wired to Ignore Climate Change
David Maybury-Lewis	M	1929–2007			Millennium: Tribal Wisdom and the Modern World
Alastair McIntosh	M	1955–	Scottish	Various themes	
Ian McKay	M	1962–	English		
Anupam Mishra	M	1948–2016	Indian	Water management	
George Monbiot	M	1963–	English	Climate change	
Andrew Montford	M		English	Climate change	The Hockey Stick Illusion
N. K. Sukumaran Nair	M	1942–2021	Indian	Pamba River	
Andrew Nikiforuk	M		Canadian		
Helena Norberg-Hodge	F			Sustainable living	Ancient Futures: Learning from Ladakh
Mark O'Connor	M	1945–	Australian	Various themes	
Guy Pearse	M		Australian	Climate change	High and Dry
Sharon Pincott	F		Australian	Conservation Movement	Elephant Dawn
Ian Plimer	M	1946–	Australian	Various themes	Heaven and Earth
Li Quan	F		Chinese	Tiger conservation	Rewilded, Saving the South China Tiger (bilingual, English and Chinese)
Jørgen Randers	M	1945–	Norwegian	Climate change	2052 - A Global Forecast for the Next Forty Years
Valentin Rasputin	M	1937–2015	Russian	Water management	
Derek Ratcliffe	M	1929–2005	British	Conservation movement	A Nature Conservation Review (2 volumes)
Emma Romeu	F		Cuban		
David Mayer de Rothschild	M	1978–	British	Various themes	
Palagummi Sainath	M	1957–	Indian	Various themes	
R. Murray Schafer	M	1933–2021	Canadian	Acoustic ecology	The Tuning of the World (The Soundscape), republished as The Soundscape
Hermann Scheer	M	1944–2010	German	Renewable energy	Energy Autonomy: The Economic, Social & Technological Case for Renewable Energy
E. F. Schumacher	M	1911–1977	British	Appropriate technology	Small Is Beautiful
Philip Sherrard	M	1922–1995	British	Religion and environmentalism	
Vandana Shiva	F	1952–	Indian	Various themes	
Stanislav Edward Shmelev	M		British	Ecological economics	Ecological Economics: Sustainability in Practice
Rick Smith	M	1968–	Canadian	Medical toxicology	Slow Death by Rubber Duck: How the Toxic Chemistry of Everyday Life Affects Our Health (co-authored)
Lawrence Solomon	M	1948–	Canadian	Various themes	The Deniers
David Suzuki	M	1936–	Canadian	Various themes	The Sacred Balance
Peter Tertzakian	M		Canadian	Energy industry	The End of Energy Obesity
Paranjoy Guha Thakurta	M	1955–	Indian	Energy in India	Gas Wars
Josef Velek	M	1939–1990	Czechoslovak, Czech		
Ernst Ulrich von Weizsäcker	M	1939–	German		
Sanjay Singh Yadav	M		Indian		The Environmental Crisis of Delhi
Lü Zhi	F	1965–	Chinese	Conservation of giant pandas and other species	Giant Pandas in the Wild

== See also ==
- List of environmental books
