= Damian Miller (solar entrepreneur) =

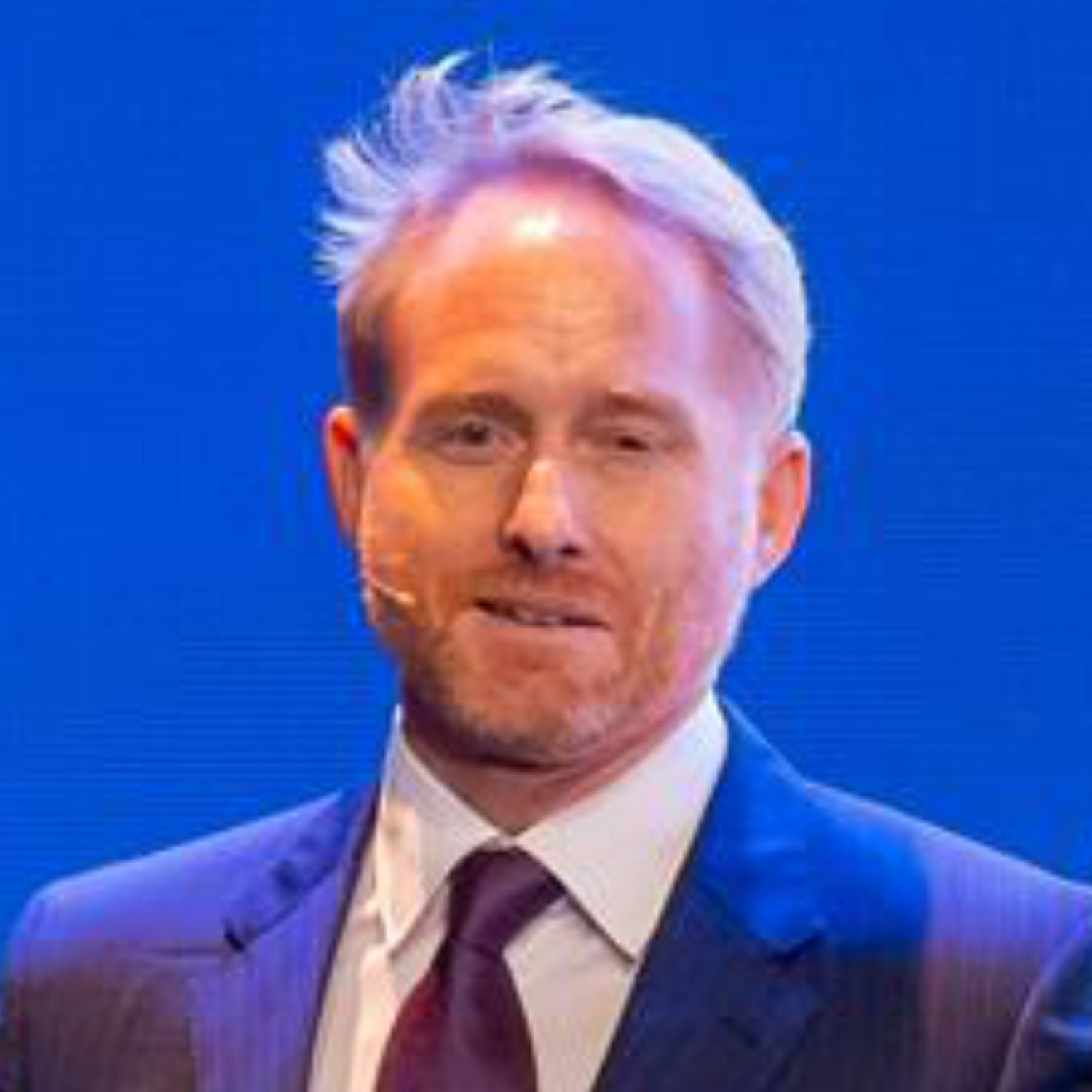
- Education: Ph.D.
- Alma mater: Trinity College, Cambridge University
- Occupations: CEO & Founder of Orb Energy
- Awards: Zayed Future Energy Award

Damian Miller is co-founder & CEO of Orb Energy.

Damian Miller was honored with the Zayed Future Energy Prize, presented by Mohamed bin Zayed Al Nahyan, the third President of the United Arab Emirates.

He is the author of the book Selling Solar: The Diffusion of Renewable Energy in Emerging Markets.

== Education and career ==
In 1998, Damian Miller received a Ph.D. from Trinity College, Cambridge University for his studies on the early commercialization of solar energy technology in emerging markets.

From 1998 until 2006, Damian worked for Shell Solar. At Shell he oversaw operations across Asia and countries in Africa. He expanded business for Shell in India, Sri Lanka, Indonesia and the Philippines with an additional Morocco and South African business and projects in China as well.

Damian and his colleague N. P. Ramesh worked at Shell Solar for more than seven years. After Shell exited the solar market in 2006, they secured venture funding and jointly founded the rooftop solar company Orb Energy in India later that year.

== Notable publications ==
Miller has authored and co-authored several academic and journalistic publications, including:

- "Why the oil companies lost solar", 2013, Pages 52–60, Volume:60, Publisher: Energy Policy
- Selling Solar: The Diffusion of Renewable Energy in Emerging Markets, 30 November 2010, published by Routledge.
- "Power from on High", November 2020, Publisher: The New York Times
- "Entrepreneurs and technology diffusion: How diffusion research can benefit from a greater understanding of entrepreneurship", 2000, Damian Miller, Elizabeth Garnsey, Pages 445–465, Volume:22, Issue:4, Publisher: Technology in Society
- "Learning to lend for off-grid solar power: policy lessons from World Bank loans to India, Indonesia, and Sri Lanka", 2000, Damian Miller, Chris Hope, Volume:28, Issue:2, Pages:87-105, Publisher: Energy Policy
- "Multinational Corporations’ Impacts on the Environment and Communities in the Developing World, 1999, Titus Moser, Damian Miller, Pages:11, Publisher: Routledge

== Television ==
- Texas (TV series) (1981–1982) as Steve Marshall
- Environmental Awareness Campaign for Shell Solar (TV commercial) (1998)

== Awards ==
Damian Miller is the recipient of the Zayed Future Energy Prize 2012 in Abu Dhabi for its engagement in promoting solar energy in developing countries. The award is felicitated by 3rd President of the United Arab Emirates Mohamed bin Zayed Al Nahyan.

== Footnotes ==
- The journey to success of Orb Energy: bringing solar power to India
- Keynote Address on Solar Energy by Damian Miller in 2020
- Interview by Rob Goodier
