= Green to Gold =

Green to Gold may refer to:

- Green to Gold (album), a 2021 studio album by The Antlers
- Green to Gold (book), a 2006 book by Daniel C. Esty and Andrew S. Winston
- "Green to Gold" (song), the Official song for the 2008 Irish Olympic Team
- Green to Gold, a United States Army ROTC program
