= Power, Justice, and the Environment =

2005 book edited by David Pellow and Robert Brulle

Power, Justice, and the Environment: A Critical Appraisal of the Environmental Justice Movement
- Editors: David Pellow and Bob Brulle
- Language: English
- Subject: Environmental Justice
- Published: 2005
- Publisher: The MIT Press
- Publication place: United States
- Media type: Print
- Pages: 349
- ISBN: 978-0262661935

Power, Justice, and the Environment: A Critical Appraisal of the Environmental Justice Movement is a book edited by David Pellow and Robert Brulle. The impetus for the book came from presentations at the 2002 Annual Meeting of the American Sociological Association in Chicago. Divided into three parts, (Environmental Equity and Justice, New Strategies for Achieving Environmental Justice, and Environmental Justice and the Challenges of Globalization), the editors curate a collection of essays by academics, environmental practitioners, and advocates that critique strategies, tactics, organizational structures, and governance in the environmental justice movement, and pose questions about where the movement has been and where it may go.
