= Selling Solar =

2009 book by Damian Miller

- Author: Damian Miller
- Publisher: Earthscan
- Publication date: 2009
- ISBN: 9781844075188

Selling Solar: The Diffusion of Renewable Energy in Emerging Markets is a 2009 Earthscan book by Damian Miller. Miller argues that, in order to solve the climate crisis, the world must immediately and dramatically accelerate the commercialization of renewable energy technology. This needs to happen in the industrialized world, as well as in the emerging markets of the developing world where most future greenhouse gas emissions will occur.

Author Damian Miller holds a doctorate from the Judge School of Business, Cambridge. He is the founder and CEO of Orb Energy, which is based in India.

== See also ==
- List of books about renewable energy
- Clean Tech Nation
