= Allan Schnaiberg =

American sociologist (1939–2009)

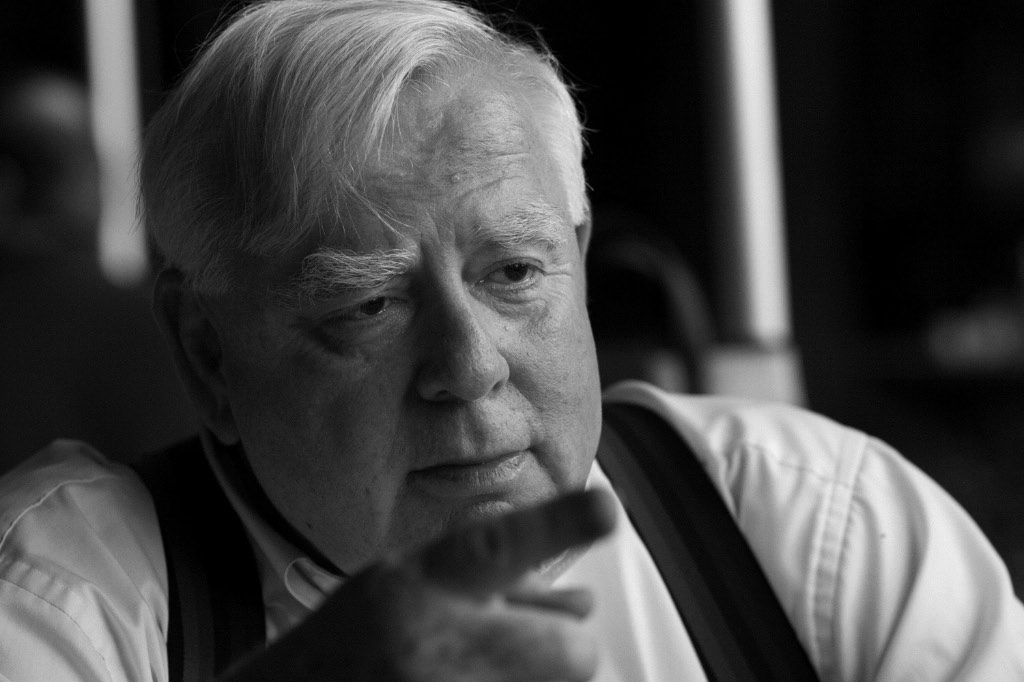
- Born: August 20, 1939; Montreal, Quebec, Canada
- Died: June 6, 2009 (aged 69); Evanston, Illinois, U.S.
- Education: BS, McGill University; MA, PhD, University of Michigan
- Spouse: Edith Harshbarger
- Awards: Distinguished Contribution Award, ASA Section on Environment and Technology
- Scientific career
- Fields: Environmental sociology
- Thesis: Some Determinants and Consequences of Modernism in Turkey (1968)
- Doctoral students: David Naguib Pellow

Allan Schnaiberg (August 20, 1939 – June 6, 2009) was an American sociologist known especially for his contributions to environmental sociology. At the time of his death, Schnaiberg was professor emeritus of Sociology at Northwestern University in Evanston, Illinois.

== Early life and education ==
Born in Montreal on August 20, 1939, Schnaiberg was the son of Belle and Harry Schnaiberg. According to his curriculum vitae, he "Attended McGill University for four years, majoring in Chemistry and minoring in Mathematics. After graduating with distinction in general science, worked for one year as an analytic chemist, and two years as a metallurgical engineer." He received his Ph.D. in sociology from the University of Michigan in 1968; his dissertation was entitled "Some determinants and consequences of modernism in Turkey". He became a naturalized citizen of the United States.

== Career and contributions ==
Schnaiberg joined the sociology faculty at Northwestern University in 1969, serving as departmental chair from 1976 to 1979. He was the author of over 70 scholarly articles and books on topics ranging from globalization and the environment to labor and social inequality. Schnaiberg's "treadmill of production" framework for understanding the social causes and consequences of environmental problems formed one of the first contemporary sociological approaches to understanding environmental problems.

In addition to his 1980 book The Environment: From Surplus to Scarcity, Schnaiberg co-authored four books with his former students: Environment and Society: The Enduring Conflict (St. Martin's Press 1994; Blackburn Press 2000), Local Environmental Struggles: Citizen Activism in the Treadmill of Production (Cambridge University Press 1996), Urban Recycling and the Search for Sustainable Community Development (Princeton University Press 2000), and The Treadmill of Production: Injustice and Unsustainability in the Global Economy (Paradigm Publishers 2008).

He retired from Northwestern in 2008.

== Honors and awards ==
Schnaiberg received the Distinguished Contribution Award of the Section on Environment and Technology, American Sociological Association, in 1984. A few years later, he was elected Chair-elect (1990–91), and then served as Chair (1992–93) of that section.

== Books ==
- Gould, Kenneth A., David N. Pellow, and Allan Schnaiberg. (2008) The Treadmill of Production: Injustice and Unsustainability in the Global Economy. Boulder, Colo.: Paradigm Publishers. ISBN 978-1-59451-506-4
- Gould, Kenneth A., Allan Schnaiberg, and Adam S. Weinberg. (1996) Local Environmental Struggles: Citizen Activism in the Treadmill of Production. Cambridge and New York: Cambridge University Press. ISBN 0-521-55519-1
- Schnaiberg, Allan. (1980) The Environment: From Surplus to Scarcity. New York: Oxford University Press. ISBN 0-19-502610-1
- Schnaiberg, Allan, Nicholas Watts, and Klaus Zimmerman, eds. (1986) Distributional Conflicts in Environmental-Resource Policy. New York: St. Martin's Press. 0312213409
- Schnaiberg, Allan, and Kenneth A. Gould. (1994) Environment and Society: The Enduring Conflict. New York: St. Martin's Press. ISBN 0-312-09128-1
- Weinberg, Adam S., David N. Pellow, and Allan Schnaiberg. (2000) Urban Recycling and the Search for Sustainable Community Development. Princeton, NJ: Princeton University Press. ISBN 0-691-05014-7
