= Bibliography of sustainability =

This is a bibliography of sustainability publications.

== Bibliography ==
- Atkinson, G., Dietz, S. & Neumayer, E. (2007). Handbook of Sustainable Development. Cheltenham: Edward Elgar Publishing. ISBN 978-1-84376-577-6.
- Bartlett, A. (1998). Reflections on Sustainability, Population Growth, and the Environment—Revisited revised version (January 1998) paper first published in Population & Environment 16(1): 5–35. Retrieved on: 2009-03-12.
- Braungart, M., and W. McDonough (2002). Cradle to Cradle: Remaking the Way We Make Things. North Point Press.
- Benyus, J. (1997). Biomimicry: Innovations Inspired by Nature. New York: William Morrow. ISBN 0-06-053322-6.
- Blackburn, W.R. (2007). The Sustainability Handbook. London: Earthscan. ISBN 978-1-84407-495-2.
- Costanza, R., Graumlich, L.J. & Steffen, W. (eds), (2007). Sustainability or Collapse? An Integrated History and Future of People on Earth. Cambridge, MA.: MIT Press. ISBN 978-0-262-03366-4.
- Edwards, A.R., and B. McKibben (2010). Thriving Beyond Sustainability: Pathways to a Resilient Society, New Society Publishers.
- Encyclopedia of Earth
- Formica, P. (2020). Nature's Voice: Health and Humanities Chicago: bioGraph. ISBN 1951946103.
- Komiyama, Hiroshi; Kraines, Steven Benjamin (2008). Vision 2050: Roadmap for a Sustainable Earth. Berlin: Springer. ISBN 978-4-431-09430-2. Archived from the original on 2012-12-11.
- Huesemann, M.H., and J.A. Huesemann (2011). Technofix: Why Technology Won't Save Us or the Environment, Chapter 6, "Sustainability or Collapse", New Society Publishers.
- Jackson, T. (2011). Prosperity without Growth: Economics for a Finite Planet. Routledge.
- James, Paul; with Magee, Liam; Scerri, Andy; Steger, Manfred B. (2015). Urban Sustainability in Theory and Practice: Circles of Sustainability. London: Routledge.
- James, Paul; Nadarajah, Yaso; Haive, Karen; Stead, Victoria (2012). Sustainable Communities, Sustainable Development: Other Paths for Papua New Guinea. Honolulu: University of Hawaii Press.
- Li, R.Y.M. (2011). Building Our Sustainable Cities. Illinois: Common Ground Publishing. ISBN 978-1-86335-834-7.
- Liam Magee; Andy Scerri; Paul James; James A. Thom; Lin Padgham; Sarah Hickmott; Hepu Deng; Felicity Cahill (2013). "Reframing social sustainability reporting: Towards an engaged approach". Environment, Development and Sustainability. 15 (1): 225–43. doi:10.1007/s10668-012-9384-2. S2CID 153452740.
- Norton, B. (2005). Sustainability, A Philosophy of Adaptive Ecosystem Management. Chicago: The University of Chicago Press. ISBN 978-0-226-59521-4.
- Rogers, P., K.F. Jalal, and J.A. Boyd (2007). An Introduction to Sustainable Development. Routledge.
- Welford, R. (1997). Hijacking Environmentalism: Corporate Responses to Sustainable Development. Routledge.
