= Bringing Whales Ashore =

2018 book by Jakobina K. Arch

- Author: Jakobina K. Arch
- Language: English
- Subject: Environmental history; whaling; early modern Japan
- Published: 2018
- Publisher: University of Washington Press
- Publication place: USA
- Media type: Print
- Pages: 272
- ISBN: 978-0-295-74329-5

Bringing Whales Ashore: Oceans and the Environment of Early Modern Japan is a 2018 book by Jakobina K. Arch. The book details the history of whaling in Japan, especially during the Tokugawa period. In particular, the book notes the relationship between the Japanese archipelago and the maritime space around it, as well as between the shore and inland populations of Japan. While shore-based and near-shore whaling was big business in early modern Japan, employing tens of thousands of workers and drawing substantial investment, the practice was unsustainable, and it fell off before the middle of the nineteenth century, even before American whaling ships had a major impact on Pacific whale species. If the oceans are paid attention to as global environments and as key sources of nutrients and economic resources, the book argues, then Tokugawa Japan was neither as self-sufficient nor as sustainable as have previously been argued.

This decline in whaling by about the 1840s brings the book's argument up to the present. The book "finds little evidence of Japan's supposed 9,000-year unbroken whaling tradition in modern factory-ship whaling," which would thus render Japan's twentieth century claims to qualify for exemptions from the International Whaling Commission's moratorium on commercial whaling based on a long indigenous cultural practice of whaling unfounded. While Japan may claim a history of whaling, the book thus argues, it was not continuous, and it was both commercially and ecologically unsustainable from its early history.
