= Mary Appelhof =

Biologist/worm farmer/environmentalist

- Born: June 11, 1936; Detroit, Michigan, US
- Died: May 4, 2005 (aged 68); Rochester, Minnesota, US
- Resting place: Benzonia, Michigan, US
- Education: B.S. and M.S. from Michigan State University
- Occupations: Biologist, teacher, artist, vermicomposting innovator and advocate, and public speaker
- Years active: 1960–2005
- Known for: Developing and advocating worm composting system and environmental activism
- Notable work: Worms Eat My Garbage Worm-a-Way® worm bin
- Awards: National Women's History Project Honoree
- Website: www.wormwoman.com

Mary Arlene Appelhof (June 11, 1936 – May 4, 2005) was an American biologist, vermicomposter, and environmentalist. Her 1982 book Worms Eat My Garbage is still held as seminal reading in the field of vermicomposting. In 2009 she was designated a Women's History Month Honoree by the National Women's History Project.

== Family and education ==
Mary Appelhof was born in Detroit, Michigan. Her father was Pastor of St. John Episcopal Church in Alma, Ohio and St. Thomas Episcopal Church in Berea, Ohio. In 1954 she graduated from Berea High School in Berea, Ohio and in 1958 graduated from Michigan State University in East Lansing, Michigan with a B.S. in biology. In 1959 Appelhof graduated from Michigan State University with an M.S. degree in biology. She later earned an M.S. degree in education and studied advanced biology.

Appelhof had many talents, including expert swimming and award-winning nature photography. She taught science at Kalamazoo Central High School in Kalamazoo, Michigan and taught at Interlochen Arts Academy in Interlochen, Michigan.

== Designing and promoting worm systems ==
In the early 1970s, Appelhof began experimenting with worms and organic waste. Her home worm container would become a new career.

Her vision at the time of the Stockholm Conference for the Human Environment (1972) was "tons of worms could be eating tons of garbage."

Soon she was publicly advocating using the earthworm to recycle food waste. As "Worm Woman," she introduced thousands of schoolchildren and home gardeners to vermicomposting. She was awarded a National Science Foundation grant to do videomicroscopy of live worms. This resulted in a DVD "Wormania."

== Flower Press ==
Appelhof purchased an old mimeograph machine from the Democratic Party in the early 1970s. She used it to produce a brochure, "Basement Worm Bins Produce Potting Soil and Reduce Garbage." By 1976 her publishing interests were firm, and she founded Flower Press. She later explained her thoughts on self-publishing her bestseller, Worms Eat My Garbage.

My goal, however, was not to make lots of money, but to influence people's thinking. To get them to think differently about waste, and give them tools to deal with it. Self-publishing my book was the way I could do that. So I learned what I had to learn to be able to do so.

== Works ==
- Worms Eat My Garbage: How to Set Up and Maintain a Worm Composting System. Flower Press 1982, ISBN 9780942256031
- Worms Eat Our Garbage: Classroom Activities for a Better Environment. Flower Press 1993, ISBN 9780942256055
- Wormania [DVD]. Flowerfield Enterprises. Available from wormwoman.com
