= Derek Hansen =

English-born Australian writer

Derek Hansen (born 1944) is a novelist and short-story writer. He is the author of the 1993 book Lunch with the Generals. Hansen is known for his four-book Lunch with ... series.

He was born in London, England, and raised in New Zealand. As of 2016, he lives in Sydney, Australia. Hansen's works have been published in the US, United Kingdom, Europe and China. He is married, and has two adult children.

He published his first short story at the age of 16 in The Albertian, the magazine of his secondary school, Mount Albert Grammar School. At age 20 Hansen moved to London to work for J. Walter Thompson, and went on to run his own advertising agency. After twenty years, he sold his ad agency and wrote Lunch with the Generals.

Hansen's most popular book, Sole Survivor, had gone through 17 printings by 2005. Tim Pankhurst, editor of The Press, says of Hansen's fishing books, which draws on his New Zealand childhood and passion for fishing: "Hansen's fishing books are the ones that get away. Lend them and they won't come back."

== Bibliography ==
=== Novels ===
- Sole Survivor (1997)
- Lunch with the Generals (1993)
- Lunch with Mussolini (1994)
- Lunch with the Station Master (2002)
- Lunch with a Soldier (2004)
- Blockade (1998)
- Perfect Couple (2000)
- Remember Me (2007)
- A Man You Can Bank On (2011)

=== Short stories ===
- Dead Fishy (1995)
- Psycho Cat (1996)
- Something Fishy (2005)
