= Climber's Paradise =

2014 book by PearlAnn Reichwein

Climber's Paradise: Making Canada's Mountain Parks, 1906–1974
- Author: PearlAnn Reichwein
- Language: English
- Series: Mountain Cairns: A series on the history and culture of the Canadian Rocky Mountains
- Subjects: Mountaineering; National Parks
- Genre: Environmental History
- Published: 2014
- Publisher: University of Alberta Press
- Publication place: Canada
- Pages: 432
- ISBN: 978-0-88864-674-3

Climber's Paradise: Making Canada's Mountain National Parks, 1906–1974 is a 2014 book by PearlAnn Reichwein. In this book, Reichwein provides a detailed history of the Alpine Club of Canada (ACC) and its involvement in the development of Canada's western Rocky Mountain National Parks. Despite its relatively small size, Reichwein shows that the ACC wielded major political influence over recreational and conservation development in western Canada in the early half of the twentieth century. Reichwein uses mountaineering as a device to examine how humans interact with the environment and create cultural meaning.

== Awards ==
Climber's Paradise was awarded the 2015 Clio Prize for the best book on the history of the Canadian prairies by the Canadian Historical Association.
