= A Temperate Empire =

2016 book by Anya Zilberstein

A Temperate Empire: Making Climate Change in Early America
- Author: Anya Zilberstein
- Language: English
- Subject: Climate change; colonial science
- Genre: Environmental History; History of Science
- Published: 2016
- Publisher: Oxford University Press
- Media type: Print
- Pages: 280
- ISBN: 9780190206598

A Temperate Empire: Making Climate Change in Early America is a 2016 book by historian Anya Zilberstein.

== Contents ==
A Temperate Empire explores perceptions of climate among colonists and colonial scientists in New England and Nova Scotia during the seventeenth and eighteenth centuries. This time span corresponded with the Little Ice Age, a period of lower average global temperatures. Zilberstein examines how the harsh but varied climates of the "New World" challenged popular conceptions of the global climate being latitudinal, or the idea that arctic, temperate, and tropical climates surrounded the globe at particular latitudes. Although such conceptions proved to be false, they were considered integral to attracting European settlers to New World colonies. Moreover, Zilberstein documents how scientists and officials reacted to this challenge by advancing an understanding that emphasized the ability of humans to affect and improve the climate, primarily through agricultural cultivation. Colonists argued that settlers could create a warmer and more hospitable climate by "improving" the land, making the region suitable for further settlement. As such, A Temperate Empire demonstrates that debates about climate change and humanity's role in changing the climate extend back well before the modern era.

The book also examines the ways in which colonial ideas about race and climate were considered to be intertwined. Colonists held to the notion that different races were suited to different climates, for example that white bodies were better suited to colder climates. However, the difficulty of attracting settlers due in part to the harsh climate led some to revise such arguments. When Jamaican Maroons were relocated to Nova Scotia in the late eighteenth century, for instance, it became integral to argue that the climate was in fact temperate enough for black bodies. Such episodes reveal further how colonial ideas and climatic realities seemed to shape each other in this period.

== Awards and recognition ==
A Temperate Empire was awarded the 2016's Berkshire Conference of Women Historians Book Prize. Dagomar Degroot, the founder of the Climate History Network, calls A Temperate Empire "one of the most intriguing climate history books ever published."

== See also ==
- Little Ice Age
- History of climate change science
