= Nature, Place, and Story =

2017 book about historic sites in Canada

Nature, Place, and Story: Rethinking Historic Sites in Canada
- Author: Claire Elizabeth Campbell
- Language: English
- Subject: National Historic Sites
- Genre: Environmental history
- Published: 2017
- Publisher: McGill-Queen's University Press
- Publication place: Canada
- Pages: 224
- ISBN: 9780773551251

Nature, Place, and Story: Rethinking Historic Sites in Canada is a 2017 book by Claire Elizabeth Campbell, professor of history at Bucknell University.

== Summary ==
=== Sites examined ===
In Nature, Place, and Story, Campbell examines five historic sites in eastern, central, and western Canada:

- L’Anse-aux-Meadows in Newfoundland and Labrador
- the Grand-Pré National Historic Site in Nova Scotia
- the Fort William Historical Park in Ontario
- The Forks in Manitoba
- and the Bar U Ranch in Alberta.

=== Arguments ===
She uses these sites as evidence to argue that the interpretation of historic sites in Canada has traditionally neglected to highlight sites' environmental history, opting instead to focus solely on sites' human history. Campbell argues that, in the 1950s, the Government of Canada opted for such an approach to facilitate the growth of the Canadian nation state; the Canadian government wanted historic sites to emphasize Canadian unity and not environmental issues, as "there [was] no political purpose in highlighting the environmental costs of nation building." Campbell argues that excluding environmental history from historic sites is a mistake, because, according to her, human and environmental history are inextricably linked. Campbell thus argues that the focus of these sites should now include this previously ignored environmental history, and she suggests ways in which each of these five sites might incorporate more environmental history in their interpretations, including information on the impacts that building the Canadian nation state had on the environment. Campbell's book is not just backwards-looking; she suggests that historic sites can be valuable resources for solving today's environmental issues, and the book has been called a "call to arms" for public historians to draw connections between their history and contemporary environmental issues. Campbell shows that each of these sites offers lessons that can inform modern debates on the environment. For instance, L’Anse-aux-Meadows can educate its visitors about "arctic resources, expansionism, and climate change."

== Reception ==
Alan Gordon writes that "[the book's] suggestion that public history pay greater attention to environmental issues is worth heeding". J. L. Anderson calls it "a small book that packs a big punch".
