= Do Glaciers Listen? =

2005 Canadian non-fiction book

Do Glaciers Listen? Local Knowledge, Colonial Encounters, and Social Imagination
- Author: Julie Cruikshank
- Language: English
- Series: Brenda and David McLean Canadian Studies
- Genre: Anthropology
- Published: 2005
- Publisher: UBC Press
- Publication place: Canada
- Pages: 328
- ISBN: 9780774811866

Do Glaciers Listen? Local Knowledge, Colonial Encounters, and Social Imagination is a 2005 book by Canadian anthropologist Julie Cruikshank. Focusing on the Mount Saint Elias region where Alaska, the Yukon, and British Columbia meet, Cruikshank highlights the physical and cultural changes of the region by examining glaciers. The late stages of the Little Ice Age brought about significant physical changes to glaciers in the region, and Cruikshank examines the cosmologies and interpretations of both local Indigenous populations - in particular the Tlingit and Athapaskan peoples - and European explorers who began entering the region at that time.

== Awards ==
Do Glaciers Listen won the 2006 Vic Turner Prize in Ethnographic Writing from the Society for Humanistic Anthropology; the 2006 Clio Prize (North) from the Canadian Historical Association; and the 2006 Julian Steward Award from the American Anthropological Association.
