= The Riverkeepers =

Book by John Cronin and Robert F. Kennedy, Jr.

- Authors: John Cronin and Robert Kennedy Jr.
- Subject: Environmentalism
- Genre: Non-fiction
- Publisher: Charles Scribner's Sons
- Publication date: 15 Oct 1997
- ISBN: 978-0-684-83908-0

The Riverkeepers: Two Activists Fight to Reclaim Our Environment as a Basic Human Right is a 1997 book written by John Cronin and Robert F. Kennedy, Jr.

The book documents its authors' activism and legal action against the corporate polluters of the Hudson River in New York.

== Publication ==
The Riverkeepers is a 1997 book written by John Cronin, head of the Riverkeeper organization at the time, and Robert F. Kennedy, Jr., Riverkeeper's then chief litigator.

The book was published in 1997, in New York by Charles Scribner's Sons.

== Synopsis ==
The book, with a foreword by Al Gore, documents the work by its authors in their legal battles with the corporate polluters of the Hudson River. The authors write about their 1983 founding of Riverkeeper non-profit organization and the almost-100 lawsuits they have started. Targets of the author's litigation include General Electric and Exxon. The authors are critical of the United States Congress.

The book notes "right-wing stereotypes about environmental elitism" and recommends strategies to persuade political opponents. Recommended strategies are local action, linking environmentalism with preserving historical industry such as fishing, rather than as being against economic growth, and framing environmentalism as a struggle "against special interests who would monopolize, exclude, and liquidate [resources] for cash."

== Critical reception ==
Kirkus Reviews notes the book's lack of objectivity and describes the authors as "self-righteous" but praised the book as informative. Publishers Weekly described the book as "staunch and quietly passionate".
