= Blockade (novel) =

1998 novel written by Derek Hansen

- Author: Derek Hansen
- Publisher: HarperCollins
- Publication date: January 1, 1998
- ISBN: 978-0-732-26496-3

Blockade is a 1998 novel written by Derek Hansen about logging in Australia.

== Plot summary ==
The protagonist is Miklos Bollok, a logging company owner who uses corrupt politicians to clear-fell the last remaining wilderness in Victoria, Australia. He is stymied by a direct action campaign by conservationists. His downfall also comes about by a dark secret that is made public by his wife.

== Release details ==
- 1998, Australia, HarperCollins, (ISBN 0-7322-6466-9), Pub date 1 January 1998, paperback (First edition)
- 1999, reprinted, (ISBN 0-7322-6496-0).

== Reception ==
Jean Ferguson of the Illawarra Mercury calls it "A passionate and explosive new novel from a great storyteller". Herald Sun's Simon Caterson writes "A well-spun yarn lasting 500 easily digestible pages, Blockade seems destined to repeat the commercial success of his earlier books". Stephen Prickett of the Canberra Times writes "Once set in motion, the action is fast-moving, sometimes funny, sometimes violent, but always compulsively gripping".
