= Risk Governance: Coping with Uncertainty in a Complex World =

2008 book by Ortwin Renn

- Author: Ortwin Renn
- Series: The Earthscan Risk in Society Series
- Publisher: Routledge
- Publication date: 2008
- Media type: Print (hardback, paperback), ebook
- Pages: 476 pages
- ISBN: 9781844072927 First edition print

Risk Governance: Coping with Uncertainty in a Complex World is part of The Earthscan Risk in Society Series of books. Published in 2008 and written by risk theorist and researcher Ortwin Renn, the book brings together and updates Renn's work, integrating concepts of risk in the social, engineering and natural sciences.

== Synopsis ==
Risk Governance presents the context of risk handling before proceeding through the core topics of assessment, evaluation, perception, management and communication. The main focus is on systemic risks, such as genetically modified organisms, which have a high degree of complexity, uncertainty and ambiguity, and with major repercussions on financial, economic, and social impact areas.

== Reception ==
Reviewing for Natural Hazards, Heriberta Castaños and Cinna Lomnitz praised the book as important and noted that it included coverage of German social science on disaster research as "The coverage of key German references has always been uneven." Rolf Lidskog reviewed for Acta Sociologica, stating that "Because of its broad character, where different thematic issues (perceptions, management, communication, etc.) are discussed, the book has a somewhat eclectic character."
