= Voices from the Gathering Storm =

2005 book edited by Joseph Arcos, Mary Argus and Frederick DiCarlo

Voices from the Gathering Storm: The Web of Ecological-Societal Crisis
- Author: Joseph C. Arcos (Editor), Mary F. Arcos (Editor), Frederick J. DiCarlo (Editor)
- Language: English
- Genre: Non-fiction
- Publication date: 2005
- Media type: Print
- ISBN: 978-1595711014

Voices from the Gathering Storm: The Web of Ecological-Societal Crisis is a 2005 non-fiction book that was published by Word Association Publishers and edited by Joseph Arcos, Mary Argus and Frederick DiCarlo.

== Synopsis ==
A collection of essays that discuss social, cultural, and technological factors contributing to our environmental predicament. It proposes the need for a change in the religion of consumption, a change in our definitions of progress and success from increased consumption to increased stewardship of our diminishing resources and shrinking planet.

== Contributors ==
- Thomas Berry
- Sharon L. Camp
- Francesco diCastri
- Daniel D. Chiras
- Herman Daly
- Matthew P. Fox
- Michael Gregory
- Joel Hilliker
- Kaye H. Kilburn
- Margaret L. Kripke
- Janice D. Longstreth
- Lester Milbrath
- Stephen S. Morse
- Hugh Pitcher
- John Poppy
- Van Rensselaer Potter
- Ellen K. Silbergeld
- James A. Swa

== Reception ==
The Midwest Book Review positively reviewed Voices from the Gathering Storm, calling it "expertly compiled" and a "remarkable body of study". The Times-News also praised the book, saying it was "carefully researched" and "hard-hitting".
