= State of the World 2010: Transforming Cultures: From Consumerism to Sustainability =

State of the World (book series) 2010: Transforming Cultures: From Consumerism to Sustainability is a report and project conceived and directed by Erik Assadourian, a senior fellow at Worldwatch, and published by the Worldwatch Institute that analyzes the consumer cultural paradigm. It includes 26 articles from 60 eminent researchers and experts on consumerism, sustainability, and cultural change, and provides essential facts and case studies on how societies can transition from consumerism to sustainability. The report has received positive reviews from several esteemed academics, including Bill McKibben, Tim Jackson, Gus Speth, and Muhammad Yunus. It has also been translated into 11 different languages and adjusted for a youth audience.

In the report, Assadourian affirms that, "Consumer cultures will need to change for the human species to truly thrive," and that engaging in ethical consumerism without challenging larger societal structures will not bring about true sustainability. Authors of the report describe how to harness the world's leading institutions–education, the media, business, governments, traditions, and social movements–to reorient cultures towards sustainability.

== See also ==
- State of the World (book series)
- Prosperity Without Growth
- Degrowth
- Post growth
- Sustainable living
- Steady state economy
- Ecological Economics
- Ecolabel
