= Pumpkin: The Curious History of an American Icon =

2012 book by Cindy Ott

- Author: Cindy Ott
- Language: English
- Subject: Environmental History
- Published: 2012
- Publisher: University of Washington Press
- Publication place: United States
- Media type: Print
- Pages: 336
- ISBN: 9780295993324

Pumpkin: The Curious History of an American Icon is a 2012 book by Cindy Ott. The author follows the history of the pumpkin, from Native American diet staple, to food for peasants, feed for livestock, and now as the symbol of autumn and a multi-million dollar industry. Once considered a desperate substitute to use in beer and bread, only in the absence of barley and wheat, the pumpkin's popularity grew out the romantic nostalgia of rural residents turned city-dwellers, and its commercialization has now reached unprecedented heights. Ott traces the shifting status of the pumpkin in American culture. The author goes as far as to paint the pumpkin as a cultural icon that helped forge a uniquely American identity.
