= The Economical Environmentalist =

- Author: Prashant Vaze
- Language: English

The Economical Environmentalist is a book by Prashant Vaze about the effects of climate change and what practical measures can be taken to reduce the amount of energy one consumes. It covers how best to save energy and points out contradictions such as "The one that particularly exasperates me is the “food miles” obsession, whereby we eschew tomatoes from Spain and roses flown in from Kenya, in favour of local products grown in a heated greenhouse with a far greater carbon footprint." In the book he compares the savings available for several real-world examples of people so one can see what changes are possible to make.
