= Wet Prairie =

2011 book by Shannon Stunden Bower

Wet Prairie: People, Land, and Water in Agricultural Manitoba
- Author: Shannon Stunden Bower
- Language: English
- Series: Nature | History | Society
- Subject: Agriculture
- Genre: Environmental history
- Published: 2011
- Publisher: UBC Press
- Publication place: Canada
- Pages: 264
- ISBN: 9780774818520

Wet Prairie: People, Land, and Water in Agricultural Manitoba is a 2011 book by Canadian historian Shannon Stunden Bower. The book examines the history of settlement and farming in the unique landscape of southern Manitoba, notable for its poor drainage and thus high levels of moisture that contrast with the aridity of much of the Great Plains. Stunden Bower uses this unique context to focus on the development of liberalism on the Prairies, from the late nineteenth into the twentieth centuries, highlighting tensions between private property and state intervention and between agricultural development and wetland conservation. The book uses the term "colloquial liberalisms" to describe how variable landscapes shaped local interpretations of liberalism, highlighting the ways in which ideologies interact with the environment. In this case, drainage needs and policy created "differing understandings of the appropriate interplay of individual land rights with government tax or environmental policies." Wet Prairie ultimately demonstrates "that Canada’s (and thus any nation’s) political history cannot fully be understood without paying attention to the environment."

== Awards and recognition ==
Wet Prairie has won numerous awards, including the 2012 Clio Prize for the Prairies from the Canadian Historical Association, the 2012 K.D. Srivastava Prize from UBC Press, and the 2013 Manitoba Day Award. The book has been called "an important contribution to the geographical, environmental, political, and cultural history of the Prairie Provinces and to the Great Plains as a whole."
