= Power, Profit and Protest =

Book by Verity Burgmann

- Author: Verity Burgmann
- Language: English
- Subject: Politics
- Genre: Australian Society
- Publisher: Allen & Unwin
- Publication date: 2003
- Publication place: Australia

Power, Profit and Protest: Australian Social Movements and Globalisation is a 2003 book by Verity Burgmann.

The book was originally published in 1993, and the 2003 edition is substantially expanded. It contains a new chapter on "social movements and social change", and another on the "anti-corporate globalisation movement". There is a new concluding chapter on globalisation as the "cancer stage of capitalism".

Cathie Jensen-Lee writes "This book provides an interesting and thoughtful analysis of several movements for change in Australian society; namely the Aboriginal movement, the women's movement, the green movement and the anti-capitalist/anti-corporate globalisation movements."

== See also ==
- Tasmania's Wilderness Battles
