= The Consumer's Guide to Effective Environmental Choices =

1999 handbook printed by Union of Concerned Scientists

The Consumer's Guide to Effective Environmental Choices: Practical Advice from the Union of Concerned Scientists
- Author: Michael Brower, Warren Leon
- Language: English
- Genre: Environmental
- Publisher: Three Rivers Press
- Publication date: 1999
- Publication place: United States
- Media type: (Electronic, Paperback)
- Pages: 304
- ISBN: 0-609-80281-X
- OCLC: 39335766
- Dewey Decimal: 363.7/00973 21
- LC Class: HF5415.33.U6 B76 1999

The Consumer's Guide to Effective Environmental Choices: Practical Advice from the Union of Concerned Scientists is a handbook printed by the nonprofit environmental group Union of Concerned Scientists.

In accordance with UCS's pledge to provide scientifically sound and nonbiased solutions to environmental problems, this book's main goal is to debunk myths associated with the environmental movement and reinforce realistic ways in which the average citizen can do his or her part in conservation.

The back cover of the book reads:

"Paper or plastic? Bus or car? Old house or new? Cloth diapers or disposables? Some choices have a huge impact on the environment; others are of negligible importance. To those of us who care about our quality of life and what is happening to the earth, this is a vastly important issue. In these pages, the Union of Concerned Scientists help inform consumers about everyday decisions that significantly affect the environment. For example, a few major decisions such as the choice of a house or vehicle have such a disproportionately large effect on the environment that minor environmental infractions shrink by comparison. This book identifies the 4 Most Significant Consumer Related Environmental Problems, 7 Most Damaging Categories, 11 Priority Actions, and 7 Rules for Responsible Consumption."
