= Shaped by the West Wind =

2004 book by Claire Elizabeth Campbell

Shaped by the West Wind: Nature and History in Georgian Bay
- Author: Claire Elizabeth Campbell
- Language: English
- Series: Nature | History | Society
- Genre: Environmental history
- Published: 2004
- Publisher: UBC Press
- Publication place: Canada
- Pages: 320
- ISBN: 9780774810982

Shaped by the West Wind: Nature and History in Georgian Bay is a 2004 book by Claire Elizabeth Campbell. This book is a comprehensive environmental history of Ontario's Georgian Bay. Campbell analyzes how reactions to this geographic era changed through time and how these reactions and attitudes shaped Canadian cultural expression, including art and literature. In her analysis of these cultural productions, Campbell demonstrates how nonhuman forces interacted with and shaped both the landscape and the people who encountered the landscape. Shaped by the West Wind was part of an initial surge in environmental history scholarship in Canada during the 2000s.
