= An Introduction to Sustainable Development =

2007 book by Peter Rogers, Kazi F. Jalal and John A. Boyd

- Author: Peter Rogers, Kazi F. Jalal, John A. Boyd
- Language: English
- Publisher: Earthscan Publications Ltd
- Publication date: 2007
- Pages: 416 pages
- ISBN: 978-1-84407-521-8
- OCLC: 170039446
- Dewey Decimal: 338.9/27 22
- LC Class: HC79.E5 R63134 2008

An Introduction to Sustainable Development is a 2007 Earthscan book which presents sustainable development as a process that "meets the needs of the present generation without compromising the ability of future generations to meet their own needs". This textbook examines the environmental, economic, and social dimensions of sustainable development by exploring changing patterns of consumption, production, and distribution of resources. Case studies include coastal wetlands; community-based water supply and sanitation systems; and sustainable energy, forest, and industrial development.

Author Peter P. Rogers is a Professor of Environmental Engineering at Harvard University, USA. Co-authors Kazi F. Jalal and John A. Boyd are lecturers at Harvard's Extension School.
