= Worms Eat My Garbage =

1982 book by Mary Appelhof

- First edition
- Author: Mary Appelhof (original); Joanne Olszewski (35th anniv. ed.)
- Language: English
- Publisher: Flower Press
- Publication date: 1982
- Pages: 100
- ISBN: 9780942256031
- OCLC: 1036925977

Worms Eat My Garbage: How to Set Up & Maintain a Worm Composting System is a book by Mary Appelhof self-published in 1982 under the company name Flower Press. The book is still held as seminal reading in the field of vermicomposting.

== Contents ==
The book gives instruction for vermicomposting (also called worm composting). It explains how to build, or where to buy, a bin for worm composting, each of the steps of converting garbage into fertilizer, and the uses of that fertilizer when the worms are finished with it.

== Updates and other versions ==
The book has received many updated versions over the years. There is a similarly named version titled Worms Eat Our Garbage: Classroom Activities for a Better Environment, first published in 1993 and directed at classroom education. In 2017 Joanne Olszewski updated the book for a 35th anniversary edition, and in addition to Appelhof's work the new book contains information on invasive species and changes in recycling over the last two decades.

== Author ==
Mary Appelhof was considered a pioneer in vermicomposting. She died on May 4, 2005.
