= Charles T. Rubin =

American political scientist and philosopher

- Occupations: Professor and author
- Spouse: Leslie Rubin (m. 1981)

Academic background
- Education: Case Western Reserve University and Boston College

Academic work
- Institutions: Duquesne University and Princeton University
- Main interests: Transhumanism Environmentalism

Charles T. Rubin is an American political science professor, philosopher and writer. Rubin was raised in Cleveland, Ohio, and attended nearby Case Western Reserve University, receiving a bachelor's degree in philosophy and political science in 1975. He went on to study at Boston College, where he graduated with a doctoral degree in 1983 and also where he met his wife Leslie Rubin, a fellow political science academic. Rubin and his wife taught at Kenyon College before both moving to Duquesne University as professors and raising their children. Rubin began at Duquesne as an assistant professor in 1987 and continued teaching there for over 30 years. He was appointed as an endowed chair in 2019.

Rubin is the author of The Green Crusade, a 1998 book which questions the scientific basis for claims and predictions made by environmentalists, specifically naming Rachel Carson and Paul Erlich. In 2008, the President's Council on Bioethics commissioned two essays by Rubin on upholding human dignity, which he titled "Human Dignity and the Future of Man" and "Commentary on Bostrom". In 2014, his book Eclipse of Man was released. In it, Rubin considers the advancements of technology and cautions against hasty adoption of transhumanism.

== Works ==
- Rubin, Charles T.; Rubin, Leslie G. (1984). The Quest for Justice. Lexington, MA: Ginn Press. ISBN 978-0536059581.
- Rubin, Charles T. (Spring 1989). "Environmental Policy and Environmental Thought: Commoner and Ruckelshaus". Environmental Ethics. 11 (1). Athens, GA: 27–51. doi:10.5840/enviroethics198911124.
- Rubin, Charles T. (1996). "First contact: Copernican moment or nine day's wonder?". In Kingsley, Stuart A.; Lemarchand, Guillermo A. (eds.). The Search for Extraterrestrial Intelligence (SETI) in the Optical Spectrum II: 31 January-1 February 1996, San Jose, California, Band 2704. Proceedings of SPIE - the International Society for Optical Engineering. Bellingham, WA: SPIE—The International Society for Optical Engineering. pp. 161–184. ISBN 978-0-8194-2078-7.
- Rubin, Charles T. (1 March 1998). The Green Crusade: Rethinking the Roots of Environmentalism. Rowman & Littlefield. ISBN 978-08-476-8817-3.
- Rubin, Charles T. (7 June 2000). Conservation Reconsidered: Nature, Virtue, and American Liberal Democracy. Rowman & Littlefield. ISBN 978-08-476-9716-8.
- Rubin, Charles T. (Fall 2007). "Thumos in Space". The New Atlantis (18): 66–71.
- Rubin, Charles T. (March 2008). "Commentary on Bostrom". Human Dignity and Bioethics: Essays Commissioned by the President's Council on Bioethics. Washington, DC: 207–211.
- Rubin, Charles T. (March 2008). "Human Dignity and the Future of Man". Human Dignity and Bioethics: Essays Commissioned by the President's Council on Bioethics. Washington, DC: 155–172.
- Rubin, Charles T. (5 November 2008). "What is the Good of Transhumanism?". In Chadwick, Ruth; Gordijn, Bert (eds.). Medical Enhancement and Posthumanity (PDF). Springer Publishing. ISBN 978-90-481-8005-9. Archived (PDF) from the original on 16 October 2014.
- Rubin, Charles T. (2 September 2014). Eclipse of Man: Human Extinction and the Meaning of Progress. Encounter Books. ISBN 978-1-5940-3736-8.
- Rubin, Charles T. (17 May 2016). "Opinion: Transhumanists are searching for a dystopian future". The Washington Post.
