= Cinderella of the New South =

1995 book by Lynette Boney Wrenn

Cinderella of the New South: A History of the Cottonseed Industry, 1855–1955
- Author: Lynette Boney Wrenn
- Language: English
- Genre: History
- Published: 1995
- Publisher: University of Tennessee Press
- Publication place: United States
- ISBN: 9780870498824

Cinderella of the New South: A History of the Cottonseed Industry, 1855–1955 is a 1995 book by Lynette Boney Wrenn. It is significant as the first scholarly book to examine the history of the cottonseed industry in the southern United States. In Cinderella of the New South, Wrenn argues that the cottonseed industry between 1855 and 1955 was an example of a lack of industrialization in the southern United States. The book covers the antebellum origins of the cottonseed industry and the rapid rise of the industry between 1880 and 1914, which was fuelled by demand for cottonseed products, such as cooking oil, soaps, and candles. Cinderella of the New South addresses the extraction-to-manufacturing process of the cottonseed crop during the 1880–1914 period, during which the southern mills performed the least-profitable step of crushing the cottonseed while largely northern-owned businesses handled the more-lucrative secondary manufacturing and marketing stages. The book ends with the consolidation of the cottonseed industry after World War II and the subsequent end of the hydraulic crushing of the seed in the 1950s.
