= Julie Cruikshank =

Canadian anthropologist

- Born: 1950 (age 75–76)
- Scientific career
- Fields: Anthropology
- Institutions: University of British Columbia

Julie Cruikshank is a Canadian anthropologist known for her research collaboration with Indigenous peoples of the Yukon. She is a Professor Emerita in the Department of Anthropology at the University of British Columbia. She has lived and worked for over a decade in the Yukon Territory, creating an oral history of the region, through her work with people including Angela Sidney, Kitty Smith, and Annie Ned. Her work focuses mainly on the practical and theoretical developments in oral tradition studies.

== Awards and achievements ==
In 2012, Cruikshank was appointed an Officer to the Order of Canada. In 2010, she became a fellow in the Royal Society of Canada, the Academies of Arts, Humanities, and Sciences of Canada.

In 2006, Cruikshank's book from UBC Press, Do Glaciers Listen? Local Knowledge, Colonial Encounters, and Social Imagination, won the Julian Steward Award from the Anthropology and Environment Society, which is a section of the American Anthropological Association. The book also won the Victor Turner Prize for Ethnographic Writing in 2006.

In 1995, Cruikshank was awarded the Robert F. Heizer Prize by the American Society for Ethnohistory as well as a UBC prize Prize for Excellence in Teaching from the Faculty of Arts. In 1992, she was awarded the UBC Killam Research Prize and two years later in 1994, received the UBC Izaak Walton Killam Memorial Faculty Research Fellowship.

== Publications ==
=== Books ===
- Cruikshank, Julie (2005). Do Glaciers Listen? Local Knowledge, Colonial Encounters and Social Imagination. Vancouver: UBC Press.
- Cruikshank, Julie (1998). The Social Life of Stories: Narrative and Knowledge in Northern Canada. Lincoln: University of Nebraska Press.
- Cruikshank, Julie (1991). Reading Voices: Dan Dha Ts'edenintth'e. Vancouver: Douglas and McIntyre.
- Cruikshank, Julie (1990). Life Lived Like a Story: Life Stories of Three Yukon Native Elders. Lincoln: University of Nebraska Press.

=== Edited volumes ===
- 2007. My Old People’s Stories: A Legacy for Yukon First Nations, by Catharine McClellan. 3 volumes. Occasional Paper in Yukon History, 5(1-3), 804 pages.
- Changing Traditions in Northern Ethnography
