= The Gene Revolution =

2006 book by Sakiko Fukuda-Parr

The Gene Revolution: GM Crops and Unequal Development
- Author: Sakiko Fukuda-Parr
- Language: English
- Subject: Genetic manipulation
- Publisher: Routledge
- Publication date: 2006
- Media type: Paperback
- Pages: 280
- ISBN: 978-1844074105

The Gene Revolution: GM Crops and Unequal Development is a 2006 book by Professor Sakiko Fukuda-Parr.

While some people do not support genetic manipulation (GM), others view it as an important technological solution to limited agricultural output, increasing populations, and climate change. The book provides a detailed analysis of debate about GM adoption in developing countries, which are dealing with poverty and trying to better compete in the global economy. Per the introduction, the book focuses on five countries' use of GM technology, Argentina, Brazil, China, India, and South Africa.

The Gene Revolution refers to a phase following the Green Revolution during which agricultural biotechnology was heavily implemented.

== See also ==
- Genetically modified food controversies
- Gene Revolution
