= Scorched: South Africa's Changing Climate =

Book by Leonie Joubert

- Author: Leonie Joubert
- Publication date: 30 September 2006
- ISBN: 9781868144372

Scorched: South Africa's Changing Climate is a non-fiction book by Leonie Joubert.

== Synopsis ==
Scorched is a narrative on southern Africa’s landscapes in the age of climate change. It reads from a local point of view. The book deals with climate modeling produced by scientific institutions. Scorched ponders the morality of the changes mankind has wrought, as well as the future of life on Earth.

== Awards ==
In May 2007, Scorched was awarded an honorable mention by the judging panel of the Sunday Times Alan Paton Literary Awards.
"The judges have chosen to cite Scorched for an Honorary Award for breaking into the new territory of science journalism, and its skill in popularising this often inaccessible field."

- Paperback - 240 pages (30 September 2006) South Africa: Wits University Press ISBN 9781868144372
