= David Pellow =

American sociologist (born 1969)

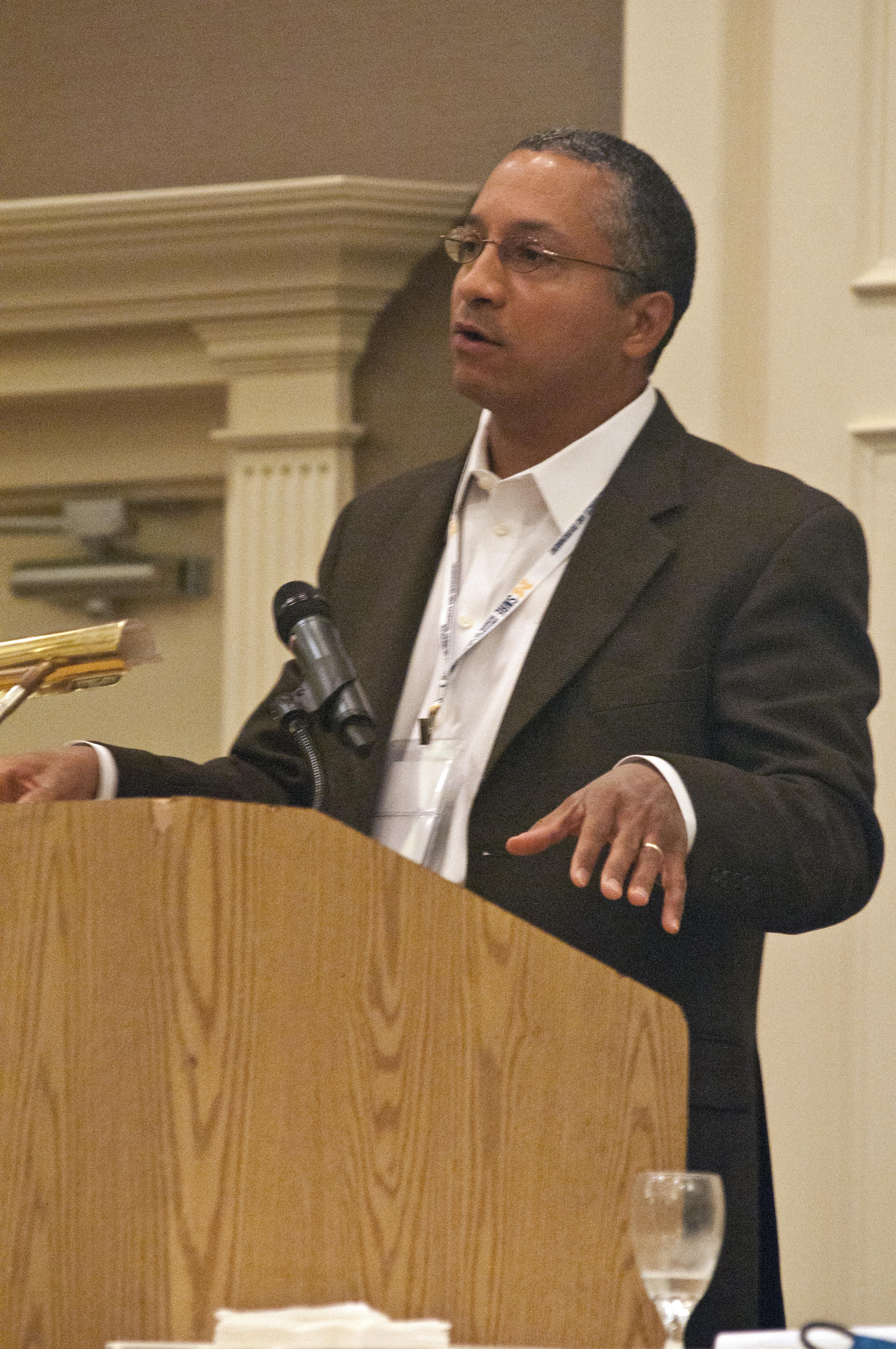
David Pellow in 2012

David Naguib Pellow (born 1969) is an American sociologist who is Dehlsen Chair and Professor of Environmental Studies and Director of the Global Environmental Justice Project at the University of California, Santa Barbara. Previously he was Professor, Don Martindale Endowed Chair, Department of Sociology, University of Minnesota and associate professor of Ethnic Studies at the university of California, San Diego. His area of specialisation include issues concerning environmental justice, race and ethnicity, labour, social protest, animal rights, immigration, free trade agreements, globalization, and the global impacts of the high tech industry in Asia, Latin America and elsewhere.

== Biography and Education ==
He received a Ph.D. in Sociology from Northwestern University in 1998, with a thesis "Black workers in green industries: the hidden infrastructure of environmental racism."

== Focus of work ==
Pellow's work has focused on the "social and environmental impacts of the U.S. and international waste management industries (garbage, pesticides, incineration, electronic computer wastes etc.) and the global social protest movement that has emerged to combat this." He has also published on issues such as environmental racism, racial capitalism, occupational health hazards, economic globalization, international environmental protest movements, Silicon Valley industries, the global environment in high tech and social impacts, waste management industry, recycling industry, international movement of hazardous chemical wastes and international laws/conventions/treaties concerning environmental protection.

== Books ==
=== Authored ===
- The Silicon Valley of Dreams: Environmental Justice, Immigrant Workers, and the High-Tech Global Economy New York University Press 2002, (with Lisa Sun-Hee Park);
- Urban Recycling and the Search for Sustainable Community Development Princeton University Press 2002, (with Adam S. Weinberg and Allan Schnaiberg);
- Garbage Wars: The Struggle for Environmental Justice in Chicago MIT Press, 2004
- Challenging the Chip: Labor Rights and Environmental Justice in the Global Electronics Industry. Philadelphia: Temple University Press, 2006 (with Ted Smith and David Allen Sommerfeld)
  - Translated into Chinese by Di qiu gong min ji jin hui. 挑戰晶片 : 全球電子業的勞動權與環境正義 / Tiao zhan jing pian : quan qiu dian zi ye de lao dong quan yu huan jing zheng yi Xin bei shi xin dian qu : Qun xue, 2014
  - Translated into Korean by Jeong-ok Kong. Challenging the chip : segye jeonja saneob-ui nodong-gwon-gwa hwan-gyeong jeong-ui Seoul: May Day Publishers, 2009.
- The Treadmill of Production: Injustice and Unsustainability in the Global Economy Paradigm Press 2008, (with Kenneth Gould and Allan Schnaiberg)
- The Slums of Aspen: Immigrants vs. The Environment in America’s Eden. New York, NY: New York University Press. 2011. (with Lisa Sun-Hee Park)
- Total Liberation: The Power and Promise of Animal Rights and the Radical Earth Movement University of Minnesota Press 2014
- Resisting Global Toxics: Transnational Movements for Environmental Justice MIT Press 2014;
- What is Critical Environmental Justice? Polity Press 2018

=== Edited ===
- Power, Justice, and the Environment: A Critical Appraisal of the Environmental Justice Movement MIT Press, 2005. (co-edited with Robert J. Brulle )
- Keywords for Environmental Studies New York University Press, 2016 (co-edited with Joni Adamson and William Gleason); ISBN 9780814762967
