= Tasmania's Wilderness Battles =

2008 book by Greg Buckman

Tasmania's Wilderness Battles: A History
- First edition cover
- Author: Greg Buckman
- Language: English
- Series: Jacana
- Genre: Environmentalism, Current Affairs, Social Issues
- Publisher: Allen & Unwin
- Publication date: 2008
- Publication place: Australia
- Media type: Print (Paperback)
- Pages: 304
- ISBN: 978-1-74175-464-3

Tasmania's Wilderness Battles: A History is a 2008 book by environmentalist Greg Buckman, who has "spent [his life] fighting Tasmanian environmental battles." The book looks at the wilderness areas of Tasmania which have been the focus of extensive conflict over environmental issues. Buckman presents a record of some of the significant events in that conflict, primarily from the viewpoint of an environmentalist.

== Overview ==
The book has several primary themes, including:

- Hydro Tasmania, about the issues of the Franklin Dam and Lake Pedder
- Forestry, with the final section focusing on Gunns
- Mining, focusing on Mount Lyell
- National Parks

The black and white photographs included capture the iconic characters of the major environmental battles of the era being examined, and include images of Eric Reece, Olegas Truchanas, Doug Lowe, and Bob Brown.

Tasmania's Wilderness Battles is one of a number of books that were published in connection with the 25th anniversary of the halting of the Franklin Dam project, one of the campaigns which is described in the book, and in which Buckman was active. He has also been involved in campaigns to save Tasmania's forests. Since the early 1990s he has been associated with the Tasmanian and Australian Greens.

The book was launched in Hobart on 12 June 2008 by a Green senator, Christine Milne, outside the Tasmanian State Parliament.

The book was longlisted for the 2009 John Button Prize.

== Critical reception ==
Stephenie Cahalan, reviewing and contrasting Tasmania’s Wilderness Battles and Geoff Law's The River Runs Free, notes that environmental issues and the places over which the legal and political battles were fought "have played a huge part in shaping the Tasmanian parliament either by prompting the election of Green party candidates or featuring strongly in policy and debate." By including excerpts from the 1998 Labor Green Accord, Tasmania’s Wilderness Battles, Cahalan writes, "helps to detail an important feature of Tasmanian political history which is frequently referred to but seldom explained." Buckman "studies Tasmania’s three big industries — hydro-electricity, mining and forestry — and provides surprisingly easy reading for what is essentially a meticulous reference book." She praises its index and detailed timeline, thorough assemblage of facts and figures, combined with a light tone.

Susan Austin, writing in GreenLeft, describes Buckman's section on national parks as "a little dry and detailed" but approves the way that, throughout the book, "time and time again Buckman exposes the 'development at all costs' attitudes of present and past state and federal governments".

== Use in education ==
The book is used for teaching Environmental Studies in Victoria, Australia, and in Washington State University, Vancouver's history program.

== See also ==
- Franklin Dam controversy
- Tasmanian Wilderness Society
- List of Australian environmental books
