= Leonie Joubert =

South African science writer

- Citizenship: South Africa
- Education: Stellenbosch University; Rhodes University
- Occupations: Science writer and author.
- Notable work: Scorched: South Africa's Changing Climate; Boiling Point: People in a Changing Climate
- Awards: Ruth First Fellow (2007); SAB Environmental Journalist of the Year, print media category (2009); Honorary Sunday Times Alan Paton Nonfiction Award

Leonie Joubert is a South African science writer and author specialising in climate and environmental collapse, energy policy, and why cities leave us hungry, heavy, and sick (the hunger-obesity poverty-paradox). More recently, her work delves into the realm of public mental health. She has spent the better part of 20 years exploring these topics through books, journalism, communication support to academics and civil society organisations, non-fiction creative writing, and podcasting.

== Biography ==
Leonie Joubert has a Master's degree in science journalism from Stellenbosch University and a Bachelor's in journalism and media studies from Rhodes University. She is an author of more than ten books, including: Scorched: South Africa's Changing Climate (Wits University Press, 2006); Boiling Point: People in a Changing Climate (Wits University Press, 2008); Invaded: The Biological Invasion of South Africa (Wits University Press, 2009) and The Hungry Season: Feeding South Africa's Cities (Picador Africa, 2012).

Her first book, Scorched: South Africa's Changing Climate, blends the facts of climate change "with humour, history, vivid descriptions of people" and delivers it with "an amazing personal sense of wonder". Her second book, Invaded: The Biological Invasion of South Africa's Cities, documents the consequences of the introduction of invasive alien plant and animals species into South Africa. The Hungry Season: Feeding Southern Africa's Cities, is an exploration of hunger and malnutrition in southern Africa.

== Awards ==
Joubert was awarded two honorary Sunday Times Alan Paton Non-Fiction Awards, one for Scorched in 2007 and the other for Invaded in 2010. Alan Paton Award.

Joubert was the 2007 Ruth First Fellow (University of the Witwatersrand), the 2009 SAB Environmental Journalist of the Year in the print media category, was listed in the Mail & Guardian's 200 Young South Africans You Must Take to Lunch (2008), and was shortlisted for the 2016 City Press Tafelberg Nonfiction Award.
