= Green to Gold (book) =

2006 book by Daniel C. Esty and Andrew S. Winston

Green to Gold: How Smart Companies Use Environmental Strategy to Innovate, Create Value, and Build Competitive Advantage
- Author: Daniel C. Esty, Andrew S. Winston
- Genre: Non-fiction
- Publisher: Yale University Press
- Publication date: 2006

Green to Gold: How Smart Companies Use Environmental Strategy to Innovate, Create Value, and Build Competitive Advantage is a 2006 book on sustainability by Daniel C. Esty and Andrew S. Winston and published by Yale University Press.

The book argues that pollution control and natural resource management have become critical elements of marketplace success and explains how leading-edge companies have folded environmental thinking into their core business strategies.
