= Robert Brulle =

American sociologist

Robert Joseph Brulle
- Education: United States Coast Guard Academy, New School for Social Research, University of Michigan, George Washington University
- Scientific career
- Fields: Environmental sociology
- Workplaces: Drexel University
- Thesis: Agency, democracy, and the environment: an examination of U.S. environmental movement organizations from the perspective of critical theory (1995)

Robert Joseph Brulle is an American environmental sociologist and professor of sociology and environmental science at Drexel University. He is also an associate professor of public health at the Drexel University School of Public Health. He advocates aggressive political action to address global warming.

== Education and academic career ==
Brulle received his B.S. from United States Coast Guard Academy in 1974, his M.A. in sociology from the New School for Social Research in 1981, his M.S. from the University of Michigan in natural resources in 1982, and his PhD from George Washington University in sociology in 1995. Brulle joined the faculty of Drexel University as an assistant professor in 1997. He became an associate professor there in 2003 and a full professor in 2008. Brulle is a faculty member of the Department of Culture and Communication of the College of Arts and Sciences at Drexel.

== Research ==
Brulle's research includes the strategy and funding patterns of what he calls “the climate change countermovement,” the movement critical of action to address global warming. Brulle was interviewed by Frontline, a public television program that produces and broadcasts in-depth documentaries, for their 2012 documentary on climate change denial titled Climate of Doubt. He described the climate change countermovement as "comprehensive" and as "an add-on to the already-existing conservative movement in the United States." Brulle estimated the total annual income of the nonprofit environmental movement as $2.7 billion, and noted that progress toward a cleaner US environment often comes at the expense of other nations, in a 2009 interview by the Imaginova Corporation published by Fox News.

Brulle analysed the funding of organizations associated with the climate change denial movement during a year-long fellowship at the Center for Advanced Study in the Behavioral Sciences at Stanford University. Brulle published results in December 2013 in Climatic Change, a monthly peer-reviewed scientific journal. According to Brulle, it was "the first peer-reviewed, comprehensive analysis ever conducted of the funding behind climate change denial." Brulle's study estimated that the 91 organizations he examined had a total annual income of just above $900 million, and that the vast majority of funds donated to such organizations came from conservative foundations. Over the eight years covered by the study (2003–2010), the American Enterprise Institute received the most funding—16% of the total funds, and the donor-advised funds Donors Trust and Donors Capital Fund were the largest funders. The study also found that the amount of money donated to these organizations by means of Donors Trust and other foundations whose funding sources cannot be traced has risen dramatically over the previous five years.

The report was covered by the Washington Post, Forbes, Scientific American, The Guardian, Science Daily, and the International Science Times. The research was featured in the public information website on climate change from the Governor of California's Office of Planning and Research. A senior fellow from the Heartland Institute, one of the organizations included in the study, writing in an opinion piece in Forbes, criticized Brulle's work and its media coverage on a number of points, including that the organizations included in the study had diverse agendas, and not all of their revenue was devoted to climate change education. Bruelle acknowledged in the PBS interview, “You can’t say how many dollars went from this foundation to this organization specifically for climate change. . . .”

Brulle collaborated on research into factors affecting US public opinion on climate change, and found that politicians are more influential than scientists. The research was featured by National Geographic and USA Today.

== Political activity ==
Brulle endorsed Bernie Sanders in the 2016 US presidential election.

== Books ==
- Agency, Democracy, and Nature: The U.S. Environmental Movement from a Critical Theory Perspective (MIT Press, 2000)
- Power, Justice, and the Environment: A Critical Appraisal of the Environmental Justice Movement (MIT Press, 2005; edited by Brulle and David Naguib Pellow)
