= Orb Energy =

Indian solar energy company

- Type: Private Limited
- Industry: Photovoltaics, Solar Power
- Founded: 2006
- Founder: Damian Miller and NP Ramesh
- Headquarters: Bangalore, India
- Area served: India, Kenya
- Key people: Damian Miller (CEO); NP Ramesh (COO); Herre Hoekstra (Chairman)
- Number of employees: 250 (2019)
- Website: www.orbenergy.com

Orb Energy is a solar energy company headquartered in Bangalore, India, founded in 2006 by Damian Miller and NP Ramesh. The company manufactures solar panels and provides comprehensive solar energy services, including installation and financing options for residential, commercial, and industrial customers. Orb Energy also operates in Kenya, replicating its Indian business model to serve the African market.

According to a report by JMK Research, Orb Energy is among the top three rooftop solar companies in India.

== History ==
Orb Energy commenced operations in 2006, opening its first branch in Kumta, India. By 2015, the company had expanded to over 100 branches across Karnataka. In 2014, Orb Energy launched a subsidiary in Kenya to extend its services to the African rooftop solar sector. The company reached 100 branches in Karnataka by 2015.

Orb Energy is an ALMM-enlisted manufacturer of solar panels as per the Approved List of Models and Manufacturers (ALMM) in India. The company has an in-house solar panel manufacturing facility located in Bangalore.

In 2016, Orb Energy initiated an in-house financing scheme for small and medium enterprises (SMEs) to invest in rooftop solar photovoltaic solutions. This in-house finance platform is intended to address financial barriers faced by SMEs in adopting solar energy.

Orb Energy has reached ₹300 crore in finance for SME solar adoption as of January 2025. This recognition highlights its zero-collateral solar financing solutions, helping more businesses switch to green energy. SMEs in India have adopted rooftop solar faster due to the company's financing methodology.

In May 2024, Orb Energy inaugurated its first 35 MW (DC) ground-mounted solar park in Arsikere, Karnataka. Spanning 110 acres, the facility is expected to generate 5.24 crore units of electricity annually, significantly reducing carbon dioxide emissions by approximately 45,000 tons per year.

As of January 2025, Orb Energy has deployed approximately 350 MW of solar photovoltaic installations across India, with a direct presence in the southern and western regions of the country.

=== Funding ===
- In June 2011, Orb Energy raised $1.1 million from Acumen Fund to expand rural solar lighting, scale manufacturing, and develop products.
- In July 2018, the company secured $15 million in equity and debt financing from the Netherlands Development Finance Company (FMO) and the Overseas Private Investment Corporation (OPIC) (Mercom).
- In October 2019, Shell acquired an almost 20% stake in Orb Energy, supporting Shell's initiative to provide reliable electricity to 100 million people in developing countries by 2030.
- In October 2022, Orb Energy obtained a $20 million loan from the United States International Development Finance Corporation (DFC) to support Orb's in-house financing program for rooftop and ground-mounted solar installations, particularly benefiting SMEs.
- In September 2024, Orb Energy has started its Series D fundraising, aiming to raise $48 million to further expand its solar energy solutions.

=== International Operations ===
In 2014, Orb Energy expanded its operations to Africa by launching a subsidiary in Kenya.

Over recent years, the company started to address the needs of commercial and industrial clients with larger solar systems offering higher power generation capacities.

In September 2025, Orb Energy delivered a 2.9 MW rooftop solar project to Mabati Rolling Mills (MRM) help to accelerate Kenya's Green Transition.

== Awards and recognition ==
- January 2012: Awarded first runner-up in the SME & NGO category of the Zayed Future Energy Prize, receiving a prize of US$1 million.
- April 2021: Received the 'Best C&I Project (Rooftop)' at the Mercom India Solar Awards for its 3 MW rooftop solar installation in Karnataka for Klene Paks Limited. The project features over 9,000 solar panels and includes a remote monitoring system to enhance electricity consumption efficiency.
