= Sakiko Fukuda-Parr =

Japanese economist

- サキコ・フクダ・パー; 福田 咲子
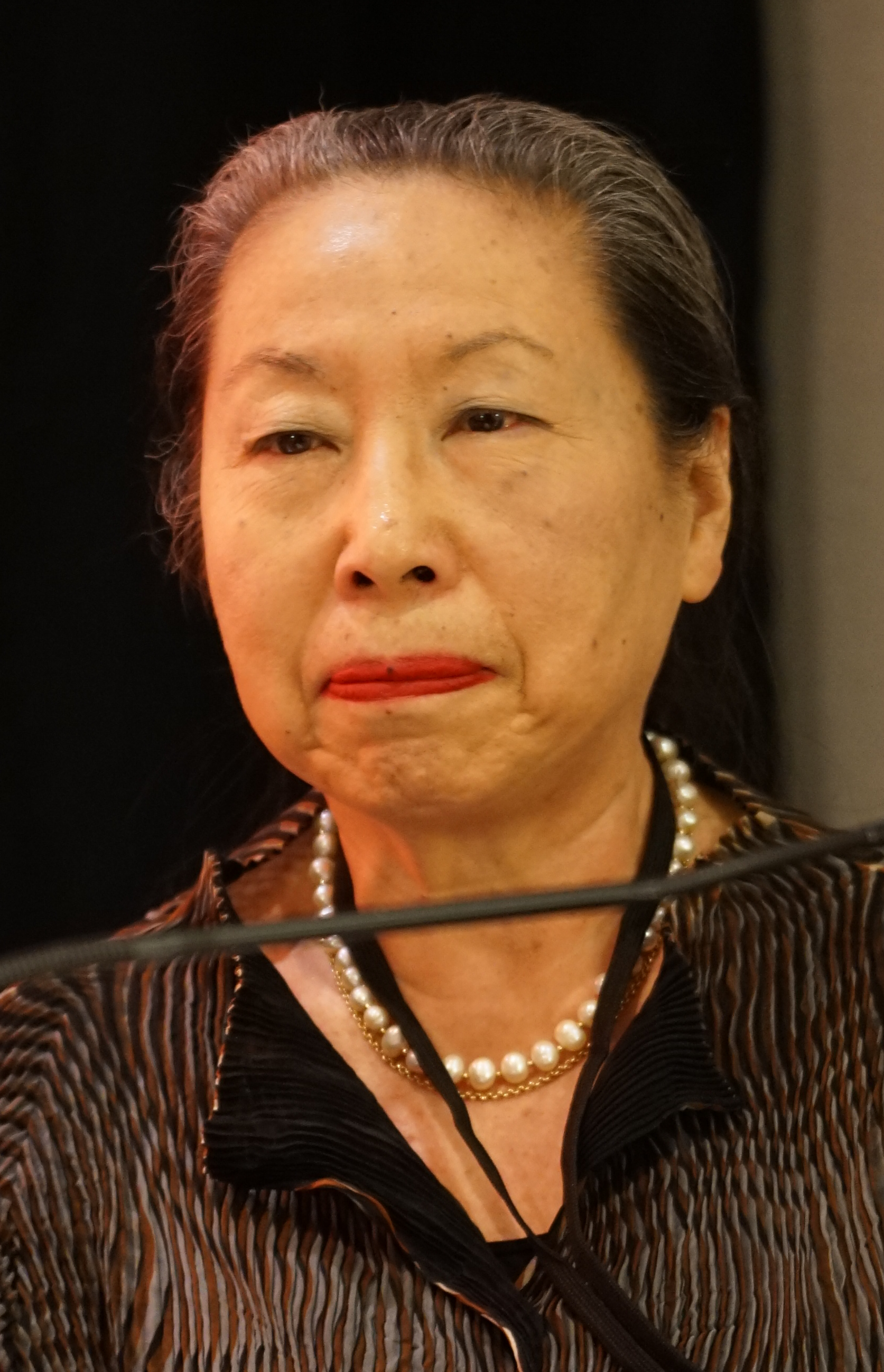
- Fukuda-Parr at ASSA 2026
- Born: 1950 (age 75–76); Tokyo, Japan
- Spouse: Francis Parr

Academic background
- Education: University of Sussex

Academic work
- Discipline: Development economics
- Institutions: The New School, New York, US
- Website: sakikofukudaparr.net; Information at IDEAS / RePEc

Sakiko Fukuda-Parr (サキコ・フクダ・パー、福田 咲子) (born 1950) is a development economist, a Professor of International Affairs at the New School for Social Research in New York, and the Vice Chair of the UN Committee for Development Policy. She has gained recognition for her work with the United Nations Development Programme (UNDP), her writing on human rights and development, and for founding the Journal of Human Development and Capabilities. She was the principal author of the UN Human Development Reports (1995-2004).

== Education ==
Fukuda-Parr holds a BA (Hons) degree from the University of Cambridge, an MA in economics from the University of Sussex, and both an MA and MALD (master of arts in law and diplomacy) from the Fletcher School of Law and Diplomacy at Tufts University.

== Career ==
After working as a loan officer with the World Bank from 1974 to 1979, Fukuda-Parr served as a technical adviser in agricultural economics at the United Nations Development Programme from 1979 to 1985. She followed this up with stints as a Deputy Resident Adviser in Burundi (1985-1987), Principal Economist and Deputy Director at the Regional Bureau for Africa (1986-1991), and Chief of the West Africa Division (1992-1994). In 1995 she was appointed as Director of the Human Development Report Office (1995-2006), where she was responsible for authoring and publishing the UN Human Development Reports.

Since leaving UNDP, Fukuda-Parr has worked as a professor at the School of International and Public Affairs at Columbia University. She has held research positions at the Belfer Center of the Kennedy School of Government at Harvard University and The Graduate Program in International Affairs at The New School.

In November 2016, Fukuda-Parr was appointed by United Nations Secretary-General Ban Ki-moon to the High-Level Panel on Access to Medicines co-chaired by Ruth Dreifuss (former President of Switzerland) and Festus Mogae (former President of Botswana). She also serves on the advisory board for Academics Stand Against Poverty (ASAP) and on the University of Oslo/The Lancet Independent Panel on Global Governance for Health.

== Writer and editor ==
Fukuda-Parr has both written and edited works on human development, poverty, and economics. In addition to her contributions to the Annual Human Development Reports, some of her authored and edited publications include Rethinking Technical Cooperation: Reforms for Capacity Building in Africa, Capacity for Development: New Solutions to Old Problems and The Gene Revolution: GM Crops and Unequal Development. She has also participated in several journal projects and written book chapters concerning capacity development and human rights. In 2000, she founded the Journal of Human Development (published annually). She has also co-edited Readings in Human Development: Concepts, Measures and Policies for a Development Paradigm, and held a position on the Feminist Economics editorial board.

In her writings, FukudaParr highlights social disparities on an international scale. Inequalities, according to her, exist in education, resource distribution, gender rights, and income. Her role in the Millennium Development Goals, among other initiatives, is making a difference in the wars on poverty and inequality. Toward this end, she will continue to fight for an outcome that embodies true human rights on every level.

In The Adventure of Peace, Fukuda-Parr’s chapter, "Poverty and Inequality – Challenges in the Era of Globalisation," describes the central challenge intrinsically dividing society: the direction of globalization. She urges nations to redirect globalization so that it benefits all countries and all peoples, to promote democratization as a force for greater social justice and to address poverty as part of the agenda for collective security. Critical issues (such as HIV/AIDS, migration, links between development and conflict, cultural diversity, and global governance) can be more appropriately tackled with global solidarity and an “inclusive form” of globalization.

== Personal life ==
Fukuda-Parr was born in Tokyo, Japan. Her father's position with the Japanese Ministry of Finance moved the family from Tokyo to London to Washington, D.C. and, finally, to Manila. She is married to Francis Parr. They have two children, Nicholas and Henry. She currently resides on the Upper West Side of Manhattan.

== Recognition ==
She is a joint winner of the 2019 Grawemeyer Award, alongside Terra Lawson-Remer and Susan Randolph for "Ideas for Improving World Order". She is also the winner of the American Political Science Association’s 2016 Best Book in Human Rights Scholarship.

== Selected bibliography ==
=== Books ===
- Berg, Elliot (1993). Rethinking technical cooperation: reforms for capacity building in Africa. New York, N.Y: United Nations Development Programme. ISBN 9789211260229.
- Fukuda-Parr, Sakiko; Lopes, Carlos; Malik, Khalid (2002). Capacity for development new solutions to old problems. Sterling, Va: Earthscan Publications. ISBN 9781853839245.
- Fukuda-Parr, Sakiko; Chen, Lincoln; Seidensticker, Ellen (2003). Human insecurity in a global world. Cambridge, Mass: Global Equity Initiative, Asia Center Harvard University Distributed by Harvard University Press. ISBN 9780674014541.
- Fukuda-Parr, Sakiko; Kumar, A. K. Shiva (2004). Readings in human development: concepts, measures and policies for a development paradigm. New Delhi New York: Oxford University Press. ISBN 9780195670523.
- Fukuda-Parr, Sakiko (2007). The gene revolution GM crops and unequal development. London Sterlling, VA: Earthscan. ISBN 9781844074105.

=== Chapters in books ===
- Fukuda-Parr, Sakiko (2005), "Poverty and inequality: challenges in the era of globalisation", in Ask, Sten; Mark-Jungkvist, Anna (eds.), The adventure of peace: Dag Hammarskjöld and the future of the UN, New York: Palgrave Macmillan, pp. 220–239, ISBN 9781403974310
- Fukuda-Parr, Sakiko (2009), "Human rights and human development", in Kanbur, Ravi; Basu, Kaushik (eds.), Arguments for a better world: essays in honor of Amartya Sen | Volume II: Society, institutions and development, Oxford New York: Oxford University Press, pp. 76–99, ISBN 9780199239979.

=== Journals ===
- Fukuda-Parr, Sakiko (January 1999). "What does feminization of poverty mean? It isn't just lack of income". Feminist Economics. 5 (2): 99–103. doi:10.1080/135457099337996.
- Fukuda-Parr, Sakiko (January 2003). "The human development paradigm: Operationalizing Sen's ideas on capabilities". Feminist Economics. 9 (2–3): 301–317. doi:10.1080/1354570022000077980. S2CID 18178004.
- Fukuda-Parr, Sakiko (2006). "Guest editor: Sakiko Fukuda-Parr". International Journal of Technology and Globalisation. 2 (1–2). Inderscience Publishers: 1–216.
- Fukuda-Parr, Sakiko (2006). "Introduction: Global actors, markets and rules driving the diffusion of genetically modified (GM) crops in developing countries". International Journal of Technology and Globalisation. 2 (1–2): 1–11. doi:10.1504/IJTG.2006.009123.

=== Human Development Reports ===
- Human Development Reports 1995-2004 – lead author, with Sir Richard Jolly (1996–99); lead author (2000-04)
- Human Development Report 2004: Cultural Liberty in Today’s Diverse World.
- Human Development Report 2003: The Millennium Development Goals, a Compact among Nations to end Human Poverty.
- Human Development Report 2002: Deepening Democracy in a Fragmented World.
- Human Development Report 2001: Making New Technologies Work for Human Development.
- Human Development Report 2000: Human Rights and Human Development.
- Human Development Report 1999: Globalization with a Human Face.
- Human Development Report 1998: Consumption and Human Development.
- Human Development Report 1997: Human Development to Eradicate Poverty.
- Human Development Report 1996: Human Development and Economic Growth.

== See also ==
- International Association for Feminist Economics
- Feminist economics
- Feminist Economics - journal
- List of feminist economists
