= Verity Burgmann =

Australian academic and activist

Verity Burgmann FASSA
- Born: Verity Nancy Burgmann; 17 September 1952 (age 74); Sydney, New South Wales, Australia
- Occupations: Academic; Author
- Spouse: Andrew Milner (m. 1977)
- Children: 3
- Parents: Victor Burgmann; Lorna Bradbury
- Relatives: Meredith (sister); Ernest (grandfather); Charles (nephew); Verity (niece)

Academic background
- Education: London School of Economics (BSc); Australian National University (PhD)
- Thesis: Revolutionaries and Racists: Australian Socialism and the Problem of Racism, 1887–1917 (1980)

Academic work
- Discipline: Social science, political criticism, political science
- Institutions: South London College; University of New South Wales; University of Sydney; University of Melbourne; Monash University
- Notable works: Power, Profit and Protest
- Website: reasoninrevolt.net.au

Verity Nancy Burgmann FASSA (born 17 September 1952) is an Australian academic and activist. She is an Adjunct Professor of Politics in the School of Social Sciences at Monash University and Honorary Professorial Fellow in the eScholarship Research Centre at the University of Melbourne, where she is Director of the Reason in Revolt website. In 2013, she was Ludwig Hirschfeld Mack Visiting Professor of Australian Studies in the Institut für Englische Philologie at the Freie Universität Berlin.

== Early life and education ==
Burgmann was born in Sydney, Australia, the daughter of Victor Burgmann and Lorna Bradbury. In 1971 she left home to attend the London School of Economics, where she completed a BSc (Econ) with a major in politics. In 1980 she completed her PhD, Revolutionaries and Racists: Australian Socialism and the Problem of Racism, at the Australian National University.

== Career and research ==
During the 1970s, Burgmann became actively involved in 'radical' politics, most notably the anti-apartheid campaign, and the campaign for aboriginal land rights. In 1971, along with her sister Meredith, she was ejected from the Sydney Cricket Ground after disrupting play during the controversial 1971 South Africa rugby union tour of Australia. Burgmann's activism continued during her time in the United Kingdom, where she devoted her efforts to the International Socialists and the Socialist Workers Party (Britain).

She lived with Peter Hain, who was then leading the STST (Stop The Seventy Tour) campaign in Britain against the visits of racially selected sporting teams from South Africa. After moving to Melbourne in the early 1980s, she became involved in People for Nuclear Disarmament. During the 1990 federal election campaign, opposition leader Andrew Peacock visited her sons' creche for a photo opportunity where Burgmann greeted him with her middle son on her hip, holding a children's blackboard reading: "I don't want Mr Peacock to kiss my baby." The focus of Burgmann's recent activism has been the defence of public education (she is on the executive of the Public Education Group) and trade unionism.

Verity Burgmann married Andrew Milner, the British-Australian cultural theorist and literary critic, in 1977. They have three sons.

Verity Burgmann began her academic career teaching British Government at South London College in 1975. Between 1978 and 1980 Burgmann worked at both the University of New South Wales and the University of Sydney, before moving to the Political Science Department at the University of Melbourne in 1981. In 2003, she was appointed Professor of Political Science. Burgmann was Deputy Dean of the Arts faculty at the University of Melbourne between 2004 and 2006. She retired in 2013, taught in Berlin for a semester and was then appointed adjunct professor at Monash University.

She was elected a Fellow of the Academy of the Social Sciences in Australia in 1999.

Burgmann's research interests are the history and politics of the Australian labour movement, radical political ideologies, contemporary protest movements, environmental politics, racism, anti-globalization and anti-corporate politics. She has established a significant reputation both as a labour historian and as a political scientist of social movements and social change.

== Selected works ==
=== Writings ===
- (with Meredith Burgmann) Green Bans, Red Union: The Saving of a City, 2nd edition, University of New South Wales Press, Sydney, 2017.
- Globalization and Labour in the Twenty-First Century, Routledge, London and New York, 2016.
- (with Hans A. Baer) Climate Politics and the Climate Movement in Australia, Melbourne University Press, Melbourne, 2012.
- Power, Profit & Protest: Australian Social Movements and Globalisation, Allen & Unwin, Sydney, 2003.
- (with Meredith Burgmann) Green Bans, Red Union: Environmental Activism and the New South Wales Builders Labourers' Federation, University of NSW Press, Sydney, 1998.
- Revolutionary Industrial Unionism. The Industrial Workers of the World in Australia, Cambridge University Press, Melbourne, 1995.
- Power and Protest. Movements for Change in Australian Society, Allen & Unwin, Sydney, 1993.
- In Our Time: Socialism and the Rise of Labor, 1885-1905, Allen & Unwin, Sydney, 1985.

=== Edited works ===
- Andrew Milner, Simon Sellars and Verity Burgmann, Changing the Climate: Utopia, Dystopia and Catastrophe, Arena Publications, Melbourne, 2011.
- Verity Burgmann and Jenny Lee, Staining the Wattle: A People's History of Australia since 1788, McPhee Gribble/Penguin, Melbourne, 1988.
- Verity Burgmann and Jenny Lee, Constructing a Culture: A People's History of Australia since 1788, McPhee Gribble/Penguin, Melbourne, 1988.
- Verity Burgmann and Jenny Lee, Making a Life: A People's History of Australia since 1788, McPhee Gribble/Penguin, Melbourne, 1988.
- Verity Burgmann and Jenny Lee, A Most Valuable Acquisition: A People's History of Australia since 1788, McPhee Gribble/Penguin, Melbourne, 1988.
