= Bullionism =

Economic theory that defines wealth by the amount of precious metals owned

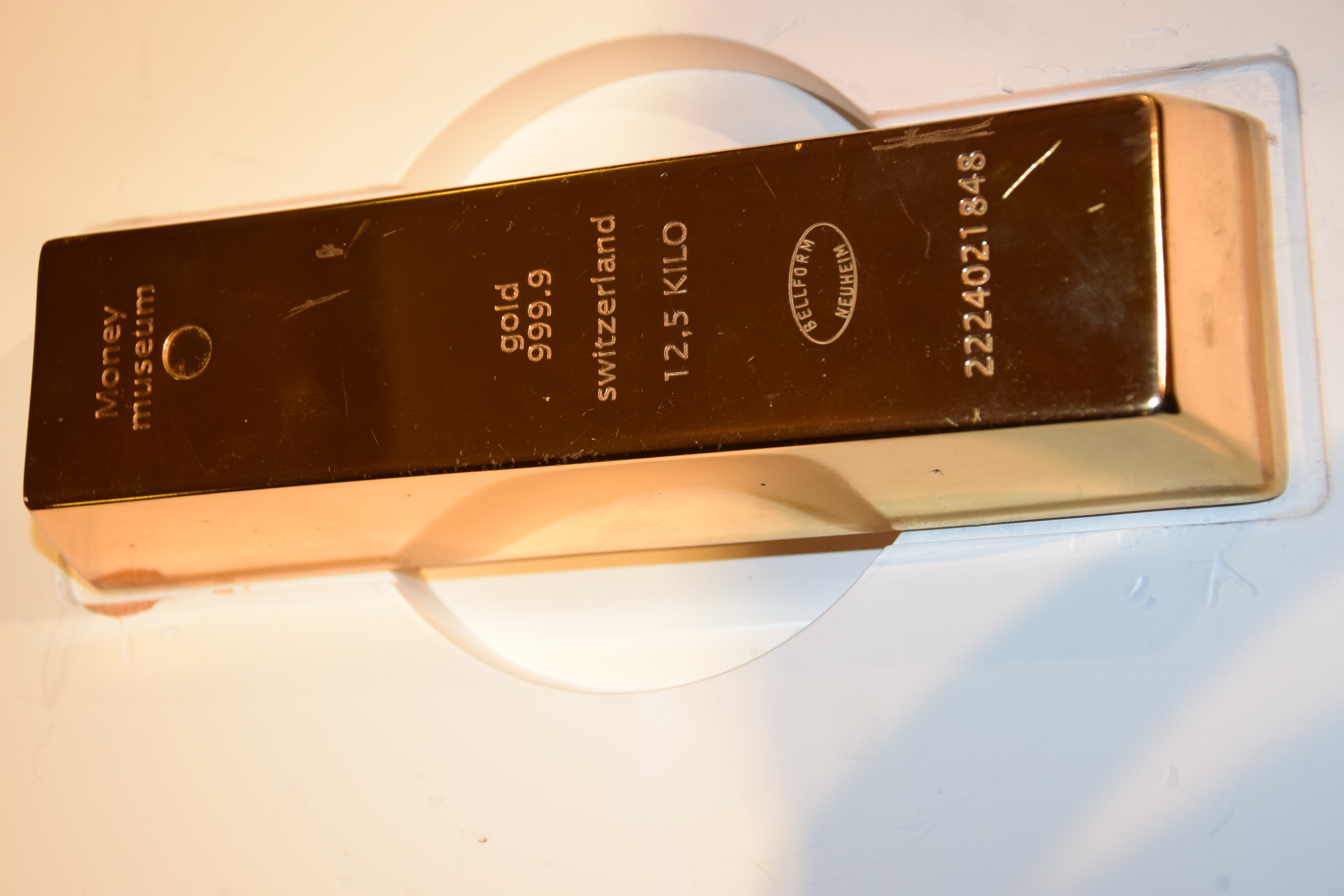
A bullion gold bar at the Swiss Money Museum

Bullionism is an economic theory that defines wealth by the amount of precious metals owned. Bullionism is an early and perhaps more primitive form of mercantilism. It was derived, during the 16th century, from the observation that the Kingdom of England, because of its large trade surplus, possessed large amounts of gold and silver—bullion—despite the fact that there was not any mining of precious metals in England.

== History ==
Bullionism was born in what now is known as Spain. Following the Reconquista, the region fell victim to a deep economic slump. This prompted local scientists to look for ways to revive the region's economy. Some noted that England had accumulated vast reserves of gold and silver thanks to its trade surplus, and established a link between the possession of precious metals and the wealth of the country.

Although the supporters of Bullionism did not write theoretical treatises on the subject (unlike the precursors of the classical school in the following century), they did mobilize many leaders. In 1558, Ortiz wrote a memoir to the king to prevent the exits of gold. The doctrine was developing mainly in this region, because the influx of precious metals from America led to a sharp increase in purchasing power in the short term, which the authors saw as an implicit confirmation of their theory. King Charles V of latter Spain and his son King Philip II did follow the bullionist recommendations.

== Examples of bullionists ==
Thomas Milles (1550–1627) and others recommended that England increase exports to create a trade surplus, convert the surplus into precious metals, and hinder the drain of money and precious metal to other countries. England did restrict exportation of money or precious metals around 1600, but Milles wanted to resume using staple ports (ports where incoming foreign merchants were required to offer their goods for sale before anywhere else) to force merchants from abroad to use their assets to buy English goods and prevent them from transferring gold or silver from England homewards. Milles's opinions, however, were not widely valued. One of his contemporaries wrote, "Milles was so much out of step with the time that his pamphlets had little influence."

Gerard de Malynes (1586–1641), another bullionist, published a book named A Treatise of the Canker of England's Common Wealth, that asserted that the exchange of foreign currency had been a trade of value rather than exchanging the weight of metals. Therefore, the unfair exchanging of precious metals by bankers and money changers would cause a deficit in the English balance of trade. To ban the flow of exchange rates, he demanded the strict fixing of exchange rates for coins, only by the concentration of precious metals and weights, and for strict regulation and monitoring of foreign trade. He failed, however, to convince his contemporaries “...that the cambists were responsible for gold outflow or to elicit enthusiasm for a monopoly sale of exchange, par pro pari, by the royal exchanger." He did succeed in creating one of the first economic controversies, and Edward Misselden opposed him in 1623 in his book The Circle of Commerce: Or, the Balance of Trade.

== See also ==
- Commodity money
- Gold standard
- Bimetallism
- Metallism
- Monetary policy
- Monetary economics
- Silverite
- John Law (economist)
