= Thomas Mun =

English economist (1571–1641)

Sir Thomas Mun
- Born: 17 June 1571; London, England
- Died: 21 July 1641 (aged 70); London, England

Academic work
- Discipline: International trade
- School or tradition: Mercantilists
- Notable ideas: English economic policy

Sir Thomas Mun (/mʌn/; 17 June 1571 – 21 July 1641) was an English writer on economics and is often referred to as the last of the early mercantilists. Most notably, he is known for serving as the director of the East India Company. Due to his strong belief in the state and his prior experience as a merchant, Mun took on a prominent role during the economic depression which began in 1620. To defend the East India Company and to regain England's economic stability, Mun published A Discourse of Trade from England unto the East-Indies.

Through mercantilist principles, Mun created a proposed set of "means to enrich a kingdom" which centred on ensuring that exports exceeded imports. In other words, Mun advocated for achieving a positive balance of trade which would cause England's wealth to steadily increase. He is an influential thinker in the history of economic theory.

== Life and background ==
Thomas Mun was born in June 1571. He was the third child of a substantial London family based in the vicinity of St Andrew Hubbard, where he was baptised on 17 June 1571. His father, John Mun, and his stepfather both earned their livings as mercers. His grandfather, also named John Mun, was provost of moneyers in the Royal Mint of England. Through his family ties It can be assumed that Thomas gained insight into matters pertaining to currency and to the economy as a whole. At the age of forty-one, Thomas married Ursula Malcott and together they had three children: John, Ann and Mary. They chose the parish of St Helen Bishopsgate as their home.

Nothing is known about his education, but Thomas's own career as a merchant started around 1596 where he was a member of the Mercers' company and engaged in Mediterranean trade, especially with Italy and the Middle East. He was successful as a practising merchant and was able to amass a large fortune. In 1615, due to his prosperity, Mun was elected as the director of the East India Company and in 1622 was appointed as a member of the standing commission on trade. The rest of his professional career was spent advocating for and promoting the East India Company's interests.

== Director of the East India Company ==
In conjunction with the British Crown, The East India Company was a trading business established to colonise new lands and to pursue trade with the East Indies. In 1615 Mun was elected as the director of the company and set out to ensure that it was operating at full capacity. To achieve this meant that wealth would be maximised and exports would be increased. In 1620, during the onset of the depression, Mun's role within the economy was greatly enhanced. He was forced to not only defend the East India Company and its practices, but also aid the government in correcting the economy.

The trade crisis that eventually led to the depression stemmed from two separate events. First, through the East India Company, England was importing from India at a much higher rate than it was exporting. This negative balance of trade, or trade deficit, meant that England was sending out more money than it was bringing in, a clear detriment to the economy according to the principles of mercantilism. Second, to pay for all of their imports, England sent precious metals to India. As the only real determinant of affluence in the 1600s, due to the fact that paper money was not yet in use in Northern Europe, exporting precious metals was generally unheard of. For the East India Company, however, the exportation restrictions on bullion were reduced. Due to this stipulation, the exchange of silver for luxuries brought a lot of negative attention to the East India Company; citizens believed that it was a large factor in the economic downturn. Mun was thus put forward as a representative of the enterprise. His task was to clear the name of his company while also convincing his clients, and the general public, that the actions taken were ultimately for the best. He conveyed his views through his first published book, A Discourse of Trade from England Unto the East Indies.

== Economic policies ==
According to Mun, foreign trade was the best way to increase the wealth of a nation. More specifically, it was necessary for exports to exceed imports. All other corrective economic policies were secondary. As he says in England's Treasure by Foreign Trade, we must "sell more to strangers yearly than we consume of theirs in value." To achieve this positive balance of trade, Mun laid out a list of criterion which he urged England to follow

- Imported goods that can be produced domestically should be banned.
- Reduce luxurious imported goods by making Englishmen have a taste for English goods.
- Reduce export duties on goods produced domestically for foreign markets.
- If no alternatives are available to its neighbours, England should charge more money for its exports.
- Cultivate wasteland for higher production and to reduce the amount of imports needed from abroad.
- Shipping should be completed solely on English vessels.

== Publications ==
- A Discourse of Trade from England Unto the East Indies (1621)
- England's Treasure by Foreign Trade (1628)

=== A Discourse of Trade from England Unto the East Indies ===
Mun's 1621 work, A Discourse of Trade from England unto the East Indies, is in a large part a defence of company ethics. Due to the East India Company's practice of exporting silver, the general consensus swung against the company; they were in danger of losing their trade monopoly. The book was authored in an attempt to answer the charge that the East India Company was responsible for the shortage of silver and, thus, the depression. It is said that Mun vehemently and convincingly argued that the loss of precious metals was, in itself, not a detriment to the economy. Mun contended that, indirectly, the practices of the East India Company actually benefitted the economy. Not only did some of the imported goods produce a greater profit when re-exported (mostly to the Continent), but the growth of the shipping industry and the employment of dock workers was greatly increased.

Ultimately, Mun was successful in his attempt to salvage the name of the East India Company and alleviated the pressure from its biggest attackers. His brilliant defence was one of the main reasons as to why he was appointed to be a member of the Standing Commission on Trade in 1622. Mun's main task on the committee was to provide recommendations to the government in regard to British economic policy.

=== England's Treasure by Foreign Trade ===
While Mun's first publication earned him a strong reputation and high acclaim, it was ultimately his second authorship for which he is most well known. While serving as a member of the Privy Council committee of inquiry, Mun took a broader view of the economy as a whole and wrote England's Treasure by Forraign Trade or the Balance of Forraign Trade is the Rule of Our Treasure. Although most likely written sometime between 1620–1630, the book was not published for the public until 1664, when it was "published for the Common good by his son John," and dedicated to the Earl of Southampton, lord high treasurer.

Influenced by his work as a merchant and his time spent as the director of the East India Company, the book covers a wide array of topics. Most notably, however, England's Treasure is considered to be a direct repudiation of arguments made in regards to foreign trade by Gerard de Malynes and Edward Misselden. Mun was opposed to a fixed exchange rate, as proposed by Malynes, and saw it as more of an impairment than a benefit to the economy. In the book we also find the first notion of Mun's theory of the balance of trade. It should be the focus of English policy, argued Mun, to export at a higher rate than it imports from abroad. In doing so, the wealth of the country will inevitably increase.

The publication, however, was not as optimistic as it is widely perceived it to be. A large portion of the book is spent chastising the British for being too unlike the Dutch. A strong work ethic, a restraint from conspicuous consumption, and a vigorous trade regiment are all qualities which led to the overall prosperity of the Dutch. They are also qualities, Mun contends, that the British did not possess.

== See also ==
- Mercantilism
- East India Company
- Balance of trade
- Bullionism
- History of economic thought
- Privy Council of the United Kingdom

== Sources ==
- This article incorporates text from a publication now in the public domain: "Mun, Thomas". Dictionary of National Biography. London: Smith, Elder & Co. 1885–1900.
