= Appalt =

The Appalt was involved in the leasing of state revenue, legal monopolies, crown lands, Droit de régale and indirectly charges of any kind in Habsburg Austria during the Baroque period. The Appalt is thus closely related to the financial politics of Mercantilism.

This type of concession was later renewed, later known as the Afterappalt.

The word has an Italian origin, where appalto means 'assignment', 'job posting' and 'concession'.

== Function and role ==
In Habsburg Austria, the Appalt formed part of a broader system of fiscal administration in which the state delegated the collection of revenues and the operation of monopolies to private contractors. These arrangements were especially prominent in the sphere of indirect taxation, including customs duties, consumption taxes, tobacco, and salt revenues. Such taxes constituted a substantial portion of state income in the eighteenth century.

Under this system, contractors advanced fixed sums to the state in exchange for the right to collect specified revenues, often retaining any surplus as profit. While this arrangement provided the monarchy with predictable income, it also introduced inefficiencies, inconsistencies, and opportunities for abuse, as the central government lacked precise oversight of actual receipts.

The limitations of such decentralized fiscal practices became increasingly apparent during the reign of Emperor Joseph II. From 1782, Count Karl von Zinzendorf introduced a centralized system of accounting designed to bring all revenues and expenditures of the monarchy into a unified framework. This “new accountancy” sought to replace fragmented and opaque arrangements, including tax farming and related concessions, with more systematic and transparent financial administration.

== See also ==
- Commissioners for Trade and Plantations
- Consolidated Fund
- Customs and Excise Act 1787

== Bibliography ==
- Dickson, P. G. M. (2007). "Count Karl von Zinzendorf's 'New Accountancy': the Structure of Austrian Government Finance in Peace and War, 1781–1791". The International History Review. 29 (1): 22–56. ISSN 0707-5332.
