= Karl von Zinzendorf =

Austrian politician (1739–1813)

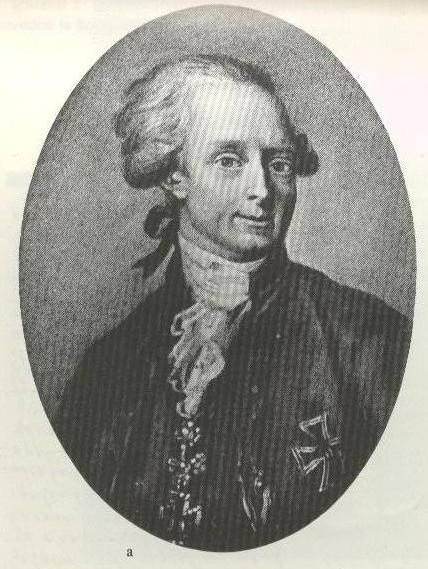
Karl von Zinzendorf (engraving in the Austrian National Library)

Count Karl von Zinzendorf und Pottendorf (5 January 1739 – 5 January 1813) was a Saxon-Austrian civil servant. He served the government of Austria in a variety of capacities, including as governor of Trieste, and rose to high rank at the Habsburg court.

His massive diary, written daily over a period of about 66 years, is an important historical documentary source for his era, both in politics and in the arts.

== Early life and education ==
Zinzendorf was born in Dresden in 1739 as son of Count Friedrich Christian von Zinzendorf und Pottendorf (1697-1756) and his wife, Countess Christiane Sophie von Callenberg (1702-1775). His family was originally from Austria; they had emigrated in 1660 to Protestant Saxony in order to practice their faith. His uncle was Count Nikolaus Ludwig von Zinzendorff und Pottendorf, a famous religious and social reformer and bishop of the Moravian Church.

Karl Zinzendorf studied law at the University of Jena from 1757 to 1760. In 1761 he moved to Vienna for purposes of taking up a government position in commerce. In 1764 he converted to the Catholic faith, the state religion of the Austrian Empire, for purposes of pursuing his career there.

== Government career ==
During the years 1764 to 1770 he took a series of government posts in a variety of foreign locations: Switzerland, Italy, Malta, Germany, the Netherlands, France, Spain, Portugal, the British Isles, and Belgium. He spent the years 1770–76 in Vienna, whereupon he took up a new position (1776–81) as governor of Trieste. He was responsible for building the road between Trieste and Vienna (named in his honor by the town Zinzendorf).

== Appalt ==
As privy finance minister (President of the Court Audit Office) to Emperor Joseph II between 1782 and 1792 von Zinzendorf introduced a uniform system of accounting for state revenues, expenditures, and debts of the territories of the Austrian crown, called Appalt.

Austria was more successful than France in meeting regular expenditures and in gaining credit. However, the events of Joseph II's last years also suggest that the government was financially vulnerable to the European wars that ensued after 1792.

== Death ==
Zinzendorf continued to receive various promotions until his retirement in 1809. He died in 1813.

== Legacy ==
Unlike many of the aristocrats which whom he was acquainted, Zinzendorf was not wealthy. According to Link, "it was poverty that prevented him from marrying." In 1769 he joined the Teutonic Order; this involved vows of poverty, chastity, and piety; it "neatly masked the social embarrassment of his situation, provided him with lodgings, and would eventually give him security in his old age" (Link). Zinzendorf did receive a "sizeable" inheritance in 1806, but by then most of his life had passed by.

=== The diaries ===
Zinzendorf is remembered for the massive diary he kept, starting at age eight and continuing to his death. Still unpublished, it covers 76 volumes. The diary is written in French, a language widely used by German aristocrats in Zinzendorf's day. Historical musicology is indebted to the diaries because Zinzendorf was an inveterate theater-goer and records a great deal of information about performances and performers that would otherwise have been lost. The mature operas of Mozart were among the best-known works that Zinzendorf witnessed at their first performances.

== See also ==
- Appalt
- History of accounting
- Tench Coxe
