= Neomercantilism =

Economic policy

Neomercantilism (also spelled neo-mercantilism) is a policy regime that encourages exports, discourages imports, controls capital movement, and centralizes currency decisions in the hands of a central government. The objective of neomercantilist policies is to increase the level of foreign reserves held by the government, allowing more effective monetary policy and fiscal policy.

== Background ==
Neomercantilism is considered the oldest school of thought in international political economy (IPE). It is rooted in mercantilism, a preindustrial doctrine, and gained ground during the Industrial Revolution. It is also considered the IPE counterpart of realism in the sense that both hold that power is central in global relations. This regime is also associated with corporatocracy particularly during the 1970s when both were treated as components of a functional system and policy goals. In the United States, neomercantilism was embraced in the late 20th century amidst the move to buttress American industries from Japanese competition. American thinkers who subscribed to the doctrine, however, include Alexander Hamilton, one of the Founding Fathers of the United States and the first U.S. secretary of the treasury.

== See also ==
- Developmentalism
- Mercantilism
- Mundell–Fleming model
- New classical macroeconomics
- Tariffs in the second Trump administration
- Economic policy of the second Trump administration
