= Indur M. Goklany =

American government official

- Education: Indian Institutes of Technology (B.Tech.); Michigan State University (M.S., Ph.D.)
- Occupations: Science and technology policy analyst
- Employer: United States Department of the Interior
- Notable work: The Improving State of the World
- Website: goklany.org

Indur M. Goklany is a science policy advisor in the United States Department of the Interior. Trained as an electrical engineer, he has often promoted views at odds with the scientific consensus on climate change, asserting that there is a lack of agreement among scientists and arguing that increased atmospheric carbon dioxide has various beneficial effects.

In 2017, the Trump administration promoted him to a position charged with reviewing climate policy.

== Education ==
Goklany has a B. Tech degree in electrical engineering from the Indian Institutes of Technology and M.S. and Ph.D. degrees, also in electrical engineering, from Michigan State University.

== Views on environmental policy ==
In 2017, Goklany was promoted to the position of Assistant Director of Programs, Science and Technology Policy at the Department of the Interior. In that role he was responsible for reviewing climate policies. He has repeatedly inserted climate change denial language into the department's scientific reports, which are used to make decisions on matters like water and mineral rights. The wording includes claims that there is a lack of consensus for global warming among scientists and that increased atmospheric carbon dioxide is beneficial.

He took part in the making of Policy Peril: Why Global Warming Policies are More Dangerous than Global Warming Itself, a film created by the Competitive Enterprise Institute, a right-wing think tank engaged in manufacturing climate change denialism. He has also written papers for the Heartland Institute, who paid him $1,000 a month in 2012 for writing a chapter in their book. At a Heartland-organised conference in 2017, he posited a correlation between rising CO_{2} levels and life expectancy and GDP, saying "we’re actually living in the best of times, and carbon dioxide and fossils fuels are a good part of that."

Goklany has argued that while "hysteria over global warming" is fueled by concerns of increased worldwide hunger and driving species to extinction, the proposed use biofuels and ethanol would only make both issues worse. He has also been critical of the World Wide Fund for Nature and the United Nations Population Fund over their stance on population growth saying, "For many groups like the Worldwide Fund for Nature (WWF), World Population Day, which fell on July 11, is another chance to bemoan 'the relentless growth in human population,' while the United Nations Population Fund says 'stabilizing population would help sustain the planet.' The problem, however, is not population but poverty."

In 2021, Climate Feedback fact-checked an article by Breitbart which repeated inaccurate and misleading claims made by Goklany in a post for the Global Warming Policy Foundation. The reviewers noted that Goklany is "an electrical engineer, not a climate scientist, who hasn’t published any peer-reviewed research in at least the past decade on the topics he wrote about".

== Works ==
Books

- Goklany, Indur M. (2006). The Improving State of the World: Why We're Living Longer, Healthier, More Comfortable Lives on a Cleaner Planet. The Cato Institute. ISBN 978-1-930865-98-3.
- Goklany, Indur M. (November 2002). The Precautionary Principle: A Critical Appraisal of Environmental Risk. The Cato Institute. ISBN 978-1-930865-16-7.
- Goklany, Indur M. (November 26, 1999). Clearing the Air: The Real Story of the War on Air Pollution. The Cato Institute. ISBN 978-1-882577-83-5.

Papers

- Goklany, Indur M. (September 19, 2009). "Climate change is not the biggest global health threat". The Lancet. 374 (9694): 973–974. doi:10.1016/S0140-6736(09)61655-X. PMID 19766873. S2CID 40726069.
- Goklany, Indur M. (July 29, 2009). "Is Climate Change the "Defining Challenge of Our Age"?". Energy & Environment. 20 (3): 279–302. doi:10.1260/095830509788066439. S2CID 11221590.
- Goklany, Indur M. (November 2002). "From precautionary principle to risk–risk analysis". Nature. 20 (1075): 1075. doi:10.1038/nbt1102-1075. PMID 12410243. S2CID 14184396.
- Goklany, Indur M. (October 15, 2015). "Carbon Dioxide: The Good News". The Heartland Institute. Archived from the original on December 16, 2019.
- Goklany, Indur M. (December 1, 2014). "Unhealthy Exaggeration: The WHO Report on Climate Change". The Heartland Institute.
