= The Improving State of the World =

Book by Indur M. Goklany

- Author: Indur M. Goklany
- Publisher: Cato Institute
- Publication date: 2007
- ISBN: 1930865988

The Improving State of the World: Why We're Living Longer, Healthier, More Comfortable Lives On a Cleaner Planet (ISBN 1930865988) is a 2007 book by Indur M. Goklany, published by the Cato Institute. As per the title, it argues that the state of the world and humanity is rapidly improving.

== Contents ==
The book lists many supporting statistics:

- The average person has never been better fed than today. Between 1961 and 2002, the world average daily food supply per person increased by 24% (38% in developing nations). Chronic undernourishment in developing nations declined from 37 to 17 percent of their population between 1969–71 and 2000–02. Greater agricultural productivity and international trade has caused inflation-adjusted prices of food commodities to decline by 75 percent since 1950. Access to safe water and sanitation has increased.
- Before industrialization, at least one out of every five children died before reaching his or her first birthday, equivalent to more than 20%. In 2003 the worldwide rate was 5.7% which is approximately the same as the developed nations had in 1950. The progress is illustrated by that many developing nations, such as India, Peru, and Ghana, in 1998 had a lower infant mortality than the US had in 1913.
- For much of human history, life expectancy used to be between 20 and 30 years. By 1900 it had increased to 31 years. By 2003 it was 66.8 years. Even in Africa, the poorest continent, it has increased to 45.6 years. Not only are people living longer, they are also healthier in old age. During the course of the 20th century, the average onsets of diseases such heart disease (9 years), respiratory disease (11 years), and cancer (8 years), have been delayed.
- Between 1970 and the early 2000s, global illiteracy rates dropped from 36 to 18 percent. Globally, the percentage of relevant population enrolled in tertiary education increased from 6.8 to 25.6 percent between 1965 and 2001.
- Worldwide child labor (age 10–14) has decreased from 24.9 percent in 1960 to 10.5 percent in 2003.
- Total lifetime spent working for the average British worker declined from 50 to 20 percent of the total "disposable life hours" between 1856 and 1981. Due mainly to improved and cheaper lighting, the increase in free time is arguable even greater, since darkness previously greatly restricted available activities, especially for the poor.
- In 1900 no country had universal suffrage and only 12.4 percent of the world's population had even limited suffrage. Today 44.1 percent of the world's population live in nations deemed free by Freedom House and another 18.6 percent in nations deemed partly free.

A common perception is that such progress from economic growth and technology is unsustainable due to worsening environmental problems. The book argues that this is wrong. In the early stages of economic and technological development environmental impact does increase. Improving access to factors such as food, shelter, and electricity is seen as more important than the environment. As development continues and these problems are tackled, the environmental impact becomes a higher priority, and then steps are taken to reduce it. This pattern can be seen for many environmental indicators, such as air quality, availability of safe water, sanitation, and DDT and PCB residues in human tissues, which initially declined with increasing development but have more recently improved.

On the other hand, "The reality ... is that the fight over environmental regulation, at least in the United States, was -- and remains -- a fierce one and that environmental skeptics and businesses have done their best to prevent regulations such as the Clean Air and Clean Water Acts from ever becoming law. It is also the case that without those regulations, the 'cleaner planet' Goklany sees today would not exist.... The point is that far from being the inevitable product of a strong economy, environmental improvement is often the result of political struggles that could very easily have gone the other way." says James Surowiecki in his review of the book.

Goklany in a reply stated "I am no more convinced than he is about the inevitability of progress" and that the book had stated "a democratic society, because it has the political means to do so, will translate its desire for a cleaner environment into laws, either because cleanup is not voluntary or rapid enough, or because of sheer symbolism. The wealthier such a society, the more affordable -- and more demanding -- its laws."

== See also ==
- The Skeptical Environmentalist: Measuring the Real State of the World
- Global Crises, Global Solutions
- Cool It: The Skeptical Environmentalist's Guide to Global Warming
