= Edward Misselden =

Edward Misselden (fl. 1608–1654) was an English merchant, and leading member of the writers in the Mercantilist group of economic thought. He argued that international movements of money and fluctuations in the exchange rate depended upon the international trade flows and not the manipulations of the bankers, which was the popular view at the time. He suggested that trading returns should be established for purposes of statistical analysis, so that the state could regulate trade with a view to obtaining export surpluses.

== Life ==
He was deputy-governor of the Merchant Adventurers' Company at Delft from 1623 until 1633. On his departure from England (October 1623) the East India Company invited him to act as one of their commissioners at Amsterdam to negotiate a private treaty with the Dutch; he had probably been employed by the Merchant Adventurers' Company in 1616 in a similar capacity. His fellow-commissioner was Robert Barlow, East India merchant. The negotiations, however, were fruitless, and the report of the Amboyna massacre made progress difficult.

In low health, Misselden returned to England, and presented to the company an account of the negotiations (3 November 1624). He returned to Delft at the end of November 1624, and during the next four years he was again employed by the East India Company in the Amboyna matter. He was also entrusted with the negotiations on behalf of the Merchant Adventurers' Company for a reduction of the duties on English cloth. Dudley Carleton, the English ambassador at the Hague, believed that he had been bribed by the Dutch, while the States-General, on the other hand, suspected him of compromising their interests by sending secret information to England, and confronted him (October 1628) with some of his letters. Missenden was aggrieved at his treatment, and declined to have anything further to do with the East India Company's affairs. His case was taken up by the privy council, and reparation was made (1628).

Misselden supported William Laud's schemes for bringing the practice of the English congregations abroad into conformity with that of the Church of England. The merchant adventurers at Delft were strongly presbyterian, and John Forbes, their preacher, exercised great influence. Misselden's attempts to impose the Book of Common Prayer were met by plots to eject him from his position, and he and Forbes were bitterly opposed. He was ultimately turned out, and the company chose in his place Samuel Avery, a presbyterian.

Two years later (1635) abortive attempts were made to obtain his election as deputy-governor at Rotterdam, and Charles I addressed a letter to the Merchant Adventurers' Company vainly recommending them to deprive Robert Edwards who was in the post. Behind this lay the fact that Missenden had furnished Philip Burlamachi with large sums for the king's service, and in May 1633, £13,000 remained unpaid.

Misselden was subsequently employed by the Merchant Adventurers' Company on missions. Around 1650 he was in Hamburg, and tried to make himself useful to the Parliamentary regime; but his reputation as a royalist told against him.

== Writings ==
Misselden's economic writings were prompted mainly by the appointment of the standing commission on trade (1622). In his Free Trade, or the Means to make Trade flourish, London, 1622, he discussed the causes of the alleged decay of trade, which he attributed to excessive consumption of foreign commodities, exportation of bullion by the East India Company, and defective searching in the cloth trade. His object appears to have been to disarm the opposition to the regulated companies, especially the Merchant Adventurers', and turn it against the joint-stock associations.

The views he put forth on the East India trade were inconsistent with those he advocated in the following year. Gerard Malynes immediately attacked his pamphlet, opposing the principles of foreign exchange. In reply Misselden published The Circle of Commerce, or the Ballance of Trade, in Defence of Free Trade, opposed to Malynes' " Little Fish and his Great Whale," and poized against them in the Scale, London, 1623. After dealing with Malynes's views, and stating a theory of exchange, he discussed the balance of trade. He defended the exportation of bullion on the ground that by the re-exportation of the commodities the country was thus enabled to purchase, the treasure of the nation was augmented. His theory of the balance of trade is similar to that later developed by Thomas Mun.
