= Mercantilism =

Economic policy emphasizing exports

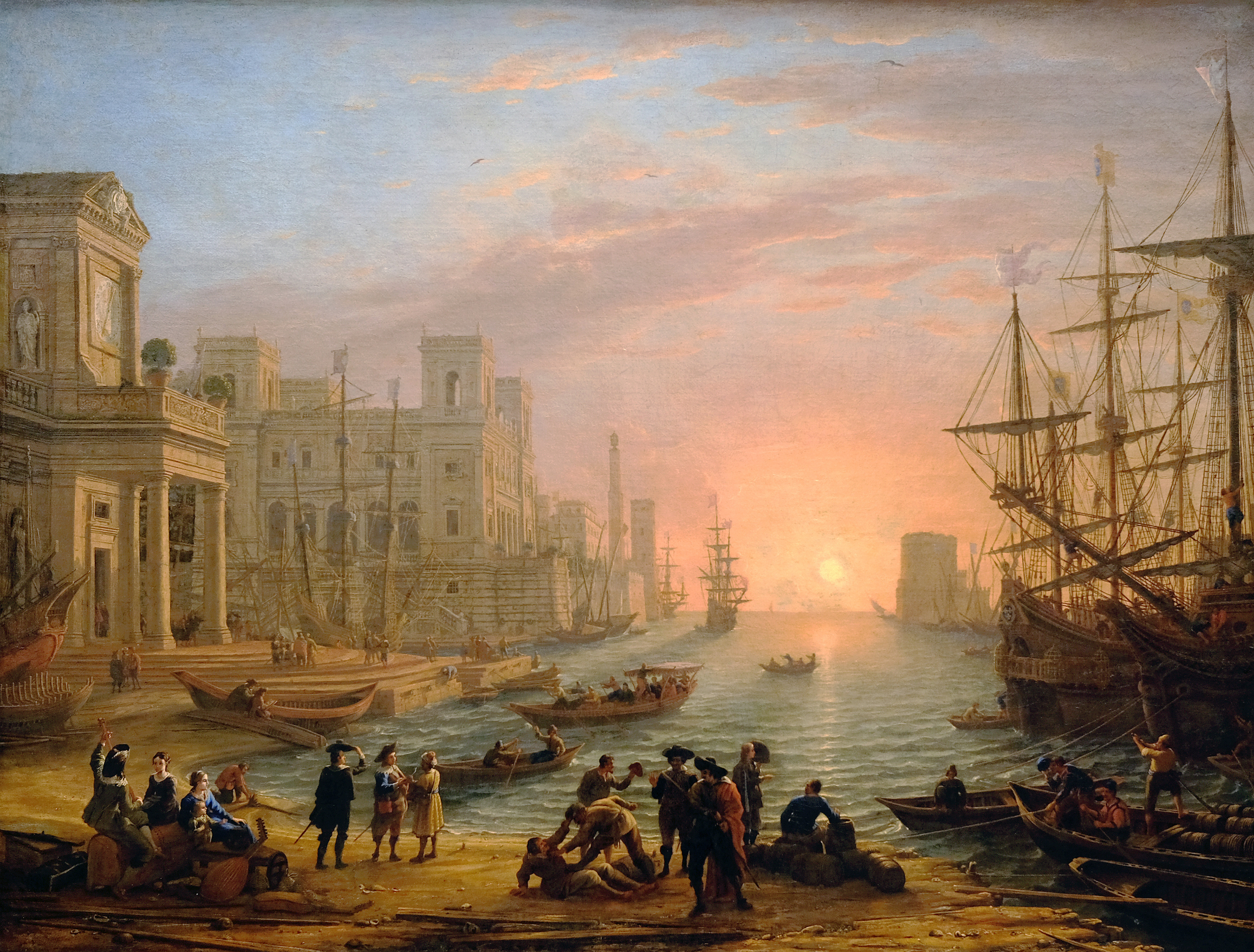
Seaport at sunset, a painting by Claude Lorrain, completed in 1639 at the height of mercantilism

Mercantilism is an economic system and type of nationalist economic policy that is designed to maximize exports and minimize imports of an economy. It seeks to maximize the accumulation of resources within the country and use those resources for one-sided trade. Mercantilist policies have contributed to armed conflict and motivated colonial expansion. Economic intervention – especially in industrializing countries – is seen as modern mercantilism.

Within economic planning, the concept aims to reduce a possible current account deficit or reach a current account surplus, and it includes measures aimed at accumulating monetary reserves by a positive balance of trade, especially of finished goods. Mercantilism promotes government regulation of a nation's economy for the purpose of augmenting and bolstering state power at the expense of rival national powers.

Throughout history, high tariffs, especially on manufactured goods, were almost universally a feature of mercantilist policy. Mercantilism was dominant in modernized parts of Europe and some areas in Africa from the 16th to the 19th centuries, a period of proto-industrialization. International trade treaties and groups have led to the advent of non-tariff barriers to trade which have culminated to produce neomercantilism.

== History ==
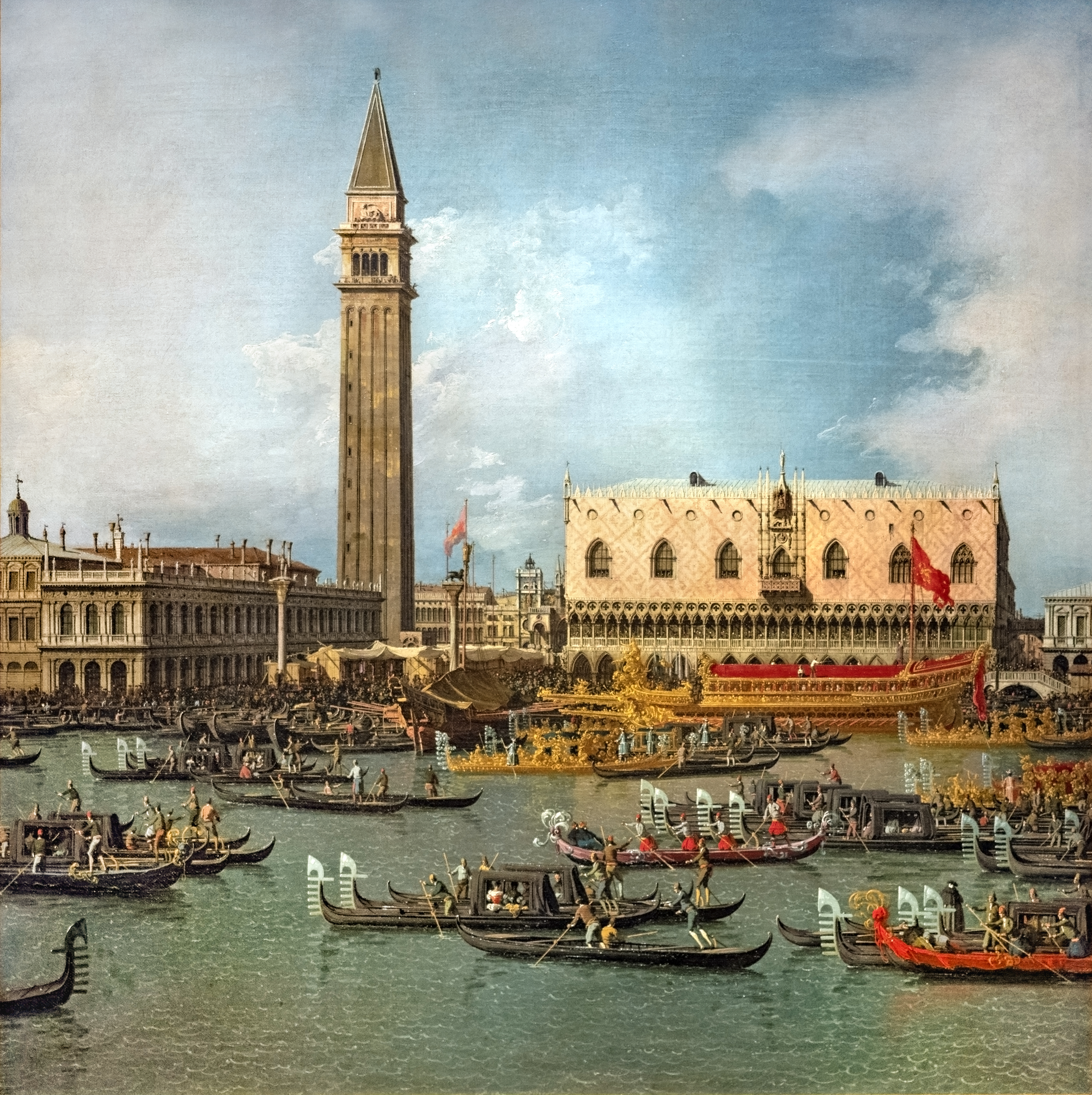
Merchants in Venice

Mercantilism became the dominant school of economic thought in Europe throughout the late Renaissance and the early modern period (from the 15th to the 18th centuries) before advent of Classical liberalism. Evidence of mercantilistic practices appeared in early modern Venice, Genoa, and Pisa regarding control of the Mediterranean trade in bullion. However, the empiricism of the Renaissance, which first began to quantify large-scale trade accurately, marked the beginning of mercantilism as a codified school of economic theories. The Italian economist and mercantilist Antonio Serra is considered to have written one of the first treatises on political economy in his 1613 work, A Short Treatise on the Wealth and Poverty of Nations.

Mercantilism, in its simplest form, is all about bullionism, or the theory that a nation's wealth is measured in terms of how much precious metal, particularly gold and silver, it possesses. Mercantilist authors were concerned with the movement of money, however, more than with the hoarding of it. They felt that money needed to move through the economy to induce trade and economic activity, a concept different from that of simply amassing wealth. This focus on money's role, specifically precious metals, mirrors modern discussions of the money supply and its implications for economic growth, i.e., how money supply expansion can stimulate economic activity. However, with the advent of fiat money (money not backed by a physical commodity) and floating exchange rates, the importance of specie (gold and silver) in economic systems has diminished. Progressively, the focus shifted from the handling of money to the implementation of industrial policies that placed greater economic goals, e.g., stimulating general prosperity and supporting technological and industrial advancement, above the financing of war.

England began the first large-scale and integrative approach to mercantilism during the Elizabethan era (1558–1603). An early statement on national balance of trade appeared in Discourse of the Common Wealth of this Realm of England, 1549: "We must always take heed that we buy no more from strangers than we sell them, for so should we impoverish ourselves and enrich them." The period featured various but often disjointed efforts by the court of Queen Elizabeth I (r. 1558–1603) to develop a naval and merchant fleet capable of challenging the Spanish stranglehold on trade and of expanding the growth of bullion at home. Queen Elizabeth promoted trade and navigation acts in Parliament and issued orders to her navy for the protection and promotion of English shipping. The first Navigation Acts regulating trade were passed by Parliament in 1651 and 1652, during the English Commonwealth.

Authors noted most for establishing the English mercantilist system include Gerard de Malynes (fl. 1585–1641) and Thomas Mun (1571–1641), who first articulated the Elizabethan system (England's Treasure by Foreign Trade or the Balance of Foreign Trade is the Rule of Our Treasure), which Josiah Child (c. 1630/31–1699) then developed further.

Numerous French authors helped cement French policy around statist mercantilism in the 17th century, as King Louis XIV (reigned 1643–1715) followed the guidance of Jean Baptiste Colbert, his Controller-General of Finances from 1665 to 1683 who revised the tariff system and expanded industrial policy. Colbertism was based on the principle that the state should rule in the economic realm as it did in the diplomatic, and that the interests of the state as identified by the king were superior to those of merchants and of everyone else. Mercantilist economic policies aimed to build up the state, especially in an age of incessant warfare, and theorists charged the state with looking for ways to strengthen the economy and to weaken foreign adversaries.

In Europe, academic belief in mercantilism began to fade in the late 18th century after the East India Company annexed Mughal Bengal, a major trading nation, and the establishment of British India through the activities of the East India Company, in light of the arguments of Adam Smith (1723–1790) and of the classical economists. French economic policy liberalized greatly under Napoleon (in power from 1799 to 1814/1815). The British Parliament's repeal of the Corn Laws under Robert Peel in 1846 symbolized the emergence of free trade as an alternative system.

== Theory ==
Most of the European economists who wrote between 1500 and 1750 are today generally described as mercantilists; this term was initially used solely by critics, such as Mirabeau and Smith, but historians proved quick to adopt it. Originally the standard English term was "mercantile system". The word "mercantilism" came into English from German in the early-19th century.

The bulk of what is commonly called "mercantilist literature" appeared in the 1620s in Great Britain. Smith saw the English merchant Thomas Mun (1571–1641) as a major creator of the mercantile system, especially in his posthumously published Treasure by Foreign Trade (1664), which Smith considered the archetype or manifesto of the movement. Perhaps the last major mercantilist work was James Steuart's Principles of Political Economy, published in 1767.

Mercantilist literature also extended beyond England. Italy and France produced noted writers of mercantilist themes, including Italy's Giovanni Botero (1544–1617) and Antonio Serra (fl. 16th–17th centuries) and, in France, Jean Bodin and Jean-Baptiste Colbert. Themes also existed in writers from the German historical school from List, as well as followers of the American and British systems of free-trade, thus stretching the system into the 19th century. However, many British writers, including Mun and Edward Misselden, were merchants, while many of the writers from other countries were public officials. Beyond mercantilism as a way of understanding the wealth and power of nations, Mun and Misselden are noted for their viewpoints on a wide range of economic matters.

The Austrian lawyer and scholar Philipp Wilhelm von Hornick, one of the pioneers of cameralism, detailed a nine-point program of what he deemed effective national economy in his Austria Over All, If She Only Will of 1684, which comprehensively sums up the tenets of mercantilism:

- That every little bit of a country's soil be utilized for agriculture, mining or manufacturing.
- That all raw materials found in a country be used in domestic manufacture, since finished goods have a higher value than raw materials.
- That a large, working population be encouraged.
- That all exports of gold and silver be prohibited and all domestic money be kept in circulation.
- That all imports of foreign goods be discouraged as much as possible.
- That where certain imports are indispensable they be obtained at first hand, in exchange for other domestic goods instead of gold and silver.
- That as much as possible, imports be confined to raw materials that can be finished [in the home country].
- That opportunities be constantly sought for selling a country's surplus manufactures to foreigners, so far as necessary, for gold and silver.
- That no importation be allowed if such goods are sufficiently and suitably supplied at home.

Other than Von Hornick, there were no mercantilist writers presenting an overarching scheme for the ideal economy, as Adam Smith would later do for classical economics. Rather, each mercantilist writer tended to focus on a single area of the economy. Only later did non-mercantilist scholars integrate these "diverse" ideas into what they called mercantilism. Some scholars thus reject the idea of mercantilism completely, arguing that it gives "a false unity to disparate events". Smith saw the mercantile system as an enormous conspiracy by manufacturers and merchants against consumers, a view that has led some authors, especially Robert E. Ekelund and Robert D. Tollison, to call mercantilism "a rent-seeking society". To a certain extent, mercantilist doctrine itself made a general theory of economics impossible. Mercantilists viewed the economic system as a zero-sum game, in which any gain by one party required a loss by another. Thus, any system of policies that benefited one group would by definition harm the other, and there was no possibility of economics being used to maximize the commonwealth, or common good. Mercantilists' writings were also generally created to rationalize particular practices rather than as investigations into the best policies.

Mercantilist domestic policy was more fragmented than its trade policy. While Adam Smith portrayed mercantilism as supportive of strict controls over the economy, many mercantilists disagreed. The early modern era was one of letters patent and government-imposed monopolies; some mercantilists supported these, but others acknowledged the corruption and inefficiency of such systems. Many mercantilists also realized that the inevitable results of quotas and price ceilings were black markets. One notion that mercantilists widely agreed upon was the need for economic oppression of the working population; laborers and farmers were to live at the "margins of subsistence". The goal was to maximize production, with no concern for consumption. Extra money, free time, and education for the lower classes were seen to inevitably lead to vice and laziness, and would result in harm to the economy.

The mercantilists saw a large population as a form of wealth that made possible the development of bigger markets and armies. Opposite to mercantilism was the doctrine of physiocracy, which predicted that mankind would outgrow its resources. The idea of mercantilism was to protect the markets as well as maintain agriculture and those who were dependent upon it.

== Policies ==
Mercantilist ideas were the dominant economic ideology of all of Europe in the early modern period, and most states embraced it to a certain degree. Mercantilism was centred on England and France, and it was in these states that mercantilist policies were most often enacted. The United States, a former British colony, has also employed mercantilist policies at times in its economic history.

The policies have included:

- High tariffs, especially on manufactured goods.
- Forbidding colonies to trade with other nations.
- Monopolizing markets with staple ports.
- Banning the export of gold and silver, even for payments.
- Forbidding trade to be carried in foreign ships, as per, for example, the Navigation Acts.
- Subsidies on exports.
- Promoting manufacturing and industry through research or direct subsidies.
- Limiting wages.
- Maximizing the use of domestic resources.
- Restricting domestic consumption through non-tariff barriers to trade.

=== France ===
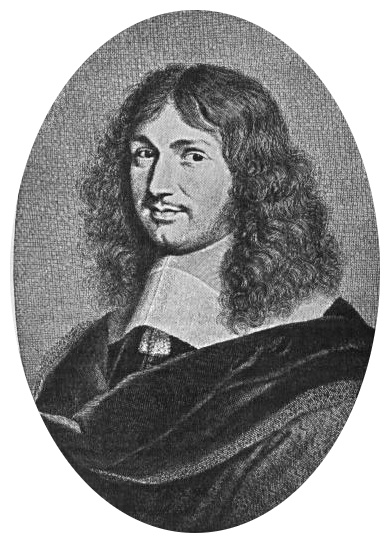
French finance minister and mercantilist Jean-Baptiste Colbert served for over 20 years.

Mercantilism arose in France in the early 16th century soon after the monarchy had become the dominant force in French politics. In 1539, an important decree banned the import of woolen goods from Spain and some parts of Flanders. The next year, a number of restrictions were imposed on the export of bullion.

Over the rest of the 16th century, further protectionist measures were introduced. The height of French mercantilism is closely associated with Jean-Baptiste Colbert, finance minister for 22 years in the 17th century, to the extent that French mercantilism is sometimes called Colbertism. Under Colbert, the French government became deeply involved in the economy in order to increase exports. Protectionist policies were enacted that limited imports and favored exports. Industries were organized into guilds and monopolies, and production was regulated by the state through a series of more than one thousand directives outlining how different products should be produced.

To encourage industry, foreign artisans and craftsmen were imported. Colbert also worked to decrease internal barriers to trade, reducing internal tariffs and building an extensive network of roads and canals. Colbert's policies were quite successful, and France's industrial output and the economy grew considerably during this period, as France became the dominant European power. He was less successful in turning France into a major trading power, and Britain and the Dutch Republic remained supreme in this field.

=== New France ===
France imposed its mercantilist philosophy on its colonies in North America, especially New France. It sought to derive the maximum material benefit from the colony, for the homeland, with a minimum of colonial investment in the colony itself. The ideology was embodied in New France through the establishment under Royal Charter of a number of corporate trading monopolies including La Compagnie des Marchands, which operated from 1613 to 1621, and the Compagnie de Montmorency, from that date until 1627. It was in turn replaced by La Compagnie des Cent-Associés, created in 1627 by King Louis XIII, and the Communauté des habitants in 1643. These were the first corporations to operate in what is now Canada.

=== United Kingdom ===
In England, mercantilism reached its peak during the Long Parliament government (1640–60). Mercantilist policies were also embraced throughout much of the Tudor and Stuart periods, with Robert Walpole being another major proponent. In Britain, government control over the domestic economy was far less extensive than on the Continent, limited by common law and the steadily increasing power of Parliament. Government-controlled monopolies were common, especially before the English Civil War, but were often controversial.

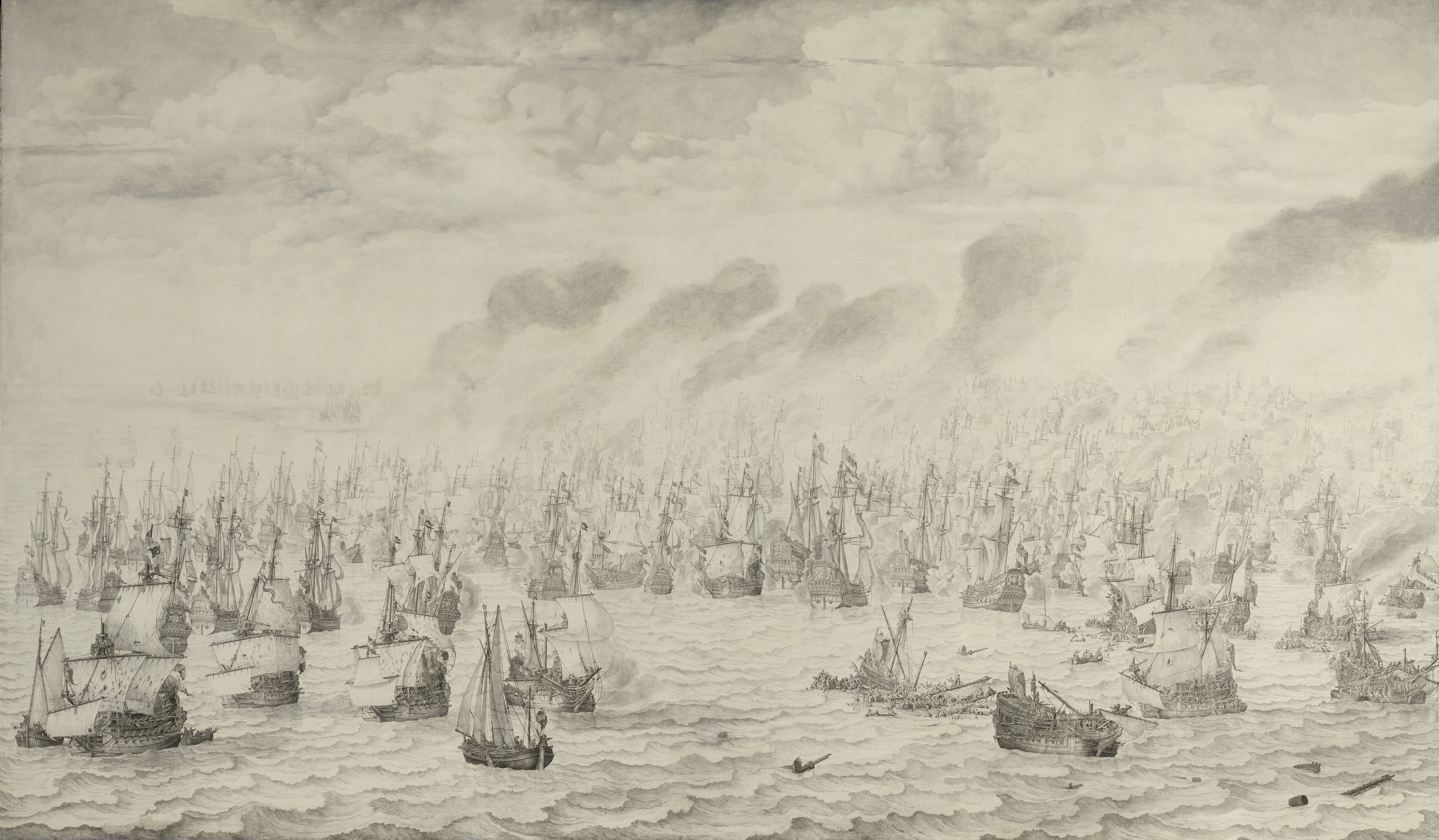
The Anglo-Dutch Wars were fought between the English and the Dutch for control over the seas and trade routes.

With respect to its colonies, British mercantilism meant that the government and the merchants became partners with the goal of increasing political power and private wealth, to the exclusion of other European powers. The government protected its merchants—and kept foreign ones out—through trade barriers, regulations, and subsidies to domestic industries in order to maximize exports from and minimize imports to the realm. The government had to fight smuggling, which became a favourite American technique in the 18th century to circumvent the restrictions on trading with the French, Spanish, or Dutch. The goal of mercantilism was to run trade surpluses to benefit the government. The government took its share through duties and taxes, with the remainder going to merchants in Britain. The government spent much of its revenue on the Royal Navy, which both protected the colonies of Britain but was vital in capturing the colonies of other European powers.

British mercantilist writers were themselves divided on whether domestic controls were necessary. British mercantilism thus mainly took the form of efforts to control trade. A wide array of regulations were put in place to encourage exports and discourage imports. Tariffs were placed on imports and bounties given for exports, and the export of some raw materials was banned completely. The Navigation Acts removed foreign merchants from being involved England's domestic trade. British policies in their American colonies led to friction with the inhabitants of the Thirteen Colonies, and mercantilist policies (such as forbidding trade with other European powers and enforcing bans on smuggling) were a major irritant leading to the American Revolution.

Mercantilism taught that trade was a zero-sum game, with one country's gain equivalent to a loss sustained by the trading partner. Some have argued that mercantilist policies had a positive impact on Britain, helping to transform the nation into the world's dominant trading power and a global hegemon. One domestic policy that had a lasting impact was the conversion of "wastelands" to agricultural use. Mercantilists believed that to maximize a nation's power, all land and resources had to be used to their highest and best use, and this era thus saw projects like the draining of The Fens.

=== United States ===
The American School of economics dominated United States national policies from the time of the American Civil War until the mid-20th century. It is closely related to mercantilism, and it can be seen as contrary to classical economics. It consisted of these three core policies:

1. Protecting industry through selective high tariffs (especially 1861–1932) and through subsidies (especially 1932–1970).
2. Government investments in infrastructure creating targeted internal improvements (especially in transportation).
3. A national bank with policies that promote the growth of productive enterprises rather than speculation.

=== Other countries ===
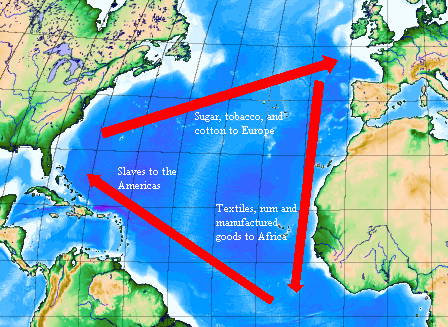
Mercantilism helped create trade patterns such as the triangular trade in the North Atlantic, in which raw materials were imported to the mother country and then processed and redistributed to other colonies.

The other nations of Europe also embraced mercantilism to varying degrees. The Netherlands, which had become the financial centre of Europe by being its most efficient trader, had little interest in seeing trade restricted and adopted few mercantilist policies. Mercantilism became prominent in Central Europe and Scandinavia after the Thirty Years' War (1618–48), with Christina of Sweden, Jacob Kettler of Courland, and Christian IV of Denmark being notable proponents.

The Habsburg Holy Roman Emperors had long been interested in mercantilist policies, but the vast and decentralized nature of their empire made implementing such notions difficult. Some constituent states of the empire did embrace mercantilism, most notably Prussia, which under Frederick the Great had perhaps the most rigidly controlled economy in Europe.

Spain benefited from mercantilism early on as it brought a large amount of precious metals such as gold and silver into their treasury by way of the new world. In the long run, Spain's economy collapsed as it was unable to adjust to the inflation that came with the large influx of bullion. Heavy intervention from the crown put crippling laws for the protection of Spanish goods and services. Mercantilist protectionist policy in Spain caused the long-run failure of the Castilian textile industry as the efficiency severely dropped off with each passing year due to the production being held at a specific level. Spain's heavily protected industries led to famines as much of its agricultural land was required to be used for sheep instead of grain. Much of their grain was imported from the Baltic region of Europe which caused a shortage of food in the inner regions of Spain. Spain limiting the trade of their colonies is one of the causes that led to the separation of the Dutch from the Spanish Empire. The culmination of all of these policies led to Spain defaulting in 1557, 1575, and 1596.

During the economic collapse of the 17th century, Spain had little coherent economic policy, but French mercantilist policies were imported by Philip V with some success. Ottoman Grand Vizier Kemankeş Kara Mustafa Pasha also followed some mercantilist financial policies during the reign of Ibrahim I. According to the historian Alex M. Feldman, Russia under Peter I (Peter the Great) pursued mercantilism based on similarities with concurrent Spanish mercantilism and older models of political economy derived from the Byzantine economy.

== Wars and imperialism ==
Mercantilism was the economic version of warfare backed up by the state apparatus, and was well suited to an era of military warfare. If authorities viewed the level of world trade as fixed, it followed that the only way to increase a polity's trade was to take it from another. A number of wars, most notably the four Anglo-Dutch Wars (from 1652 to 1784) and the Franco-Dutch Wars (as from 1672 to 1678), can be linked directly to mercantilist theories. Most wars had other causes but they reinforced mercantilism by clearly defining the enemy, and justified damage to the enemy's economy.

Mercantilism fueled the imperialism of this era, as many nations expended significant effort to conquer new colonies that would be sources of gold (as in Mexico) or sugar (as in the West Indies), as well as becoming exclusive markets. European power spread around the globe, often under the aegis of companies with government-guaranteed monopolies in certain defined geographical regions, such as the Dutch East India Company or the Hudson's Bay Company (operating in present-day Canada).

With the establishment of overseas colonies by European powers, especially from the 17th century, mercantile theory gained a new and wider significance, in which its aim and ideal became both national and imperialistic.

The connection between Marxist theory and mercantilism has been explored by Marxist economist and sociologist Giovanni Arrighi, who analyzed mercantilism as having three components: "settler colonialism, capitalist slavery, and economic nationalism", and further noted that slavery was "partly a condition and partly a result of the success of settler colonialism".

In the French economy, the triangular trade method was integral in the continuation of mercantilism throughout the 17th and 18th centuries. In order to maximize exports and minimize imports, France worked on a strict Atlantic route: France, to Africa, to the Americas and then back to France. By bringing African slaves to labor in the New World, their labor value increased, and France capitalized upon the market resources produced by slave labor.

Mercantilism as a weapon has continued to be used by countries through the 21st century by way of modern tariffs, as it puts smaller economies in a position where they may need to conform to the larger economies' goals or risk economic ruin due to an imbalance in trade. Trade wars are often dependent on such tariffs and restrictions hurting an opposing economy.

== Origins ==
The term "mercantile system" was used by its foremost critic, Adam Smith, but Mirabeau (1715–1789) had used "mercantilism" earlier. Mercantilism functioned as the economic counterpart of the older version of political power: divine right of kings and absolute monarchy.

Scholars debate why mercantilism dominated economic ideology for 250 years. One group, represented by Jacob Viner, sees mercantilism as simply a straightforward, common-sense system whose logical fallacies remained opaque to people at the time. This, he argues, was because people lacked the necessary analytical tools.

The second school, supported by scholars such as Robert B. Ekelund, portrays mercantilism not as a mistake, but rather as the best possible system for those who developed it. This school argues that rent-seeking merchants and governments developed and enforced mercantilist policies. Merchants benefited greatly from the enforced monopolies, bans on foreign competition, and poverty of the workers. Governments benefited from the high tariffs and payments from the merchants. Whereas later economic ideas were often developed by academics and philosophers, almost all mercantilist writers were merchants or government officials.

Monetarism offers a third explanation for mercantilism. European trade exported bullion to pay for goods from Asia, thus reducing the money supply and putting downward pressure on prices and economic activity. The evidence for this hypothesis is the lack of inflation in the British economy until the Revolutionary and Napoleonic Wars, when paper money came into vogue.

A fourth explanation lies in the increasing professionalisation and technification of the wars of the era, which turned the maintenance of adequate reserve funds (in the prospect of war) into a more and more expensive and eventually competitive business.

Mercantilism developed at a time of transition for the European economy. Isolated feudal estates were being replaced by centralized nation-states as the focus of power. Technological changes in shipping and the growth of urban centers led to a rapid increase in international trade. Mercantilism focused on how this trade could best aid the states. Another important change was the introduction of double-entry bookkeeping and modern accounting. This accounting made extremely clear the inflow and outflow of trade, contributing to the close scrutiny given to the balance of trade. New markets and new mines propelled foreign trade to previously inconceivable volumes, resulting in "the great upward movement in prices" and an increase in "the volume of merchant activity itself".

Before mercantilism, the most important work in economics in Europe was that of the medieval scholastic theorists. The goal of these thinkers was to find an economic system compatible with Christian doctrines of piety and justice. They focused mainly on microeconomics and on local exchanges between individuals. Mercantilism was closely aligned with the other theories and ideas that began to replace the medieval worldview. This period saw the adoption of Machiavellian realpolitik and the primacy of the raison d'état in international relations. The mercantilist idea of all trade as a zero-sum game, in which each side was trying to best the other in a ruthless competition, was integral to the works of Thomas Hobbes. This dark view of human nature also fit well with the Puritan view of the world, and some of the most stridently mercantilist legislation, such as the Navigation Ordinance of 1651, was enacted by the government of Oliver Cromwell.

Jean-Baptiste Colbert's work in 17th-century France came to exemplify classical mercantilism. In the English-speaking world, its ideas were criticized by Adam Smith with the publication of The Wealth of Nations in 1776 and later by David Ricardo with his explanation of comparative advantage. Mercantilism was rejected by Britain and France by the mid-19th century. The British Empire embraced free trade and used its power as the financial center of the world to promote the same. The Guyanese historian Walter Rodney describes mercantilism as the period of the worldwide development of European commerce which began in the 15th century with the voyages of Portuguese and Spanish explorers to Africa, Asia, and the New World.

== Decline ==
Adam Smith, David Hume, Edward Gibbon, Voltaire and Jean-Jacques Rousseau were the founding fathers of anti-mercantilist thought. A number of scholars found important flaws in mercantilism long before Smith developed an ideology that could fully replace it. Critics such as Hume, Dudley North and John Locke undermined much of mercantilism and it steadily lost favor during the 18th century.

In 1690, Locke argued that prices vary in proportion to the quantity of money. Locke's Second Treatise also points towards the heart of the anti-mercantilist critique: that the wealth of the world is not fixed, but is created by human labor (represented embryonically by Locke's labor theory of value). Mercantilists failed to understand the notions of absolute advantage and comparative advantage (this idea was only fully fleshed out in 1817 by David Ricardo) and the benefits of trade. (Note: For instance, imagine that Portugal was a more efficient producer of wine than England, yet in England, cloth could be produced more efficiently than it could in Portugal. Thus if Portugal specialized in wine and England in cloth, both states would end up better off if they traded. This is an example of the reciprocal benefits of trade (whether due to comparative or absolute advantage). In modern economic theory, trade is not a zero-sum game of cutthroat competition because both sides can benefit from it.)

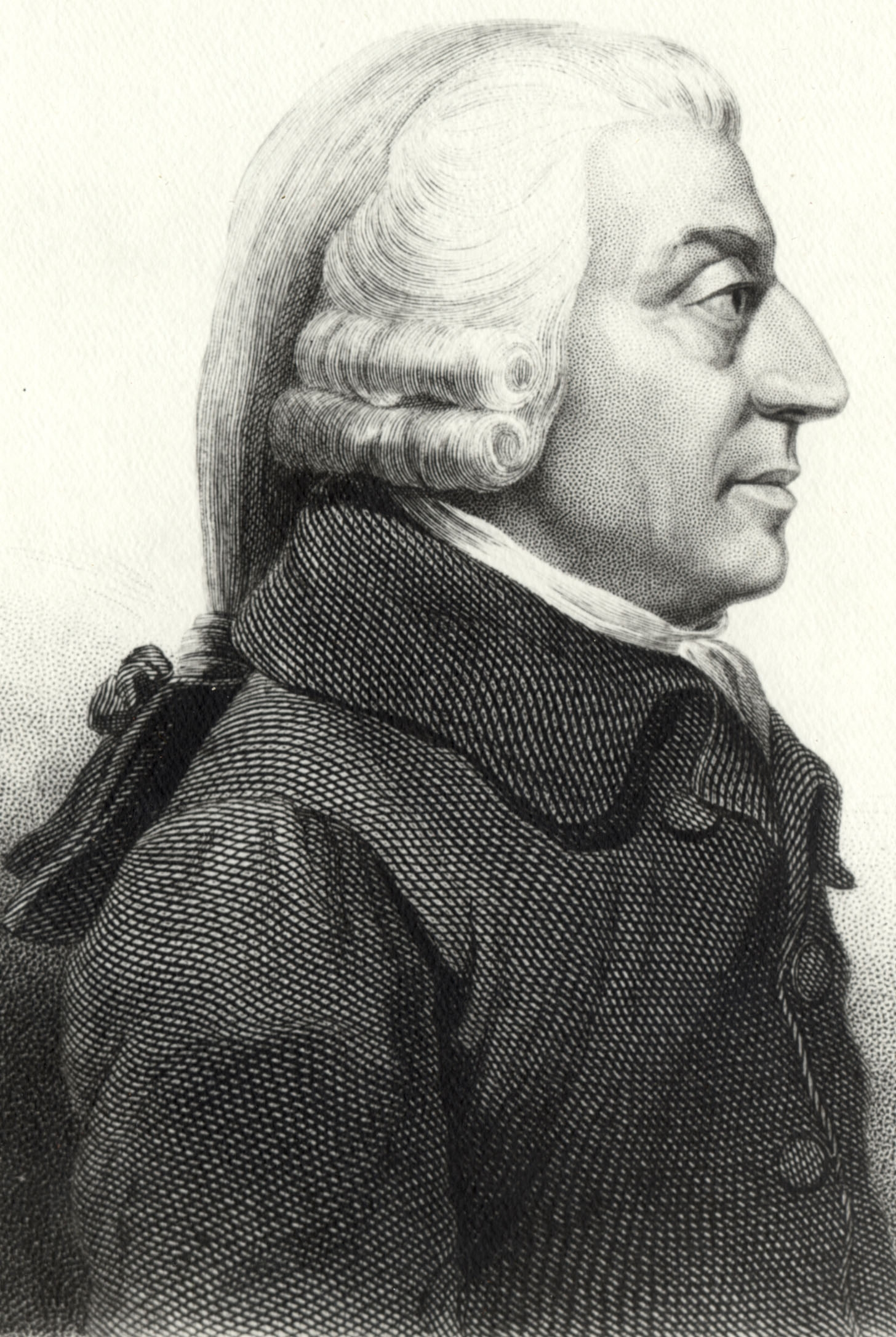
Much of Adam Smith's The Wealth of Nations is a critque of mercantilism.

Hume famously noted the impossibility of the mercantilists' goal of a constant positive balance of trade. As bullion flowed into one country, the supply would increase, and the value of bullion in that state would steadily decline relative to other goods. Conversely, in the state exporting bullion, its value would slowly rise. Eventually, it would no longer be cost-effective to export goods from the high-price country to the low-price country, and the balance of trade would reverse. Mercantilists fundamentally misunderstood this, long arguing that an increase in the money supply simply meant that everyone gets richer.

The importance placed on bullion was also a central target, even if many mercantilists had themselves begun to de-emphasize the importance of gold and silver. Adam Smith noted that at the core of the mercantile system was the "popular folly of confusing wealth with money", that bullion was just the same as any other commodity, and that there was no reason to give it special treatment. More recently, scholars have discounted the accuracy of this critique. They believe Mun and Misselden were not making this mistake in the 1620s, and point to their followers Josiah Child and Charles Davenant, who in 1699 wrote, "Gold and Silver are indeed the Measures of Trade, but that the Spring and Original of it, in all nations is the Natural or Artificial Product of the Country; that is to say, what this Land or what this Labour and Industry Produces." The critique that mercantilism was a form of rent seeking has also seen criticism, as scholars such as Jacob Viner in the 1930s pointed out that merchant mercantilists such as Mun understood that they would not gain by higher prices for English wares abroad.

The first school to completely reject mercantilism was the physiocrats, who developed their theories in France. Their theories also had several important problems, and the replacement of mercantilism did not come until Adam Smith published The Wealth of Nations in 1776. This book outlines the basics of what is today known as classical economics. Smith spent a considerable portion of the book rebutting the arguments of the mercantilists, though often these are simplified or exaggerated versions of mercantilist thought.

Scholars are also divided over the cause of mercantilism's end. Those who believe the theory was simply an error hold that its replacement was inevitable as soon as Smith's more accurate ideas were unveiled. Those who feel that mercantilism amounted to rent-seeking hold that it ended only when major power shifts occurred. In Britain, mercantilism faded as the Parliament gained the monarch's power to grant monopolies. While the wealthy capitalists who controlled the House of Commons benefited from these monopolies, Parliament found it difficult to implement them because of the high cost of group decision making.

Mercantilist regulations were steadily removed over the course of the 18th century in Britain, and during the 19th century, the British government fully embraced free trade and Smith's laissez-faire economics. On the continent, the process was somewhat different. In France, economic control remained in the hands of the royal family, and mercantilism continued until the French Revolution. In Germany, mercantilism remained an important ideology in the 19th and early 20th centuries, when the historical school of economics was paramount.

== Legacy ==
Adam Smith criticized the mercantile doctrine that prioritized production in the economy; he maintained that consumption was of prime significance. Additionally, the mercantile system was well-liked by the traders as it involved what is now referred to as rent seeking.

In specific instances, protectionist mercantilist policies also had an important and positive impact on the state that enacted them. Adam Smith, for instance, praised England's Navigation Acts of 1660 to 1760, as they greatly fostered the expansion of the British merchant fleet and played a central role in turning Britain into the world's naval and economic superpower from the 18th century onward. Some economists thus feel that protecting infant industries, while causing short-term harm, can be beneficial to a specific economy in the long term.

In the 20th century, John Maynard Keynes affirmed that motivating the production process was as significant as encouraging consumption, which benefited the new mercantilism. Keynes also affirmed that in the post-classical period the primary focus on gold- and silver-supplies (bullion) was rational. During the era before paper money, an increase in gold and silver was one of the ways of mercantilism increasing an economy's reserve or the supply of money. Keynes reiterated that the doctrines advocated by mercantilism aided the improvement of both the domestic and foreign outlay – domestic because the policies lowered the domestic rate of interest, and investment by foreigners by tending to create a favorable balance of trade. Keynes and other economists of the 20th century also realized that the balance of payments is an important concern. Keynes also supported government intervention in the economy as necessary, as did mercantilism.

As of 2010, the word "mercantilism" remained a pejorative term, often used to attack various forms of protectionism.

Paul Samuelson, writing within a Keynesian framework, wrote of mercantilism: "With employment less than full and Net National Product suboptimal, all the debunked mercantilist arguments turn out to be valid."

Murray Rothbard, representing the Austrian School of economics, describes it this way:

Mercantilism, which reached its height in the Europe of the seventeenth and eighteenth centuries, was a system of statism which employed economic fallacy to build up a structure of imperial state power, as well as special subsidy and monopolistic privilege to individuals or groups favored by the state. Thus, mercantilism held exports should be encouraged by the government and imports discouraged.

Rothbard viewed mercantilism not as a coherent economic theory but rather as a series of post-hoc rationalizations for various economic policies by interested parties.

=== Neo-mercantilism ===
Some systems that copy several mercantilist policies, such as Japan's economic system, are sometimes called neo-mercantilist. Newsweek business columnist Robert J. Samuelson in 2007 wrote that China was pursuing an essentially neo-mercantilist trade-policy that threatened to undermine the post–World War II international economic structure.

==== Second presidency of Donald Trump ====
After the re-election of Donald Trump as president of the United States in 2024, Serbian-American economist Branko Milanović described Trump's policies of implementing tariffs on imports, trade blocs, and other barriers against China as "neo-mercantilism", stating that it "marks a symbolic end to global neoliberalism".

Michael Strain of the conservative think-tank the American Enterprise Institute also described Trump's policy as a return to mercantilism: "We are seeing a combination of true-believing mercantilism, shocking ignorance about how the global economy works, and shocking incompetence in the planning and execution of economic policy."

== See also ==
- Appalt
- Autarky
- British Empire
- Eden Agreement
- Money-free market
- Neorealism (international relations)
- Crony capitalism
- Royal manufactories in France
