= Gerard de Malynes =

English merchant

Gerard de Malynes (fl. 1585–1627) was an independent merchant in foreign trade, an English commissioner in the Spanish Netherlands, a government advisor on trade matters, assay master of the mint, and commissioner of mint affairs. His dates of birth and death are unknown.

== Life ==
Malynes stated that his ancestors were from Lancashire. His father, a mint-master, may have emigrated about 1552 to Antwerp, where Gerard was born, and returned to England at the time of the restoration of the currency (1561), when Elizabeth obtained the assistance of skilled workmen from Flanders. Malynes showed how an outflow of precious metals could lead to a fall in prices for goods at home and a rise in prices abroad. This was an important clarification of the economic thought of the time. He suggested that higher import tariffs should be levied and exports of bullion prohibited, because he believed that a country's growth was related to the accumulation of precious metals.

Malynes was appointed (about 1586) one of the commissioners of trade in the Low Countries. He was in England in 1587, when he purchased from Sir Francis Drake some of the pearls which Drake brought from Cartagena. He was frequently consulted on mercantile affairs by the privy council. In 1600 he was appointed one of the commissioners for establishing the true par of exchange, and he gave evidence before the committee of the House of Commons on the Merchants' Assurance Bill (November and December 1601). While the Act for the True Making of Woollen Cloth (4 Jac. I, c. 2) was passing through parliament he prepared for the privy council a report showing the weight, length, and breadth of all kinds of cloth.

During the reign of James I, Malynes took part in schemes for developing natural resources. Among them was an attempt to work lead mines in Yorkshire and silver mines in County Durham in 1606, when at his own charge he brought workmen from Germany. He was joined by Lord Eure and some London merchants, but the undertaking failed. Monetary questions were his major concern, and he was an assay master of the mint.

In 1609 Malynes was a commissioner on mint affairs, along with Thomas Knyvet, 1st Baron Knyvet, Sir Richard Martin, John Williams the king's goldsmith, and others. Shortly afterwards he engaged in a scheme for supplying a deficiency in the currency, of coins of small value, by the issue of farthing tokens. Private traders had for some years infringed the royal prerogative by striking farthing tokens in lead. A proposal which seems to have been inspired by Malynes, was put forth in 1612 to remedy this. The scheme was adopted, and John Harington, 2nd Baron Harington of Exton obtained the patent for supplying the new coins (10 April 1613), which he assigned to Malynes and William Cockayne, in accordance with an agreement previously made with the former. On the withdrawal of Cockayne, who did not like the terms of the original grant, Malynes was joined by John Couchman. But from the first the contractors were unfortunate. The Duke of Lennox tried to obtain the patent from Lord Harington by offering better terms than Malynes. The new farthings, which were called "Haringtons", were unpopular. They were refused in Staffordshire, Derbyshire, Flint, and Denbigh; and even in counties where they were accepted the demand for them was low, and in six months the issue was less than £600. The death of Lord Harington in 1614 gave rise to new difficulties, the patent was infringed, and private traders continued to issue illegal coins.

Malynes, in a petition which he addressed to the king from the Fleet Prison (16 February 1619) complained that he had been ruined by his employers, who insisted on paying him in his own farthings. But he appears to have surmounted these difficulties. In 1622 he gave evidence on the state of the coinage before the standing commission on trade. Malynes was impressed with the effects of usurers on the poorer classes. He proposed the adoption of a system of pawnbroking and a mount of piety, under government control. In this way he hoped to enable poor people to obtain loans at a moderate rate of interest.

In 1622 Malynes and fellow merchant Edward Misselden began a famous dispute on free trade. Malynes opposed free trade.

Malynes addressed a petition to the House of Commons of 1641.

== Books ==
- A Treatise of the Canker of Englands Common Wealth (1601)
- St George for England, allegorically described (1601)
- England's View in the Unmasking of two Paradoxes (1603)
- The Maintenance of Free Trade, According to the Three Essentiall Parts of Traffique; Namely Commodities, Moneys and Exchange of Moneys, by Bills of Exchanges for other Countries. Or answer to a Treatise of Free Trade, or the meanes to make Trade floushish, lately Published. (1622).
- Consuetudo, vel, Lex Mercatoria: or, The Law Merchant: Divided into three parts, according to the Essential Parts of Traffick Necessary for All Statesmen, Judges, Magistrates, Temporal and Civil Lawyers, Mint-Men, Merchants, Mariners and Others Negotiating in all Places of the World. (1622)
- The Center of the Circle of Commerce (1623)

== Economic theory ==
He was a supporter of ideas similar to mercantilism. He claimed that the scarcity of the currency was due to the speculation of the money changers. Such speculation would make the England's currency devaluate and for that reason the English goods were sold cheap abroad and the foreign goods sold expensively in national soil; for this the balance of trade would be in deficit.

== Notes ==
Attribution

This article incorporates text from a publication now in the public domain: Hewins, William Albert Samuel (1893). "Malynes, Gerard". In Lee, Sidney (ed.). Dictionary of National Biography. Vol. 36. London: Smith, Elder & Co.
