= Fossil Future =

2022 book by Alex Epstein

Fossil Future: Why Global Human Flourishing Requires More Oil, Coal, and Natural Gas—Not Less
- Author: Alex Epstein
- Language: English
- Subject: Fossil fuels
- Publisher: Portfolio Hardcover
- Publication date: May 24, 2022
- Publication place: United States
- Media type: Print
- Pages: 480 pages
- ISBN: 9780593420416

Fossil Future: Why Global Human Flourishing Requires More Oil, Coal, and Natural Gas–Not Less is a 2022 book by Alex Epstein that argues in support of fossil fuels. The book also criticizes experts, who Epstein says have often been wrong in their predictions about climate change.

In the book's pre-amble, Alex speaks directly to the reader stating this book is designed to be a more current, more comprehensive, far clearer and future orientated book covering the same topics (and more) as his 2014 book The Moral Case for Fossil Fuels.

== Reception ==
The book received mixed and contradictory reviews.

Foreign Policy called the book a sequel to the "flawed" arguments of Epstein's first book, The Moral Case for Fossil Fuels. Slate also criticized the book stating, "This New Style of Climate Denial Will Make You Wish the Bad Old Days Were Back." The New Republic said of the book that, "We may all start hearing about [Alex Epstein] more often because the time is ripe for his particular brand of fossil fuel boosterism to become the GOP's mainstream climate talking point." Vox stated that the book, and Epstein more generally, offers a form of "complacent optimism."

Economist Tyler Cowen, writing in his blog Marginal Revolution offered a mix of praise and criticism, stating that "Why could he not have had the subtitle: “Why Global Human Flourishing Requires More Oil, Coal, and Natural Gas for a while, and Then Less”? Then I would be happier. In economic language, you could say he is not considering enough of the margins." Climate contrarian Roger Pielke Jr., a professor of environmental studies at the University of Colorado, wrote a critical review of the book, saying that Epstein's arguments are based on faulty logic and that his observation that the Industrial Revolution was the result of fossil fuels does not support his conclusion that they are necessary in the future.

The conservative non-profit organization Capital Research Center praised this book, as did the Objectivist Ayn Rand Institute. A review in City Journal, a publication of the conservative think-tank the Manhattan Institute for Policy Research, praised the way the book celebrated the achievements of fossil fuels but criticized it for creating a false dichotomy. Sources from within the fossil fuel industry, meanwhile, were universally positive in their reception of Epstein's work.

== See also ==
- The Skeptical Environmentalist
- Global Crises, Global Solutions
- Cool It: The Skeptical Environmentalist's Guide to Global Warming
