= Copenhagen Consensus Center =

American nonprofit think tank

- Formation: 2002
- Type: Nonprofit think tank
- Headquarters: Tewksbury, MA, United States
- President and Founder: Bjørn Lomborg
- Key people: Roland Mathiasson; Scott Calahan; Loretta Michaels
- Revenue: $2,940,257 (2015)
- Expenses: $1,947,489 (2015)
- Website: copenhagenconsensus.com

The Copenhagen Consensus Center is a US non-profit think tank based in Lowell, Massachusetts, founded and headed by Bjørn Lomborg. The Center organizes the Copenhagen Consensus, a conference of economists held every four years, where potential solutions to global issues are examined and prioritized using cost-benefit analysis.

The most recent Copenhagen Consensus titled the Post-2015 Consensus was held in 2015. It focused on the costs and benefits of the 169 global development targets of the United Nations' Global Goals. The Post-2015 Consensus brought together an expert panel of economists including two Nobel Laureates who reviewed the research produced by the project and identified 19 targets that represent the best value-for-money in development over the period 2016 to 2030, offering more than $15 back on every dollar invested.

Recently, the Copenhagen Consensus Center has refocused its efforts into nationally oriented research, and is currently working extensively in Haiti and Bangladesh, while also planning expansion to India.

== History ==
The Center was originally formed in 2006 in Copenhagen, funded by the Danish government, with Lomborg as director. This came two years after Lomborg's first Copenhagen Consensus conference in 2004. The Center was tasked with organizing future conferences, and with expanding on the mandate of the Environmental Assessment Institute, a research body for environmental impact assessment under the Danish Ministry of the Environment, of which Lomborg had been director since its inception in 2002, until his resignation in 2004.

Government funding of £1m annually was reported as the primary income, with some private funding from benefactors that included the Carlsberg Group and the EU. In 2012, Denmark withdrew its funding, and the Center faced imminent closure. Lomborg left the country and reconstituted the Center as a US non-profit organization, based in Lowell, Massachusetts. In fact the address is a post box, and at this time, the actual location of its operations remains unverified.

== Activities ==
The Center conducts economic research and promotes the results. It performs cause prioritization for global human welfare concerns by "[synthesizing] expert opinion and research in the fields of development economics and welfare economics." Results are ranked according to what seems most cost-effective, and the outcomes are intensively disseminated with the intention of influencing global leaders. The Center publishes reports and volumes of collected works, organizes high-level brainstorming projects, like the flagship Copenhagen Consensus and conducts country-specific projects.

=== Conferences ===
The Center organizes conferences where guest economists analyze and prioritize solutions to problems. These have included the second and third editions of the original Copenhagen Consensus.

=== Country-specific projects ===
For more than a decade, the Copenhagen Consensus approach has been applied at a global level. In 2015 The Copenhagen Consensus Center launched the Bangladesh Priorities project, the flagship country-specific project to apply the Copenhagen Consensus approach on a national scale. The project sought to answer the question: what should the top priorities for policymakers, international donors, NGOs, and businesses be in order to do the most good in Bangladesh for each taka spent.

In 2016 the Copenhagen Consensus center launched its second country-specific project, this time focused on priorities for Haiti. The project was completed in October 2017.

In 2017 the project, India Consensus, was launched to research priorities for the Indian states of Rajasthan and Andhra Pradesh.

== Views on climate change ==
According to DeSmog, the Center does not dispute the scientific consensus on climate change, but does not support sharp reductions in greenhouse gas emissions. A 2014 paper assessing climate change was criticized by several experts in the field claiming that it underestimates the harm and misrepresents the papers cited.

== Publications ==
The Center publishes collections of its research papers, labeled textbooks, usually through Cambridge University Press, Lomborg's publisher for The Skeptical Environmentalist.

- Lomborg, Bjørn (ed.). Global Crises, Global Solutions, Cambridge University Press, November 2004.
- Lomborg, Bjørn (ed.). How to Spend $50 Billion to Make the World a Better Place, Cambridge University Press, June 2006.
- Lomborg, Bjørn (ed.). Solutions for the World's Biggest Problems: Costs and Benefits, Cambridge University Press, November 2007.
- Lomborg, Bjørn (ed.). Global Crises, Global Solutions: Costs and Benefits (2nd ed.), Cambridge University Press, July 2009.
- Lomborg, Bjørn (ed.). Latin American Development Priorities: Costs and Benefits, Cambridge University Press, February 2010.
- Lomborg, Bjørn. Smart Solutions to Climate Change: Comparing Costs and Benefits, Cambridge University Press, October 2010.
- Lomborg, Bjørn. How to Spend $75 Billion to Make the World a Better Place, Copenhagen Consensus Center, 2012.
- Lomborg, Bjørn (ed.). RethinkHIV: Smarter Ways to Invest in Ending HIV in Sub-Saharan Africa, Cambridge University Press, November 2012.
- Lomborg, Bjørn (ed.). How Much Have Global Problems Cost the World?: A Scorecard from 1900 to 2050, Cambridge University Press, October 2013.
- Lomborg, Bjørn (ed.). Global Problems, Smart Solutions: Costs and Benefits, Cambridge University Press, December 2013.
- Lomborg, Bjørn. How to Spend $75 Billion to Make the World a Better Place (2nd ed.), Copenhagen Consensus Center, 2014.
- Lomborg, Bjørn (ed.). Prioritizing The World, Copenhagen Consensus Center, 2014.
- Lomborg, Bjørn. The Nobel Laureates' Guide To The Smartest Targets For The World, Copenhagen Consensus Center, 2015.

== Funding ==
The Center is a US 501(c)(3) tax-exempt registered non-profit corporation and accepts donations. Funding sources have not been disclosed, apart from a statement that the Center does not accept donations from fossil fuel companies, though it does accept fees. DeSmogBlog has identified some of the funding sources.

== Bibliography ==
- Essunger, Paulina (2010). Why Bjorn Lomborg is the dunces hat for Copenhagen Conservatives. ThinkProgress, 13 December 2010. Retrieved 2014-11-26. (Archived by WebCite®)
- Hurford, Peter, and Andreas Mogensen (2013). "Smart Development Goals: A Promising Opportunity to Influence Aid Spending via Post-MDGs? An Evaluation of 'Copenhagen Consensus Centre'",
