= Cool It =

Cool It may refer to:

- Cool It: The Skeptical Environmentalist's Guide to Global Warming, a 2007 book by the Danish statistician and political scientist Bjørn Lomborg
- Cool It (film), a 2010 documentary film based on the above book
- Cool It (TV series), a 1980s British television comedy series featuring Phil Cool
- "Cool It", 2018 song by Spice from the mixtape Captured

== See also ==
- "Cool It Now", a 1984 single by New Edition
- Cool It Reba, an American No Wave band
