= Daphne Greenwood =

American politician and academic

Daphne Greenwood is a college professor and former state legislator in Colorado. She is a Democrat and served in the Colorado House of Representatives from 1991–1994 after defeating Republican incumbent Barbara Phillips in 1990. She was a candidate for State Treasurer in 1994.

She came to Colorado in 1980 to teach at the University of Colorado Colorado Springs and is noted as having reviewed a book by Bjorn Lomborg.
