= UVVU =

- Udvalgene vedrørende Videnskabelig Uredelighed
- UltraViolet (system)
