= Jeffrey Harvey =

Jeffrey Harvey may refer to:

- Jeffrey A. Harvey (born 1955), professor of physics and string theorist at University of Chicago
- Jeffrey Harvey (biologist) (born 1957), biologist at the Netherlands Institute of Ecology

== See also ==
- Geoff Harvey (1935–2019), English-Australian musician
