= DCSD =

DCSD may refer to:

- Danish Committees on Scientific Dishonesty
- Davenport Community School District
- Decorah Community School District
- DeKalb County School District
- Duchesne County School District
