= Bjørn Lomborg =

Danish author (born 1965)

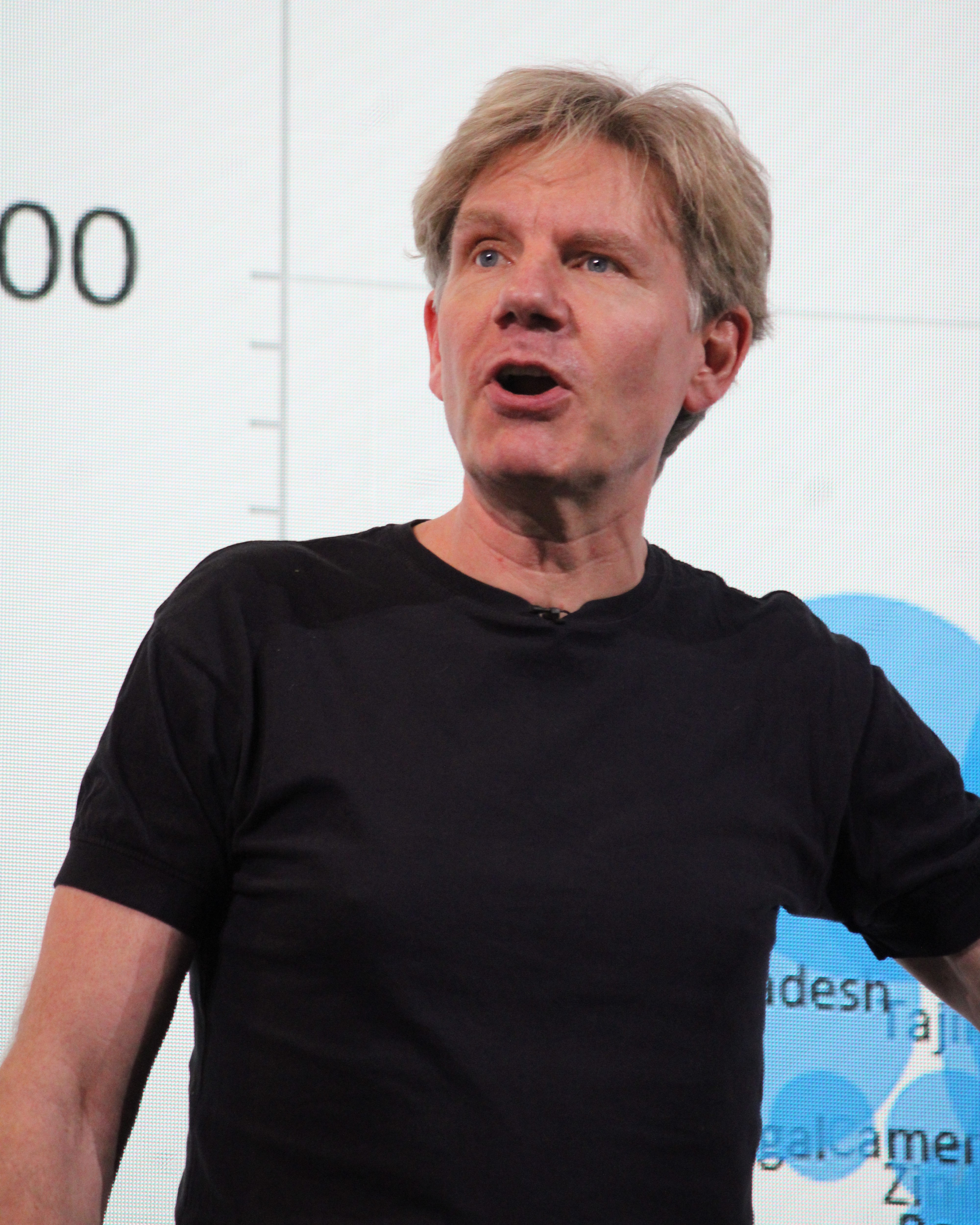
- Lomborg in 2025
- Education: University of Georgia; Aarhus University (MA); University of Copenhagen (PhD)
- Occupations: Author, think tank director
- Scientific career
- Fields: Political science, environmental economics
- Workplaces: Aarhus University, Environmental Assessment Institute, Hoover Institution, Copenhagen Consensus Center
- Thesis: Simulating social science: the iterated prisoner's dilemma and computer simulations in political science (1994)
- Website: lomborg.com

Bjørn Lomborg (Danish: [ˈpjɶɐ̯ˀn ˈlɔmˌpɒˀ]) is a Danish political scientist and climate change sceptic. He is the former director of the defunct Danish government's Environmental Assessment Institute (EAI) in Copenhagen, now the president of the Copenhagen Consensus Center, a think tank.

He became internationally known for his best-selling book The Skeptical Environmentalist (2001). In 2002, Lomborg and the Environmental Assessment Institute founded the Copenhagen Consensus. In his subsequent book, Cool It (2007), and its film adaptation, Lomborg outlined his views on global warming, many of which contradict the scientific consensus on climate change. These views include the claim that the negative impacts are overstated and the opinion that too much emphasis is put on climate change mitigation at the expense of climate change adaptation. Lomborg agrees that global warming is real and man-made and will have a serious impact.

In 2004, he was listed as one of Time's 100 most influential people.

Lomborg's views and work have attracted scrutiny from the scientific community. He was formally accused of scientific misconduct over the book The Skeptical Environmentalist, but in 2008 the Danish Committees on Scientific Dishonesty (DSCD) concluded in an evaluation of the book that "one couldn't prove that Lomborg had deliberately been scientifically dishonest, although he had broken the rules of scientific practice in that he interpreted results beyond the conclusions of the authors he cited". The Danish Ministry of Science, Technology and Innovation criticised the procedural aspects of the DCSD investigation. His positions on climate change have been challenged by experts and characterised as cherry picking.

== Education ==
Lomborg was an undergraduate at the University of Georgia, earned an M.A. degree in political science at the Aarhus University in 1991, and a PhD degree in political science at the University of Copenhagen in 1994.

== Career ==
Lomborg lectured in statistics in the Department of Political Science at the Aarhus University as an assistant professor (1994–1996) and associate professor (1997–2005). He left the university in February 2005 and in May of that year became an adjunct professor in Policy-making, Scientific Knowledge and the Role of Experts at the Department of Management, Politics and Philosophy, Copenhagen Business School.

Early in his career, his professional areas of interest lay in the simulation of strategies in collective action dilemmas, simulation of party behavior in proportional voting systems, and the use of surveys in public administration. In 1996, Lomborg's paper, "Nucleus and Shield: Evolution of Social Structure in the Iterated Prisoner's Dilemma", was published in the academic journal American Sociological Review.

Later, Lomborg's interests shifted to the use of statistics in the environmental arena. In 1998, Lomborg published four essays about the state of the environment in the leading Danish newspaper Politiken, which according to him "resulted in a firestorm debate spanning over 400 articles in major metropolitan newspapers." This led to the Skeptical Environmentalist, whose English translation was published as a work in environmental economics by Cambridge University Press in 2001. The book brought him international prominence as an opponent of the scientific consensus on climate change. He later edited Global Crises, Global Solutions, which presented the first conclusions of the Copenhagen Consensus, published in 2004 by the Cambridge University Press. In 2007, he authored a book entitled Cool It: The Skeptical Environmentalist's Guide to Global Warming.

In March 2002, the newly elected center-right prime minister, Anders Fogh Rasmussen, appointed Lomborg to run Denmark's new Environmental Assessment Institute (EAI). On 22 June 2004, he resigned from this post to go back to the Aarhus University, saying his work at the institute was done and that he could better serve the public debate from the academic sector. As of 2020, Lomborg is a visiting Fellow at the Hoover Institution, a conservative think tank. In 2023 he was a mainstage speaker at the inaugural Alliance for Responsible Citizenship.

== Books ==
=== The Skeptical Environmentalist ===
In 2001, he published The Skeptical Environmentalist, whose main thesis is that many of the most-publicized claims and predictions on environmental issues are wrong. The book received negative reviews among the scientific community, including from the Union of Concerned Scientists, Nature and Scientific American, with many scientists criticising its assertions as poorly supported, selectively using data and misrepresenting sources. However, it was well received in popular media and brought Lomborg to international attention.

==== Formal accusations of scientific dishonesty ====
Lomborg in 2014

After the publication of The Skeptical Environmentalist, Lomborg was formally accused of scientific dishonesty by a group of environmental scientists, who brought a total of three complaints against him to the Danish Committees on Scientific Dishonesty (DCSD), a body under Denmark's Ministry of Science, Technology and Innovation (MSTI). Lomborg was asked whether he regarded the book as a "debate" publication, and thereby not under the purview of the DCSD, or as a scientific work; he chose the latter, clearing the way for the inquiry that followed. The charges claimed that The Skeptical Environmentalist contained deliberately misleading data and flawed conclusions. Due to the similarity of the complaints, the DCSD decided to proceed on the three cases under one investigation.

In January 2003, the DCSD released a ruling that sent a mixed message, finding the book to be scientifically dishonest through misrepresentation of scientific facts, but Lomborg himself not guilty due to his lack of expertise in the fields in question. That February, Lomborg filed a complaint against the decision with the MSTI, which had oversight over the DCSD. In December, 2003, the Ministry annulled the DCSD decision, citing procedural errors, including lack of documentation of errors in the book, and asked the DCSD to re-examine the case. In March 2004, the DCSD formally decided not to act further on the complaints, reasoning that renewed scrutiny would, in all likelihood, result in the same conclusion.

The original DCSD decision about Lomborg provoked a petition signed by 287 Danish academics, primarily social scientists, who criticized the DCSD for evaluating the book as a work of science, whereas the petitioners considered it clearly an opinion piece by a non-scientist. The Danish Minister of Science, Technology, and Innovation then asked the Danish Research Agency (DRA) to form an independent working group to review DCSD practices. In response to this, another group of Danish scientists collected over 600 signatures, primarily from the medical and natural sciences community, to support the continued existence of the DCSD and presented their petition to the DRA.

=== Cool It ===
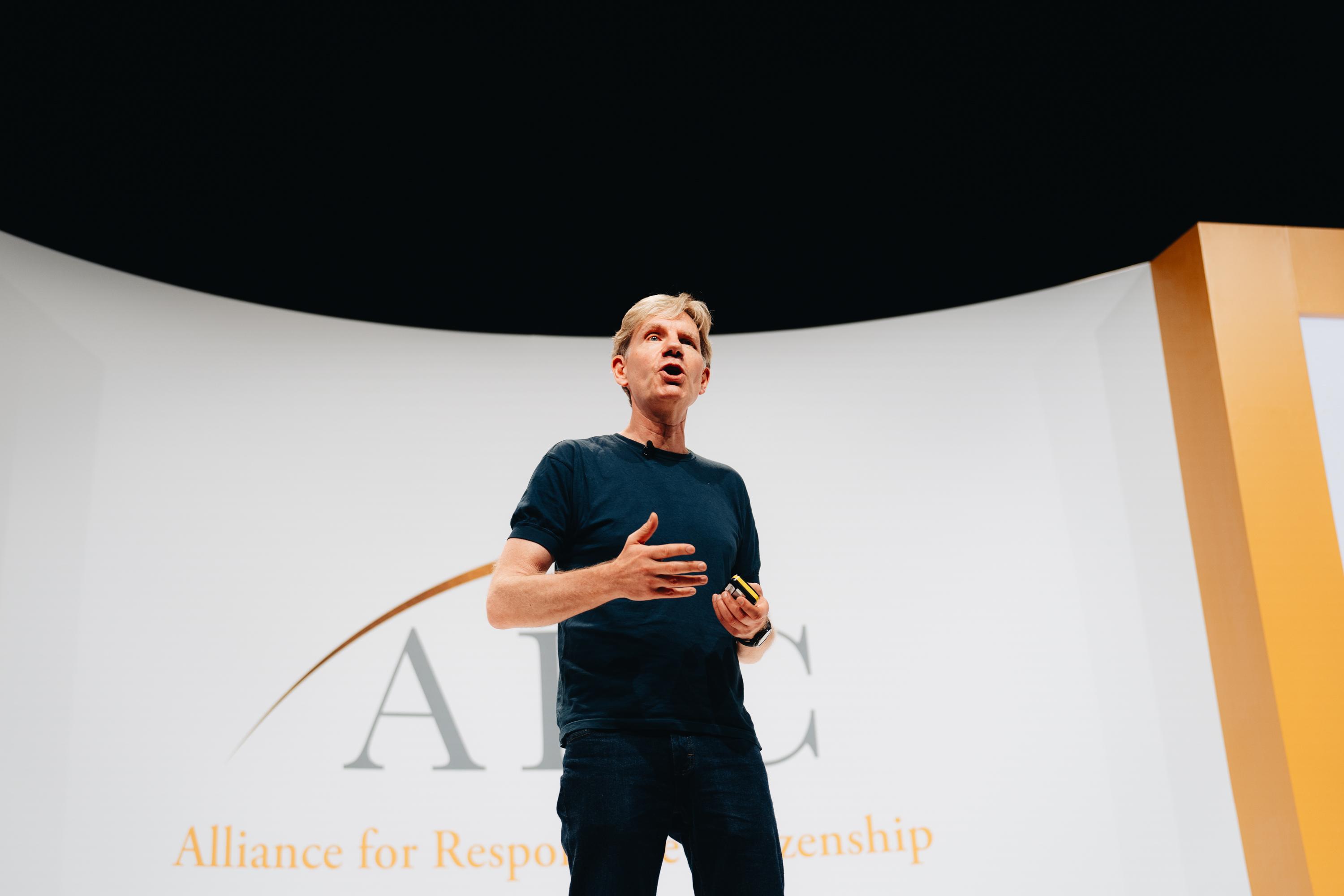
Lomborg speaking at the Alliance for Responsible Citizenship, London, 2023

Lomborg's follow-up to The Skeptical Environmentalist, Cool It: The Skeptical Environmentalist's Guide to Global Warming, was published in 2007. In it, Lomborg expanded on his views of climate change. Lomborg starts with the premise "Global warming is real and man-made. It will have a serious impact on humans and the environment toward the end of this century." Lomborg argues at length that warming will result in reducing total deaths from extreme temperatures, due to warming in cold climates. The main theme is that then-current approaches for addressing climate change, such as the Kyoto Protocol on reducing greenhouse gas emissions, were not economically cost-effective.

The Lomborg Deception, a 2010 Yale University Press book by Howard Friel, analyzed the ways in which Lomborg has "selectively used (and sometimes distorted) the available evidence", and alleged that the sources Lomborg provided in the footnotes did not support and, in some cases directly contradicted, Lomborg's assertions in the text of the book. Lomborg denied those claims in a 27-page argument-by-argument response. Friel wrote a reply to that response, in which he admitted two errors but otherwise rejected Lomborg's arguments.

==== Documentary film ====
Bjørn Lomborg was the subject of documentary feature film Cool It, adapted from his book of the same name. It was released on 12 November 2010 in the US. The film in part explicitly challenged Al Gore's 2006 Oscar-winning environmental awareness documentary, An Inconvenient Truth." The film received a media critic collective rating of 51% from Rotten Tomatoes and 61% from Metacritic.

== Copenhagen Consensus ==
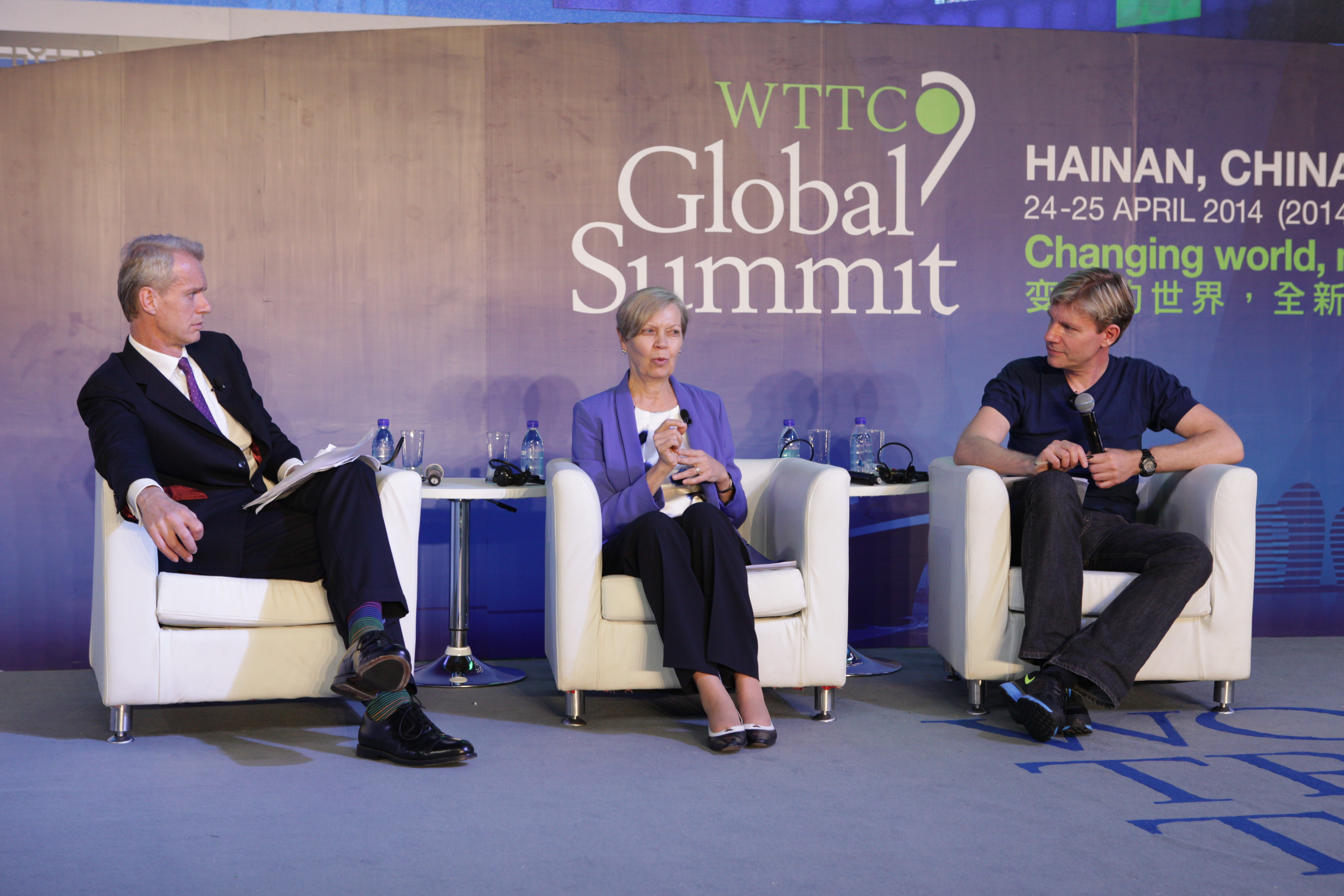
Lomborg (right) with DeAnne Julius (center) and Stephen Sackur (left), at WTTC Global Summit 2014

Lomborg and the Environmental Assessment Institute founded the Copenhagen Consensus in 2002, which seeks to establish priorities for advancing global welfare using methodologies based on the theory of welfare economics. A panel of prominent economists was assembled to evaluate and rank a series of problems every four years. The project was funded largely by the Danish government and was co-sponsored by The Economist. A book summarizing the conclusions of the economists' first assessment, Global Crises, Global Solutions, edited by Lomborg, was published in October 2004 by Cambridge University Press.

In 2006, Lomborg became director of the newly established Copenhagen Consensus Center, a Danish government-funded institute intended to build on the mandate of the EAI, and expand on the original Copenhagen Consensus conference. Denmark withdrew its funding in 2012 and the Center faced imminent closure. Lomborg left the country and reconstituted the Center as a non-profit organization in the United States. The Center was based out of a "Neighborhood Parcel Shipping Center" in Lowell, Massachusetts, though Lomborg himself was based in Prague in the Czech Republic. In 2015, Lomborg described the center's funding as "a little more than $1m a year ... from private donations", of which Lomborg himself was paid $775,000 in 2012.

=== Australian Consensus Centre ===
In 2014, the Australian Government offered the University of Western Australia $4 million to establish a "consensus centre", with Lomborg as director. The university accepted the offer, setting off a firestorm of opposition from its faculty and students, and from climate scientists around the world. In April 2015, the university reversed the decision and rejected the offer. The government continued to seek a sponsor for the proposed institution. On 21 October 2015, the offered funding was withdrawn. In April 2015, it was announced that an alliance between the Copenhagen Consensus Center and the University of Western Australia would see the establishment of the Australian Consensus Centre, a new policy research center at the UWA Business School. The university described the center's goals as a "focus on applying an economic lens to proposals to achieve good for Australia, the region and the world, prioritizing those initiatives which produce the most social value per dollar spent.". This appointment came under intense scrutiny, particularly when leaked documents revealed that the Australian government had approached UWA and offered to fund the Consensus Centre, information subsequently confirmed by a senior UWA lecturer. Reports indicated that Prime Minister Tony Abbott's office was directly responsible for Lomborg's elevation. $4 million of the total funding for the center was to be provided by the Australian federal government, with UWA not contributing any funding for the centre.

On 8 May 2015, UWA cancelled the contract for hosting the Australian Consensus Centre as "the proposed centre was untenable and lacked academic support". The Australian federal education minister, Christopher Pyne, said that he would find another university to host the ACC.

In July 2015, Flinders University senior management began quietly canvassing its staff about a plan to host the renamed Lomborg Consensus Centre at the university, likely in the Faculty of Social and Behavioural Sciences. A week later the story was broken on Twitter by the NTEU (National Tertiary Education Union) and Scott Ludlam. The story appeared the next day in The Australian, but described as "academic conversations" with no mention of Bjorn Lomborg's involvement and portrayed as a grassroots desire for the centre by the university. The following week, a story appeared in The Guardian quoting two Flinders University academics and an internal document demonstrating staff's withering rejection of the idea. Flinders staff and students vowed to fight against the establishment of any Centre or any partnership with Lomborg, citing his lack of scientific credibility, his lack of academic legitimacy and the political nature of the process of establishing the centre with the Abbott federal government. The Australian Youth Climate Coalition and 350.org launched a national campaign to support staff and students in their rejection of Lomborg.

On 21 October 2015, education minister Simon Birmingham told a senate committee the offered funding had been withdrawn. It was subsequently unclear whether the Australian Government would honour its original commitment and transfer the funds directly to the centre to cover the costs incurred.

== Views on climate change ==
Visualisation of the global warming "hiatus", which Lomborg highlighted in the 2010s

Lomborg has set out his views on climate change in several books, articles, interviews, and opinion pieces. At the time of his entry into the public debate in Denmark in 1998, he characterized the greenhouse effect as "highly questionable." Lomborg has later acknowledged that climate change is occurring and humans are responsible, but disputes that the effects and economic impacts will be negative. He argues that finances should be spent elsewhere, rather than on mitigation. He does not support solar panels, saying they are "inefficient", which is "why you have to subsidise them". According to Reuters, "many nations, especially in the developing world where food and water supplies are most vulnerable to climate shifts projected by the U.N. panel of climate scientists, reject Lomborg’s views" that investment into technology is an adequate response to climate change. He has opposed the Kyoto Protocol and called the Paris Agreement a "charade". He has been accused of exaggerating the economic costs of climate change mitigation policies.

Several of Lomborg's articles, in newspapers such as The Wall Street Journal and The Daily Telegraph, have been checked by Climate Feedback, a worldwide network of scientists who assess the credibility of influential climate change media coverage. The Climate Feedback reviewers assessed that the scientific credibility of the articles ranged between "low" and "very low". The Climate Feedback reviewers came to the conclusion that in one case, Lomborg "practices cherry picking"; in a second case, he "had reached his conclusions through cherry-picking from a small subset of the evidence, misrepresenting the results of existing studies, and relying on flawed reasoning"; in a third case, "[his] article [is in] blatant disagreement with available scientific evidence, while the author does not offer adequate evidence to support his statements"; and in a fourth case, "The author, Bjorn Lomborg, cherry-picks this specific piece of research and uses it in support of a broad argument against the value of climate policy. He also misrepresents the Paris Agreement to downplay its potential to curb future climate change."

== Personal life ==
Lomborg is gay and a vegetarian. As a public figure he has been a participant in information campaigns in Denmark about homosexuality, and states that "Being a public gay is to my view a civic responsibility. It's important to show that the width of the gay world cannot be described by a tired stereotype, but goes from leather gays on parade-wagons to suit-and-tie yuppies in boardrooms, as well as everything in between".

== Recognition and awards ==
- The Global Leaders of Tomorrow (Class 2002) – World Economic Forum (2002)
- The Stars of Europe (category: Agenda Setters) – BusinessWeek (17 June 2002): "No matter what they think of his views, nobody denies that Bjorn Lomborg has shaken the environmental movement to its core."
- The 2004 Time 100 (in Scientists & Thinkers) – Time (26 April 2004): "Our list of the most influential people in the world today: He just might be the Martin Luther of the environmental movement."
- Top 100 Public Intellectuals Poll (#14) Foreign Policy and Prospect (2005)
- Top 100 Public Intellectuals Poll (#41) Foreign Policy and Prospect (2008)
- 50 people who could save the planet – The Guardian (5 January 2008)
- Glocal Hero Award – Transatlantyk – Poznań International Film and Music Festival (2011)
- FP Top 100 Global Thinkers – Foreign Policy (2012): "For taking the black and white out of climate politics"

== Discussions in the media ==
After the release of The Skeptical Environmentalist in 2001, Lomborg was subjected to intense scrutiny and criticism in the media. As in the scientific community, his scientific qualifications and integrity were criticized, although some popular media outlets supported him. The verdict of the Danish Committees for Scientific Dishonesty fueled this debate and brought it into the spotlight of international mass media. By the end of 2003 Lomborg had become an international celebrity, with frequent appearances on radio, television and print media around the world. He is also a regular contributor to Project Syndicate since 2005.

- Scientific American published criticism of Lomborg's book. Lomborg responded on his own website, quoting the article at such length that Scientific American threatened to sue for copyright infringement. Lomborg eventually removed the rebuttal from his website; it was later published in PDF format on Scientific American's site. The magazine also printed a response to the rebuttal.
- The Economist defended Lomborg, claiming the panel of experts that had criticized Lomborg in Scientific American was both biased and did not actually counter Lomborg's book. The Economist argued that the panel's opinion had come under no scrutiny at all, and that Lomborg's responses had not been reported.
- Penn & Teller: Bullshit! — the U.S. Showtime television programme featured an episode entitled "Environmental Hysteria" in which Lomborg criticized what he claimed was environmentalists' refusal to accept a cost–benefit analysis of environmental questions, and stressed the need to prioritise some issues above others.
- Rolling Stone stated, "Lomborg pulls off the remarkable feat of welding the techno-optimism of the Internet age with a lefty's concern for the fate of the planet."
- The Union of Concerned Scientists criticized The Skeptical Environmentalist, claiming it to be "seriously flawed and failing to meet basic standards of credible scientific analysis", accusing Lomborg of presenting data in a fraudulent way, using flawed logic and selectively citing non-peer-reviewed literature. The review was conducted by Peter Gleick, Jerry D. Mahlman, Edward O. Wilson, Thomas Lovejoy, Norman Myers, Jeff Harvey, and Stuart Pimm.
- The New York Times criticized False Alarm, stating "This book proves the aphorism that a little knowledge is dangerous. It's nominally about air pollution. It's really about mind pollution." The review was conducted by Nobel laureate Joseph Stiglitz.
- In January 2026, the Danish newspaper Politiken reported—based on newly released documents from the U.S. Department of Justice—that Lomborg had a scheduled one-hour meeting with Jeffrey Epstein at Epstein's New York residence on 25 September 2012, arranged by Lomborg's literary agent John Brockman. According to a written statement from Lomborg's manager quoted by the paper, the conversation concerned philanthropic funding, Lomborg was not aware at the time of Epstein's earlier conviction, and there was no further contact after the meeting.

== Publications ==
- "Nucleus and Shield: Evolution of Social Structure in the Iterated Prisoner's Dilemma", American Sociological Review, 1996.
- The Skeptical Environmentalist: Measuring the Real State of the World. Cambridge University Press. 2001. ISBN 0521010683.
- Global Crises, Global Solutions, Copenhagen Consensus, Cambridge University Press, 2004. ISBN 0521606144, as editor
- How to Spend $50 Billion to Make the World a Better Place, Cambridge University Press, 2006. ISBN 978-0521685719, as editor
- Solutions for the World's Biggest Problems – Costs and Benefits, Cambridge University Press, 2007. ISBN 978-0521715973, as editor
- Cool It: The Skeptical Environmentalist's Guide to Global Warming. Knopf Doubleday. 2007. ISBN 978-0307267795.
- Smart Solutions to Climate Change, Comparing Costs and Benefits, Cambridge University Press, 2010, ISBN 978-0521763424.
- The Nobel Laureates Guide to the Smartest Targets for the World 2016–2030, Copenhagen Consensus Center, 2015. ISBN 978-1940003115
- Prioritizing Development: A Cost Benefit Analysis of the United Nations' Sustainable Development Goals Cambridge University Press, 2018, ISBN 1108415458, as editor
- False Alarm: How Climate Change Panic Costs Us Trillions, Hurts the Poor, and Fails to Fix the Planet. Basic Books. 2020. ISBN 978-1541647480.
- "Thinking Smartly About Climate Change". Imprimis. 52 (4/5). Hillsdale, MI: Hillsdale College: 1–7. April–May 2023. ISSN 0277-8432.
- Best Things First: The 12 Most Efficient Solutions for the World's Poorest and Our Global SDG Promises, Copenhagen Consensus Center, 2023. ISBN 978-1940003481

== See also ==
- Global warming controversy
- Environmental skepticism
- Project Syndicate
- List of people who have been pied
