= Howard Friel =

American scholar and author

Howard Friel is an American scholar and author, who writes about foreign policy, public international law, international humanitarian law, human rights, civil liberties, and science-related issues. He wrote The Lomborg Deception: Setting the Record Straight About Global Warming (Yale University Press, 2010, ISBN 978-0-300-16103-8), a critique of Bjørn Lomborg's books The Skeptical Environmentalist and Cool It: The Skeptical Environmentalist's Guide to Global Warming.

He also co-authored Israel-Palestine on Record: How the New York Times Misreports Conflict in the Middle East with Richard Falk (Verso, 2007). He co-authored The Record of the Paper: How the New York Times Misreports US Foreign Policy with Richard Falk (Verso, 2004, ISBN 978-1-84467-019-2).

In 1995, Friel edited Guns and the Constitution: The Myth of Second Amendment Protection for Firearms in America with Dennis Henigan.
