= Alex Epstein (author) =

American writer and energy policy commentator

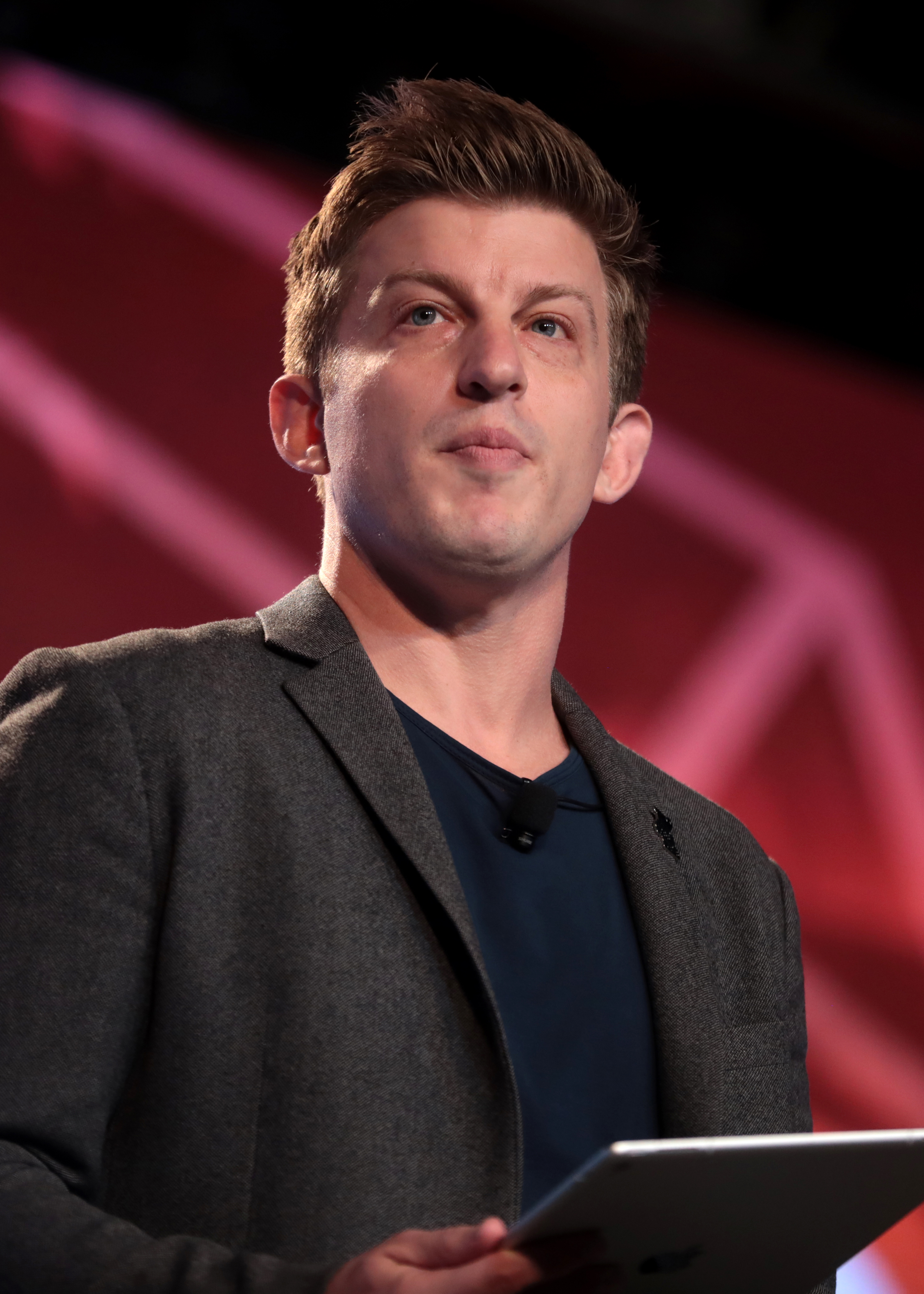
- Epstein in 2018
- Education: Duke University (BA)
- Occupations: Author and policy social commentator
- Writing career
- Subjects: Philosophy; ethics; energy; environment; industry; fossil fuels
- Notable works: The Moral Case for Fossil Fuels; Fossil Future
- Website: alexepstein.com

Alexander Joseph Epstein (/ˈɛpstaɪn/ EP-styne) is an American author who advocates for the benefits and use of fossil fuels. Epstein is the author of The Moral Case for Fossil Fuels (2014) and Fossil Future (2022).

He is a former adjunct scholar at Cato Institute, a libertarian think tank, and a former fellow at the Ayn Rand Institute.

Epstein's views on climate change are controversial. He agrees that climate change is largely human-caused but does not believe that widespread use of fossil fuels is an existential threat to humanity. Epstein argues that fossil fuels serve a useful role in mitigating the most negative effects of climate change—one example Epstein raises in his book, The Moral Case for Fossil Fuels, is that increasing use of fossil fuels can generate more cheap and abundant energy for more people, and that this allows for greater access to and lower cost of air conditioning, providing for enhanced availability of cooling in hotter climates.

Epstein also cites studies in support of using more fossil fuel generated energy for heat and climate controlling power generation to further improve standards of living, especially in extreme environments where "cold weather kills 20 times as many people as hot weather".

== Early life and education ==
Epstein grew up in Chevy Chase, Maryland, and attended Montgomery County Public Schools, where his favorite subjects were mathematics and science. He has said he was influenced by Ayn Rand, especially her novel Atlas Shrugged, and also Thomas Sowell.

He attended Duke University, where for two years he was editor and publisher of The Duke Review. He studied philosophy and computer science, graduating with a Bachelor of Arts.

Epstein wrote in 1999 in the Duke Review, a conservative college newspaper, that African countries are inferior to the West. The 1999 article was found by Documented, an investigative group, and reported by the Washington Post in April 2022. In a video response, Epstein denied racial biases but said, "Western culture is overall superior and certainly in terms of government historically, because it's really the birth of modern freedom."

== Career ==
=== Ayn Rand Institute ===
From 2004 to 2011, Epstein was a writer and fellow at the Ayn Rand Institute, a non-profit organization in Irvine, California, that promotes Ayn Rand's novels and Objectivism.

=== Center for Industrial Progress ===
Center for Industrial Progress
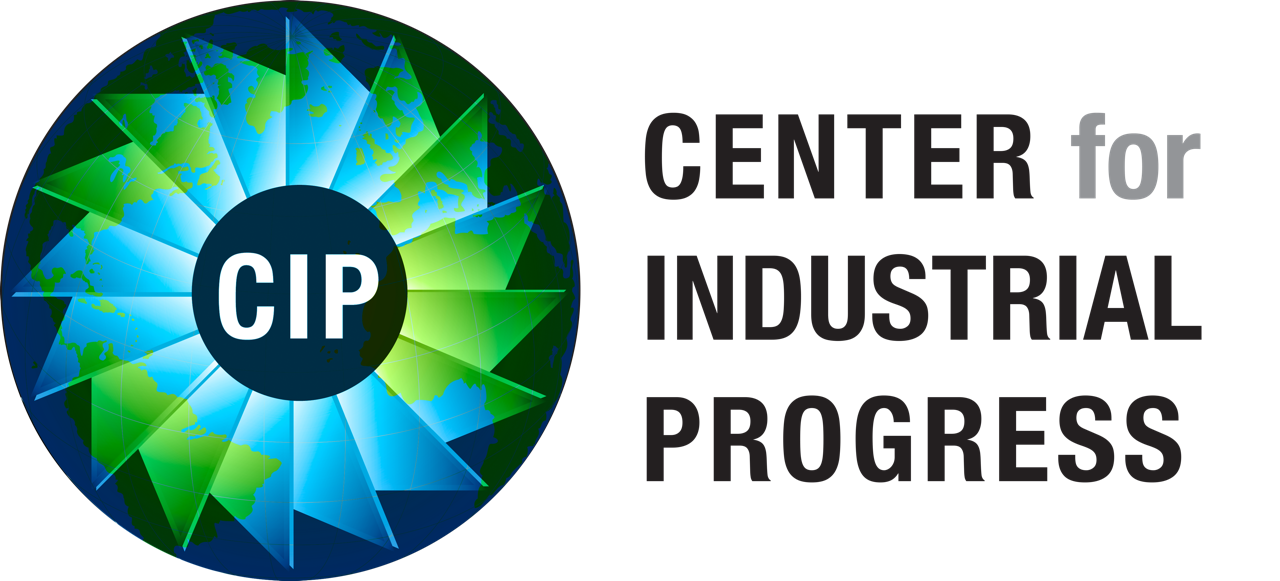
- Center for Industrial Progress logo
- Formation: 2011
- Purpose: Energy, industry, fossil fuels
- Headquarters: San Diego, California
- President: Alex Epstein
- Website: IndustrialProgress.com

Epstein founded the Center for Industrial Progress (CIP), an organization that he calls a "for-profit think tank", in 2011. According to Epstein, his list of clients has included the president of the Kentucky Coal Association and thecoaltruth.com, a project which Desmog tied to employees of Alliance Coal. Epstein's think-tank does not disclose its funding, although Epstein has received payment from fossil fuel companies for consulting services.

In 2013, Rolling Stone placed Epstein and the Center for Industrial Progress on its list of top global warming deniers. Epstein wrote a rebuttal in Forbes in which he denied being a climate change denier and rejected the term.

In 2014, Epstein and CIP publicly supported the Keystone Pipeline. He wrote The Moral Case for Fossil Fuels, which reached #17 on a list of bestselling science books in early December 2014. In the book he calls the idea that the majority of climate scientists agree that humans are causing climate change a "fabrication". A Foreign Policy review of the book found that it "doesn't engage with much of the relevant scientific context" and "paints a paranoid picture of a climate science that cannot be trusted".

In 2015, The Guardian published an opinion piece by Jason Wilson critical of Epstein and CIP, stating, "Epstein's work has been popular and influential on the right because it is a particularly fluent, elaborate form of climate denialism. The CIP prides itself on being able to train corporate leaders to 'successfully outmessage "environmentalists"'."

In 2016, Epstein testified before the Senate Environment and Public Works Committee at the invitation of the committee's chairman, James Inhofe (R-Okla.), who has called climate change a "hoax". Epstein suggested that rising carbon dioxide levels "benefit plants and Americans". When questioned by committee member Barbara Boxer (D-Calif.) as to why Epstein, whose academic training is in philosophy, was even there, Epstein responded, "to teach you how to think clearly." Boxer replied, "[Y]ou are a philosopher, not a scientist, and I don’t appreciate getting lectured by a philosopher about science".

Epstein opposed shutdowns in the early months of the COVID-19 pandemic in 2020 and compared the virus to the seasonal flu. Asked by The Guardian at the time about coal interests being among CIP's clients, Epstein said he advised them about messaging but that they did not influence his statements.

Epstein has contributed opinion pieces to several media outlets on climate and energy issues, including USA Today, The Wall Street Journal, The Washington Times, The Orange County Register, Fox News, and Forbes magazine.

In October 2023, Epstein spoke at the African Energy Week, an annual event organized by the African Energy Chamber. The event was protested by members of environmentalist group Extinction Rebellion. Following Epstein's speech, Professor Francois Engelbrecht stated that giving Epstein a prominent position at the African Energy Week was an insult to African countries, considering that the continent is disproportionately affected by climate change. He said that Epstein's discourse "only stands to benefit some African elites in the fossil fuels business, but at the cost of millions of people vulnerable to climate change."

== Published works ==
- Epstein, Alex (2013). Fossil Fuels Improve the Planet. Center for Industrial Progress. ISBN 9780989344807.
- Epstein, Alex (2014). The Moral Case for Fossil Fuels. Penguin. ISBN 9781591847441.
- Epstein, Alex (2022). Fossil Future: Why Global Human Flourishing Requires More Oil, Coal, and Natural Gas - Not Less. Penguin. ISBN 9780593420416.
