= The Moral Case for Fossil Fuels =

2014 book by Alex Epstein

- Author: Alex Epstein
- Language: English
- Subject: Fossil fuels
- Publisher: Portfolio Hardcover
- Publication date: November 13, 2014
- Publication place: United States
- Media type: Print
- Pages: 256 pages
- ISBN: 978-1591847441
- OCLC: 892514394

The Moral Case for Fossil Fuels is a 2014 book that advocates for the expansion of fossil fuels. Epstein runs the Center for Industrial Progress, a for-profit think tank.

== Reception ==
The book was a New York Times and Wall Street Journal bestseller.

The book received praise from publications such as The Wall Street Journal, Barron's, National Review, and The Morning Sun of Pittsburg, Kansas. However, the book's conclusions were criticized by Inside Higher Ed, The Huffington Post, The Guardian, and Our World, a publication of the United Nations University.

In 2014, Epstein was interviewed by Peter Thiel at an event hosted by the energy startup Tachyus. Thiel also provided a blurb for the book.

In December 2014, political commentator John McLaughlin called Epstein "most original thinker of the year" for his book during McLaughlin's yearly The McLaughlin Group roundup.

== See also ==
- Fossil Future
