= Robert O. Mendelsohn =

American economist

- Born: 1952 (age 73–74); New York City

Academic background
- Education: Yale University (Ph.D.); Harvard University (BA)

Academic work
- Discipline: Environmental economics
- Institutions: Yale University

Robert O. Mendelsohn (born 1952 in New York City) is an American environmental economist. He is currently the Edwin Weyerhaeuser Davis Professor of the School of Forestry and Environmental Studies at Yale University, Professor of Economics in Economics Department at Yale University and Professor in the School of Management at Yale University. Mendelsohn is a major figure in the economics of global warming, being for example a contributor to the first Copenhagen Consensus report. Mendelsohn received a BA in economics from Harvard University in 1973 and obtained his Ph.D. in economics from Yale University in 1978.

Mendelsohn has written over one hundred peer-reviewed articles and edited six books. The focus of his research has been the valuation of the environment. He has developed methods to value natural ecosystems including coral reefs, old-growth forests, non-timber forest products, ecotourism, and outdoor recreation. He has also developed methods to value pollution including emissions of criteria pollutants (such as particulates and sulfur dioxide) and hazardous waste sites. His most recent work values the impacts of greenhouse gases, including the effects of climate change on agriculture, forests, water resources, energy, and coasts. This research carefully integrates adaptation into impact assessment and has recently been extended to developing countries around the world. He has also been involved in studies of nonrenewable resources, forest management, and specifically carbon sequestration in forests.

== Academic interests ==
Mendelsohn's area of interest is resource economics, with special emphasis on valuing the environment. Over the last decade, he has been involved in measuring the impacts from climate change. Together with William Nordhaus and Daigee Shaw, they have invented the Ricardian technique, a cross-sectional analysis that reveals the climate sensitivity of agriculture. This method has been applied to the United States, Africa, Latin America, and other countries around the world. With Brent Sohngen, an ecological model of forests was combined with a dynamic economic model of the economy to predict a path of timber effects from climate change. With Wendy Morrison and Erin Mansur, cross-sectional information from households and firms was used to measure the impacts of climate change on energy. With James Neumann, Mendelsohn led a consortium of leading impact researchers on a complete study of the effect of climate change on the United States economy. With Joel Smith, he led another consortium to study the effects of climate change in California. With Ariel Dinar, Niggol Seo, Pradeep Kurukulasuriya, and a host of country collaborators in Africa and Latin America, they have completed a series of studies of the impact of climate change on agriculture in those two continents. The results of this research suggest that climate change will hit low latitude countries especially hard. It appears that these countries will bear the brunt of climate change impacts. They have also used these models to understand the dynamics of climate change impacts. The net harmful effects of climate change will only become evident in the second half of this century. Mendelsohn's research has also concluded that the positive effects of global warming in Canada—such as longer growing seasons and the opening of the Northwest Passage—would outweigh the negative effects.

Mendelsohn also remain engaged in valuing the conservation of ecosystems and especially temperate and tropical forests. Together with Brent Sohngen and Roger Sedjo, a global timber model has been completed that monitors timber supply over time. This model predicts what forests the timber market will need for supply and what forests can be left as “economic wilderness”. The model is also capable of analyzing the impacts of setting aside vast tracts of land on the forest fringe around the world. In addition to this modeling work, he is engaged in empirical studies with biologists and students that measure the value of leaving many forests intact for recreation, wildlife, and nontimber forest products. For example, with Chuck Peters and Al Gentry, they did the first study to measure the value of nontimber forest products in the Amazon. With Gardner Brown, they invented the hedonic travel cost method that measures the values of site characteristics such as old growth and fish populations.

The third thrust of Mendelsohn's research has focused on studying the impacts of air pollution. An integrated assessment model was used to make some of the first measurements of the damages of air pollution from stationary sources.

Working with Nicholas Muller, this model has been recently been extended to cover all air pollution sources in the United States. The research identifies which sources are causing the greatest damages. By comparing costs and benefits, air pollution regulators can improve the efficiency of current policies by recognizing the importance of location and matching marginal costs to marginal damages. New regulations can be designed to be far more efficient at reducing damages compared to current approaches including cap and trade. Along with William Nordhaus, the model has also been used to construct a green account that measure the role each industry plays in generating air pollution damages and compares these damages to their net value added.

== Other ==
Mendelsohn is also a fellow of Ezra Stiles College in Yale University.
