= Cool It (film) =

- Directed by: Ondi Timoner
- Written by: Terry Botwick; Sarah Gibson; Bjørn Lomborg; Ondi Timoner
- Based on: Cool It
- Produced by: Terry Botwick; Ondi Timoner
- Starring: Bjørn Lomborg
- Cinematography: Nasar Abich Jr.
- Edited by: Debra Light; Brian Singbiel; David Timoner
- Music by: N'oa Winter Lazerus; Sarah Schachner
- Production companies: Interloper Films; 1019 Entertainment
- Distributed by: Roadside Attractions
- Release date: November 12, 2010 (United States)
- Running time: 88 minutes
- Country: United States
- Language: English
- Box office: $62,713

Cool It is a 2010 documentary film directed by Ondi Timoner. It is based on the book Cool It: The Skeptical Environmentalist's Guide to Global Warming by Danish statistician Bjørn Lomborg. The film stars Lomborg, best known for authoring The Skeptical Environmentalist, and explores his views on global warming and criticisms of conventional mitigation approaches. It premiered in Canada at the 2010 Toronto International Film Festival and had a theatrical United States release on November 12, 2010.

Reception for the film was polarised, and it was criticised by the scientific community.

== Content ==
The film focuses on Lomborg lecturing and brainstorming ideas to shift the focus of the environmental movement what he believes to be more realistic, which includes de-emphasizing efforts to mitigate global warming. In the film, Lomborg argues the actual and predicted effects of climate change are exaggerated. Interviews include many scientists and activists both supporting and disputing Lomborg, including Paul Ehrlich, Lester R. Brown and Bill McKibben. It also explicitly challenges Al Gore's Oscar-winning environmental awareness documentary, An Inconvenient Truth (2006)."

== Critical reception and box office ==
While many non-scientist critics welcomed the upbeat, positive nature of the film, some scientific critiques noted some scientific inconsistency and glossing over of facts, a summary of which can be found on the Yale Climate Media forum.

The film received a media critic collective rating of 51% from Rotten Tomatoes and 61% from Metacritic. The Atlantic review by Clive Crook, who describes himself in the article as a "friend" of Lomborg and having taken "his side in the controversy that followed the publication of the Skeptical Environmentalist--a terrific book," called it "An urgent, intelligent, and entertaining account of the climate policy debate, with a strong focus on cost-effective solutions." Jeanette Catsoulis described it as "an engrossing, brain-tickling picture", although criticised its use of animations and conclusion. Justin Lowe in The Hollywood Reporter described the film as "A mix of interviews, location footage, animated sequences and archival material support Lomborg’s point of view, which Timoner treats without any noticeable skepticism, even including him as a co-writer on the script".

At the box office, Cool It 's US release grossed $62,713.
