= Copenhagen Consensus =

Welfare economics project

Copenhagen Consensus is a project that seeks to establish priorities for advancing global welfare using methodologies based on the theory of welfare economics, using cost–benefit analysis. It was conceived and organized around 2004 by Bjørn Lomborg, the author of The Skeptical Environmentalist and the then director of the Danish government's Environmental Assessment Institute.

The project is run by the Copenhagen Consensus Center, which is directed by Lomborg and was part of the Copenhagen Business School, but is now an independent 501(c)(3) non-profit organisation registered in the USA. The project considers possible solutions to a wide range of problems, presented by experts in each field. These are evaluated and ranked by a panel of economists. The emphasis is on rational prioritization by economic analysis. The panel is given an arbitrary budget constraint and instructed to use cost–benefit analysis to focus on a bottom line approach in solving/ranking presented problems. The approach is justified as a corrective to standard practice in international development, where, it is alleged, media attention and the "court of public opinion" results in priorities that are often far from optimal.

International relations scholar Peter Hough notes that the project is part of the "dwindling band of climate-change deniers" who have now changed their tune and modified their original arguments in the face of the scientific consensus on climate change, admitting that it is real and caused by CO_{2} emissions, but still arguing that concerns are exaggerated and that humans can adapt to the problem instead of mitigating it. Hough acknowledges that the concerns raised by the Copenhagen Consensus about how to direct aid are valid, but the majority of their arguments lack rigor, and many of their solutions, such as geoengineering, lack evidence.

== History ==
The project has held conferences in 2004, 2007, 2008, 2009, 2011 and 2012. The 2012 conference ranked bundled micronutrient interventions the highest priority, and the 2008 report identified supplementing vitamins for undernourished children as the world’s best investment. The 2009 conference, dealing specifically with global warming, proposed research into marine cloud whitening (ships spraying seawater into clouds to make them reflect more sunlight and thereby reduce temperature) as the top climate change priority, though climate change itself is ranked well below other world problems. In 2011 the Copenhagen Consensus Center carried out the Rethink HIV project together with the RUSH Foundation, to find smart solutions to the problem of HIV/AIDS. In 2007 looked into which projects would contribute most to welfare in Copenhagen Consensus for Latin America in cooperation with the Inter-American Development Bank.

The initial project was co-sponsored by the Danish government and The Economist. A book summarizing the Copenhagen Consensus 2004 conclusions, Global Crises, Global Solutions, edited by Lomborg, was published in October 2004 by Cambridge University Press, followed by the second edition published in 2009 based on the 2008 conclusions.

== Copenhagen Consensus 2012 ==
In May 2012, the third global Copenhagen Consensus was held, gathering economists to analyze the costs and benefits of different approaches to tackling the world‘s biggest problems. The aim was to provide an answer to the question: If you had $75bn for worthwhile causes, where should you start? A panel including four Nobel laureates met in Copenhagen, Denmark, in May 2012. The panel’s deliberations were informed by thirty new economic research papers that were written just for the project by scholars from around the world.

=== Economists ===
The panel members were the following, four of whom are Nobel Laureate economists.

- Robert Mundell
- Nancy Stokey
- Thomas Schelling
- Vernon Smith
- Finn Kydland

=== Challenges ===
- Armed conflict
- Biodiversity
- Chronic disease
- Climate Change
- Education
- Hunger and malnutrition
- Infectious disease
- Natural disasters
- Population growth
- Water and sanitation

In addition, the Center commissioned research on Corruption and trade barriers, but the Expert Panel did not rank these for Copenhagen Consensus 2012, because the solutions to these challenges are political rather than investment-related.

=== Outcome ===
Given the budget restraints, they found 16 investments worthy of investment (in descending order of desirability):

1. Bundled micronutrient interventions to fight hunger and improve education
2. Expanding the subsidy for malaria combination treatment
3. Expanded childhood immunization coverage
4. Deworming of schoolchildren, to improve educational and health outcomes
5. Expanding tuberculosis treatment
6. R&D to Increase yield enhancements, to decrease hunger, fight biodiversity destruction, and lessen the effects of climate change
7. Investing in effective early warning systems to protect populations against natural disaster
8. Strengthening surgical capacity
9. Hepatitis B immunization
10. Using low‐Cost drugs in the case of acute heart attacks in poorer nations (these are already available in developed countries)
11. Salt reduction campaign to reduce chronic disease
12. Geo‐engineering R&D into the feasibility of solar radiation management
13. Conditional cash transfer for school attendance
14. Accelerated HIV vaccine R&D
15. Extended field trial of information campaigns on the benefits from schooling
16. Borehole and public hand pump intervention

=== Slate ranking ===
During the days of the Copenhagen Consensus 2012 conference, a series of articles was published in Slate Magazine each about a challenge that was discussed, and Slate readers could make their own ranking, voting for the solutions which they thought were best. Slate readers' ranking corresponded with that of the Expert Panel on many points, including the desirability of bundled micronutrient intervention; however, the most striking difference was in connection with the problem of overpopulation. Family planning ranked highest on the Slate priority list, whereas it didn't feature in the top 16 of the Expert Panel's prioritisation.

== Copenhagen Consensus 2008 ==
=== Economists ===
Nobel Prize winners marked with (¤)

- Jagdish Bhagwati
- François Bourguignon
- Finn E. Kydland (¤)
- Robert Mundell (¤)
- Douglass North (¤)
- Vernon L. Smith (¤)
- Thomas Schelling (¤)
- Nancy Stokey

=== Results ===
In the Copenhagen Consensus 2008, the solutions for global problems have been ranked in the following order:

1. Micronutrient supplements for children (vitamin A and zinc)
2. The Doha development agenda
3. Micronutrient fortification (iron and salt iodization)
4. Expanded immunization coverage for children
5. Biofortification
6. Deworming and other nutrition programs at school
7. Lowering the price of schooling
8. Increase and improve girls’ schooling
9. Community-based nutrition promotion
10. Provide support for women’s reproductive role
11. Heart attack acute management
12. Malaria prevention and treatment
13. Tuberculosis case finding and treatment
14. R&D in low-carbon energy technologies
15. Bio-sand filters for household water treatment
16. Rural water supply
17. Conditional cash transfer
18. Peace-keeping in post-conflict situations
19. HIV combination prevention
20. Total sanitation campaign
21. Improving surgical capacity at district hospital level
22. Microfinance
23. Improved stove intervention to combat Air Pollution
24. Large, multipurpose dam in Africa
25. Inspection and maintenance of diesel vehicles
26. Low sulfur diesel for urban road vehicles
27. Diesel vehicle particulate control technology
28. Tobacco tax
29. R&D and carbon dioxide emissions reduction
30. Carbon dioxide emissions reduction

Unlike the 2004 results, these were not grouped into qualitative bands such as Good, Poor, etc.

Gary Yohe, one of the authors of the global warming paper, subsequently accused Lomborg of "deliberate distortion of our conclusions", adding that "as one of the authors of the Copenhagen Consensus Project's principal climate paper, I can say with certainty that Lomborg is misrepresenting our findings thanks to a highly selective memory". Kåre Fog further pointed out that the future benefits of emissions reduction were discounted at a higher rate than for any of the other 27 proposals, stating "so there is an obvious reason why the climate issue always is ranked last" in Lomborg's environmental studies.

In a subsequent joint statement settling their differences, Lomborg and Yohe agreed that the "failure" of Lomborg's emissions reduction plan "could be traced to faulty design".

== Climate Change Project ==
In 2009, the Copenhagen convened an expert panel specifically to examine solutions to climate change. The process was similar to the 2004 and 2008 Copenhagen Consensus, involving papers by specialists considered by a panel of economists. The panel ranked 15 solutions, of which the top 5 were:

1. Research into marine cloud whitening (involving ships spraying sea-water into clouds so as to reflect more sunlight and thereby reduce temperatures)
2. Technology-led policy response
3. Research into stratospheric aerosol injection (involving injected ?sulphur dioxide into the upper atmosphere to reduce sunlight)
4. Research into carbon storage
5. Planning for adaptation

The benefits of the number 1 solution are that if the research proved successful this solution could be deployed relatively cheaply and quickly. Potential problems include environmental impacts e.g. from changing rainfall patterns.

Measures to cut carbon and methane emissions, such as carbon taxes, came bottom of the results list, partly because they would take a long time to have much effect on temperatures.

== Copenhagen Consensus 2004 ==
=== Process ===
Eight economists met May 24–28, 2004 at a roundtable in Copenhagen. A series of background papers had been prepared in advance to summarize the current knowledge about the welfare economics of 32 proposals ("opportunities") from 10 categories ("challenges"). For each category, one assessment article and two critiques were produced. After a closed-door review of the background papers, each of the participants gave economic priority rankings to 17 of the proposals (the rest were deemed inconclusive).

=== Economists ===
- Jagdish Bhagwati
- Robert Fogel
- Bruno Frey
- Justin Yifu Lin
- Douglass North
- Thomas Schelling
- Vernon L. Smith
- Nancy Stokey

=== Challenges ===
Below is a list of the 10 challenge areas and the author of the paper on each. Within each challenge, 3–4 opportunities (proposals) were analyzed:

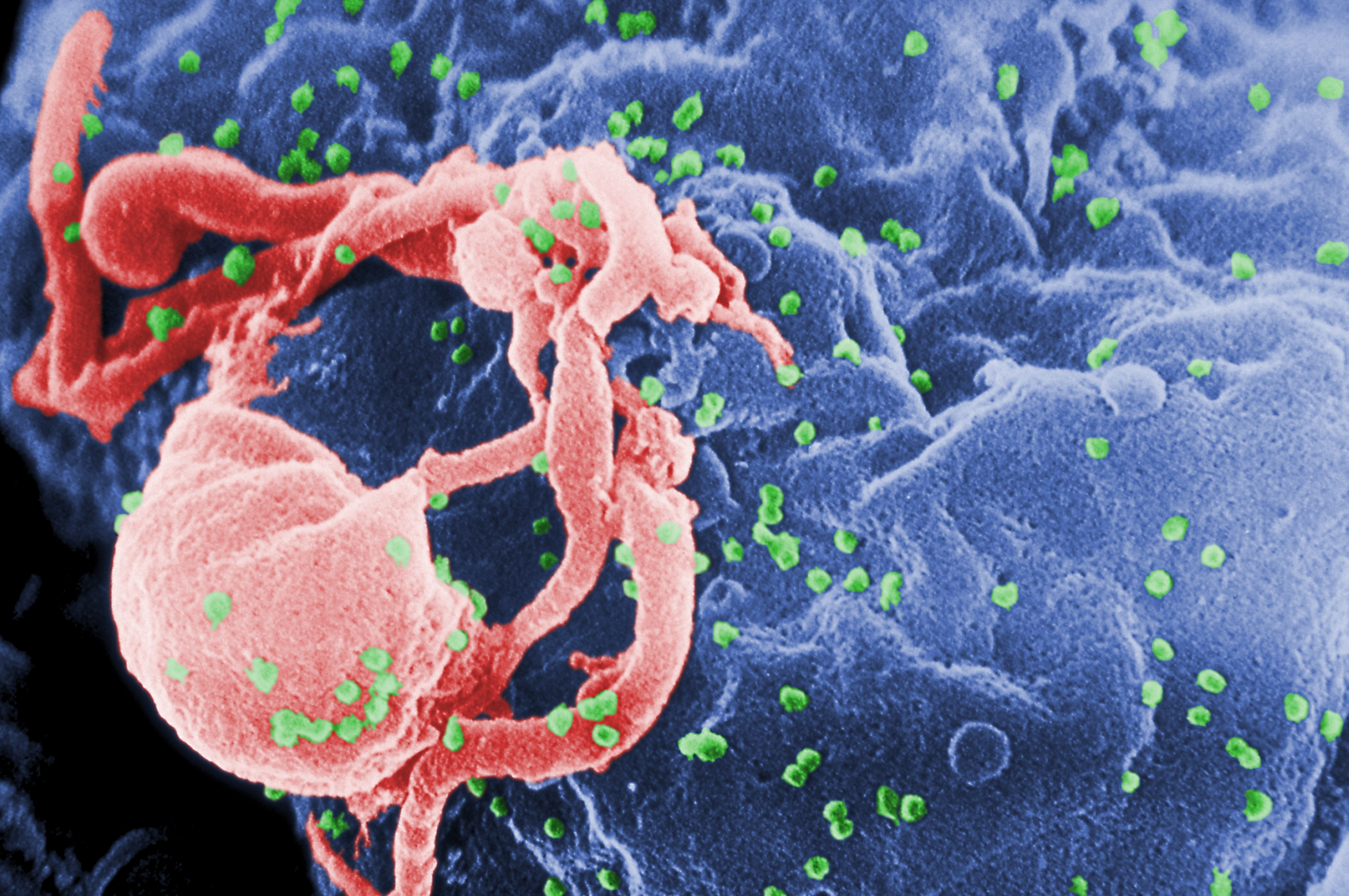
Preventing spread of HIV

- Communicable diseases (Anne Mills)
- Conflicts (Paul Collier)
- Education (Lant Pritchett)
- Financial instability (Barry Eichengreen)
- Global Warming sometimes also called Climate change (William R. Cline)
- Government and corruption (Susan Rose-Ackerman)
- Malnutrition and hunger (Jere Behrman)
- Population: migration (Phillip L. Martin)
- Sanitation and water (Frank Rijsberman)
- Subsidies and trade barriers (Kym Anderson)

=== Results ===
The panel agreed to rate seventeen of the thirty-two opportunities within seven of the ten challenges. The rated opportunities were further classified into four groups: Very Good, Good, Fair and Bad; all results are based using cost–benefit analysis.

==== Very good ====
The highest priority was assigned to implementing certain new measures to prevent the spread of HIV and AIDS. The economists estimated that an investment of $27 billion could avert nearly 30 million new infections by 2010.

Policies to reduce malnutrition and hunger were chosen as the second priority. Increasing the availability of micronutrients, particularly reducing iron deficiency anemia through dietary supplements, was judged to have an exceptionally high ratio of benefits to costs, which were estimated at $12 billion.

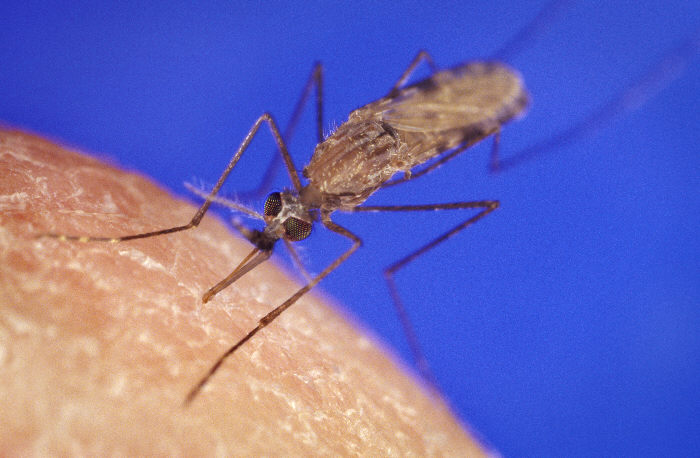
Control malaria

Third on the list was trade liberalization; the experts agreed that modest costs could yield large benefits for the world as a whole and for developing nations.

The fourth priority identified was controlling and treating malaria; $13 billion costs were judged to produce very good benefits, particularly if applied toward chemically-treated mosquito netting for beds.

==== Good ====
The fifth priority identified was increased spending on research into new agricultural technologies appropriate for developing nations. Three proposals for improving sanitation and water quality for a billion of the world’s poorest followed in priority (ranked sixth to eighth: small-scale water technology for livelihoods, community-managed water supply and sanitation, and research on water productivity in food production). Completing this group was the 'government' project concerned with lowering the cost of starting new businesses.

==== Fair ====
Ranked tenth was the project on lowering barriers to migration for skilled workers. Eleventh and twelfth on the list were malnutrition projects – improving infant and child nutrition and reducing the prevalence of low birth weight. Ranked thirteenth was the plan for scaled-up basic health services to fight diseases.

==== Poor ====
Ranked fourteenth to seventeenth were: a migration project (guest-worker programmes for the unskilled), which was deemed to discourage integration; and three projects addressing climate change (optimal carbon tax, the Kyoto Protocol and value-at-risk carbon tax), which the panel judged to be least cost-efficient of the proposals.

=== Global warming ===
The panel found that all three climate policies presented have "costs that were likely to exceed the benefits". It further stated "global warming must be addressed, but agreed that approaches based on too abrupt a shift toward lower emissions of carbon are needlessly expensive."

In regard to the science of global warming, the paper presented by Cline relied primarily on the framework set by Intergovernmental Panel on Climate Change, and accepted the consensus view on global warming that greenhouse gas emissions from human activities are the primary cause of the global warming. Cline relies on various research studies published in the field of economics and attempted to compare the estimated cost of mitigation policies against the expected reduction in the damage of the global warming.

Cline used a discount rate of 1.5%. (Cline's summary is on the project webpage) He justified his choice of discount rate on the ground of "utility-based discounting", that is there is zero bias in terms of preference between the present and the future generation (see time preference). Moreover, Cline extended the time frame of the analysis to three hundred years in the future. Because the expected net damage of the global warming becomes more apparent beyond the present generation(s), this choice had the effect of increasing the present-value cost of the damage of global warming as well as the benefit of abatement policies.

== Criticism ==
Members of the panel including Thomas Schelling and one of the two perspective paper writers Robert O. Mendelsohn (both opponents of the Kyoto protocol) criticised Cline, mainly on the issue of discount rates. (See "The opponent notes to the paper on Climate Change") Mendelsohn, in particular, characterizing Cline's position, said that "[i]f we use a large discount rate, they will be judged to be small effects" and called it "circular reasoning, not a justification". Cline responded to this by arguing that there is no obvious reason to use a large discount rate just because this is what is usually done in economic analysis. In other words, climate change ought to be treated differently from other, more imminent problems. The Economist quoted Mendelsohn as worrying that "climate change was set up to fail".

Moreover, Mendelsohn argued that Cline's damage estimates were excessive. Citing various recent articles, including some of his own, he stated that "[a] series of studies on the impacts of climate change have systematically shown that the older literature overestimated climate damages by failing to allow for adaptation and for climate benefits."

The 2004 Copenhagen Consensus attracted various criticisms:

=== Approach and alleged bias ===
The 2004 report, especially its conclusion regarding climate change, was subsequently criticised from a variety of perspectives. The general approach adopted to set priorities was criticised by Jeffrey Sachs, an American economist and advocate of both the Kyoto protocol and increased development aid, who argued that the analytical framework was inappropriate and biased and that the project "failed to mobilize an expert group that could credibly identify and communicate a true consensus of expert knowledge on the range of issues under consideration.".

Tom Burke, a former director of Friends of the Earth, repudiated the entire approach of the project, arguing that applying cost–benefit analysis in the way the Copenhagen panel did was "junk economics".

John Quiggin, an Australian economics professor, commented that the project is a mix of "a substantial contribution to our understanding of important issues facing the world" and an "exercises in political propaganda" and argued that the selection of the panel members was slanted towards the conclusions previously supported by Lomborg. Quiggin observed that Lomborg had argued in his controversial book The Skeptical Environmentalist that resources allocated to mitigating global warming would be better spent on improving water quality and sanitation, and was therefore seen as having prejudged the issues.

Under the heading "Wrong Question", Sachs further argued that: "The panel that drew up the Copenhagen Consensus was asked to allocate an additional US$50 billion in spending by wealthy countries, distributed over five years, to address the world’s biggest problems. This was a poor basis for decision-making and for informing the public. By choosing such a low sum — a tiny fraction of global income — the project inherently favoured specific low-cost schemes over bolder, larger projects. It is therefore no surprise that the huge and complex challenge of long-term climate change was ranked last, and that scaling up health services in poor countries was ranked lower than interventions against specific diseases, despite warnings in the background papers that such interventions require broader improvements in health services."

In response Lomborg argued that $50 billion was "an optimistic but realistic example of actual spending." "Experience shows that pledges and actual spending are two different things. In 1970 the UN set itself the task of doubling development assistance. Since then the percentage has actually been dropping". "But even if Sachs or others could gather much more than $50 billion over the next 4 years, the Copenhagen Consensus priority list would still show us where it should be invested first."

Thomas Schelling, one of the Copenhagen Consensus panel experts, later distanced himself from the way in which the Consensus results have been interpreted in the wider debate, arguing that it was misleading to put climate change at the bottom of the priority list. The Consensus panel members were presented with a dramatic proposal for handling climate change. If given the opportunity, Schelling would have put a more modest proposal higher on the list. The Yale economist Robert O. Mendelsohn was the official critic of the proposal for climate change during the Consensus. He thought the proposal was way out of the mainstream and could only be rejected. Mendelsohn worries that climate change was set up to fail.

Michael Grubb, an economist and lead author for several IPCC reports, commented on the Copenhagen Consensus, writing:

To try and define climate policy as a trade-off against foreign aid is thus a forced choice that bears no relationship to reality. No government is proposing that the marginal costs associated with, for example, an emissions trading system, should be deducted from its foreign aid budget. This way of posing the question is both morally inappropriate and irrelevant to the determination of real climate mitigation policy.

=== Panel membership ===
Quiggin argued that the members of the 2004 panel, selected by Lomborg, were "generally towards the right and, to the extent that they had stated views, to be opponents of Kyoto." Sachs also noted that the panel members had not previously been much involved in issues of development economics and were unlikely to reach useful conclusions in the time available to them. Commenting on the 2004 Copenhagen Consensus, climatologist and IPCC author Stephen Schneider criticised Lomborg for only inviting economists to participate:

In order to achieve a true consensus, I think Lomborg would've had to invite ecologists, social scientists concerned with justice and how climate change impacts and policies are often inequitably distributed, philosophers who could challenge the economic paradigm of "one dollar, one vote" implicit in cost–benefit analyses promoted by economists, and climate scientists who could easily show that Lomborg's claim that climate change will have only minimal effects is not sound science.

Lomborg countered criticism of the panel membership by stating that "Sachs disparaged the Consensus 'dream team' because it only consisted of economists. But that was the very point of the project. Economists have expertise in economic prioritization. It is they and not climatologists or malaria experts who can prioritize between battling global warming or communicable disease".

== See also ==
- Copenhagen Diagnosis
- UN Economic and Social Council
- UN Human Development Index
- Measuring well-being
- Physical quality-of-life index
- Environmental Economics
