= The Skeptical Environmentalist =

1998 book by Bjørn Lomborg

The Skeptical Environmentalist: Measuring the Real State of the World
- Hardcover edition
- Author: Bjørn Lomborg
- Original title: Verdens sande tilstand
- Translator: Hugh Matthews
- Language: English; Danish
- Subject: Environmental economics and issues Natural resources
- Genre: Non-fiction
- Publisher: Centrum, Cambridge University Press
- Publication date: 22 September 1998 (Danish)
- English publication date: 30 August 2001
- ISBN: 0-521-01068-3
- OCLC: 45618321
- Dewey Decimal: 363.7 21
- LC Class: GE149 .L65 2001
- Followed by: Cool It: The Skeptical Environmentalist's Guide to Global Warming

The Skeptical Environmentalist: Measuring the Real State of the World (Danish: Verdens sande tilstand, lit. 'The True State of the World') is a book by Danish author and statistician Bjørn Lomborg which focuses on the author's view of environmental economics and issues. It was first published in Danish in 1998 by Centrum, and in English by Cambridge University Press in 2001.

Lomborg was inspired by an interview with economist Julian Lincoln Simon to undertake an assessment of publicly available data, and published his findings as a series of articles in Politiken. These formed the basis of the book, in which Lomborg argues against a range of what he considers overly pessimistic claims about environmental issues and their impact on human prosperity. Lomborg argues that environmentalists' concerns over pollution, environmental degradation, decline in natural resources, and climate change are overstated, and outlines his opposition to policy responses like the Kyoto Protocol, deeming them insufficient and causing more harm than good based on cost–benefit analysis. He argues in favour of focus instead being channelled to poverty reduction and combating diseases.

The book generated great controversy and negative reviews upon its release. Lomborg's assertions, methodology and representation of sources were criticised by scientists and groups both in Denmark and internationally. Positive reception in some popular media outlets such as The Economist contrasted sharply with this, and this combined with the ensuing debate aided the book's profile.

The author was formally investigated by the Danish Committees on Scientific Dishonesty (DCSD) for scientific dishonesty, which confirmed the accusation and lack of expertise in relevant fields used in the book. The Danish Ministry of Science, Technology and Innovation criticised procedural aspects drawn by the DCSD, though decided not to reinvestigate. The Skeptical Environmentalist established Lomborg's profile as an opponent of the scientific consensus on climate change. In 2007, Lomborg published a follow-up work titled Cool It: The Skeptical Environmentalist's Guide to Global Warming.

== Background ==
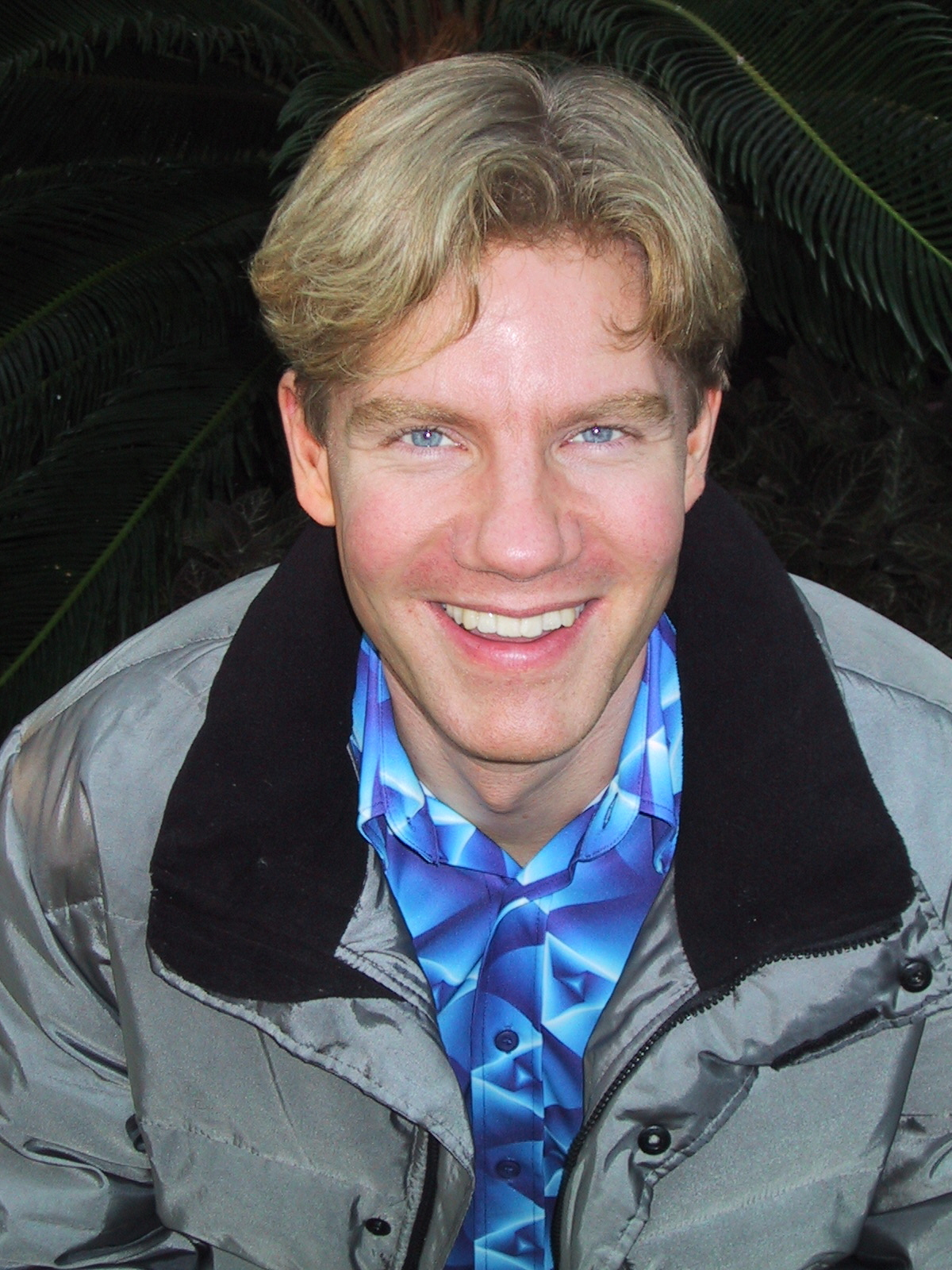
Portrait of the author, Bjørn Lomborg

The book was written by Bjørn Lomborg, a Danish statistician who worked at Aarhus University. The ideas and writing for the book began in the 1990s. He was inspired by an interview with Julian Lincoln Simon which was published in the magazine Wired, in which Simon claimed that calculations he had conducted with publicly available data led him to conclude that standard doomsday conceptions of the state of the world were incorrect. He assumed Simon's views were the product of his American conservative thinking, but in 1997, Lomborg undertook a similar assessment with some of his students and came to similar conclusions as Simon.

In 1998, Lomborg published four articles in the Danish newspaper, Politiken, outlining his research and study. These attracted media coverage and controversy in Denmark. These findings were published as a book in Danish on 22 September 1998 as Verdens Sande Tilstand (The True State of the World) by Centrum. and as The Skeptical Environmentalist in English, by Cambridge University Press in 2001. Sections on global warming, notes and references were expanded in the English edition.

== Contents ==
The Skeptical Environmentalist's subtitle refers to the State of the World report, published annually since 1984 by the Worldwatch Institute. Lomborg designated the report "one of the best-researched and academically most ambitious environmental policy publications," but criticized it for using short-term trends to predict disastrous consequences, in cases where long-term trends would not support the same conclusions.

In establishing its arguments, The Skeptical Environmentalist examined a wide range of issues in the general area of environmental studies, including environmental economics and science, and came to a set of conclusions and recommendations. Lomborg's work directly challenged what it framed as "the Litany of our ever deteriorating environment" by interpreting data from around 3,000 mostly secondary sources. The author suggests that environmentalists have diverted potentially beneficial resources to less deserving environmental issues in ways that were economically damaging. He portrays his book as an unbiased and scientific refutation of the claims of environmental groups. Much of the book's methodology and integrity have been subject to criticism, which argue that Lomborg distorted the fields of research he covers.

The Skeptical Environmentalist is arranged around four major themes:

1. Human prosperity from an economic and demographic point of view. He argues prosperity, life expectancy, food and hunger and health have improved over the past centuries in most parts of the world, despite ongoing challenges such as HIV/AIDS. He dismisses Thomas Malthus' theory that increases in the world's population lead to widespread hunger.
2. Human prosperity from an ecological point of view. Lomborg examines the state of natural resources and draws a conclusion that contrasts to that of the well known report The Limits to Growth. He argues that food is increasing, with the exception of fish which is depleting. He argues that there is no indication of widespread deforestation, and economic growth is a solution to the issue in developing countries. Lomborg asserts that rare materials and oil are not being depleted as fast as is claimed, and that improvements of technology will provide people with fossil fuels for years to come. Lomborg says that water conflicts will not take place because they are not cost-effective, and argues in favour of better water management.
3. Pollution as a threat to human prosperity. He connects air pollution and water pollution with economic growth, and argues that faster economic growth will reduce their impacts. He also says that fears over waste are overblown given the percentage of land they can take up.
4. Future threats to human prosperity. Lomborg puts forward his main assertion that based on cost-benefit analysis, environmental threats to human prosperity are overstated and policy responses are misguided. He states his view that links between pesticide use and cancer are exaggerated and that biodiversity loss and species extinction have little impact on human prosperity. On global warming, Lomborg accepts its occurrence but expresses doubts over computer modelling and argues that policy responses such as the Kyoto Protocol have greater costs than benefits.

Lomborg's main argument is that the vast majority of environmental problems—such as pollution, water shortages, deforestation, and species loss, as well as population growth, hunger, and AIDS—are area-specific and highly correlated with poverty. He concludes that challenges to human prosperity are essentially logistical matters, and can be solved largely through economic and social development.

== Reception ==
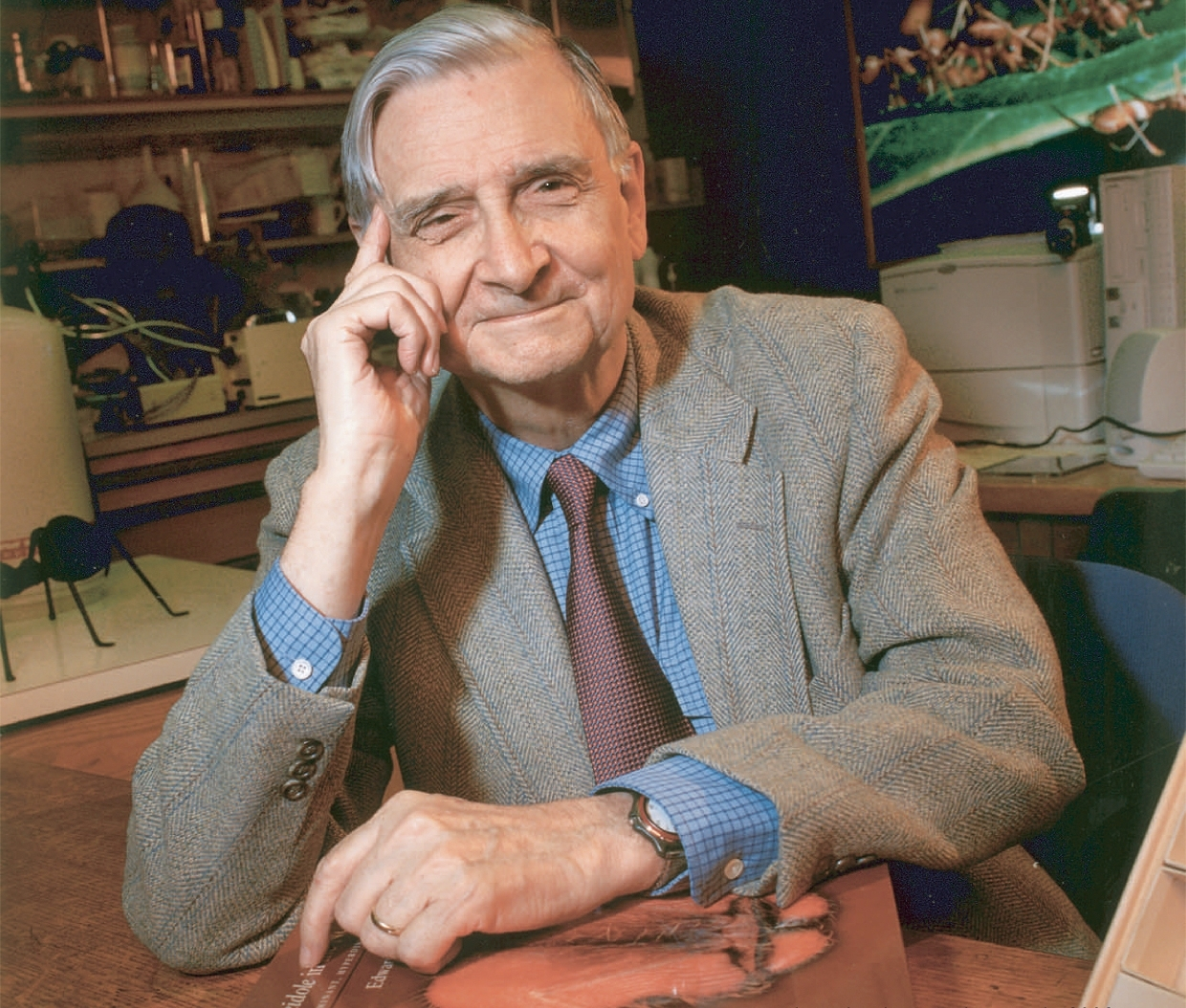
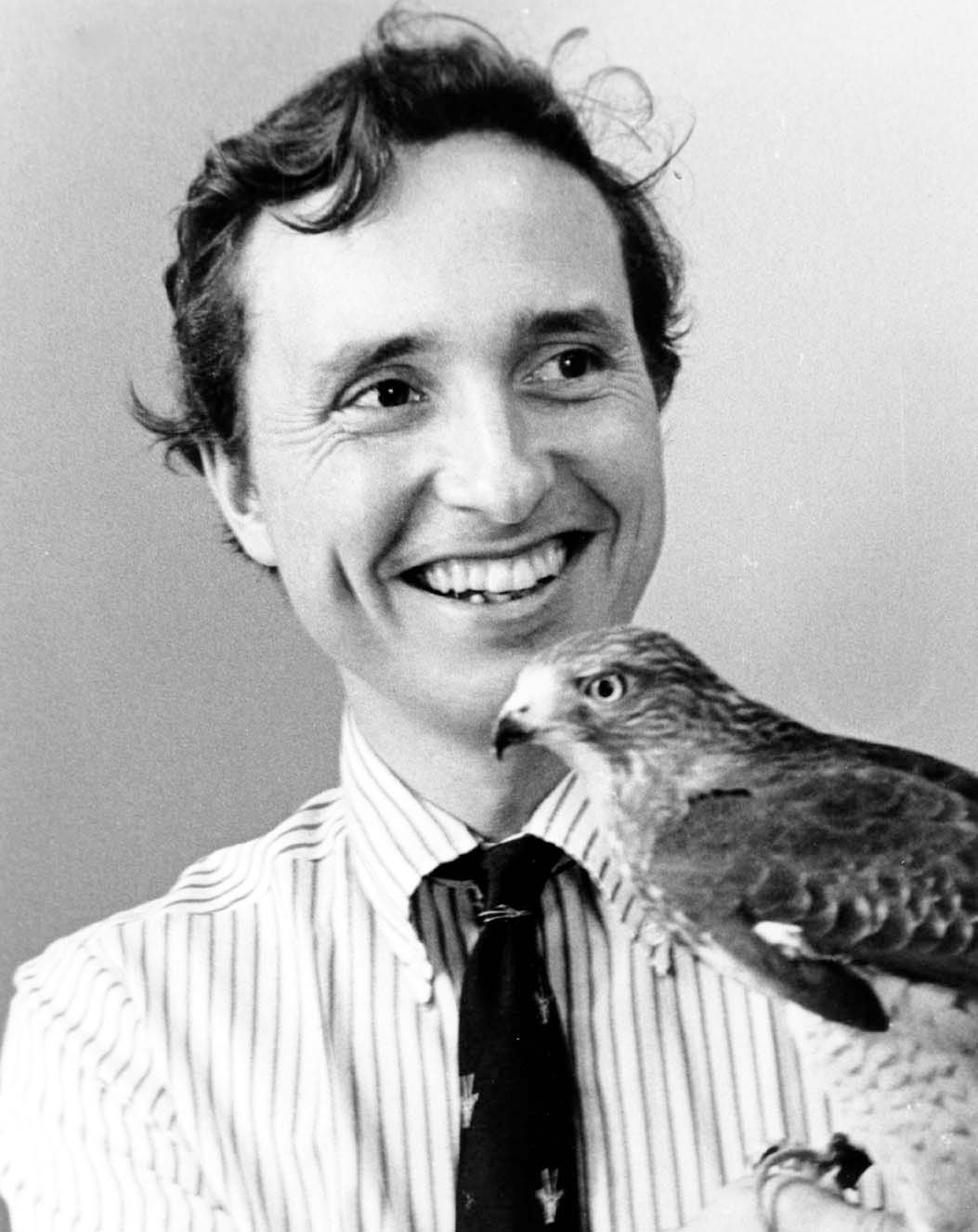
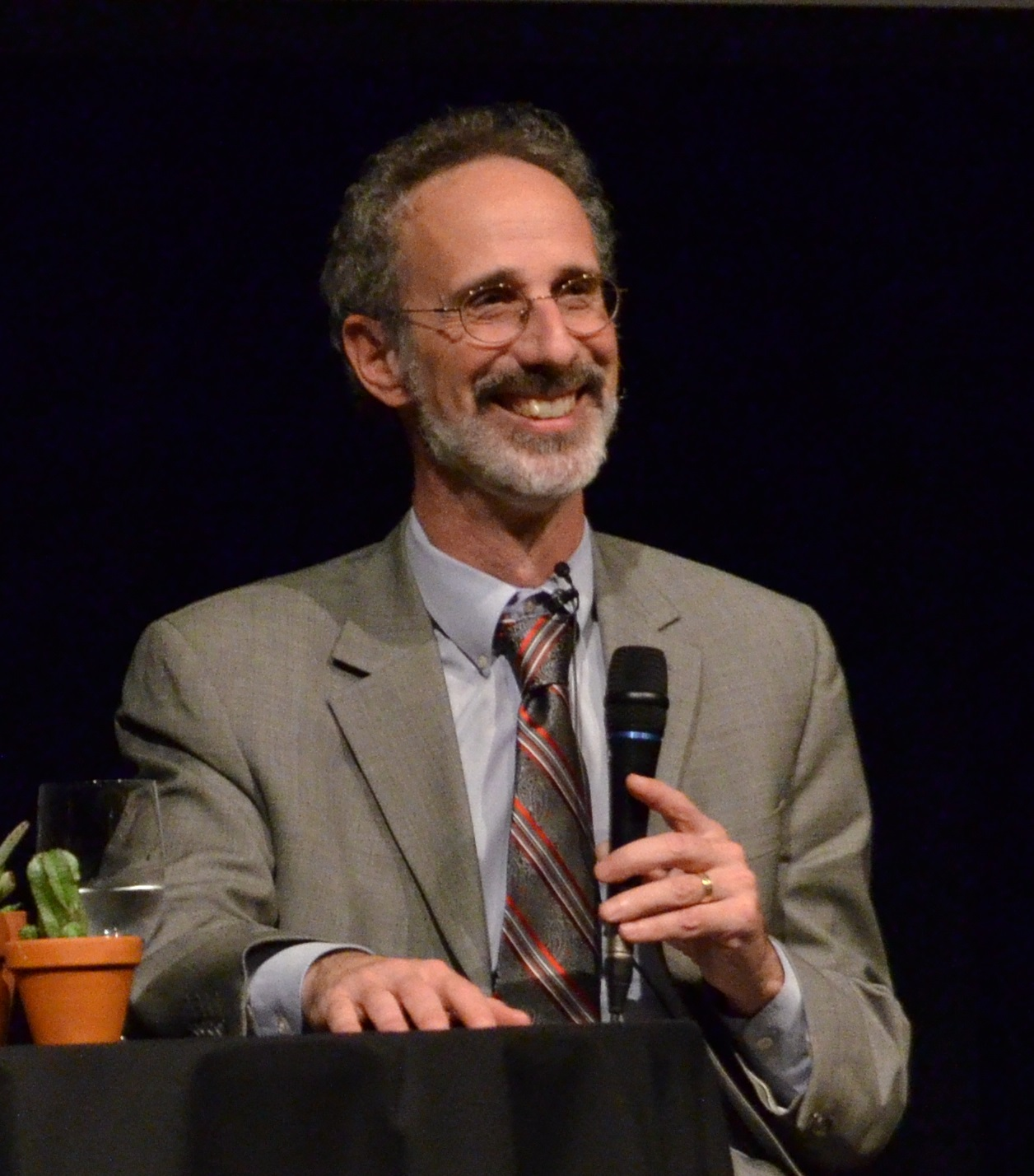
Edward O. Wilson, Thomas Lovejoy and Peter Gleick were among the scientists that criticized the book upon release.

The book generally received negative reviews from the scientific community, focusing on the author's methodology, data issues, theories and concepts. The most common critiques were the selective use of data, followed by referencing, and lack of focus on the environmental movement. Most environmental scientists argued that the book was deeply flawed, and that the state of the environment was not clearly represented. In some cases, reviews were harsh in both content and tone.

The Danish Ecological Council, an advisory committee on environmental issues, published a "counter-publication" which criticised Lomborg's methods and approach in his book. The publication was released in 1999 as Fremtidens Pris (The Price of the Future), written by 18 contributors of various disciplines.

I would fail one of my undergraduate students if they were to write such trash.

— Jeffrey Harvey on The Skeptical Environmentalist

The Union of Concerned Scientists published a critique of the book, highlighting reviews by Peter Gleick, Jerry D. Mahlman, Thomas Lovejoy, Norman Myers, Jeffrey Harvey, E. O. Wilson and Stuart Pimm. They concluded that the book fits squarely in a tradition of contrarian environmental works, which may gain temporary prominence but ultimately fail to stand up to scientific scrutiny. Harvey compared the book unfavourably to University undergraduate quality, and added "ecology is the most complex of sciences and Lomborg has never done a shred of work in the field". In a letter, Wilson said that the greatest regret he had about the book was "the time wasted by scientists correcting the misinformation created."

In January 2002, a heading from Scientific American read, "Misleading Math about the Earth" and contained set of essays written by scientists on the book. The article concluded that The Skeptical Environmentalist misrepresented both scientific evidence and opinion. The journal also refused Lomborg's request of publishing a defense print of 32 pages, rather a page in the later May issue in 2002. The magazine later published his complete rebuttal on its website, along with the counter rebuttals of John Rennie and John P. Holdren.

Nature also published a harsh review of Lomborg's book, in which Stuart Pimm of the Center for Environmental Research and Conservation at Columbia University and Jeff Harvey of the Netherlands Institute of Ecology wrote: "Like bad term papers, Lomborg's text relies heavily on secondary sources. Out of around 2,000 references, about 5% come from news sources and 30% from web downloads — readily accessible, therefore, but frequently not peer reviewed." They continued that "the text employs the strategy of those who, for example, argue that gay men aren't dying of AIDS, that Jews weren't singled out by the Nazis for extermination, and so on."

Peter Gleick was also highly critical, stating "there is nothing original or unique in Lomborg's book. Many of his criticisms have appeared in... previous works—and even in the work of environmental scientists themselves. What is new, perhaps, is the scope and variety of the errors he makes." David Pimentel wrote a critical review in Population and Environment, particularly taking issue with Lomborg's argument on soil erosion, pesticides, deforestation and water resources. He concluded that "as an agricultural scientist and ecologist, I wish I could share Lomborg's optimistic views, but my investigations and that of countless scientists leads me to a more conservative outlook." Roger A. Pielke, meanwhile, defended Lomborg and the book, describing the debate as an example of politicising science.

The 12 December 2001 issue of Grist devoted an issue to The Skeptical Environmentalist, with a series of essays from various scientists challenging individual sections. A separate article examining the book's overall approach by Kathryn Schulz took issue with the framing of Lomborg's conclusions, asking "[why] does he weigh the environment only against hospitals and childcare, rather than against, say, industry subsidies and defense spending?".

Legal scholar David Shoenbrod was one of the defenders of Lomborg. In March 2003, the New York Law School Law Review published an examination of the critical reviews of Skeptical Environmentalist from the Scientific American, Nature and Science magazines by Shoenbrod and then-Senior Law Student Christi Wilson of New York Law School. The authors defend Lomborg, say that the book is "largely free from factual errors", and characterise the scientific community's response to the book as a "disingenuous attack", using legal arguments that a court should accept Lomborg as a credible expert witness in the field of statistics, given that his testimony would be appropriately restricted to his area of expertise.

== Media coverage ==
The book was widely cited in conservative media and groups who oppose environmental regulations. Influential UK newsweekly The Economist supported Lomborg's views, publishing an advance essay by Lomborg in which he detailed his "litany", and following up with a highly favorable review and supportive coverage. It stated that "This is one of the most valuable books on public policy—not merely environmental policy—to have been written for the intelligent general reader in the past ten years...The Skeptical Environmentalist is a triumph."

In a profile of Lomborg preceding the book's publication The New York Times stated that "The primary target of the book, a substantial work of analysis with almost 3,000 footnotes, are statements made by environmental organizations like the Worldwatch Institute, the World Wildlife Fund and Greenpeace." In August 2001, The Guardian published three exclusive essays by Lomborg and hosted an online debate with him, describing him as "Europe's most controversial environmental thinker". The Wall Street Journal deemed Lomborg's work "a superbly documented and readable book." In The Washington Post, Denis Dutton claimed that "Bjørn Lomborg's good news about the environment is bad news for Green ideologues. His richly informative, lucid book is now the place from which environmental policy decisions must be argued. In fact, The Skeptical Environmentalist is the most significant work on the environment since the appearance of its polar opposite, Rachel Carson's Silent Spring, in 1962. It's a magnificent achievement." Rolling Stone wrote that "Lomborg pulls off the remarkable feat of welding the techno-optimism of the Internet age with a lefty's concern for the fate of the planet."

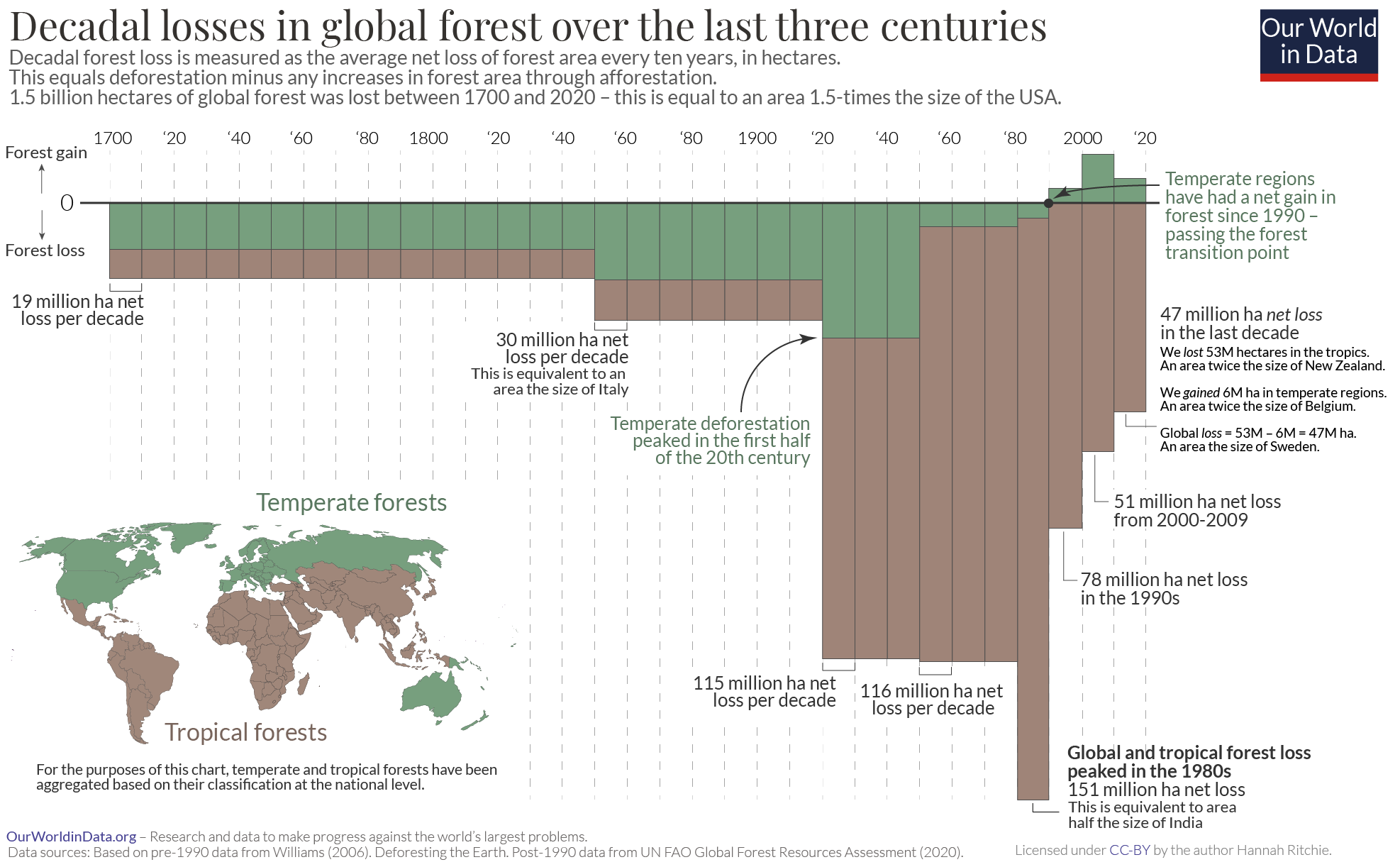
In his review, Chris Lavers took issue with Lomborg's characterisation of deforestation, saying "The area of land covered with trees may not have changed much in the last 50 years, but this is mostly because northern forests have increased in area while the biologically richer tropical ones have declined."

Chris Lavers gave a mixed review in The Guardian, saying Lomborg "is clearly committed to rubbishing the views of hand-picked environmentalists, frequently the very silly ones such as Ehrlich, whom professionals have been ignoring for decades" and criticising his framing of deforestation.

In a BBC column from 23 August 2001, veteran BBC environmental correspondent Alex Kirby wrote:

I am neither a statistician nor a scientist, and I lack the skill to judge Lomborg's reworkings of the statistics of conventional wisdom. But I am worried that on virtually every topic he touches, he reaches conclusions radically different from almost everybody else. That seems to suggest that most scientists are wrong, short-sighted, naïve, interested only in securing research funds, or deliberately dancing to the campaigners' tune. Most I know are honest, intelligent and competent. So it beggars belief to suppose that Professor Lomborg is the only one in step, every single time.

Kirby's first concern was not with the extensive research and statistical analysis, but the conclusions drawn from them, concluding: "In the rational world that Bjørn Lomborg thinks we all inhabit, we would manage problems sensibly, one by one. But the real world is messier, more unpredictable—and more impatient."

=== Reception of media coverage ===
Shortly after its release, the World Resources Institute and World Wide Fund for Nature published a nine-point critique of Lomborg's work and credentials specifically targeted at journalists, advising them to "proceed with caution" in their coverage of the book. One critical article, "The Skeptical Environmentalist: A Case Study in the Manufacture of News", attributes the book's media success to its initial, influential supporters, who linked its message to a European visit from United States president George W. Bush.

News of the pending book first appeared in the UK in early June of 2001 when a Sunday Times article by Nayab Chohan featured an advanced report of claims made by Lomborg that London's air was cleaner than at any time since 1585. Headlined "Cleanest London Air for 400 Years", the publicity hook was both local and timely, as the tail end of the article linked the book's questioning of the Kyoto climate change protocol to U.S. president George W. Bush's visit the same week to Europe, and Bush's controversial opposition to the treaty. The Times followed up the report the next day with a news article further detailing the book's Kyoto protocol angle. With The Times reports, Lomborg and his claims had made the Anglo media agenda. As is typically the case, other media outlets followed the reporting of the elite newspaper. Articles pegging the claims of The Skeptical Environmentalist to Bush's European visit ran later that week in the U.K's The Express and Daily Telegraph, and Canada's Toronto Star.

— Marc Kreider, Skeptical Inquirer

Richard C. Bell, writing for Worldwatch argued that many reviews in prominent publications were written by individuals with prior association with Lomborg, "instead of seeking scientists with a critical perspective." In The Wall Street Journal, a review was published by the Competitive Enterprise Institute's Ronald Bailey, someone "who had earlier written a book called The True State of the World, from which much of Lomborg's claims were taken." Bell also criticized the Washington Post, whose Sunday Book World assigned the book review to Denis Dutton, identified as "a professor of philosophy who lectures on the dangers of pseudoscience at the science faculties of the University of Canterbury in New Zealand", and the editor of the web site Arts and Letters Daily. Bell noted that "The Post did not tell its readers that Dutton's web site features links to the Global Climate Coalition, an anti-Kyoto consortium of oil and coal businesses, and to the messages of Julian Simon—the man whose denial that global warming was occurring apparently gave Lomborg the idea for his book in the first place."

== Pieing incident ==
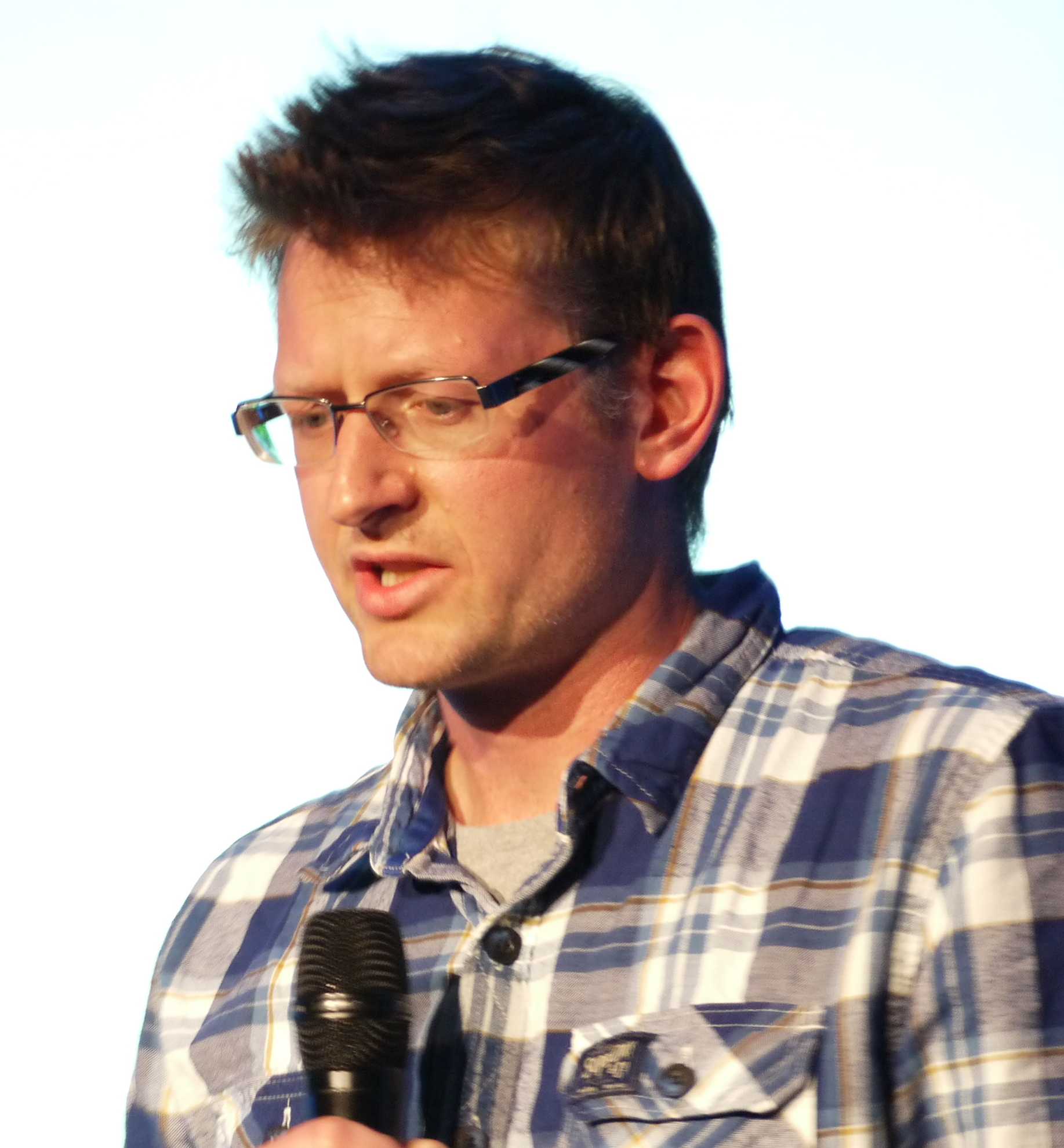
Mark Lynas, who pied Lomborg over disagreement with his views set out in The Skeptical Environmentalist.

On 5 September 2001, at a promotional event at a Borders book shop in Oxford, England, British environmentalist author Mark Lynas threw a cream pie in Lomborg's face. While doing so, he said "I wanted to put a Baked Alaska in his smug face in solidarity with the native Indian and Eskimo people in Alaska". In a post on Indymedia titled "Why I pied Lomborg", Lynas stated "Lomborg specialises in presenting the reader with false choices—such as the assertion that money not spent on preventing climate change could be spent on bringing clean water to the developing world, thereby saving more lives per dollar of expenditure. Of course, in the real world, these are not the kind of choices we are faced with." Lynas also commented on the difficulty of challenging Lomborg's book, arguing "his work, as flawed as it is, has clearly been very time-consuming and meticulous. In a busy and under funded world, few people have the time or background knowledge to plow though 3,000 footnotes checking his sources. It is impressively interdisciplinary."

Lomborg said he was "stunned" by the incident, but "at least the pie tasted good". Lynas later apologised to Lomborg and said that he regretted pieing him. The two would later be on "friendly" terms.

== Accusations of scientific dishonesty ==
After the publication of The Skeptical Environmentalist, Lomborg was accused of scientific dishonesty. Several environmental scientists brought a total of three complaints against Lomborg to the Danish Committees on Scientific Dishonesty (DCSD), a body under Denmark's Ministry of Science, Technology and Innovation. Lomborg was asked whether he regarded the book as a "debate" publication, and thereby not under the purview of the DCSD, or as a scientific work; he chose the latter, clearing the way for the inquiry that followed. The charges stated that The Skeptical Environmentalist contained deliberately misleading data and flawed conclusions. Due to the similarity of the complaints, the DCSD decided to proceed on the three cases under one investigation.

=== Danish Committees on Scientific Dishonesty investigation ===
A six-month review took place and on 6 January 2003, a 17-page DCSD ruling was released, in which the Committees decided that The Skeptical Environmentalist showed "systematic one-sidedness" and was scientifically dishonest, but Lomborg was innocent of wrongdoing due to a lack of expertise in the relevant fields. The investigation heavily relied on published reviews of the book.

Objectively speaking, the publication of the work under consideration is deemed to fall within the concept of scientific dishonesty. ... In view of the subjective requirements made in terms of intent or gross negligence, however, Lomborg's publication cannot fall within the bounds of this characterization. Conversely, the publication is deemed clearly contrary to the standards of good scientific practice.

— Danish Committees on Scientific Dishonesty

The DCSD cited The Skeptical Environmentalist for fabrication of data, selective discarding of unwanted results (selective citation), deliberately misleading use of statistical methods, distorted interpretation of conclusions, plagiarism and deliberate misinterpretation of others' results.

Lomborg defended his work, challenging the committee for not identifying specific errors. He also argued the report could jeopardise his employment at the Danish Institute for Environmental Assessment and some of his critics attempted to do this, although government officials denied his posting would be impacted.

The DCSD decision about Lomborg led to a petition from some Danish social scientists, calling for the body to be abolished and arguing the body cannot hold the book to the same standards as medical and natural sciences. Another group of around 600 Danish scientists, many of them from medical and natural science fields, collected signatures in support of the DCSD. The ruling was also debated in parliament, and science minister Helge Sander asked the Danish Research Agency to establish a working group to scrutinise the DCSD's procedures.

=== Ministry of Science, Technology and Innovation review and response ===
On 13 February 2003, Lomborg filed a complaint against the DCSD's decision with the Ministry of Science, Technology and Innovation (MSTI), which oversees the group. On 17 December, the Ministry released a report identifying a number of procedural errors had made, although did not refute any criticisms of the book. It criticised the DCSD for not identifying specific areas of error and for not providing an opportunity for Lomborg to respond before the report's publication.

The Ministry then remitted the case to the DCSD, and instructed the DCSD to decide whether to reinvestigate. On 12 March 2004, the Committee formally decided not to act further on the complaints, reasoning that renewed scrutiny would, in all likelihood, result in the same conclusion.

== Legacy ==
Jim Giles wrote a 2003 retrospective on the book in Nature, saying it was "packed with facts and figures, yet it was the emotional response that it inspired that will be best remembered," and argued that it would have little long-lasting influence. Giles suggested the intense critical reaction from scientists and environmental groups was driven by fears that the book's talking points would be adopted by the Bush administration, but their criticisms conversely boosted sales and Lomborg's profile. Cambridge University Press said sales of the book quadrupled in the month following negative reviews in Scientific American. Jeffrey Harvey, who had debated Lomborg several times by 2003, admitted that the tone of attacks on Lomborg could have been counterproductive. In 2005, an article by a group of non-climatologist scientists published in the Journal of Information Ethics, claimed that most criticism against the book was unjustified, and that the scientific community had misused their authority to suppress the author. The claim that the accusations against Lomborg were unjustified was challenged in the next issue of the journal by Kåre Fog who asserts that, "despite the ministry's decision, most of the accusations against Lomborg were valid." He also rejected the Galileo hypothesis, "that Lomborg is a brave young man confronting old-fashioned opposition."

Another article published in the Journal of Integrative Environmental Sciences in 2010, recounted the controversy surrounding the book and criticised the author and publisher, saying "the question remains why a book that contains so many flaws by someone without any scientific credentials has received so much public attention." The article also pointed to contradiction of the principles of environmental economics in the book. They concluded that "the book is anyway sure to go down in history as an unreliable source of information and argumentation, being one of the most severely criticized texts issued ever by a prestigious academic publisher".

Despite the controversy, The Skeptical Environmentalist established Lomborg as a public figure and prominent critic of the scientific consensus on climate change. He was named one of the Time 100 most influential people in 2004, and established the Copenhagen Consensus to institutionalize his views. He was also appointed director of the Environmental Assessment Institute in Denmark. By 2004, some polluting industries bodies had already quoted Lomborg or invited him to speak to further their agendas. The Skeptical Environmentalist was followed by Cool It: The Skeptical Environmentalist's Guide to Global Warming, which was published in 2007.

== See also ==
- Global warming controversy
- Media coverage of climate change
- Environmental skepticism
- Anti-environmentalism
- State of Fear
- The Population Bomb
- Climate change denial
- Howard Friel, critic of Lomborg
