= Chris Lavers =

Natural historian (born 1965)

Chris Lavers (born 1965) is an author, natural historian, and Associate Professor of Ecology and Biogeography at the University of Nottingham.

His most popular book to date is The Natural History of Unicorns. In a review of this book, The Washington Post has written "Don't confuse this book with cryptozoology [...] Lavers is a scientist and a scholar. He isn't trying to prove the existence of an elusive beast. He understands that myths, like hardy plants, grow from their native environment, then get carried abroad and cross-fertilize with indigenous stories elsewhere, producing hybrids whose lineage requires careful untangling."

== Books ==
- The Natural History of Unicorns. USA: William Morris. (2009) ISBN 978-0-06-087414-8.
- Why Elephants Have Big Ears; Understanding Patterns of Life. St. Martin's Griffin.
