= Environmental Assessment Institute =

Danish governmental body

The Environmental Assessment Institute (EAI) (Danish: Institut for Miljøvurdering – IMV) was an independent body under the Danish Ministry of the Environment. It was established in February 2002 by the Liberal/Conservative Danish Government with the task of making environmental and economic cost/benefit analyses. The EAI's first Director was political scientist Bjørn Lomborg.

The EAI was seen by some as a vehicle created for Lomborg, whose book The Skeptical Environmentalist argues that many perceived environmental problems are vastly exaggerated by environmental lobby and that policy responses based on such exaggerated claims are often misguided. The Government appointed Ole P. Kristensen, an ex-professor at the institute where Lomborg worked, as the first Director of the Board. His job was to find the director and the other board members. Lomborg was soon announced as the director.

The EAI began operating on 1 June 2002.

The EAI published a series of reports on environmental issues, from the value of a deposit/return system for drink cans to global warming. Most of them are in Danish. A report from October 2002 made an economic cost-benefit analysis of deposits on disposable bottles and cans. It concluded that it would be better to abandon the deposit system and to let the bottles and cans be burned together with other household garbage. However, it turned out afterwards that many of the Danish incineration plants operate at temperatures at which aluminum cans will not burn, but only melt, and that the cans would pose a great economic problem for them.

A committee was formed in March 2003 to evaluate the reports issued by the EAI during the second half of 2002. This committee was composed of one Danish member and four experts from Sweden and Norway. The committee adjudged the first three reports published in 2002 as superficial attempts to focus attention on the EAI. The other reports were adjudged appealing to the public, but the committee was not confident in the conclusions of two reports and in general criticized the cost-benefit analyses.

In November 2003, five out of the seven board members resigned on the same day. Three of them did so because of disagreement about the Institute's involvement in the Copenhagen Consensus project, the others did so because of lack of time and conflicts of interest.

In mid-June 2004, there was some stir in the Danish printed media because it was revealed that criticism of Lomborg’s book from Danish climate experts had been repressed for years by the head of the EAI (Lomborg). Lomborg resigned as director on 1 August 2004.

From 1 July 2007 the Environmental Assessment Institute was changed into a department of the Danish Economic Council, and thus no longer exists as a separate institute.
