= Danish Committees on Scientific Dishonesty =

Danish government organisations

The Danish Committees on Scientific Dishonesty (Danish: Udvalgene vedrørende Videnskabelig Uredelighed, or UVVU) are a set of three committees under the Danish Ministry of Research and Information Technology: a committee for natural science, agricultural and veterinary science and technical science; a committee for health and medical science; and a committee for social science and the humanities. They have a common chairman.

Previously obscure, the DCSD became embroiled in controversy after its January 2003 decision that the 2001 book The Skeptical Environmentalist by Bjørn Lomborg was "clearly contrary to the standards of good scientific practice", due to the author's systematically biased choice of data, and objectively was scientifically irredeemable, but Lomborg himself could not be subjectively convicted of intentional or gross negligence. Lomborg had argued in his book that claims by environmentalists about global warming, overpopulation, deforestation, and other matters are not scientifically substantiated. The DCSD further held that because of Lomborg's lack of scientific expertise, he had not shown intentional or gross negligence, and acquitted him of the accusations of scientific dishonesty.

In February 2003, Lomborg filed a complaint with the Ministry, and in December 2003, the Ministry found that the DCSD's handling of the investigation in the case had been improper, and remitted it for re-examination. In March 2004, the DCSD stated that since its finding had been to acquit Lomborg of the charges of scientific dishonesty (although they had criticized his biased selection of data), there was no basis to re-open the investigation, and dismissed the case.

The original DCSD decision about Lomborg provoked a petition among Danish academics. 308 scientists, many of them from the social sciences, criticised the DCSD's methods in the case and called for the DCSD to be disbanded. The Danish Minister of Science, Technology, and Innovation then asked the Danish Research Agency to form an independent working group to review DCSD practices. In response to this, another group of Danish scientists collected over 600 signatures (primarily from the medical and natural sciences community) to support the continued existence of the DCSD and presented their petition to the Danish Research Agency.

The DCSD was involved in another controversy investigating a paper on sex and intelligence authored by Helmuth Nyborg. After the DCSD cleared Nyborg of the charges of scientific misconduct, two Aarhus University professors, Lise Togeby and Jens Mammen resigned from their positions in the DCSD, citing that the DCSD operated from too narrow of a framework. Togeby explained that "Roughly speaking, these committees can only decide whether a researcher has cheated or not. We cannot consider the issue of academic quality, or decide whether research has been carried out in accordance with good academic standards".
