= Cool It: The Skeptical Environmentalist's Guide to Global Warming =

2007 book by Bjørn Lomborg

- First edition cover
- Author: Bjørn Lomborg
- Cover artist: Chip Kidd
- Language: English
- Genre: Non-fiction
- Publisher: Knopf Publishing Group
- Publication date: 2007-09-04
- Publication place: United States
- Media type: Print (Hardcover)
- Pages: 272
- ISBN: 978-0-307-26692-7
- OCLC: 423500317
- Dewey Decimal: 363.738/74 22
- LC Class: QC981.8.G56 L657 2007
- Preceded by: The Skeptical Environmentalist

Cool It: The Skeptical Environmentalist's Guide to Global Warming is a book by Danish statistician Bjørn Lomborg. It is a sequel to The Skeptical Environmentalist (first published in Danish in 1998), which in English translation brought the author to international attention. In Cool It, Lomborg argues his view that many negative impacts of climate change are overstated, and mitigation approaches are expensive and have poor return on investment; he instead proposes alternative solutions. The book was adapted into a 2010 documentary film of the same name.

Released amid a period of public debate over global warming, reception for the book was mixed. Howard Friel wrote a book-length response called The Lomborg Deception which challenges its veracity.

== Content ==
In Cool It, Lomborg argues his view that many of the elaborate and expensive actions being considered to stop global warming will cost hundreds of billions of dollars without the same return on investment, often are based on emotional rather than strictly scientific assumptions, and may have very little impact on the world's temperature for centuries. He attempts to dispel what he views as climate change "myths", arguing that it is too soon to say if Greenland's ice is melting, and that the impacts of sea level rise, extreme weather, droughts and floods are overhyped. He argues that rising temperatures could save more than 1.3 million lives per year, as more cold-related deaths than would be prevented than heat-related respiratory fatalities. Lomborg concludes that reducing carbon emissions is not an effective solution, and that the Kyoto Protocol would only delay the impacts of climate change. He instead proposes a limited carbon tax is needed in the First World as well as subsidies from the First World to the Third World to help fight ongoing humanitarian crises.

== Reception and critique ==
In a review in The New York Times, Andrew Revkin says that Lomborg uses the book to reprise "his earlier argument with a tighter focus. He tries to puncture more of what he says are environmental myths, like the imminent demise of polar bears." According to The Guardian, academics rejected Lomborg's view that warming temperatures would save lives. A profile in The Guardian also suggested that Lomborg's statements on the effects of climate change contradicted each other within a few pages.

Economist Frank Ackerman of Tufts University and the Stockholm Environment Institute, wrote a review of Lomborg's book. In it, Ackerman criticised Lomborg for his views on the economics of climate change, including the costs of the Kyoto Protocol and the use of cost-benefit analysis.

IPCC lead author Brian C. O'Neill's review of Cool It was supportive of the book's themes of rejecting climate alarmism while supporting cause prioritization which weighs investments in climate change mitigation against other global issues. Yet he was sharply critical of the book's treatment of facts, describing it as full of cherry picking and "outright distortions of the source material". O'Neill concludes:

[...] Bjorn Lomborg is like the Oliver Stone of climate change. He has written a book that sets out to support a certain point of view, and, unless you are an expert, you will never know which facts are correct and appropriately used and which are not. You might not be aware that large (and crucial) chunks of the story are skipped altogether. But like a Stone movie, it is a well-told tale and raises some questions that are worth thinking about. So if you are going to read only one book on climate, don’t read this one. But if you are going to read ten, reading Lomborg may be worthwhile.

=== The Lomborg Deception ===
In 2010, Howard Friel wrote The Lomborg Deception, a book-length critique of Cool It, which fact-checks all of Lomborg's claims against the book's references and tests their authority and substance. Friel has said he found "misrepresentation of academic research, misquotation of data, reliance on studies irrelevant to the author’s claims and citation of sources that seem not to exist" and characterised Lomborg as "a performance artist disguised as an academic".

Friel's conclusion, as per his book's title, is that Lomborg is "a performance artist disguised as an academic." I don't want to be as trusting as the reviewers who praised Lomborg's scholarship without (it seems) bothering to check his references, so rather than taking Friel at his word just as they took Lomborg at his, I've done my best to do that checking. Although Friel engages in some bothersome overkill, overall his analysis is compelling.

— Sharon Begley, Newsweek

== Documentary film ==
A feature-length documentary film adaptation of Cool It was released in 2010, which features Lomborg.

== Editions ==
- Cool It: The Skeptical Environmentalist's Guide to Global Warming, Knopf Publishing Group (2007-09-04), ISBN 978-0-307-26692-7 (Hardcover, 253 pages)

== See also ==
- Global warming controversy
