= Global Crises, Global Solutions =

2004 book edited by Bjørn Lomborg

- Author: Bjørn Lomborg
- Language: English
- Publisher: Cambridge University Press
- Publication date: October 25, 2004
- Media type: Print (hardcover, paperback), e-book (2009)
- Pages: 670
- ISBN: 0-521-60614-4
- OCLC: 321387887

Global Crises, Global Solutions (ISBN 0-521-60614-4) is a book presenting the methodology, economic papers and conclusions of the first Copenhagen Consensus, edited by Bjørn Lomborg, published in 2004 by the Cambridge University Press.
