= Jeffrey Harvey (biologist) =

Canadian ecologist (born 1957)

Jeff Harvey (born 1957 in Toronto, Ontario, Canada) is a Senior Scientist in the Department of Multitrophic Interactions at the Netherlands Institute of Ecology, and formerly an associate editor of Nature.

Harvey specializes in research concerning:

- "Intra-interspecific variation in plant quality and its effects on herbivores, parasitoids and hyperparasitoids; linking above- and below ground multitrophic interactions via plant defense."
- "Life-history, foraging and developmental strategies in hyperparasitoids."
- "Spatial and temporal effects on multitrophic interactions."
- "Science, ecology and advocacy."

== See also ==
- The Skeptical Environmentalist; Harvey was prominent among the many critics of this book.
