= Renewable energy commercialization =

Deployment of technologies harnessing easily replenished natural resources

Investment: Companies, governments and households have been committing increasing amounts to decarbonization, including renewable energy (solar, wind), electric vehicles and associated charging infrastructure, energy storage, energy-efficient heating systems, carbon capture and storage, and hydrogen. By 2025, investment in the energy transition had grown to about twice that for fossil fuels (oil, natural gas and coal).

Cost: With increasingly widespread implementation of renewable energy sources, costs have declined, most notably for energy generated by solar panels. Levelized cost of energy (LCOE) is a measure of the average net present cost of electricity generation for a generating plant over its lifetime.

Renewable energy commercialization involves the deployment of three generations of renewable energy technologies dating back more than 100 years. First-generation technologies, which are already mature and economically competitive, include biomass, hydroelectricity, geothermal power and heat. Second-generation technologies are market-ready and are being deployed at the present time; they include solar heating, photovoltaics, wind power, solar thermal power stations, and modern forms of bioenergy. Third-generation technologies require continued R&D efforts in order to make large contributions on a global scale and include advanced biomass gasification, hot-dry-rock geothermal power, and ocean energy. In 2019, nearly 75% of new installed electricity generation capacity used renewable energy and the International Energy Agency (IEA) has predicted that by 2025, renewable capacity will meet 35% of global power generation.

Public policy and political leadership helps to "level the playing field" and drive the wider acceptance of renewable energy technologies. Countries such as Germany, Denmark, and Spain have led the way in implementing innovative policies which has driven most of the growth over the past decade. As of 2014, Germany has a commitment to the "Energiewende" transition to a sustainable energy economy, and Denmark has a commitment to 100% renewable energy by 2050. There are now 144 countries with renewable energy policy targets.

In 2015, new installed wind accounted for 64GW and new photovoltaic capacity comprised 57GW with a total of US$329 Billion for global renewables investment. The top countries for investment in 2012 were China, Germany, Spain, the United States, Italy, and Brazil.

Climate change concerns are also driving increasing growth in the renewable energy industries. According to a 2011 projection by the IEA, solar power generators may produce most of the world's electricity within 50 years, reducing harmful greenhouse gas emissions.

== Background ==
=== Rationale for renewables ===
Production of technology such as renewable energy sources starts a positive feedback loop to form what has been called a virtuous cycle—the opposite of a vicious cycle. For example, as more and more solar modules are deployed, prices fall because of the economies of scale, allowing the technology to become cost-competitive in new applications that in turn increase demand for more deployment.

Climate change, pollution, and energy insecurity are significant problems, and addressing them requires major changes to energy infrastructures. Renewable energy technologies are essential contributors to the energy supply portfolio, as they contribute to world energy security, reduce dependency on fossil fuels, and some also provide opportunities for mitigating greenhouse gases. Climate-disrupting fossil fuels are being replaced by clean, climate-stabilizing, non-depletable sources of energy:

...the transition from coal, oil, and gas to wind, solar, and geothermal energy is well under way. In the old economy, energy was produced by burning something — oil, coal, or natural gas — leading to the carbon emissions that have come to define our economy. The new energy economy harnesses the energy in wind, the energy coming from the sun, and heat from within the earth itself.

In 2012, a Council on Foreign Relations public opinion survey found that there was strong support for a variety of methods for addressing the problem of energy supply. These methods include promoting renewable sources such as solar power and wind power, requiring utilities to use more renewable energy, and providing tax incentives to encourage the development and use of such technologies.

In 2010, Eurobarometer polled the twenty-seven EU member states about the target "to increase the share of renewable energy in the EU by 20 percent by 2020". Most people in all twenty-seven countries either approved of the target or called for it to go further. Across the EU, 57 percent thought the proposed goal was "about right" and 16 percent thought it was "too modest." In comparison, 19 percent said it was "too ambitious".

As of 2011, new evidence has emerged that there are considerable risks associated with traditional energy sources, and that major changes to the mix of energy technologies is needed:

Several mining tragedies globally have underscored the human toll of the coal supply chain. New EPA initiatives targeting air toxics, coal ash, and effluent releases highlight the environmental impacts of coal and the cost of addressing them with control technologies. The use of fracking in natural gas exploration is coming under scrutiny, with evidence of groundwater contamination and greenhouse gas emissions. Concerns are increasing about the vast amounts of water used at coal-fired and nuclear power plants, particularly in regions of the country facing water shortages. Events at the Fukushima nuclear plant have renewed doubts about the ability to operate large numbers of nuclear plants safely over the long term. Further, cost estimates for "next generation" nuclear units continue to climb, and lenders are unwilling to finance these plants without taxpayer guarantees.

The 2014 REN21 Global Status Report says that renewable energies are no longer just energy sources, but ways to address pressing social, political, economic and environmental problems:

Today, renewables are seen not only as sources of energy, but also as tools to address many other pressing needs, including: improving energy security; reducing the health and environmental impacts associated with fossil and nuclear energy; mitigating greenhouse gas emissions; improving educational opportunities; creating jobs; reducing poverty; and increasing gender equality... Renewables have entered the mainstream.

=== Growth of renewables ===
Renewable energy capacity has steadily grown, led by solar photovoltaic power.

The countries most reliant on fossil fuels for electricity vary widely on how great a percentage of that electricity is generated from renewables, leaving wide variation in renewables' growth potential.

In 2008 for the first time, more renewable energy than conventional power capacity was added in both the European Union and United States, demonstrating a "fundamental transition" of the world's energy markets towards renewables, according to a report released by REN21, a global renewable energy policy network based in Paris. In 2010, renewable power consisted about a third of the newly built power generation capacities.

By the end of 2011, total renewable power capacity worldwide exceeded 1,360 GW, up 8%. Renewables producing electricity accounted for almost half of the 208 GW of capacity added globally during 2011. Wind and solar photovoltaics (PV) accounted for almost 40% and 30%. Based on REN21's 2014 report, renewables contributed 19% to our energy consumption and 22% to our electricity generation in 2012 and 2013, respectively. This energy consumption is divided as 9% coming from traditional biomass, 4.2% as heat energy (non-biomass), 3.8% hydro electricity and 2% electricity from wind, solar, geothermal, and biomass.

During the five-years from the end of 2004 through 2009, worldwide renewable energy capacity grew at rates of 10–60% annually for many technologies, while actual production grew 1.2% overall. In 2011, UN under-secretary general Achim Steiner said: "The continuing growth in this core segment of the green economy is not happening by chance. The combination of government target-setting, policy support and stimulus funds is underpinning the renewable industry's rise and bringing the much needed transformation of our global energy system within reach." He added: "Renewable energies are expanding both in terms of investment, projects and geographical spread. In doing so, they are making an increasing contribution to combating climate change, countering energy poverty and energy insecurity".

According to a 2011 projection by the International Energy Agency, solar power plants may produce most of the world's electricity within 50 years, significantly reducing the emissions of greenhouse gases that harm the environment. The IEA has said: "Photovoltaic and solar-thermal plants may meet most of the world's demand for electricity by 2060 – and half of all energy needs – with wind, hydropower and biomass plants supplying much of the remaining generation". "Photovoltaic and concentrated solar power together can become the major source of electricity".

| Selected renewable energy global indicators | 2008 | 2009 | 2010 | 2011 | 2012 | 2013 | 2014 | 2015 | 2016 | 2017 | 2018 | 2019 | 2020 |
Investment
| Investment in new renewable capacity (annual) (billion USD) | 182 | 178 | 237 | 279 | 256 | 232 | 270 | 285.9 | 241.6 | 279.8 | 289 | 302 | 304 |
Power
| Renewables power capacity (existing) (GWe) | 1,140 | 1,230 | 1,320 | 1,360 | 1,470 | 1,578 | 1,712 | 1,849 | 2,017 | 2,195 | 2,378 | 2,588 | 2,839 |
| Hydropower capacity (existing) (GWe) | 885 | 915 | 945 | 970 | 990 | 1,018 | 1,055 | 1,064 | 1,096 | 1,114 | 1,132 | 1,150 | 1,170 |
| Solar PV capacity (grid-connected) (GWe) | 16 | 23 | 40 | 70 | 100 | 138 | 177 | 227 | 303 | 402 | 505 | 627 | 760 |
| Wind power capacity (existing) (GWe) | 121 | 159 | 198 | 238 | 283 | 319 | 370 | 433 | 487 | 539 | 591 | 651 | 743 |
Heat
| Solar hot water capacity (existing) (2008-2018 GW_{th}, 2019-2020 EJ) | 130 | 160 | 185 | 232 | 255 | 373 | 406 | 435 | 456 | 472 | 480 GW_{th} (1.4 EJ) | 1.4 | 1.5 |
Transport
| Ethanol production (annual) (billion litres) | 67 | 76 | 86 | 86 | 83 | 87 | 94 | 98.8 | 98.6 | 106 | 112 | 114 | 105 |
| Biodiesel production, fatty acid methyl ester (annual) (billion litres) | 12 | 17.8 | 18.5 | 21.4 | 22.5 | 26 | 29.7 | 30.1 | 30.8 | 31 | 34 | 47 | 39 |
Policy
| Countries with renewable energy targets | 79 | 89 | 98 | 118 | 138 | 144 | 164 | 173 | 176 | 179 | 169 | 172 | 165 |
Source: REN21

In 2013, China led the world in renewable energy production, with a total capacity of 378 GW, mainly from hydroelectric and wind power. As of 2014, China leads the world in the production and use of wind power, solar photovoltaic power and smart grid technologies, generating almost as much water, wind and solar energy as all of France and Germany's power plants combined. China's renewable energy sector is growing faster than its fossil fuels and nuclear power capacity. Since 2005, production of solar cells in China has expanded 100-fold. As Chinese renewable manufacturing has grown, the costs of renewable energy technologies have dropped. Innovation has helped, but the main driver of reduced costs has been market expansion.

See also renewable energy in the United States for US-figures.

=== Economic trends ===
Costs of renewable energy, especially solar photovoltaic (solar panels), have declined significantly, with 62% of total renewable power generation added in 2020 having lower costs than the cheapest new fossil fuel option.

Renewable energy technologies are getting cheaper, through technological change and through the benefits of mass production and market competition. A 2011 IEA report said: "A portfolio of renewable energy technologies is becoming cost-competitive in an increasingly broad range of circumstances, in some cases providing investment opportunities without the need for specific economic support," and added that "cost reductions in critical technologies, such as wind and solar, are set to continue." As of 2011, there have been substantial reductions in the cost of solar and wind technologies:

The price of PV modules per MW has fallen by 60 percent since the summer of 2008, according to Bloomberg New Energy Finance estimates, putting solar power for the first time on a competitive footing with the retail price of electricity in a number of sunny countries. Wind turbine prices have also fallen – by 18 percent per MW in the last two years – reflecting, as with solar, fierce competition in the supply chain. Further improvements in the levelised cost of energy for solar, wind and other technologies lie ahead, posing a growing threat to the dominance of fossil fuel generation sources in the next few years.

In 2012, Hydro-electricity and geothermal electricity produced at favourable sites were the cheapest way to generate electricity. Renewable energy costs continue to drop, and the levelised cost of electricity (LCOE) is declining for wind power, solar photovoltaic (PV), concentrated solar power (CSP) and some biomass technologies.

Renewable energy is also the most economic solution for new grid-connected capacity in areas with good resources. As the cost of renewable power falls, the scope of economically viable applications increases. Renewable technologies are now often the most economic solution for new generating capacity. Where "oil-fired generation is the predominant power generation source (e.g. on islands, off-grid and in some countries) a lower-cost renewable solution almost always exists today". As of 2012, renewable power generation technologies accounted for around half of all new power generation capacity additions globally. In 2011, additions included 41 gigawatt (GW) of new wind power capacity, 30 GW of PV, 25 GW of hydro-electricity, 6 GW of biomass, 0.5 GW of CSP, and 0.1 GW of geothermal power.

=== Three generations of technologies ===
Renewable energy includes a number of sources and technologies at different stages of commercialization. The International Energy Agency (IEA) has defined three generations of renewable energy technologies, reaching back over 100 years:

- "First-generation technologies emerged from the industrial revolution at the end of the 19th century and include hydropower, biomass combustion, geothermal power and heat. These technologies are quite widely used.
- Second-generation technologies include solar heating and cooling, wind power, modern forms of bioenergy, and solar photovoltaics. These are now entering markets as a result of research, development and demonstration (RD&D) investments since the 1980s. Initial investment was prompted by energy security concerns linked to the oil crises of the 1970s but the enduring appeal of these technologies is due, at least in part, to environmental benefits. Many of the technologies reflect significant advancements in materials.
- Third-generation technologies are still under development and include advanced biomass gasification, biorefinery technologies, concentrating solar thermal power, hot-dry-rock geothermal power, and ocean energy. Advances in nanotechnology may also play a major role".

First-generation technologies are well established, second-generation technologies are entering markets, and third-generation technologies heavily depend on long-term research and development commitments, where the public sector has a role to play.

== First-generation technologies ==
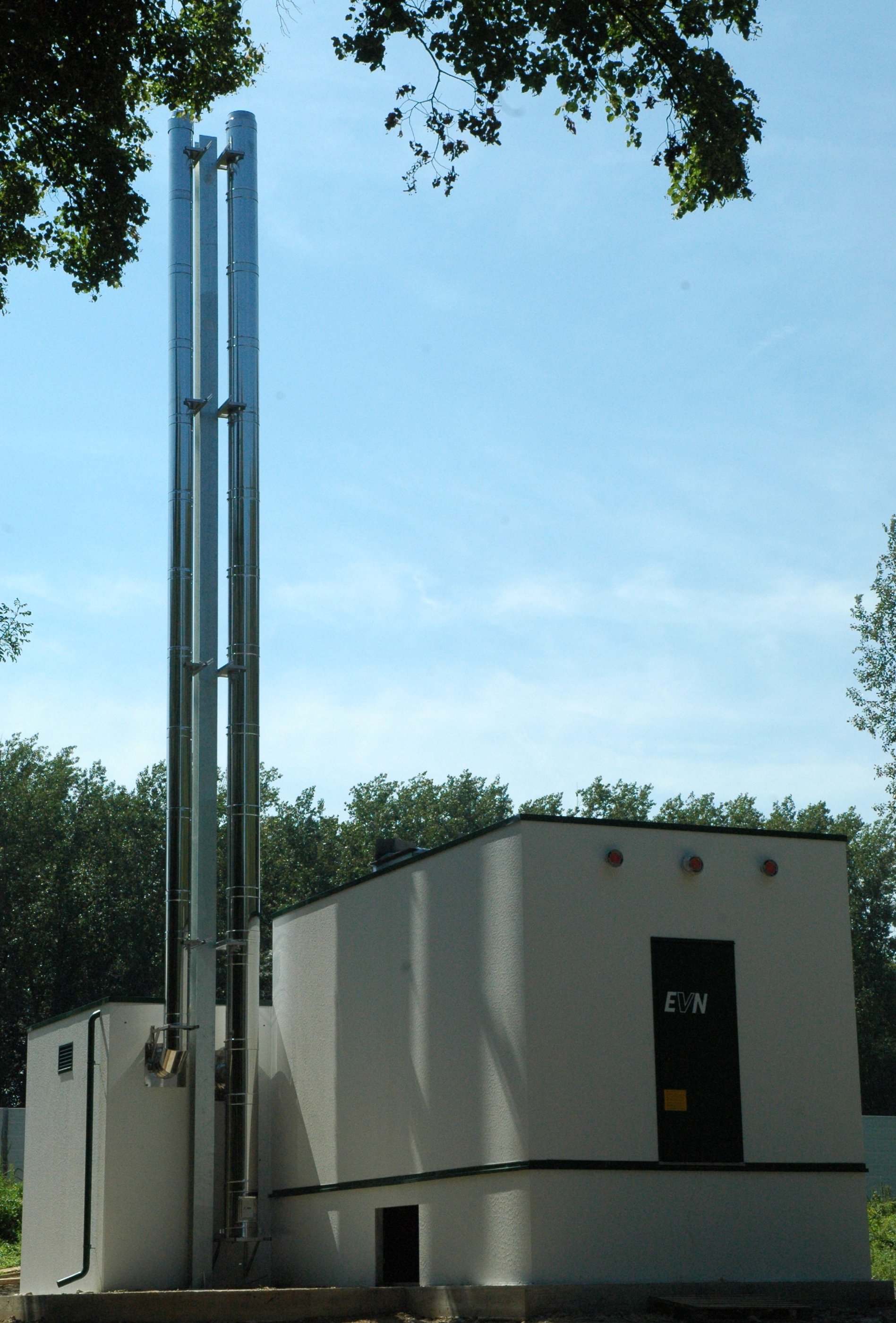
Biomass heating plant in Austria. The total heat power is about 1000 kW.

First-generation technologies are widely used in locations with abundant resources. Their future use depends on the exploration of the remaining resource potential, particularly in developing countries, and on overcoming challenges related to the environment and social acceptance.

=== Biomass ===
Biomass, the burning of organic materials for heat and power, is a fully mature technology. Unlike most renewable sources, biomass (and hydropower) can supply stable base load power generation.

Biomass produces CO_{2} emissions on combustion, and the issue of whether biomass is carbon neutral is contested. Material directly combusted in cook stoves produces pollutants, leading to severe health and environmental consequences. Improved cook stove programs are alleviating some of these effects.

The industry remained relatively stagnant over the decade to 2007, but demand for biomass (mostly wood) continues to grow in many developing countries, as well as Brazil and Germany.

The economic viability of biomass is dependent on regulated tariffs, due to high costs of infrastructure and ingredients for ongoing operations. Biomass does offer a ready disposal mechanism by burning municipal, agricultural, and industrial organic waste products. First-generation biomass technologies can be economically competitive, but may still require deployment support to overcome public acceptance and small-scale issues. As part of the food vs. fuel debate, several economists from Iowa State University found in 2008 "there is no evidence to disprove that the primary objective of biofuel policy is to support farm income."

=== Hydroelectricity ===
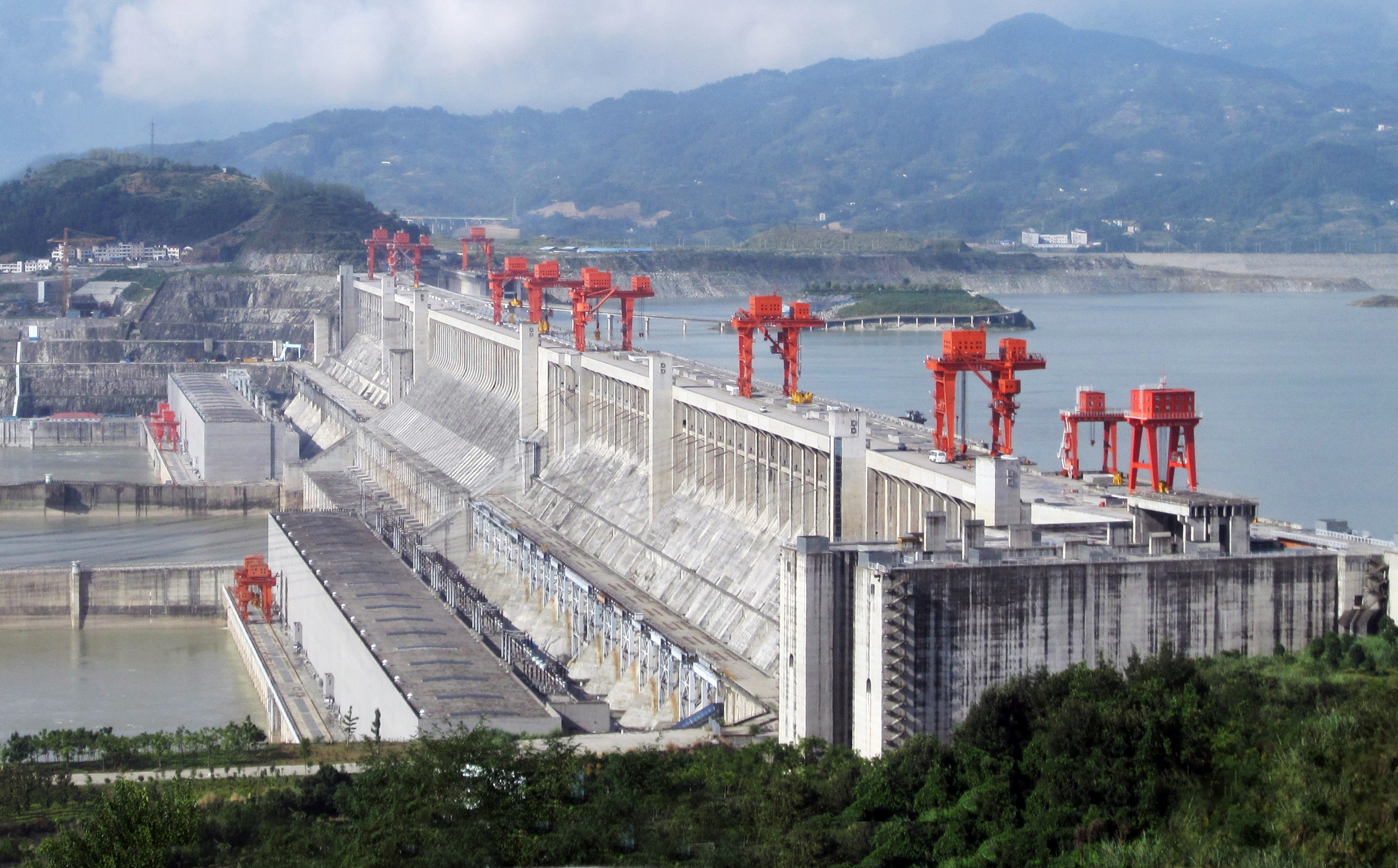
The 22,500 MW Three Gorges Dam in the People's Republic of China, the largest hydroelectric power station in the world

Hydroelectricity is the term referring to electricity generated by hydropower; the production of electrical power through the use of the gravitational force of falling or flowing water. In 2015 hydropower generated 16.6% of the worlds total electricity and 70% of all renewable electricity and is expected to increase about 3.1% each year for the next 25 years. Hydroelectric plants have the advantage of being long-lived and many existing plants have operated for more than 100 years.

Hydropower is produced in 150 countries, with the Asia-Pacific region generating 32 percent of global hydropower in 2010. China is the largest hydroelectricity producer, with 721 terawatt-hours of production in 2010, representing around 17 percent of domestic electricity use. There are now three hydroelectricity plants larger than 10 GW: the Three Gorges Dam in China, Itaipu Dam across the Brazil/Paraguay border, and Guri Dam in Venezuela. The cost of hydroelectricity is low, making it a competitive source of renewable electricity. The average cost of electricity from a hydro plant larger than 10 megawatts is 3 to 5 U.S. cents per kilowatt-hour.

=== Geothermal power and heat ===
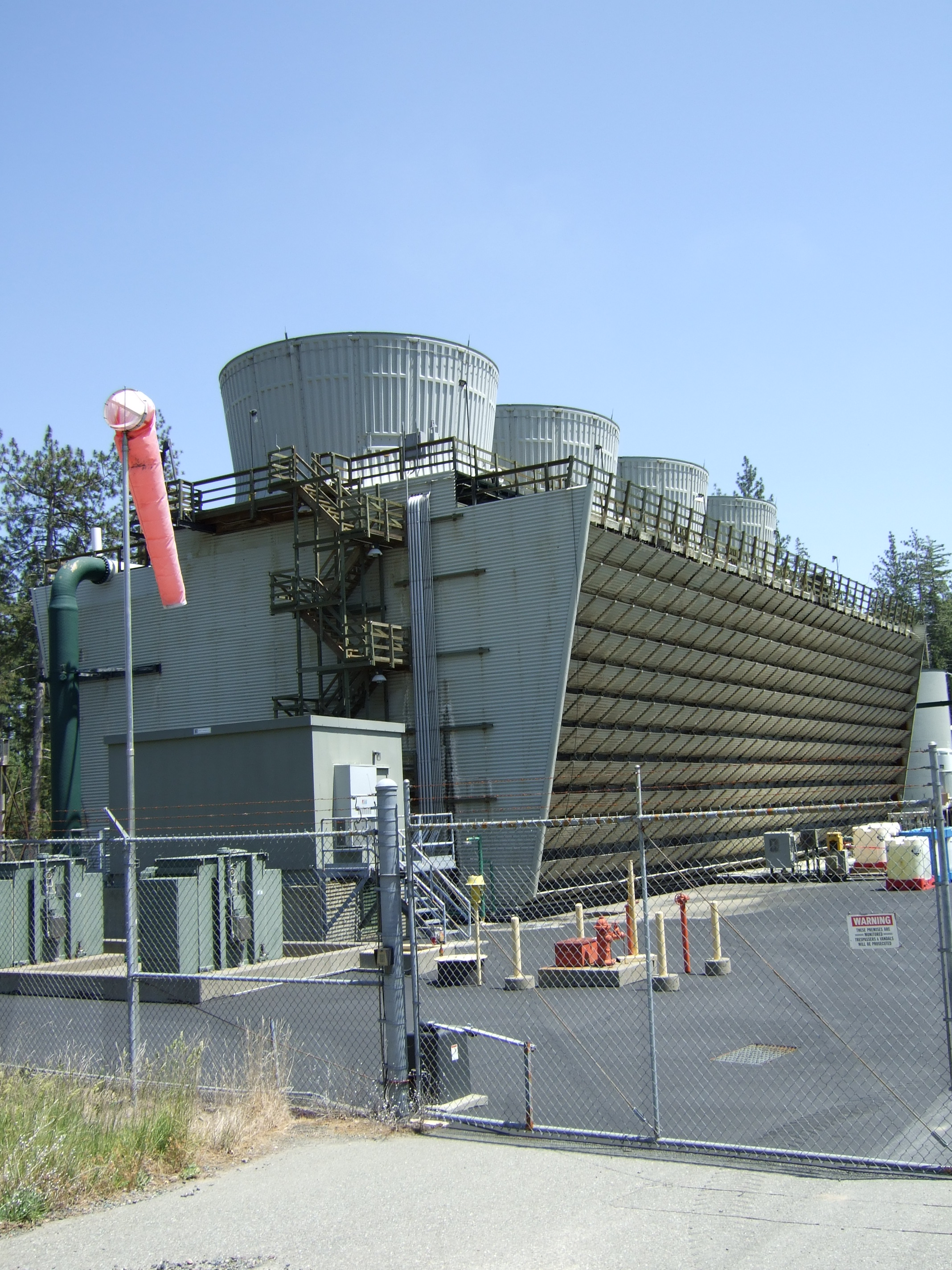
One of many power plants at The Geysers, a geothermal power field in northern California, with a total output of over 750 MW.

Geothermal power plants can operate 24 hours per day, providing baseload capacity. Estimates for the world potential capacity for geothermal power generation vary widely, ranging from 40 GW by 2020 to as much as 6,000 GW.

Geothermal power capacity grew from around 1 GW in 1975 to almost 10 GW in 2008. The United States is the world leader in terms of installed capacity, representing 3.1 GW. Other countries with significant installed capacity include the Philippines (1.9 GW), Indonesia (1.2 GW), Mexico (1.0 GW), Italy (0.8 GW), Iceland (0.6 GW), Japan (0.5 GW), and New Zealand (0.5 GW). In some countries, geothermal power accounts for a significant share of the total electricity supply, such as in the Philippines, where geothermal represented 17 percent of the total power mix at the end of 2008.

Geothermal (ground source) heat pumps represented an estimated 30 GWth of installed capacity at the end of 2008, with other direct uses of geothermal heat (i.e., for space heating, agricultural drying and other uses) reaching an estimated 15 GWth. As of 2008, at least 76 countries use direct geothermal energy in some form.

== Second-generation technologies ==
Second‑generation technologies have shifted from niche interests to a significant economic sector. Large industrial companies and financial institutions now participate in this area, and the ongoing challenge is to expand the market base to support continued global growth.

=== Solar heating ===
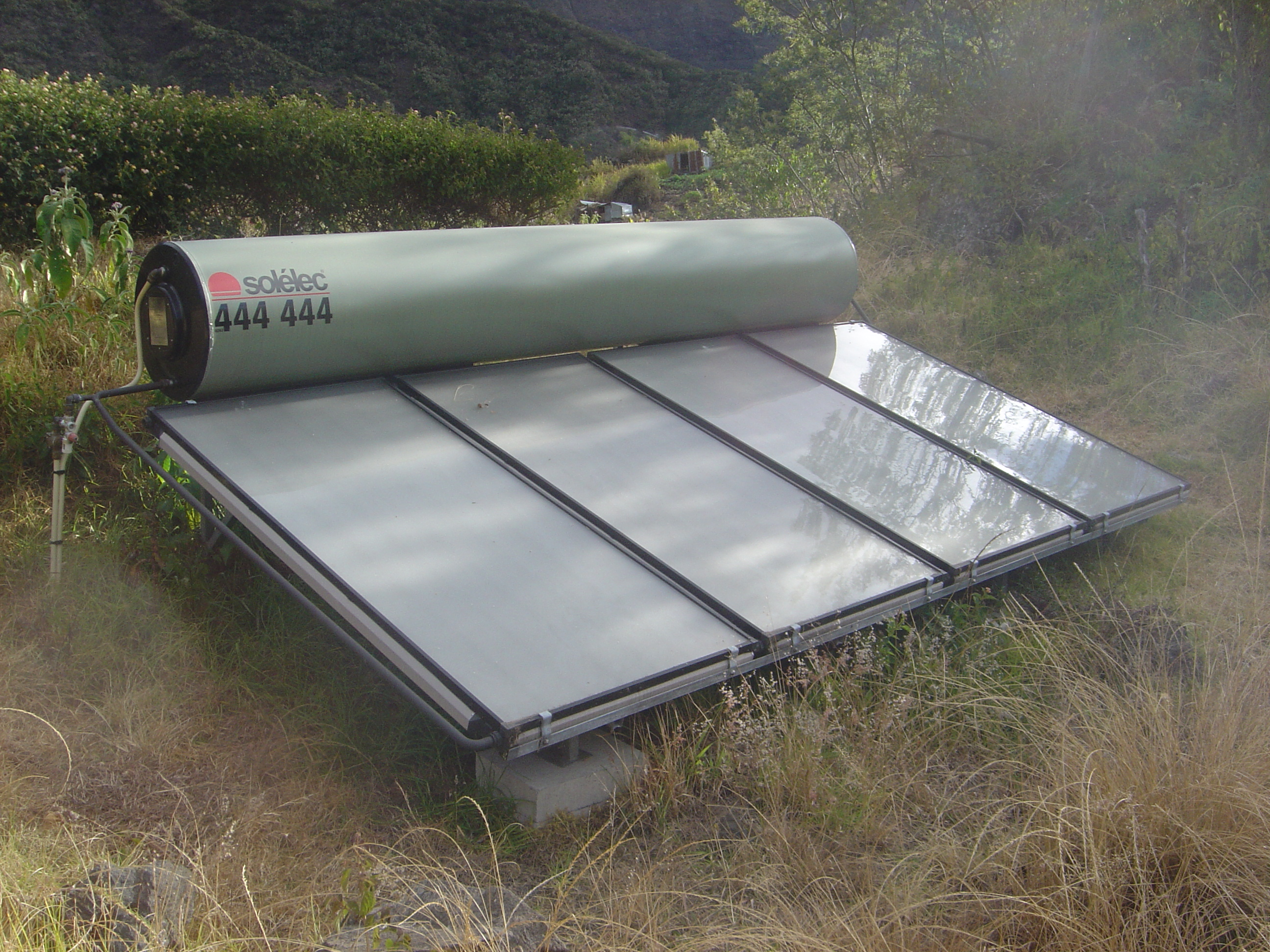
Solar energy technologies, such as solar water heaters, located on or near the buildings which they supply with energy, are a prime example of a soft energy technology.

Solar heating systems are a well known second-generation technology and generally consist of solar thermal collectors, a fluid system to move the heat from the collector to its point of usage, and a reservoir or tank for heat storage. The systems may be used to heat domestic hot water, swimming pools, or homes and businesses. The heat can also be used for industrial process applications or as an energy input for other uses such as cooling equipment.

In many warmer climates, a solar heating system can provide a very high percentage (50 to 75%) of domestic hot water energy. As of 2009, China has 27 million rooftop solar water heaters.

=== Photovoltaics ===
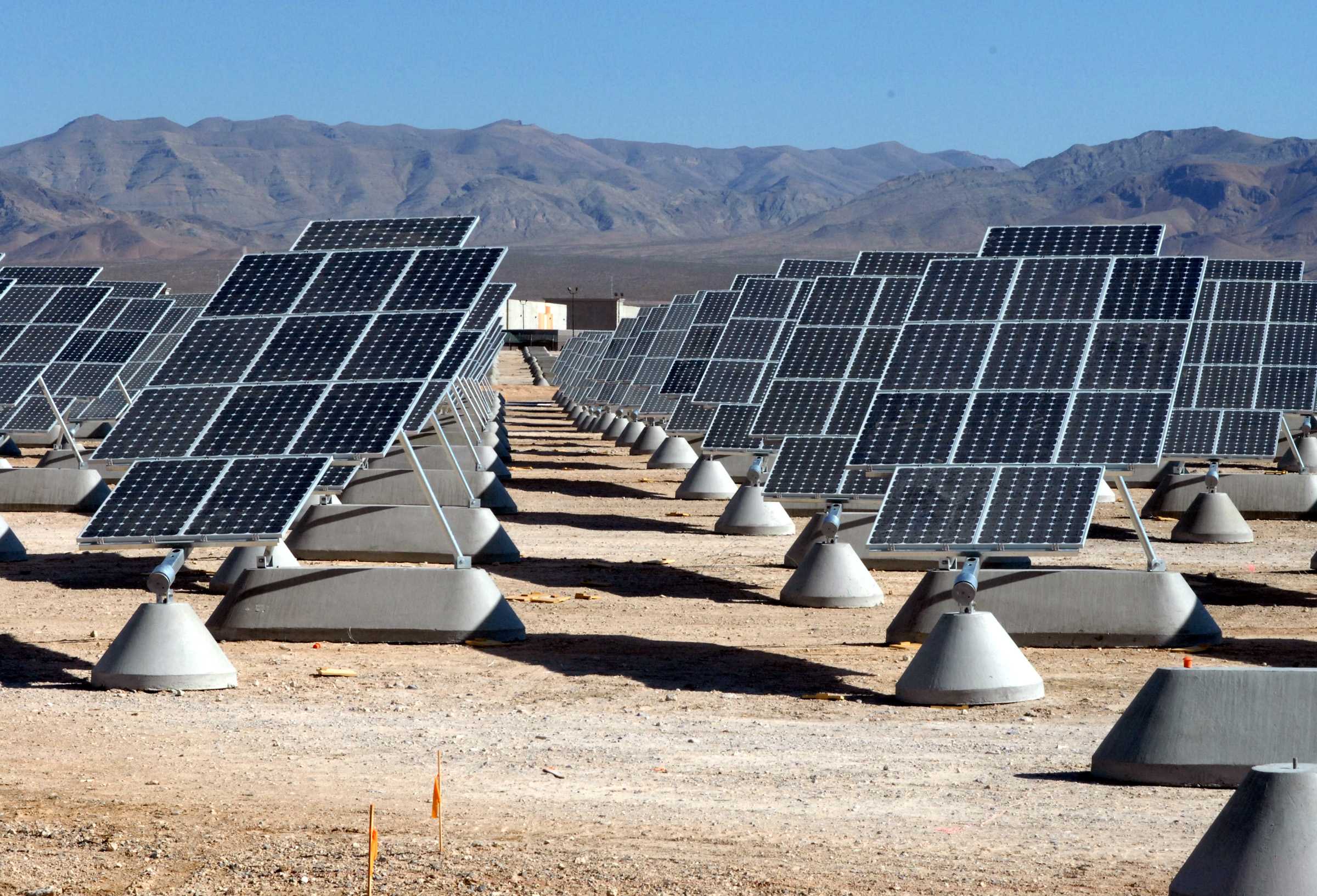
Nellis Solar Power Plant at Nellis Air Force Base. These panels track the sun in one axis.

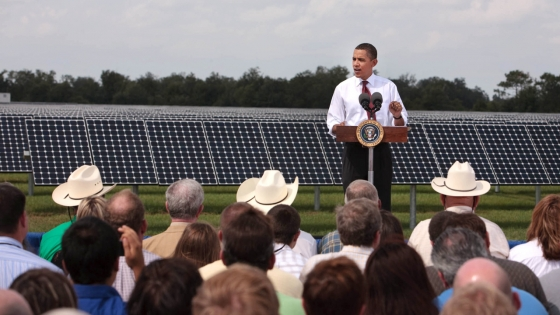
Barack Obama speaks at the DeSoto Next Generation Solar Energy Center

Photovoltaic (PV) cells, also called solar cells, convert light into electricity. In the 1980s and early 1990s, most photovoltaic modules were used to provide remote-area power supply, but from around 1995, industry efforts have focused increasingly on developing building integrated photovoltaics and photovoltaic power stations for grid connected applications.

Many plants are integrated with agriculture and some use innovative tracking systems that follow the sun's daily path across the sky to generate more electricity than conventional fixed-mounted systems. There are no fuel costs or emissions during operation of the power stations.

=== Wind power ===
Wind power: worldwide installed capacity

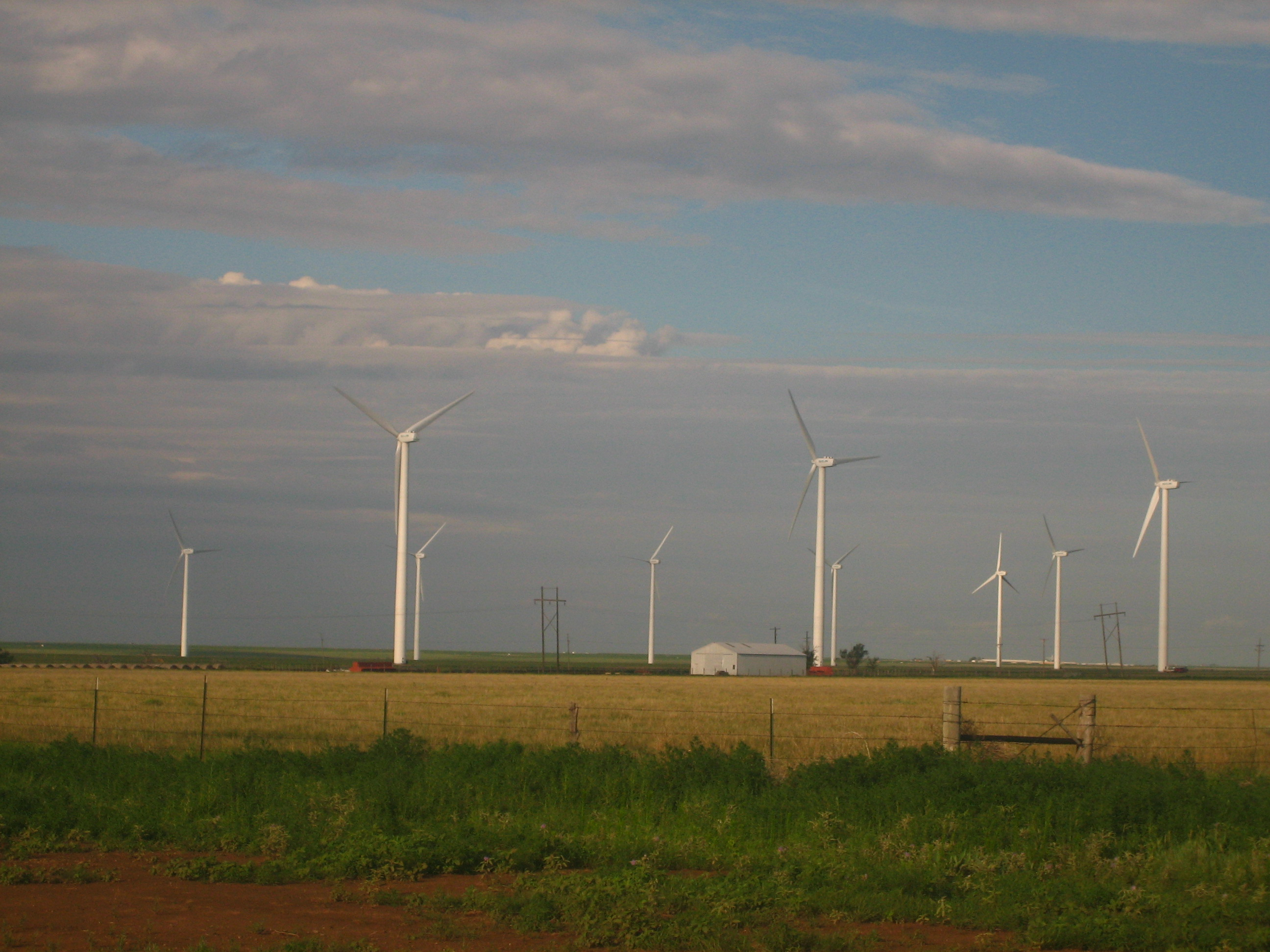
Landowners in the US typically receive $3,000 to $5,000 per year in rental income from each wind turbine, while farmers continue to grow crops or graze cattle up to the foot of the turbines.

Some of the second-generation renewables, such as wind power, have high potential and have already realised relatively low production costs. Wind power could become cheaper than nuclear power. Global wind power installations increased by 35,800 MW in 2010, bringing total installed capacity up to 194,400 MW, a 22.5% increase on the 158,700 MW installed at the end of 2009. The increase for 2010 represents investments totalling €47.3 billion (US$65 billion) and for the first time more than half of all new wind power was added outside of the traditional markets of Europe and North America, mainly driven, by the continuing boom in China which accounted for nearly half of all of the installations at 16,500 MW. China now has 42,300 MW of wind power installed. Wind power accounts for approximately 19% of electricity generated in Denmark, 9% in Spain and Portugal, and 6% in Germany and the Republic of Ireland. In Australian state of South Australia wind power, championed by Premier Mike Rann (2002–2011), now comprises 26% of the state's electricity generation, edging out coal fired power. At the end of 2011 South Australia, with 7.2% of Australia's population, had 54% of the nation's installed wind power capacity.

Wind power's share of worldwide electricity usage at the end of 2014 was 3.1%.

The wind industry is able to produce more power at lower cost by using taller wind turbines with longer blades, capturing the faster winds at higher elevations. This has opened up new opportunities and in Indiana, Michigan, and Ohio, the price of power from wind turbines built 300 feet to 400 feet above the ground can now compete with conventional fossil fuels like coal. Prices have fallen to about 4 cents per kilowatt-hour in some cases and utilities have been increasing the amount of wind energy in their portfolio, saying it is their cheapest option.

=== Solar thermal power stations ===
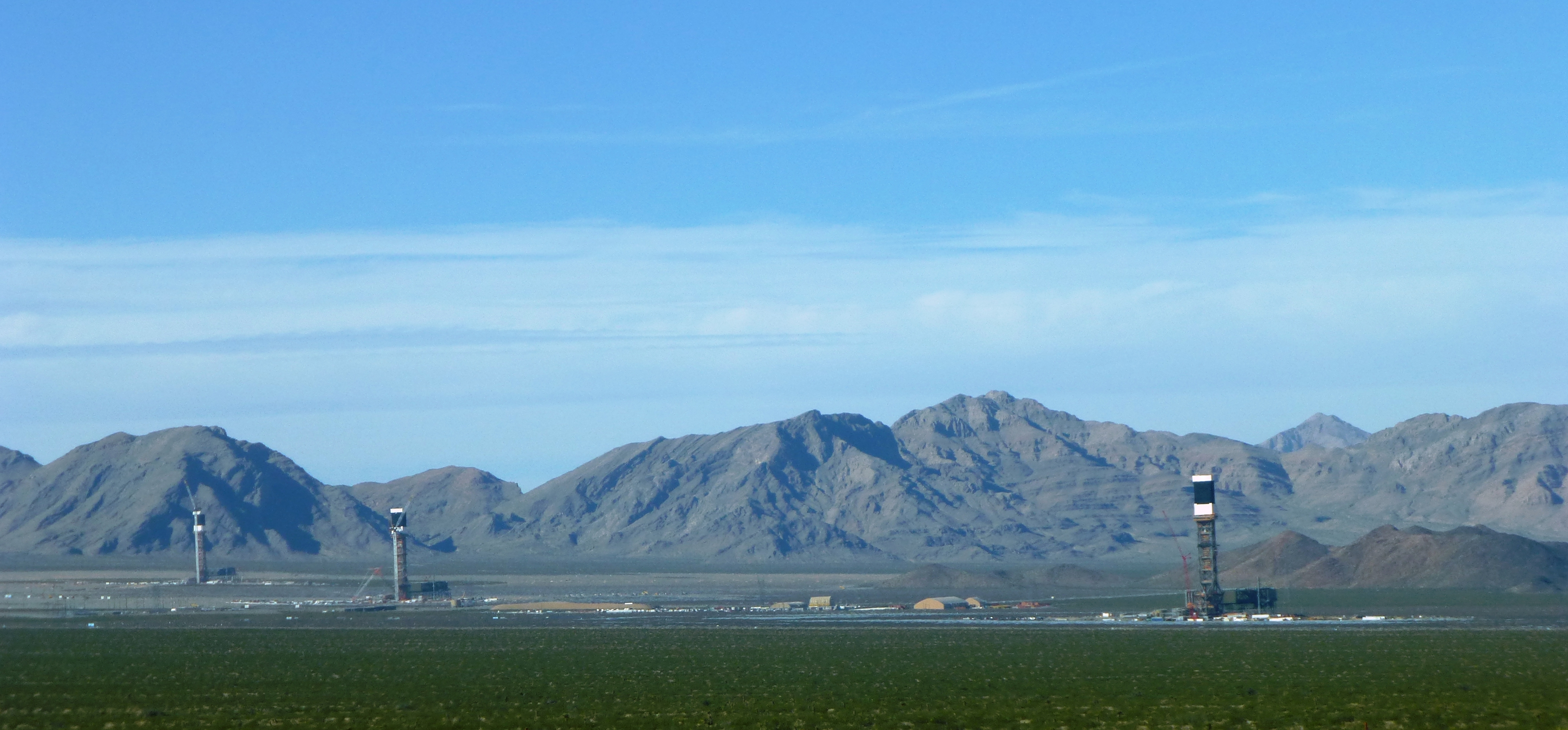
View of Ivanpah Solar Electric Generating System from Yates Well Road, San Bernardino County, California. The Clark Mountain Range can be seen in the distance.

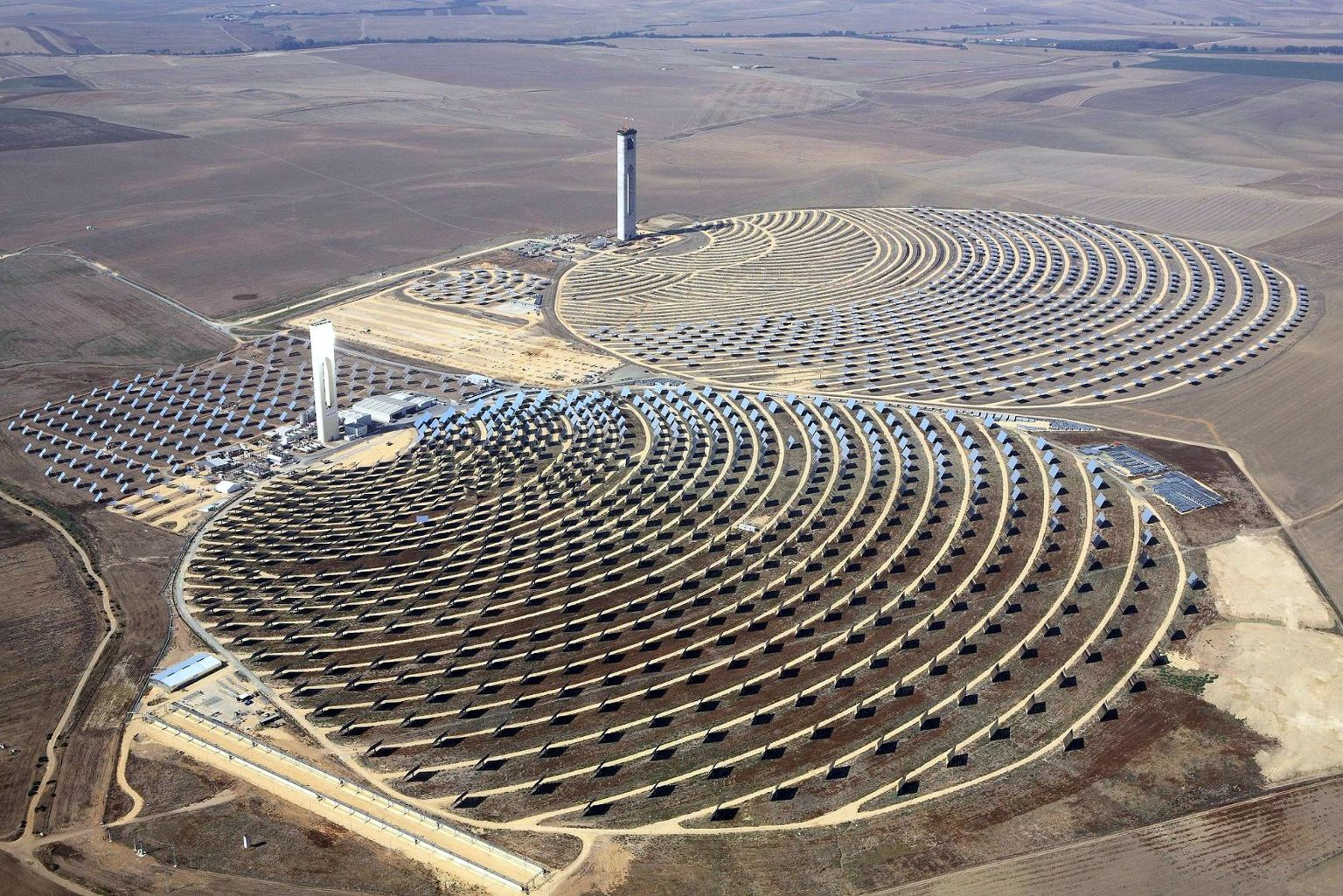
Solar Towers from left: PS10, PS20.

Solar thermal power stations include the 354 megawatt (MW) Solar Energy Generating Systems power plant in the US, Solnova Solar Power Station (Spain, 150 MW), Andasol solar power station (Spain, 100 MW), Nevada Solar One (USA, 64 MW), PS20 solar power tower (Spain, 20 MW), and the PS10 solar power tower (Spain, 11 MW). The 370 MW Ivanpah Solar Power Facility, located in California's Mojave Desert, is the world's largest solar-thermal power plant project currently under construction. Many other plants are under construction or planned, mainly in Spain and the USA. In developing countries, three World Bank projects for integrated solar thermal/combined-cycle gas-turbine power plants in Egypt, Mexico, and Morocco have been approved.

=== Modern forms of bioenergy ===
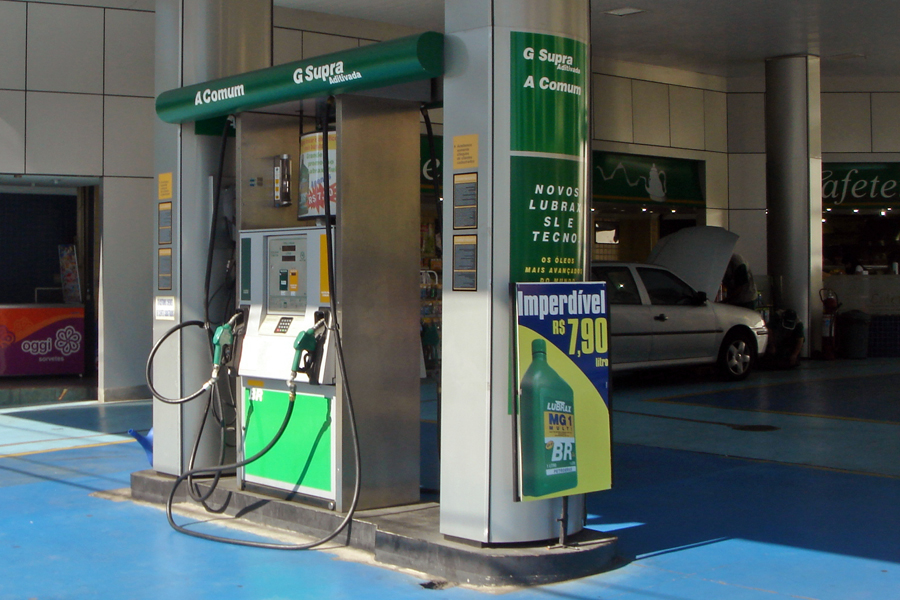
Neat ethanol on the left (A), gasoline on the right (G) at a filling station in Brazil.

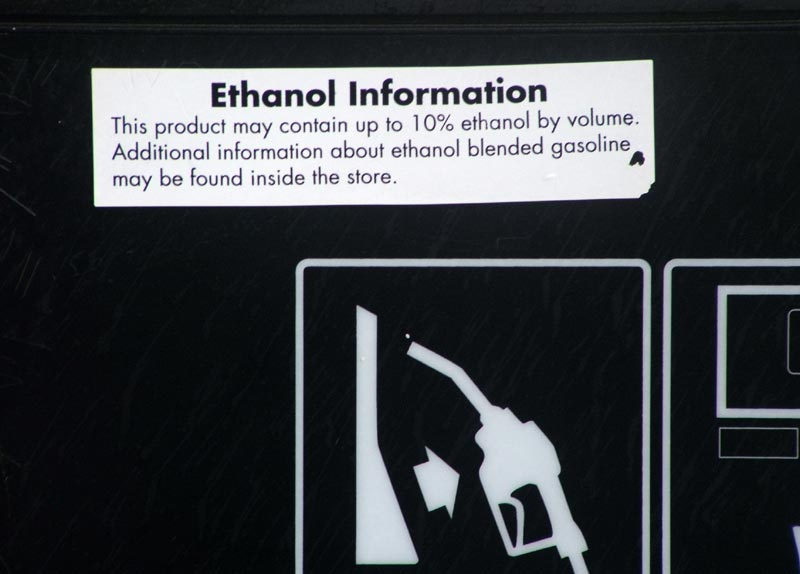
Information on pump, California

Global ethanol production for transport fuel tripled between 2000 and 2007 from 17 billion to more than 52 billion litres, while biodiesel expanded more than tenfold from less than 1 billion to almost 11 billion litres. Biofuels provide 1.8% of the world's transport fuel and recent estimates indicate a continued high growth. The main producing countries for transport biofuels are the US, Brazil, and the EU.

Brazil has one of the largest renewable energy programs in the world, involving production of ethanol fuel from sugar cane, and ethanol now provides 18 percent of the country's automotive fuel. As a result of this and the exploitation of domestic deep water oil sources, Brazil, which for years had to import a large share of the petroleum needed for domestic consumption, recently reached complete self-sufficiency in liquid fuels.

Nearly all the gasoline sold in the United States today is mixed with 10 percent ethanol, a mix known as E10, and motor vehicle manufacturers already produce vehicles designed to run on much higher ethanol blends. Ford, DaimlerChrysler, and GM are among the automobile companies that sell flexible-fuel cars, trucks, and minivans that can use gasoline and ethanol blends ranging from pure gasoline up to 85% ethanol (E85). The challenge is to expand the market for biofuels beyond the farm states where they have been most popular to date. The Energy Policy Act of 2005, which calls for 7.5 billion US gallons (28,000,000 m^{3}) of biofuels to be used annually by 2012, will also help to expand the market.

The growing ethanol and biodiesel industries are providing jobs in plant construction, operations, and maintenance, mostly in rural communities. According to the Renewable Fuels Association, "the ethanol industry created almost 154,000 U.S. jobs in 2005 alone, boosting household income by $5.7 billion. It also contributed about $3.5 billion in tax revenues at the local, state, and federal levels".

== Third-generation technologies ==
Third-generation renewable energy technologies are still under development and include advanced biomass gasification, biorefinery technologies, hot-dry-rock geothermal power, and ocean energy. Third-generation technologies are not yet widely demonstrated or have limited commercialization. Many are on the horizon and may have potential comparable to other renewable energy technologies, but still depend on attracting sufficient attention and research and development funding.

=== New bioenergy technologies ===
Selected Commercial Cellulosic Ethanol Plants in the U.S.
| Company | Location | Feedstock |
|---|---|---|
| Abengoa Bioenergy | Hugoton, KS | Wheat straw |
| BlueFire Ethanol | Irvine, CA | Multiple sources |
| Gulf Coast Energy | Mossy Head, FL | Wood waste |
| Mascoma | Lansing, MI | Wood |
| POET LLC | Emmetsburg, IA | Corn cobs |
| SunOpta | Little Falls, MN | Wood chips |
| Xethanol | Auburndale, FL | Citrus peels |
Note: plants are either operational or under construction

According to the International Energy Agency, cellulosic ethanol biorefineries could allow biofuels to play a much bigger role in the future than organizations such as the IEA previously thought. Cellulosic ethanol can be made from plant matter composed primarily of inedible cellulose fibers that form the stems and branches of most plants. Crop residues (such as corn stalks, wheat straw and rice straw), wood waste, and municipal solid waste are potential sources of cellulosic biomass. Dedicated energy crops, such as switchgrass, are also promising cellulose sources that can be sustainably produced in many regions.

=== Ocean energy ===
Ocean energy is all forms of renewable energy derived from the sea including wave energy, tidal energy, river current, ocean current energy, offshore wind, salinity gradient energy and ocean thermal gradient energy.

The Rance Tidal Power Station (240 MW) is the world's first tidal power station. The facility is located on the estuary of the Rance River, in Brittany, France. Opened on 26 November 1966, it is currently operated by Électricité de France, and is the largest tidal power station in the world, in terms of installed capacity.

First proposed more than thirty years ago, systems to harvest utility-scale electrical power from ocean waves have recently been gaining momentum as a viable technology. The potential for this technology is considered promising, especially on west-facing coasts with latitudes between 40 and 60 degrees:

In the United Kingdom, for example, the Carbon Trust recently estimated the extent of the economically viable offshore resource at 55 TWh per year, about 14% of current national demand. Across Europe, the technologically achievable resource has been estimated to be at least 280 TWh per year. In 2003, the U.S. Electric Power Research Institute (EPRI) estimated the viable resource in the United States at 255 TWh per year (6% of demand).

There are currently nine projects, completed or in-development, off the coasts of the United Kingdom, United States, Spain and Australia to harness the rise and fall of waves by Ocean Power Technologies. The current maximum power output is 1.5 MW (Reedsport, Oregon), with development underway for 100 MW (Coos Bay, Oregon).

=== Enhanced geothermal systems ===
As of 2008, geothermal power development was under way in more than 40 countries, partially attributable to the development of new technologies, such as Enhanced Geothermal Systems. The development of binary cycle power plants and improvements in drilling and extraction technology may enable enhanced geothermal systems over a much greater geographical range than "traditional" Geothermal systems. Demonstration EGS projects are operational in the US, Australia, Germany, France, and the United Kingdom.

=== Advanced solar concepts ===
Beyond established solar photovoltaic and solar thermal power technologies, a number of advanced solar energy concepts have been proposed, including the solar updraft tower and space-based solar power. These concepts remain largely experimental and, as of yet, have not been commercially deployed.

The Solar updraft tower (SUT) is a renewable-energy power plant for generating electricity from low temperature solar heat. Sunshine heats the air beneath a very wide greenhouse-like roofed collector structure surrounding the central base of a very tall chimney tower. The resulting convection causes a hot air updraft in the tower by the chimney effect. This airflow drives wind turbines placed in the chimney updraft or around the chimney base to produce electricity. Plans for scaled-up versions of demonstration models will allow significant power generation, and may allow development of other applications, such as water extraction or distillation, and agriculture or horticulture. To view a study on the solar updraft tower and its affects click here.

A more advanced version of a similarly themed technology is the Vortex engine (AVE) which aims to replace large physical chimneys with a vortex of air created by a shorter, less-expensive structure.

Space-based solar power (SBSP) is the concept of collecting solar power in space (using an "SPS", that is, a "solar-power satellite" or a "satellite power system") for use on Earth. It has been in research since the early 1970s. SBSP would differ from current solar collection methods in that the means used to collect energy would reside on an orbiting satellite instead of on Earth's surface. Some projected benefits of such a system are a higher collection rate and a longer collection period due to the lack of a diffusing atmosphere and night time in space.

== Renewable energy industry ==
Solar and wind power are scaling up faster than previous sources of electricity. Declining costs, modular design, and improved battery storage help the transition to renewable energy.

In 2025, growth in solar, wind and other low-carbon electric power exceeded the overall growth in demand for electricity, reducing reliance on fossil fuels and helping to curb greenhouse gas emissions.

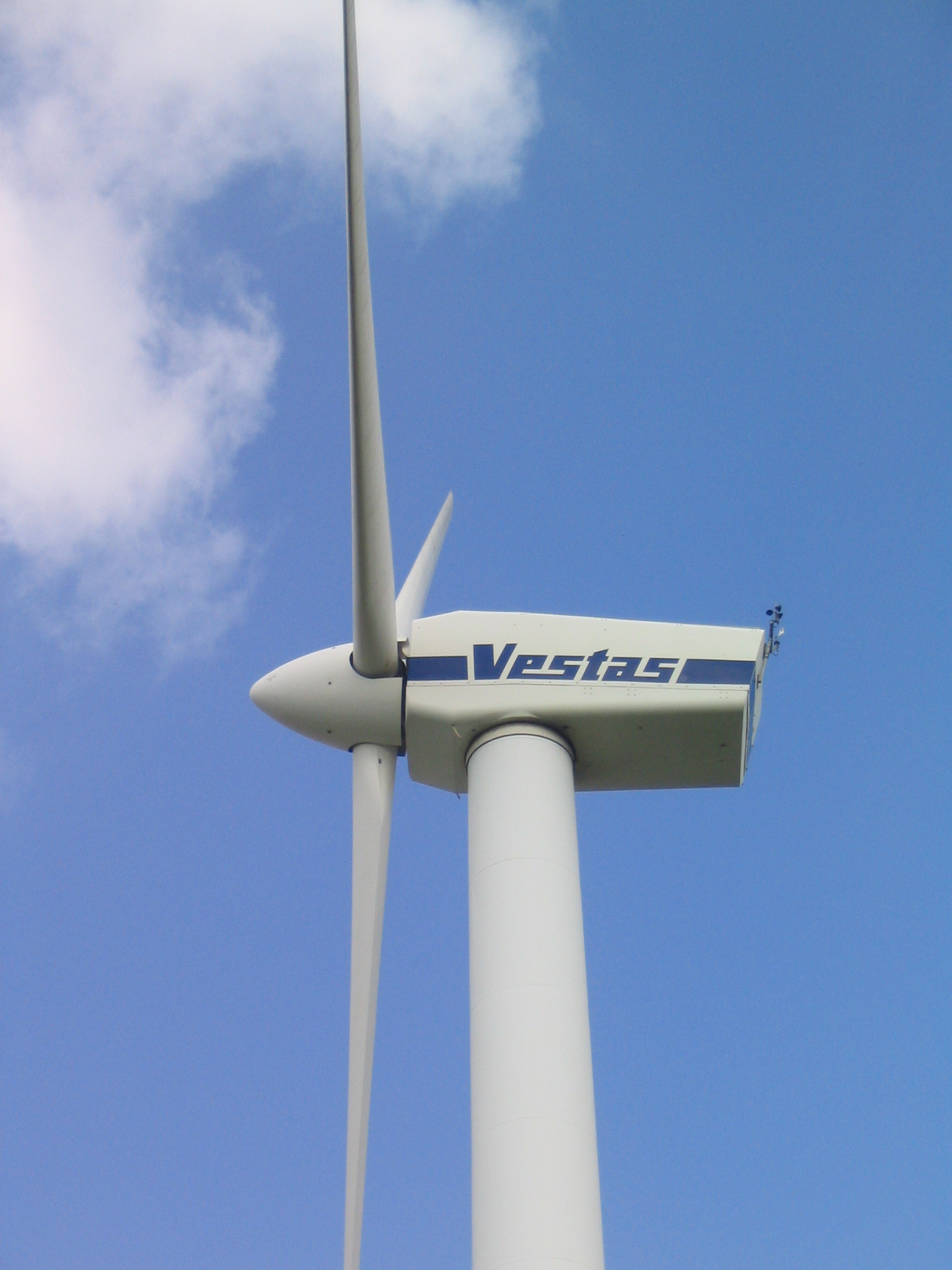
A Vestas wind turbine

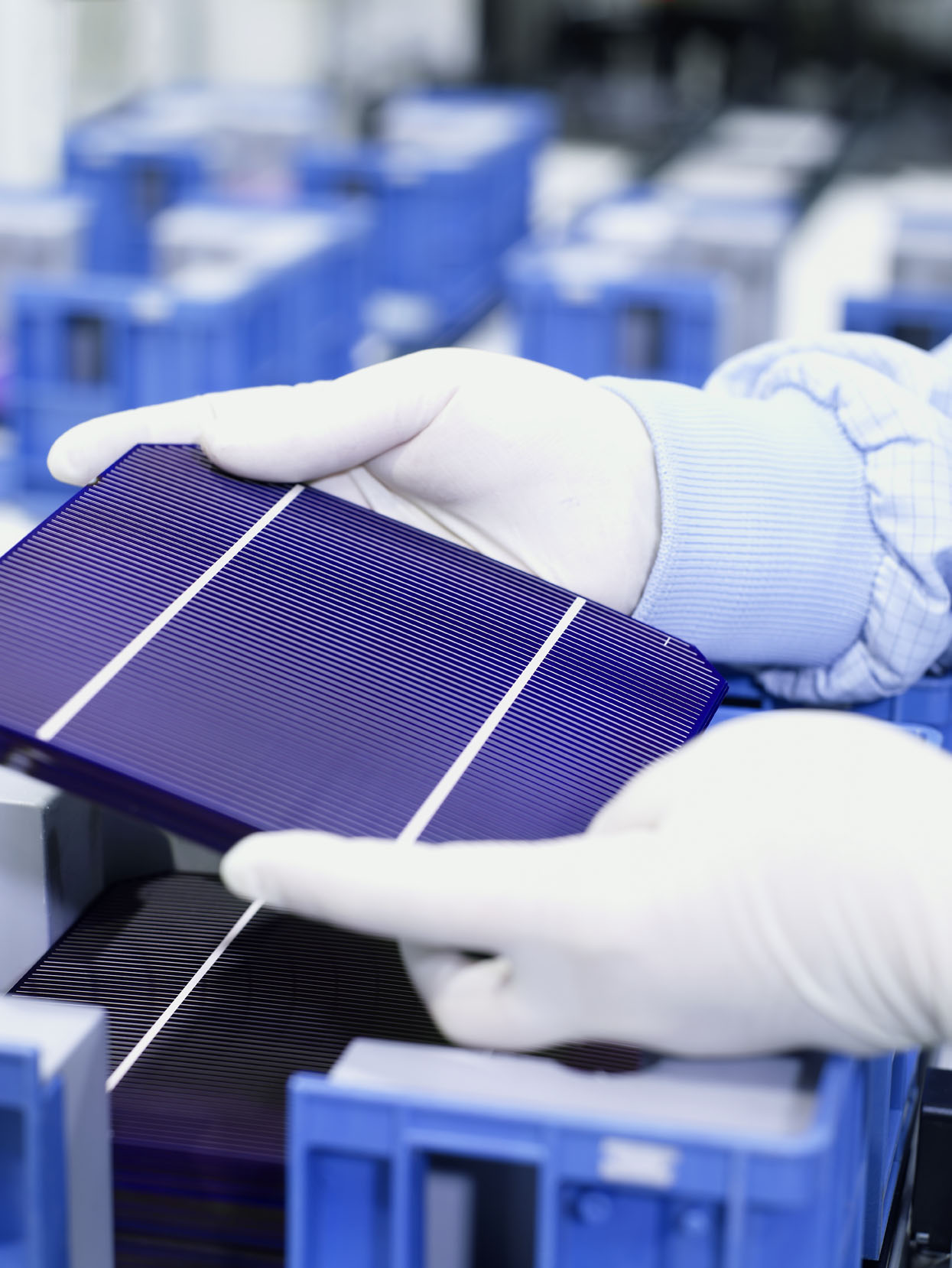
Monocrystalline solar cell

Total investment in renewable energy reached $211 billion in 2010, up from $160 billion in 2009. The top countries for investment in 2010 were China, Germany, the United States, Italy, and Brazil. Continued growth for the renewable energy sector is expected and promotional policies helped the industry weather the 2009 economic crisis better than many other sectors.

=== Wind power companies ===
As of 2010, Vestas (from Denmark) is the world's top wind turbine manufacturer in terms of percentage of market volume, and Sinovel (from China) is in second place. Together Vestas and Sinovel delivered 10,228 MW of new wind power capacity in 2010, and their market share was 25.9 percent. GE Energy (USA) was in third place, closely followed by Goldwind, another Chinese supplier. German Enercon ranks fifth in the world, and is followed in sixth place by Indian-based Suzlon.

=== Photovoltaic market trends ===
The solar PV market has been growing for the past few years. According to solar PV research company, PVinsights, worldwide shipment of solar modules in 2011 was around 25 GW, and the shipment year over year growth was around 40%. The top 5 solar module players in 2011 in turns are Suntech, First Solar, Yingli, Trina, and Sungen. The top 5 solar module companies possessed 51.3% market share of solar modules, according to PVinsights' market intelligence report.

| 2013 Ranking | Solar Module Company | Change from 2012 | Country |
|---|---|---|---|
| 1 | Yingli Green Energy | – | China |
| 2 | Trina Solar | +1 | China |
| 3 | Sharp Solar | +3 | Japan |
| 4 | Canadian Solar | – | Canada |
| 5 | Jinko Solar | +3 | China |
| 6 | ReneSola | +7 | China |
| 7 | First Solar | −2 | United States |
| 8 | Hanwha Solarone | +2 | South Korea |
| 9 | Kyocera | +5 | Japan |
| 10 | JA Solar | −3 | China |

The PV industry has seen drops in module prices since 2008. In late 2011, factory-gate prices for crystalline-silicon photovoltaic modules dropped below the $1.00/W mark. The $1.00/W installed cost, is often regarded in the PV industry as marking the achievement of grid parity for PV. These reductions have taken many stakeholders, including industry analysts, by surprise, and perceptions of current solar power economics often lags behind reality. Some stakeholders still have the perspective that solar PV remains too costly on an unsubsidized basis to compete with conventional generation options. Yet technological advancements, manufacturing process improvements, and industry re-structuring, mean that further price reductions are likely in coming years.

== Non-technical barriers to acceptance ==
Acceptance of wind and solar facilities in one's community is stronger among Democrats (blue), while acceptance of nuclear power plants is stronger among Republicans (red).

Many energy markets, institutions, and policies have been developed to support the production and use of fossil fuels. Newer and cleaner technologies may offer social and environmental benefits, but utility operators often reject renewable resources because they are trained to think only in terms of big, conventional power plants. Consumers often ignore renewable power systems because they are not given accurate price signals about electricity consumption. Intentional market distortions (such as subsidies), and unintentional market distortions (such as split incentives) may work against renewables. Benjamin K. Sovacool has argued that "some of the most surreptitious, yet powerful, impediments facing renewable energy and energy efficiency in the United States are more about culture and institutions than engineering and science".

The obstacles to the widespread commercialization of renewable energy technologies are primarily political, not technical, and there have been many studies which have identified a range of "non-technical barriers" to renewable energy use. These barriers are impediments which put renewable energy at a marketing, institutional, or policy disadvantage relative to other forms of energy. Key barriers include:

- Difficulty overcoming established energy systems, which includes difficulty introducing innovative energy systems, particularly for distributed generation such as photovoltaics, because of technological lock-in, electricity markets designed for centralized power plants, and market control by established operators. As the Stern Review on the Economics of Climate Change points out:

"National grids are usually tailored towards the operation of centralised power plants and thus favour their performance. Technologies that do not easily fit into these networks may struggle to enter the market, even if the technology itself is commercially viable. This applies to distributed generation as most grids are not suited to receive electricity from many small sources. Large-scale renewables may also encounter problems if they are sited in areas far from existing grids."

- Lack of government policy support, which includes the lack of policies and regulations supporting deployment of renewable energy technologies and the presence of policies and regulations hindering renewable energy development and supporting conventional energy development. Examples include subsidies for fossil-fuels, insufficient consumer-based renewable energy incentives, government underwriting for nuclear plant accidents, and complex zoning and permitting processes for renewable energy.
- Lack of information dissemination and consumer awareness.
- Higher capital cost of renewable energy technologies compared with conventional energy technologies.
- Inadequate financing options for renewable energy projects, including insufficient access to affordable financing for project developers, entrepreneurs and consumers.
- Imperfect capital markets, which includes failure to internalize all costs of conventional energy (e.g., effects of air pollution, risk of supply disruption) and failure to internalize all benefits of renewable energy (e.g., cleaner air, energy security).
- Inadequate workforce skills and training, which includes lack of adequate scientific, technical, and manufacturing skills required for renewable energy production; lack of reliable installation, maintenance, and inspection services; and failure of the educational system to provide adequate training in new technologies.
- Lack of adequate codes, standards, utility interconnection, and net-metering guidelines.
- Poor public perception of renewable energy system aesthetics.
- Lack of stakeholder/community participation and co-operation in energy choices and renewable energy projects.

With such a wide range of non-technical barriers, there is no "silver bullet" solution to drive the transition to renewable energy. So ideally there is a need for several different types of policy instruments to complement each other and overcome different types of barriers.

A policy framework must be created that will level the playing field and redress the imbalance of traditional approaches associated with fossil fuels. The policy landscape must keep pace with broad trends within the energy sector, as well as reflecting specific social, economic and environmental priorities. Some resource-rich countries struggle to move away from fossil fuels and have failed thus far to adopt regulatory frameworks necessary for developing renewable energy (e.g. Russia).

== Public policy landscape ==
Though the share of electricity generation from renewables has increased since 2010, there is substantial variance among major world regions.

Public policy has a role to play in renewable energy commercialization because the free market system has some fundamental limitations. As the Stern Review points out: "In a liberalised energy market, investors, operators and consumers should face the full cost of their decisions. But this is not the case in many economies or energy sectors. Many policies distort the market in favour of existing fossil fuel technologies." The International Solar Energy Society has stated that "historical incentives for the conventional energy resources continue even today to bias markets by burying many of the real societal costs of their use".

Fossil-fuel energy systems have different production, transmission, and end-use costs and characteristics than do renewable energy systems, and new promotional policies are needed to ensure that renewable systems develop as quickly and broadly as is socially desirable. Lester Brown states that the market "does not incorporate the indirect costs of providing goods or services into prices, it does not value nature's services adequately, and it does not respect the sustainable-yield thresholds of natural systems". It also favors the near term over the long term, thereby showing limited concern for future generations. Tax and subsidy shifting can help overcome these problems, though is also problematic to combine different international normative regimes regulating this issue.

=== Shifting taxes ===
Tax shifting has been widely discussed and endorsed by economists. It involves lowering income taxes while raising levies on environmentally destructive activities, in order to create a more responsive market. For example, a tax on coal that included the increased health care costs associated with breathing polluted air, the costs of acid rain damage, and the costs of climate disruption would encourage investment in renewable technologies. Several Western European countries are already shifting taxes in a process known there as environmental tax reform.

In 2001, Sweden launched a new 10-year environmental tax shift designed to convert 30 billion kroner ($3.9 billion) of income taxes to taxes on environmentally destructive activities. Other European countries with significant tax reform efforts are France, Italy, Norway, Spain, and the United Kingdom. Asia's two leading economies, Japan and China, are considering carbon taxes.

=== Shifting subsidies ===
Just as there is a need for tax shifting, there is also a need for subsidy shifting. Subsidies are not an inherently bad thing as many technologies and industries emerged through government subsidy schemes. The Stern Review explains that of 20 key innovations from the past 30 years, only one of the 14 was funded entirely by the private sector and nine were totally publicly funded. In terms of specific examples, the Internet was the result of publicly funded links among computers in government laboratories and research institutes. And the combination of the federal tax deduction and a robust state tax deduction in California helped to create the modern wind power industry. At the same time specifically US tax credits systems for renewable energy have been described as an "opaque" financial instrument dominated by large investors to reduce their tax payments while greenhouse gas reduction targets are being treated as a side effect.

Lester Brown has argued that "a world facing the prospect of economically disruptive climate change can no longer justify subsidies to expand the burning of coal and oil. Shifting these subsidies to the development of climate-benign energy sources such as wind, solar, biomass, and geothermal power is the key to stabilizing the earth's climate." The International Solar Energy Society advocates "leveling the playing field" by redressing the continuing inequities in public subsidies of energy technologies and R&D, in which the fossil fuel and nuclear power receive the largest share of financial support.

Some countries are eliminating or reducing climate-disrupting subsidies and Belgium, France, and Japan have phased out all subsidies for coal. Germany is reducing its coal subsidy. The subsidy dropped from $5.4 billion in 1989 to $2.8 billion in 2002, and in the process Germany lowered its coal use by 46 percent. China cut its coal subsidy from $750 million in 1993 to $240 million in 1995 and more recently has imposed a high-sulfur coal tax. However, the United States has been increasing its support for the fossil fuel and nuclear industries.

In November 2011, an IEA report entitled Deploying Renewables 2011 said "subsidies in green energy technologies that were not yet competitive are justified in order to give an incentive to investing into technologies with clear environmental and energy security benefits". The IEA's report disagreed with claims that renewable energy technologies are only viable through costly subsidies and not able to produce energy reliably to meet demand.

A fair and efficient imposition of subsidies for renewable energies and aiming at sustainable development, however, require coordination and regulation at a global level, as subsidies granted in one country can easily disrupt industries and policies of others, thus underlining the relevance of this issue at the World Trade Organization.

=== Renewable energy targets ===
Setting national renewable energy targets can be an important part of a renewable energy policy and these targets are usually defined as a percentage of the primary energy and/or electricity generation mix. For example, the European Union has prescribed an indicative renewable energy target of 12 percent of the total EU energy mix and 22 percent of electricity consumption by 2010. National targets for individual EU Member States have also been set to meet the overall target. Other developed countries with defined national or regional targets include Australia, Canada, Israel, Japan, Korea, New Zealand, Norway, Singapore, Switzerland, and some US States.

National targets are also an important component of renewable energy strategies in some developing countries. Developing countries with renewable energy targets include China, India, Indonesia, Malaysia, the Philippines, Thailand, Brazil, Egypt, Mali, and South Africa. The targets set by many developing countries are quite modest when compared with those in some industrialized countries.

Renewable energy targets in most countries are indicative and nonbinding but they have assisted government actions and regulatory frameworks. The United Nations Environment Program has suggested that making renewable energy targets legally binding could be an important policy tool to achieve higher renewable energy market penetration.

=== Levelling the playing field ===
The IEA has identified three actions which will allow renewable energy and other clean energy technologies to "more effectively compete for private sector capital".

- "First, energy prices must appropriately reflect the "true cost" of energy (e.g. through carbon pricing) so that the positive and negative impacts of energy production and consumption are fully taken into account". Example: New UK nuclear plants cost £92.50/MWh, whereas offshore wind farms in the UK are supported with €74.2/MWh at a price of £150 in 2011 falling to £130 per MWh in 2022. In Denmark, the price can be €84/MWh.
- "Second, inefficient fossil fuel subsidies must be removed, while ensuring that all citizens have access to affordable energy".
- "Third, governments must develop policy frameworks that encourage private sector investment in lower-carbon energy options".

=== Green stimulus programs ===
In response to the Great Recession, major governments made "green stimulus" programs one of their main policy instruments for supporting economic recovery. Some US$188 billion in green stimulus funding had been allocated to renewable energy and energy efficiency, to be spent mainly in 2010 and in 2011.

=== Energy sector regulation ===
Public policy determines the extent to which renewable energy (RE) is to be incorporated into a developed or developing country's generation mix. Energy sector regulators implement that policy—thus affecting the pace and pattern of RE investments and connections to the grid. Energy regulators often have authority to carry out a number of functions that have implications for the financial feasibility of renewable energy projects. Such functions include issuing licenses, setting performance standards, monitoring the performance of regulated firms, determining the price level and structure of tariffs, establishing uniform systems of accounts, arbitrating stakeholder disputes (like interconnection cost allocations), performing management audits, developing agency human resources (expertise), reporting sector and commission activities to government authorities, and coordinating decisions with other government agencies. Thus, regulators make a wide range of decisions that affect the financial outcomes associated with RE investments.

In addition, the sector regulator is in a position to give advice to the government regarding the full implications of focusing on climate change or energy security. The energy sector regulator is the natural advocate for efficiency and cost-containment throughout the process of designing and implementing RE policies. Since policies are not self-implementing, energy sector regulators become a key facilitator (or blocker) of renewable energy investments.

=== Energy transition in Germany ===
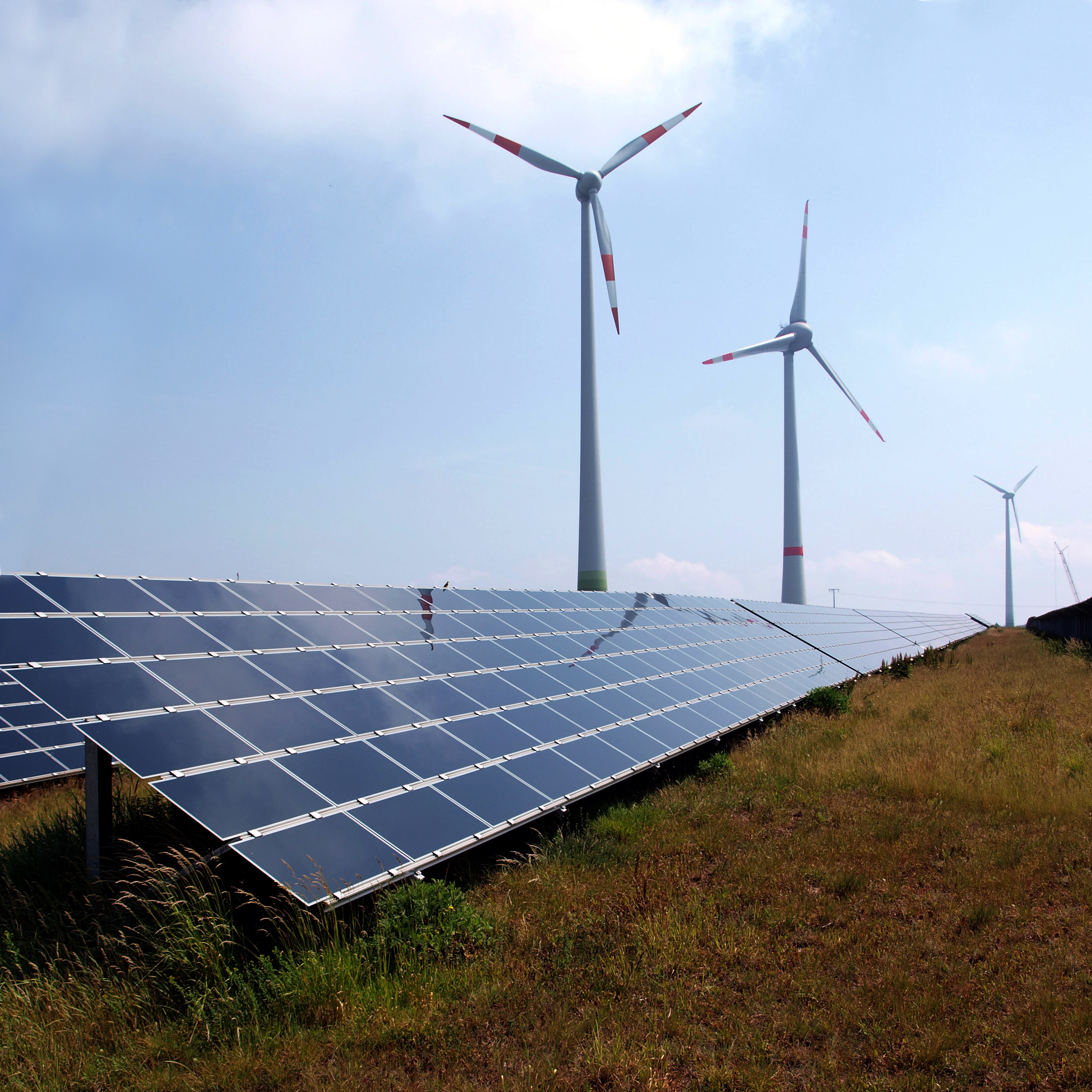
Photovoltaic array and wind turbines at the Schneebergerhof wind farm in the German state of Rheinland-Pfalz

Gross generation of electricity by source in Germany 1990–2020

The Energiewende (German for energy transition) is the transition by Germany to a low carbon, environmentally sound, reliable, and affordable energy supply. The new system will rely heavily on renewable energy (particularly wind, photovoltaics, and biomass) energy efficiency, and energy demand management. Most if not all existing coal-fired generation will need to be retired. The phase-out of Germany's fleet of nuclear reactors, to be complete by 2022, is a key part of the program.

Legislative support for the Energiewende was passed in late 2010 and includes greenhouse gas (GHG) reductions of 80–95% by 2050 (relative to 1990) and a renewable energy target of 60% by 2050. These targets are ambitious. The Berlin-based policy institute Agora Energiewende noted that "while the German approach is not unique worldwide, the speed and scope of the Energiewende are exceptional". The Energiewende also seeks a greater transparency in relation to national energy policy formation.

Germany has made significant progress on its GHG emissions reduction target, achieving a 27% decrease between 1990 and 2014. However Germany will need to maintain an average GHG emissions abatement rate of 3.5% per annum to reach its Energiewende goal, equal to the maximum historical value thus far.

Germany spends €1.5 billion per annum on energy research (2013 figure) in an effort to solve the technical and social issues raised by the transition. This includes a number of computer studies that have confirmed the feasibility and a similar cost (relative to business-as-usual and given that carbon is adequately priced) of the Energiewende.

These initiatives go well beyond European Union legislation and the national policies of other European states. The policy objectives have been embraced by the German federal government and has resulted in a huge expansion of renewables, particularly wind power. Germany's share of renewables has increased from around 5% in 1999 to 22.9% in 2012, surpassing the OECD average of 18% usage of renewables.

Producers have been guaranteed a fixed feed-in tariff for 20 years, guaranteeing a fixed income. Energy co-operatives have been created, and efforts were made to decentralize control and profits. The large energy companies have a disproportionately small share of the renewables market. However, in some cases poor investment designs have caused bankruptcies and low returns, and unrealistic promises have been shown to be far from reality. Nuclear power plants were closed, and the existing nine plants will close earlier than planned, in 2022.

One factor that has inhibited efficient employment of new renewable energy has been the lack of an accompanying investment in power infrastructure to bring the power to market. It is believed 8,300 km of power lines must be built or upgraded. The different German States have varying attitudes to the construction of new power lines. Industry has had their rates frozen and so the increased costs of the Energiewende have been passed on to consumers, who have had rising electricity bills.

== Voluntary market mechanisms for renewable electricity ==
Voluntary markets, also referred to as green power markets, are driven by consumer preference. Voluntary markets allow a consumer to choose to do more than policy decisions require and reduce the environmental impact of their electricity use. Voluntary green power products must offer a significant benefit and value to buyers to be successful. Benefits may include zero or reduced greenhouse gas emissions, other pollution reductions or other environmental improvements on power stations.

The driving factors behind voluntary green electricity within the EU are the liberalized electricity markets and the RES Directive. According to the directive, the EU Member States must ensure that the origin of electricity produced from renewables can be guaranteed and therefore a "guarantee of origin" must be issued (article 15). Environmental organisations are using the voluntary market to create new renewables and improving sustainability of the existing power production. In the US the main tool to track and stimulate voluntary actions is Green-e program managed by Center for Resource Solutions. Globally available voluntary tool used by the NGOs to promote sustainable electricity production is EKOenergy label.

== Recent developments ==
A number of events in 2006 pushed renewable energy up the political agenda, including the US mid-term elections in November, which confirmed clean energy as a mainstream issue. Also in 2006, the Stern Review made a strong economic case for investing in low carbon technologies now, and argued that economic growth need not be incompatible with cutting energy consumption. According to a trend analysis from the United Nations Environment Programme, climate change concerns coupled with recent high oil prices and increasing government support are driving increasing rates of investment in the renewable energy and energy efficiency industries.

Investment capital flowing into renewable energy reached a record US$77 billion in 2007, with the upward trend continuing in 2008. The OECD still dominates, but there is now increasing activity from companies in China, India and Brazil. Chinese companies were the second largest recipient of venture capital in 2006 after the United States. In the same year, India was the largest net buyer of companies abroad, mainly in the more established European markets.

New government spending, regulation, and policies helped the industry weather the 2009 economic crisis better than many other sectors. Most notably, U.S. President Barack Obama's American Recovery and Reinvestment Act of 2009 included more than $70 billion in direct spending and tax credits for clean energy and associated transportation programs. This policy-stimulus combination represents the largest federal commitment in U.S. history for renewables, advanced transportation, and energy conservation initiatives. Based on these new rules, many more utilities strengthened their clean-energy programs. Clean Edge suggests that the commercialization of clean energy will help countries around the world deal with the current economic malaise. Once-promising solar energy company, Solyndra, became involved in a political controversy involving U.S. President Barack Obama's administration's authorization of a $535 million loan guarantee to the Corporation in 2009 as part of a program to promote alternative energy growth. The company ceased all business activity, filed for Chapter 11 bankruptcy, and laid-off nearly all of its employees in early September 2011.

In his 24 January 2012, State of the Union address, President Barack Obama restated his commitment to renewable energy. Obama said that he "will not walk away from the promise of clean energy." Obama called for a commitment by the Defense Department to purchase 1,000 MW of renewable energy. He also mentioned the long-standing Interior Department commitment to permit 10,000 MW of renewable energy projects on public land in 2012.

As of 2012, renewable energy plays a major role in the energy mix of many countries globally. Renewables are becoming increasingly economic in both developing and developed countries. Prices for renewable energy technologies, primarily wind power and solar power, continued to drop, making renewables competitive with conventional energy sources. Without a level playing field, however, high market penetration of renewables is still dependent on robust promotional policies. Fossil fuel subsidies, which are far higher than those for renewable energy, remain in place and quickly need to be phased out.

United Nations' Secretary-General Ban Ki-moon has said that "renewable energy has the ability to lift the poorest nations to new levels of prosperity". In October 2011, he "announced the creation of a high-level group to drum up support for energy access, energy efficiency and greater use of renewable energy. The group is to be co-chaired by Kandeh Yumkella, the chair of UN Energy and director general of the UN Industrial Development Organisation, and Charles Holliday, chairman of Bank of America".

Worldwide use of solar power and wind power continued to grow significantly in 2012. Solar electricity consumption increased by 58 percent, to 93 terawatt-hours (TWh). Use of wind power in 2012 increased by 18.1 percent, to 521.3 TWh. Global solar and wind energy installed capacities continued to expand even though new investments in these technologies declined during 2012. Worldwide investment in solar power in 2012 was $140.4 billion, an 11 percent decline from 2011, and wind power investment was down 10.1 percent, to $80.3 billion. But due to lower production costs for both technologies, total installed capacities grew sharply. This investment decline, but growth in installed capacity, may again occur in 2013. Analysts expect the market to triple by 2030. In 2015, investment in renewables exceeded fossils.

== 100% renewable energy ==
The incentive to use 100% renewable energy for electricity, transport, or even total primary energy supply globally has been motivated by global warming and other ecological as well as economic concerns. In the Intergovernmental Panel on Climate Change's reviews of scenarios of energy usage that would keep global warming to approximately 1.5 degrees, the proportion of primary energy supplied by renewables increases from 15% in 2020 to 60% in 2050 (median values across all published pathways). The proportion of primary energy supplied by biomass increases from 10% to 27%, with effective controls on whether land use is changed in the growing of biomass. The proportion from wind and solar increases from 1.8% to 21%.

At the national level, at least 30 nations around the world already have renewable energy contributing more than 20% of energy supply.

Mark Z. Jacobson, professor of civil and environmental engineering at Stanford University and director of its Atmosphere and Energy Program, says producing all new energy with wind power, solar power, and hydropower by 2030 is feasible and existing energy supply arrangements could be replaced by 2050. Barriers to implementing the renewable energy plan are seen to be "primarily social and political, not technological or economic". Jacobson says that energy costs with a wind, solar, water system should be similar to today's energy costs.

Renewable projects must be sited at distant locations due to high land prices in urban areas or for the renewable resource itself which require transmission construction costs.

Similarly, in the United States, the independent National Research Council has noted that "sufficient domestic renewable resources exist to allow renewable electricity to play a significant role in future electricity generation and thus help confront issues related to climate change, energy security, and the escalation of energy costs … Renewable energy is an attractive option because renewable resources available in the United States, taken collectively, can supply significantly greater amounts of electricity than the total current or projected domestic demand."

The most significant barriers to the widespread implementation of large-scale renewable energy and low carbon energy strategies are primarily political and not technological. According to the 2013 Post Carbon Pathways report, which reviewed many international studies, the key roadblocks are: climate change denial, the fossil fuels lobby, political inaction, unsustainable energy consumption, outdated energy infrastructure, and financial constraints.

== Energy efficiency ==
Moving towards energy sustainability will require changes not only in the way energy is supplied, but in the way it is used, and reducing the amount of energy required to deliver various goods or services is essential. Opportunities for improvement on the demand side of the energy equation are as rich and diverse as those on the supply side, and often offer significant economic benefits.

A sustainable energy economy requires commitments to both renewables and efficiency. Renewable energy and energy efficiency are said to be the "twin pillars" of sustainable energy policy. The American Council for an Energy-Efficient Economy has explained that both resources must be developed in order to stabilize and reduce carbon dioxide emissions:

Efficiency is essential to slowing the energy demand growth so that rising clean energy supplies can make deep cuts in fossil fuel use. If energy use grows too fast, renewable energy development will chase a receding target. Likewise, unless clean energy supplies come online rapidly, slowing demand growth will only begin to reduce total emissions; reducing the carbon content of energy sources is also needed.

The IEA has stated that renewable energy and energy efficiency policies are complementary tools for the development of a sustainable energy future, and should be developed together instead of being developed in isolation.

== See also ==
=== Lists ===
- Lists about renewable energy
- List of countries by renewable electricity production
- List of energy storage projects
- List of large wind farms
- List of notable renewable energy organizations
- List of renewable energy topics by country

=== Topics ===
- Environmental skepticism – Skepticism of environmentalism
- Catching the Sun (film)
- Clean Energy Trends – Energy development
- Cost of electricity by source – Comparison of costs of different electricity generation sources
- Ecotax – Compulsory fee intended to discourage environmentally harmful acts
- EKOenergy – International ecolabel for renewable energy
- Energy security and renewable technology – Renewable technologies contributions to energy security
- Environmental tariff – Tariff to equalise externality costs
- Feed-in Tariff – Policy mechanism
- International Renewable Energy Agency – International organization
- PV financial incentives – Incentives offered to electricity consumers
- Rocky Mountain Institute – Global clean energy non-profit organization
- The Clean Tech Revolution – Book by Ron Pernick
- The Third Industrial Revolution – Book by Jeremy Rifkin
- World Council for Renewable Energy

=== People ===
- Andrew Blakers – Australian academic
- Richard L. Crowther – American architect known for solar-energy and futurist design
- James Dehlsen
- Mark Diesendorf – Australian academic and environmentalist
- Rolf Disch – German architect (born 1944)
- David Faiman – British and Israeli physicist (born 1944)
- Hans-Josef Fell – German politician (born 1952)
- Harrison Fraker – American architecture and urban design professor
- Chris Goodall – English businessman, author and expert on new energy technologies
- Al Gore – Vice President of the United States from 1993 to 2001
- Michael Grätzel – Swiss professor (born 1944)
- Martin Green – Australian engineer and professor
- Jan Hamrin
- Denis Hayes – American environmentalist
- Tetsunari Iida – Japanese energy activist
- Mark Z. Jacobson – American climatologist and engineer (born 1965)
- Stefan Krauter – German professor
- Jeremy Leggett – British social entrepreneur and writer (born 1954)
- Richard Levine – American architect
- Amory Lovins – American energy policy analyst
- Gaspar Makale – Tanzanian engineer
- Eric Martinot – American researcher on global renewable energy policy and markets
- David Mills
- Huang Ming
- Leonard L. Northrup Jr. – American businessman
- Arthur Nozik – American chemist
- Monica Oliphant – British-Australian academic and physicist
- Stanford R. Ovshinsky – American engineer, scientist and inventor
- Luis Palmer – Swiss teacher, innovator, and environmentalist
- Alan Pears
- Hélène Pelosse – French official
- Ron Pernick – American author and managing director
- Phil Radford – American consumer and conservation leader (born 1976)
- Jeremy Rifkin – American economic and social theorist (born 1945)
- Hermann Scheer – German politician
- Zhengrong Shi – Chinese-Australian businessman and philanthropist
- Benjamin K. Sovacool – American academic
- Thomas H. Stoner, Jr. – American entrepreneur and writer
- Peter Taylor – British environmentalist (born 1948)
- Félix Trombe – French engineer
- John Twidell
- Martin Vosseler – Swiss renewable energy advocate (1948–2019)
- Stuart Wenham
- Clint Wilder – American business journalist
- John I. Yellott – American scientist (1908–1986)
- Elon Musk – Industrialist and technologist (born 1971)

== Bibliography ==
- Aitken, Donald W. (2010). Transitioning to a Renewable Energy Future, International Solar Energy Society, January, 54 pages.
- Armstrong, Robert C.; Wolfram, Catherine; Gross, Robert; Lewis, Nathan S.; Ramana, M. V. (11 January 2016). "The Frontiers of Energy". Nature Energy. 1. Archived from the original on 23 February 2025.
- EurObserv'ER (2012). The state of renewable energies in Europe, 250 pages.
- HM Treasury (2006). Stern Review on the Economics of Climate Change, 575 pages.
- IPCC, 2018: Global Warming of 1.5°C. An IPCC Special Report on the impacts of global warming of 1.5°C above pre-industrial levels and related global greenhouse gas emission pathways, in the context of strengthening the global response to the threat of climate change, sustainable development, and efforts to eradicate poverty [V. Masson-Delmotte, P. Zhai, H. O. Pörtner, D. Roberts, J. Skea, P.R. Shukla, A. Pirani, W. Moufouma-Okia, C. Péan, R. Pidcock, S. Connors, J. B. R. Matthews, Y. Chen, X. Zhou, M. I. Gomis, E. Lonnoy, T. Maycock, M. Tignor, T. Waterfield (eds.)].
  - Report website, chapters I–V
  - Summary for policymakers, 32 pp.
  - Headline statements, 2 pp.
  - Technical summary, 22 pp.
  - FAQ, 24 pp.
  - Glossary, 24 pp.
- International Council for Science (c2006). Discussion Paper by the Scientific and Technological Community for the 14th session of the United Nations Commission on Sustainable Development, 17 pages.
- International Energy Agency (2006). World Energy Outlook 2006: Summary and Conclusions, OECD, 11 pages.
- International Energy Agency (2007). Renewables in global energy supply: An IEA facts sheet, OECD, 34 pages.
- International Energy Agency (2008). Deploying Renewables: Principles for Effective Policies, OECD, 8 pages.
- International Energy Agency (2011). Deploying Renewables 2011: Best and Future Policy Practice, OECD.
- International Energy Agency (2011). Solar Energy Perspectives, OECD.
- Lovins, Amory B. (2011). Reinventing Fire: Bold Business Solutions for the New Energy Era, Chelsea Green Publishing, 334 pages.
- Makower, Joel, and Ron Pernick and Clint Wilder (2009). Clean Energy Trends 2009, Clean Edge.
- National Renewable Energy Laboratory (2006). Non-technical Barriers to Solar Energy Use: Review of Recent Literature, Technical Report, NREL/TP-520-40116, September, 30 pages.
- Pernick, Ron and Wilder, Clint (2012). Clean Tech Nation: How the U.S. Can Lead in the New Global Economy, HarperCollins.
- Renewables Global Status Report: 2009 Update (PDF). Paris: REN21 Secretariat. 2009. Archived (PDF) from the original on 10 July 2021.
- Renewables 2010 Global Status Report (PDF). Paris: REN21 Secretariat. 2010. Archived (PDF) from the original on 10 July 2021.
- Renewables 2011 Global Status Report (PDF). Paris: REN21 Secretariat. 2011. Archived (PDF) from the original on 10 July 2021.
- Renewables 2012 Global Status Report (PDF). Paris: REN21 Secretariat. 2012. Archived (PDF) from the original on 10 July 2021.
- Renewables 2013 Global Status Report (PDF). Paris: REN21 Secretariat. 2013. ISBN 978-3-9815934-0-2. Archived (PDF) from the original on 10 July 2021.
- Renewables 2014 Global Status Report (PDF). Paris: REN21 Secretariat. 2014. ISBN 978-3-9815934-2-6. Archived (PDF) from the original on 10 July 2021.
- Renewables 2015 Global Status Report (PDF). Paris: REN21 Secretariat. 2015. ISBN 978-3-9815934-6-4. Archived (PDF) from the original on 10 July 2021.
- Renewables 2016 Global Status Report (PDF). Paris: REN21 Secretariat. 2016. ISBN 978-3-9818107-0-7. Archived (PDF) from the original on 9 December 2020.
- Renewables 2017 Global Status Report (PDF). Paris: REN21 Secretariat. 2017. ISBN 978-3-9818107-6-9. Archived from the original (PDF) on 10 July 2021.
- Renewables 2018 Global Status Report (PDF). Paris: REN21 Secretariat. 2018. ISBN 978-3-9818911-3-3. Archived from the original (PDF) on 8 June 2021.
- Renewables 2019 Global Status Report (PDF). Paris: REN21 Secretariat. 2019. ISBN 978-3-9818911-7-1. Archived from the original (PDF) on 18 June 2021.
- Renewables 2020 Global Status Report (PDF). Paris: REN21 Secretariat. 2020. ISBN 978-3-948393-00-7. Archived (PDF) from the original on 23 September 2020.
- Renewables 2021 Global Status Report (PDF). Paris: REN21 Secretariat. 2021. ISBN 978-3-948393-03-8. Archived (PDF) from the original on 15 June 2021.
