= David Mills =

David Mills may refer to:

- David Mills (author) (born 1959), American author
- David Mills (bass) (1926–2020), Canadian singer, poet. composer, actor
- David Mills (Canadian politician) (1831–1903), Canadian Supreme Court judge
- David Mills (Welsh politician) (active 2026)
- David Mills (comedian) (active 2011), London-based American comedy actor and cabaret artist
- David Mills (cricketer) (1937–2013), English cricketer
- David Mills (editor) (born 1957), American editor and writer
- David Mills (footballer) (born 1951), English footballer and scout
- David Mills (solicitor) (born 1944), British lawyer
- David Mills (rugby league) (born 1981), English rugby league footballer
- David Mills (solar researcher) (born 1946), Australian scientist
- David Mills (TV writer) (1961–2010), American journalist and TV writer
- David L. Mills (1938–2024), American academic computer engineer
- David P. Mills (active 2017), British chemist
- Detective David Mills, character in the 1995 film Seven
- Dave Mills (singer) (1935–2014), South African singer
- Dave Mills (sprinter) (born 1939), American sprinter, 1962 All-American for the Purdue Boilermakers track and field team
- Gyp Mills (David John Mills, 1946–2019), sculptor and songwriter

== See also ==
- David Millns (born 1965), English cricket umpire and former cricketer
