= Energy subsidies in the United States =

Government aid to reduce fuel costs

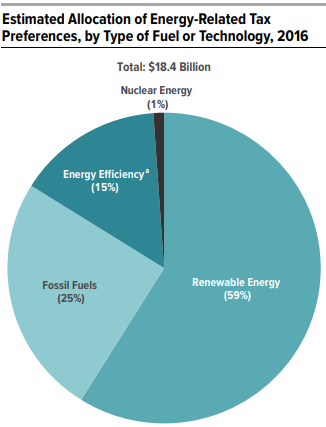
Congressional Budget Office estimated allocation of energy-related tax preferences, by type of fuel or technology, 2016

Energy subsidies are government payments that keep the price of energy lower than market rate for consumers or higher than market rate for producers. These subsidies are part of the energy policy of the United States.

According to Congressional Budget Office testimony in 2016, an estimated $10.9 billion in tax preferences was directed toward renewable energy, $4.6 billion went to fossil fuels, and $2.7 billion went to energy efficiency or electricity transmission.

According to a 2015 estimate by the Obama administration, the US oil industry benefited from subsidies of about $4.6 billion per year. A 2017 study by researchers at Stockholm Environment Institute published in the journal Nature Energy estimated that "tax preferences and other subsidies push nearly half of new, yet-to-be-developed oil investments into profitability, potentially increasing US oil production by 17 billion barrels over the next few decades."

== Overview of energy subsidies ==
Energy subsidies are measures that keep prices for customers below market levels, or for suppliers above market levels, or reduce costs for customers and suppliers. Energy subsidies may be direct cash transfers to suppliers, customers, or related bodies, as well as indirect support mechanisms, such as tax exemptions and rebates, price controls, trade restrictions, and limits on market access.

During FY 2016–22, most US federal subsidies were for renewable energy producers (primarily biofuels, wind, and solar), low-income households, and energy-efficiency improvements. During FY 2016–22, nearly half (46%) of federal energy subsidies were associated with renewable energy, and 35% were associated with energy end uses. Federal support for renewable energy of all types more than doubled, from $7.4 billion in FY 2016 to $15.6 billion in FY 2022.

The International Renewable Energy Agency tracked some $634 billion in energy-sector subsidies in 2020, and found that around 70% were fossil fuel subsidies. About 20% went to renewable power generation, 6% to biofuels and just over 3% to nuclear.

== Biofuel subsidies ==
In the United States, biofuel subsidies have been justified on the following grounds: energy independence, reduction in greenhouse gas emissions, improvements in rural development related to biofuel plants and farm income support. Several economists from Iowa State University found "there is no evidence to disprove that the primary objective of biofuel policy is to support farm income."

== Consumer subsidies ==
Consumers who purchase hybrid vehicles are eligible for a tax credit that depends upon the type of vehicle and the difference in fuel economy in comparison to vehicles of similar weights. These credits range from several hundred dollars to a few thousand dollars. Homeowners can receive a tax credit up to $500 for energy-efficient products like insulation, windows, doors, as well as heating and cooling equipment. Homeowners who install solar electric systems can receive a 30% tax credit and homeowners who install small wind systems can receive a tax credit up to $4000. Geothermal heat pumps also qualify for tax credits up to $2,000.

== Other subsidies ==
Recent energy policy incentives have provided, among other things, billions of dollars in tax reductions for nuclear power, fossil fuel production, clean coal technologies, renewable electricity production, and conservation and efficiency improvements.

== Allocation of subsidies in the United States ==
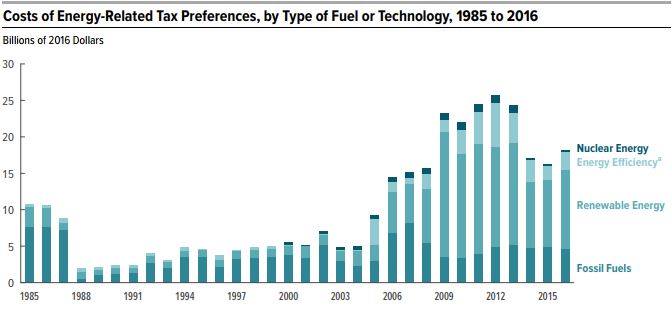
Congressional Budget Office testimony delivered March 29, 2017 showing the historic trend of energy related tax preferences

A 2017 study by the consulting firm Management Information Services, Inc. (MISI) estimated the total historical federal subsidies for various energy sources over the years 1950–2016. The study found that oil, natural gas, and coal received $414 billion, $140 billion, and $112 billion (2015 dollars), respectively, or 65% of total energy subsidies over that period. Oil, natural gas, and coal benefited most from percentage depletion allowances and other tax-based subsidies, but oil also benefited heavily from regulatory subsidies such as exemptions from price controls and higher-than-average rates of return allowed on oil pipelines. The MISI report found that non-hydro renewable energy (primarily wind and solar) benefited from $158 billion in federal subsidies, or 16% of the total, largely in the form of tax policy and direct federal expenditures on research and development (R&D). Nuclear power benefited from $73 billion in federal subsidies, 8% of the total and less than half of the total applied to renewables, while hydro power received $105 billion in federal subsidies, 10% of the total. Notable was MISI's finding that between 2011 through 2016, renewable energy received more than three times as much help in federal incentives as oil, natural gas, coal, and nuclear combined, and 27 times as much as nuclear energy.

In the United States, the federal government has paid US$145 billion for energy subsidies to support R&D for nuclear power ($85 billion) and fossil fuels ($60 billion) from 1950 to 2016. During this same timeframe, renewable energy technologies received a total of US $34 billion. Though in 2007 some suggested that a subsidy shift would help to level the playing field and support growing energy sectors, namely solar power, wind power, and bio-fuels., by 2017 those sources combined had yet to provide 10% of U.S. electricity, and intermittency forced utilities to remain reliant on oil, natural gas, and coal to meet baseload demand. Many of the "subsidies" available to the oil and gas industries are general business opportunity credits, available to all US businesses (particularly, the foreign tax credit mentioned above). The value of industry-specific (oil, gas, and coal) subsidies in 2006 was estimated by the Texas State Comptroller to be $6.25 billion - about 60% of the amount calculated by the Environmental Law Institute. The balance of federal subsidies, which the comptroller valued at $7.4 billion, came from shared credits and deductions, and oil defense (spending on the Strategic Petroleum Reserve, energy infrastructure security, etc.).

Critics allege that the most important subsidies to the nuclear industry have not involved cash payments, but rather the shifting of construction costs and operating risks from investors to taxpayers and ratepayers, burdening them with an array of risks including cost overruns, defaults to accidents, and nuclear waste management. Critics claim that this approach distorts market choices, which they believe would otherwise favor less risky energy investments.

Many energy analysts, such as Clint Wilder, Ron Pernick and Lester Brown, have suggested that energy subsidies need to be shifted away from mature and established industries and towards high growth clean energy (excluding nuclear). They also suggest that such subsidies need to be reliable, long-term and consistent, to avoid the periodic difficulties that the wind industry has had in the United States.

== United States government role in the development of new energy industries ==
From civilian nuclear power to hydro, wind, solar, and shale gas, the United States federal government has played a central role in the development of new energy industries.

America's nuclear power industry, which currently supplies about 20% of the country's electricity, has its origins in the Manhattan Project to develop atomic weapons during World War II. From 1942 to 1945, the United States invested $20 billion (2003 dollars) into a massive nuclear research and deployment initiative. But the achievement of the first nuclear weapon test in 1945 marked the beginning, not the end, of federal involvement in nuclear technologies. President Dwight D. Eisenhower's “Atoms for Peace” address in 1953 and the 1954 Atomic Energy Act committed the United States to develop peaceful uses for nuclear technology, including commercial energy generation.

Commercial wind power was also enabled through government support. In the 1980s, the federal government pursued two different R&D efforts for wind turbine development. The first was a “big science” effort by NASA and the Department of Energy (DOE) to use U.S. expertise in high-technology research and products to develop new large-scale wind turbines for electricity generation, largely from scratch. A second, more successful R&D effort, sponsored by the DOE, focused on component innovations for smaller turbines that used the operational experience of existing turbines to inform future research agendas. Joint research projects between the government and private firms produced a number of innovations that helped increase the efficiency of wind turbines, including twisted blades and special-purpose airfoils. Publicly funded R&D was coupled with efforts to build a domestic market for new turbines. At the federal level, this included tax credits and the passage of the Public Utilities Regulatory Policy Act (PURPA), which required that utilities purchase power from some small renewable energy generators at avoided cost. Both federal and state support for wind turbine development helped drive costs down considerably, but policy incentives at both the federal and state level were discontinued at the end of the decade. However, after a nearly five-year federal policy hiatus in the late 1980s, the U.S. government enacted new policies to support the industry in the early 1990s. The National Renewable Energy Laboratory (NREL) continued its support for wind turbine R&D, and also launched the Advanced Wind Turbine Program (AWTP). The goal of the AWTP was to reduce the cost of wind power to rates that would be competitive in the U.S. market. Policymakers also introduced new mechanisms to spur the demand of new wind turbines and boost the domestic market, including a 1.5 cents per kilowatt-hour tax credit (adjusted over time for inflation) included in the 1992 Energy Policy Act. Today the wind industry's main subsidy support comes from the federal production tax credit.

The development of commercial solar power was also dependent on government support. Solar PV technology was developed in the United States, when Daryl Chapin, Calvin Fuller, and Gerald Pearson at Bell Labs first demonstrated the silicon solar photovoltaic cell in 1954. The first cells recorded efficiencies of four percent, far lower than the 25 percent efficiencies typical of some silicon crystalline cells today. With the cost out of reach for most applications, developers of the new technology had to look elsewhere for an early market. As it turned out, solar PV did make economic sense in one market segment: aerospace. The United States Army and Air Force viewed the technology as an ideal power source for a top-secret project on earth-orbiting satellites. The government contracted with Hoffman Electronics to provide solar cells for its new space exploration program. The first commercial satellite, the Vanguard I, launched in 1958, was equipped with both silicon solar cells and chemical batteries. By 1965, NASA was using almost a million solar PV cells. Strong government demand and early research support for solar cells paid off in the form of dramatic declines in the cost of the technology and improvements in its performance. From 1956 to 1973, the price of PV cells declined from $300 to $20 per watt. Beginning in the 1970s, as costs were declining, manufacturers began producing solar PV cells for terrestrial applications. Solar PV found a new niche in areas distant from power lines where electricity was needed, such as oil rigs and Coast Guard lighthouses. The government continued to support the industry through the 1970s and early 1980s with new R&D efforts under Presidents Richard Nixon and Gerald Ford, both Republicans, and President Jimmy Carter, a Democrat. As a direct result of government involvement in solar PV development, 13 of the 14 top innovations in PV over the past three decades were developed with the help of federal dollars, nine of which were fully funded by the public sector.

More recently than nuclear, wind, or solar, the development of the shale gas industry and subsequent boom in shale gas development in the United States was enabled through government support. The history of shale gas fracking in the United States was punctuated by the successive developments of massive hydraulic fracturing (MHF), microseismic imaging, horizontal drilling, and other key innovations that when combined made the once unreachable energy resource technically recoverable. Along each stage of the innovation pipeline – from basic research to applied R&D to cost-sharing on demonstration projects to tax policy support for deployment – public-private partnerships and federal investments helped push hydraulic fracturing in shale into full commercial competitiveness. Through a combination of federally funded geologic research beginning in the 1970s, public-private collaboration on demonstration project and R&D priorities, and tax policy support for unconventional technologies, the federal government played a key role in the development of shale gas in the United States.

Investigations have uncovered the crucial role of the government in the development of other energy technologies and industries, including aviation and jet engines, synthetic fuels, advanced natural gas turbines, and advanced diesel internal combustion engines.
