= Solar Energy Perspectives =

2011 book by the International Energy Agency

- Author: Cédric Philibert
- Publisher: Organisation for Economic Co-operation and Development/International Energy Agency
- Publication date: 2011
- Pages: 228 pp.
- ISBN: 9264124578
- OCLC: 767906899

Solar Energy Perspectives is a 2011 book by the International Energy Agency.

Solar energy technologies come in various forms – solar heating, solar photovoltaics, solar thermal electricity – and can make contributions to solving some of the problems the world faces:

The development of affordable, inexhaustible and clean solar energy technologies will have huge longer-term benefits. It will increase countries’ energy security through reliance on an indigenous, inexhaustible and mostly import-independent resource, enhance sustainability, reduce pollution, lower the costs of mitigating climate change, and keep fossil fuel prices lower than otherwise. These advantages are global. Hence the additional costs of the incentives for early deployment should be considered learning investments; they must be wisely spent and need to be widely shared.

Solar Energy Perspectives builds upon past analyses of solar energy deployment contained in the World Energy Outlook, Energy Technology Perspectives and several IEA Technology Roadmaps. It aims at "offering an updated picture of current technology trends and markets, as well as new analyses on how solar energy technologies for electricity, heat and fuels can be used in the various energy consuming sectors, now and in the future".

== Review ==
The International Energy Agency’s 2011 report Solar Energy Perspectives examined solar technologies, market trends and the role of solar power in the future global energy system.

== See also ==
- Deploying Renewables 2011
- The Third Industrial Revolution
- The Clean Tech Revolution
- List of books about renewable energy
- Mark Z. Jacobson
