= Deploying Renewables 2011 =

Book by Internationaal Energieagentschap

- Author: International Energy Agency
- Publisher: OECD/IEA
- Publication date: 24 November 2011
- Pages: 180 pp.
- ISBN: 9789264124905
- OCLC: 768130724

Deploying Renewables 2011: Best and Future Policy Practice is a 2011 book by the International Energy Agency. The book analyses the recent successes in renewable energy, which now accounts for almost a fifth of all electricity produced worldwide, and addresses how countries can best capitalize on that growth to realise a sustainable energy future. The book says that renewable energy commercialization must be stepped up, especially given the world’s increasing appetite for energy and the need to meet this demand more efficiently and with low-carbon energy sources. Wind power and other renewable energy sources offer great potential to address issues of energy security and sustainability.

This analysis updates and expands Deploying Renewables: Principles for Effective Policies, published by the IEA in 2008, in light of events and trends in the last five years. It also "extends the analysis to a wider range of countries beyond the OECD and BRICS countries, focussing on 56 countries representative of each world region".

== Key findings ==
Renewable energy commercialisation has been rapid. Growth rates are in line with those required for a sustainable energy future:

• "The RE electricity sector, for example, has grown by 17.8% over the last five years (2005-09) and currently provides 19.3% of total power generation in the world."

• "Hydro power is still the major source of renewable electricity (83.8% of RE generation, corresponding to about 16% of total generation in 2009), and the absolute growth in hydro generation over the last five years has been equivalent to that of all the other RE electricity technologies, mainly because of developments in China. Hydro will continue to be an important technology for years to come and must not be excluded from policy considerations."

• "The other newer RE electricity technologies have also grown rapidly, by an impressive 73.6% between 2005 and 2009, a compound average growth rate (CAGR) of 14.8%. Wind has grown most rapidly in absolute terms and has overtaken bioenergy. Solar PV has grown at a growth rate of 50.2% (CAGR), and installed capacity reached about 40 GW by the end of 2010."

• "Progress in RE electricity penetration was focused in the OECD and in Brazil, India and China. The OECD was the only region where the deployment of less mature technologies (such as solar PV, offshore wind) reached a significant scale, with capacities in the order of GWs."

• "Renewable heat grew by 5.9% between 2005 and 2009. Although the use of biomass is still the dominant technology (and includes the use of “traditional” biomass with low efficiency for heating and cooking), growth in solar heating, and to a lesser extent geothermal heating technologies, has been strong, with an overall growth rate of nearly 12% between 2005 and 2009. Growth was particularly driven by rapid increases in solar heating in China."

• "The production and use of biofuels have been growing rapidly, and in 2009 they provided 53.7 Mtoe, equivalent to some 3% of road transport fuels (or 2% of all transport fuels). The biofuels sector has been growing very rapidly (26% CAGR in 2005-09). Biofuels production and consumption are still concentrated in Brazil, the United States and in the European Union. The main centres for ethanol production and consumption are the United States and Brazil, while Europe produces and consumes mainly biodiesel. The remaining markets in other regions and the rest of the world account for only 6% of total production and for 3.3% of consumption. Trade in biofuels plays a limited, yet increasingly important role."

== See also ==
- The Third Industrial Revolution
- The Clean Tech Revolution
- List of books about renewable energy
- Mark Z. Jacobson
