= Clean Energy Trends =

Energy development

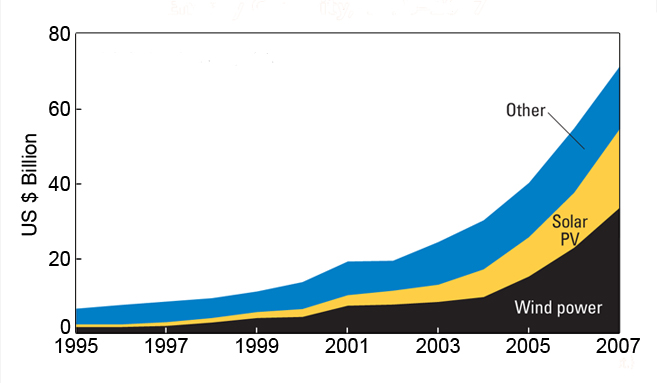
Global renewable energy investment growth (1995–2007)

Clean Energy Trends is a series of reports by Clean Edge which examine markets for solar, wind, geothermal, fuel cells, biofuels, and other clean energy technologies. Since the publication of the first Clean Energy Trends report in 2002, Clean Edge has provided an annual snapshot of both the global and U.S. clean energy sector markets.

== 2006 trends ==
In 2006 most climate change deniers began to change their views. Scientists, investors, business leaders, and politicians moved the agenda from whether climate change was occurring to what should be done about it. The acceptance of climate change as “real” helped to unlock latent interest in clean energy technologies on the part of corporate and political leaders. In Washington and other capitals, clean energy became a bipartisan issue. In corporate boardrooms, it is said to be fast becoming an imperative. And clean energy markets are growing:

"We have reached the point where the steady and rapid growth of clean energy has become an old story. Each year, it seems, brings an ever-higher plateau of success. This appears to be the future of clean energy: a rolling series of technology breakthroughs, landmark corporate investments, industry consolidation, and the not-infrequent emergence of new and sometimes surprising players entering the field."

== 2007 trends ==
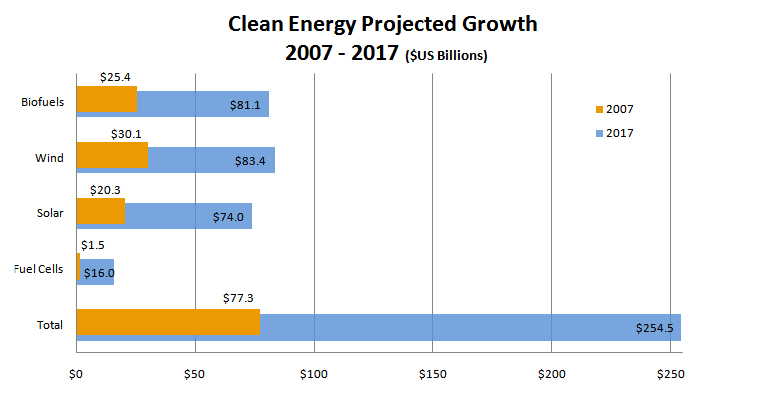
Projected renewable energy investment growth globally (2007–2017)

Clean Energy Trends 2007 shows markets for four benchmark technologies — solar photovoltaics, wind power, biofuels, and fuel cells — continuing their steady climb. Annual revenue for these four technologies increased nearly 39% in one year — to $55 billion in 2006 up from $40 billion in 2005. Clean Edge forecasts that this trajectory will continue to become a $226 billion market by 2016.

Several developments have helped to strengthen clean energy markets in 2007:

- "a near tripling in venture investments in energy technologies in the U.S. to more than $2.4 billion"
- "a new level of commitment by U.S. politicians at the regional, state, and federal levels"
- "significant corporate investments in clean energy acquisitions and expansion initiatives"

== See also ==
- List of energy storage projects
- Renewable energy industry
