= List of books about renewable energy =

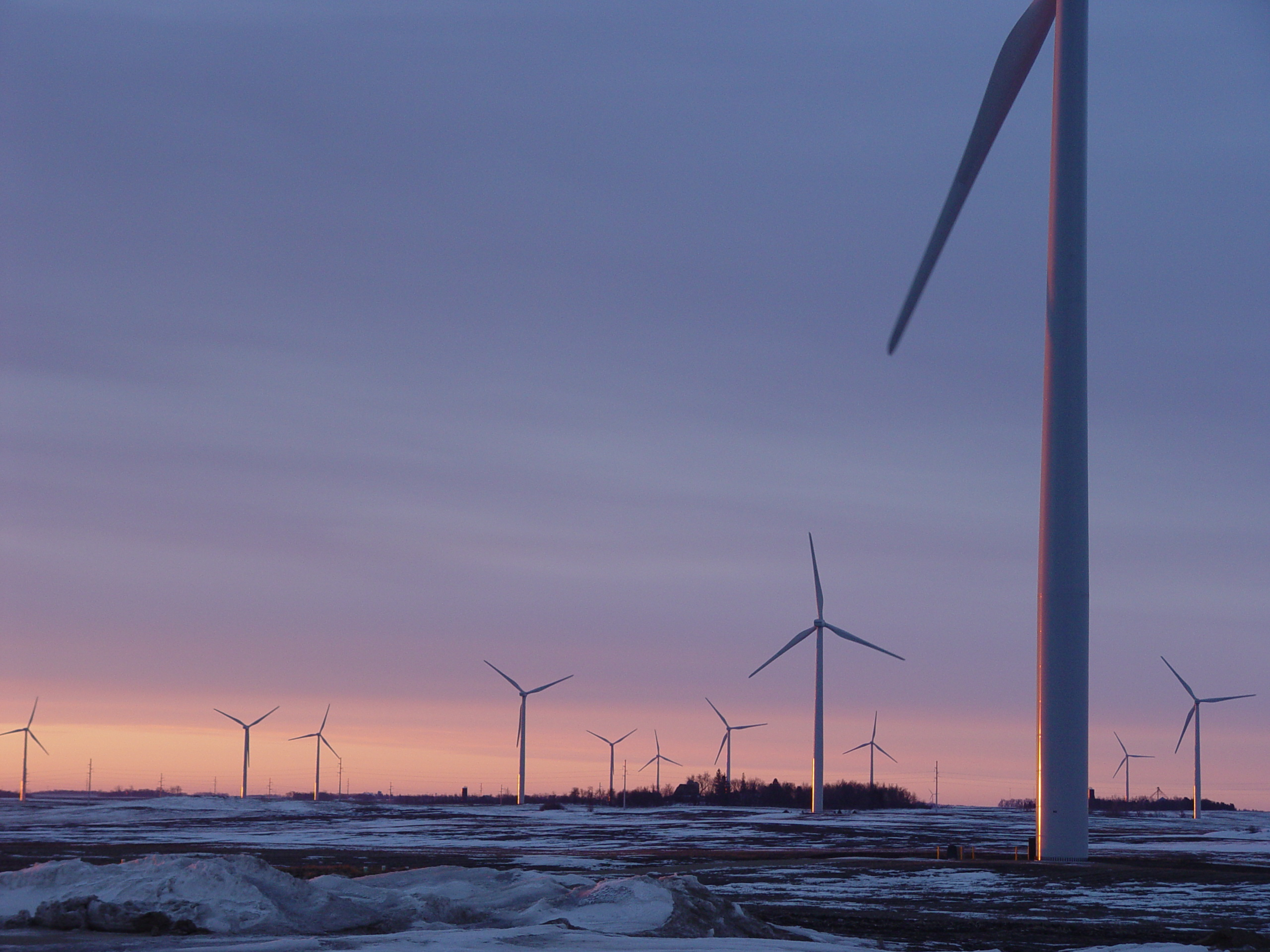
Wind farm

This is a bibliography of renewable energy.

Renewable energy is energy which comes from natural resources such as sunlight, wind, rain, tides, and geothermal heat, which are renewable (naturally replenished). About 16% of global final energy consumption comes from renewables, with 10% coming from traditional biomass, which is mainly used for heating, and 3.4% from hydroelectricity. New renewables (small hydro, modern biomass, wind, solar, geothermal, and biofuels) account for another 3% and are growing very rapidly.

Total investment in renewable energy reached $244 billion in 2012. The top countries for investment in recent years were China, Germany, Spain, the United States, Italy, and Brazil. Leading renewable energy companies include BrightSource Energy, Enercon, First Solar, Gamesa, GE Energy, Goldwind, Nordex, Sinovel, Suntech, Trina Solar, Vestas and Yingli.

== List ==
- Alternative Energy: Political, Economic, and Social Feasibility – 2006 book by Christopher A. Simon
- Clean Tech Nation: How the U.S. Can Lead in the New Global Economy – 2012 book by Ron Pernick and Clint Wilder
- The Clean Tech Revolution – Book by Ron Pernick
- Climate Change and Global Energy Security – 2011 book by Marilyn A. Brown
- Deploying Renewables 2011 – Book by Internationaal Energieagentschap
- Energy and American Society: Thirteen Myths – 2007 book edited by Benjamin K. Sovacool and Marilyn A. Brown
- Energy Autonomy: The Economic, Social & Technological Case for Renewable Energy – 2006 book by Hermann Scheer
- Energy for a Sustainable World – From the Oil Age to a Sun-Powered Future
- The Energy Imperative: 100 Percent Renewable Now – Exclusively using renewable resources for all energy
- Energy Victory: Winning the War on Terror by Breaking Free of Oil – 2007 book by Robert Zubrin
- The Fourth Revolution: Energy
- Green Illusions: The Dirty Secrets of Clean Energy and the Future of Environmentalism – 2012 book by Ozzie Zehner
- Greenhouse Solutions with Sustainable Energy – 2007 book by Mark Diesendorf
- Harnessing Solar Heat
- Kick The Fossil Fuel Habit – 2010 book by Tom Rand
- Non-Nuclear Futures: The Case for an Ethical Energy Strategy – Book by Amory Lovins
- Outlook On Renewable Energy In America – 2007 report on US renewable energy
- Powering Planet Earth – Energy Solutions for the Future
- Reinventing Fire: Bold Business Solutions for the New Energy Era (2011) by Amory Lovins
- Renewable Electricity and the Grid
- Renewable Energy: Challenges and Solutions (2024) by Peter Yang
- Renewable Energy Sources and Climate Change Mitigation (2011) by the IPCC
- Renewable Energy Systems: A Smart Energy Systems Approach to the Choice and Modeling of 100 % Renewable Solutions
- Renewable energy. Technology, economics and environment
- Small is Profitable: The Hidden Economic Benefits of Making Electrical Resources the Right Size
- Solar Electricity Handbook IPCC
- Solar Energy Perspectives (2011) by the International Energy Agency
- The Solar Generation (2018) by Philip R Wolfe
- Straight Up
- Surviving the Century: Facing Climate Chaos and Other Global Challenges
- Sustainable Energy - Without the Hot Air
- Ten Technologies to Fix Energy and Climate
- Understanding Renewable Energy Systems
- What Will Work: Fighting Climate Change with Renewable Energy, Not Nuclear Power

== See also ==
Academic journals

- Energy & Environment
- Energy Policy
- Journal of Renewable and Sustainable Energy
- List of renewable energy journals
- Renewable and Sustainable Energy Reviews
- Renewable Energy – Monthly peer-reviewed scientific journal
- Solar Energy

Other

- List of films about renewable energy
