= Martin Vosseler =

Swiss renewable energy advocate (1948–2019)

Martin Vosseler (October 4, 1948 – October 23, 2019) was a Swiss renewable energy advocate, co-founder of the organization Physicians for Social Responsibility, who has been a renewable energy advocate since 1981. After giving up his medical practice in 1995, he began working full-time to raise awareness of the benefits of renewable energy use, by traveling around the world. From 16 October 2006 to 8 May 2007, Vosseler and his crew made history by completing the first trans-Atlantic crossing in a motorized boat, using solar power only. Vosseler received a special prize from Eurosolar.

Vosseler died on 23 October 2019 after he was struck by a truck while bicycling in Basel. He was 71 years old.

On the 1. of August 2022, friends and fellows of Martin Vosseler founded the Martin Vosseler Association to initiate and support projects that contribute to keeping our planet inhabitable.
