= Ron Pernick =

American author and managing director

Ron Pernick is an American author who is the co-founder and managing director of Clean Edge, a developer and publisher of thematic stock indexes tracking clean energy, transportation, water, and the grid. He is a market research, publishing, and business development entrepreneur.

== Biography ==
Pernick has co-authored reports on emerging green technologies and has worked with multinational companies, government agencies, and investors. Pernick co-authored the first report to identify the business and financial opportunities of clean technology (Clean Tech: Profits & Potential, 2001) and has since helped to popularize the term and advance the sector. At Clean Edge, he had led the design and development of multiple clean-energy and sustainable-infrastructure focused stock indexes with Nasdaq including U.S.-listed clean energy (CELS) and global smart-grid and grid infrastructure (QGRD). He has also taught MBA-level courses at Portland State University and New College and spoken at industry events in the U.S. and abroad.

With Clint Wilder, Pernick is co-author of The Clean Tech Revolution (HarperCollins, 2007) and Clean Tech Nation: How the U.S. Can Lead in the New Global Economy (HarperCollins, 2012).

== See also ==
- Renewable energy commercialization
