= Clean Tech Nation =

2012 book by Ron Pernick and Clint Wilder

- First edition
- Author: Ron Pernick; Clint Wilder
- Subject: Environmental technology
- Publisher: HarperBusiness
- Publication date: 2012
- Pages: 308 pp.
- ISBN: 978-0-06-208844-4
- OCLC: 805672961

Clean Tech Nation: How the U.S. Can Lead in the New Global Economy is a 2012 book written by Ron Pernick and Clint Wilder. The book surveys the expansion of clean technology and renewable energy in the 2000s. Clean Tech Nation is the sequel to the 2007 book The Clean Tech Revolution.

== Review ==
A review on Eco Founder described Clean Tech Nation as an accessible and solutions-focused overview of the United States clean-technology sector and its policy challenges.

== See also ==
- List of books about renewable energy
- List of books about energy issues
- Renewable energy commercialization
- Renewable energy policy
- Sustainable business
