= Clean Edge =

Publisher of thematic stock indexes

Clean Edge, Inc.
- Company type: Private
- Industry: Cleantech
- Founded: 2000
- Headquarters: Portland, Oregon
- Key people: Ron Pernick, Co-Founder and Managing Director; Clint Wilder, Senior Editor
- Products: Thematic stock indexes tracking clean energy, transportation, water, and the grid
- Website: http://www.cleanedge.com/

Clean Edge, Inc., founded in 2000, is a U.S.-based developer and publisher of thematic stock indexes tracking clean energy, transportation, water, and the grid. The firm's first index, the Nasdaq Clean Edge Green Energy Index (CELS), was launched with Nasdaq in 2006. Financial products tracking the firm's indexes and universes exceed $2.5 billion in assets under management (as of December 15, 2020).

Clean Edge currently publishes multiple stock indexes with Nasdaq, including:

- CELS (U.S.-traded clean-energy companies);
- GWE (public companies engaged and involved in the global wind industry);
- HHO (U.S.-listed companies in the potable water and wastewater market); and
- QGRD (global smart grid and grid infrastructure firms).

Exchange traded funds based on the firm's indexes are offered by First Trust, Tachlit, and others.

Clean Edge is also known for its industry research, including the Clean Tech Leadership Index which tracked all 50 states and the 50-largest metro areas on dozens of clean-tech indicators; Clean Energy Trends which the firm published annually more than a decade; and custom reports for a range of government, non-profit, and corporate entities including the City of San Francisco, Portland Development Commission, Massachusetts Clean Energy Center, Energy Foundation, Green America, Gridwise Alliance, Rockefeller Family, Sharp, SolarCity, JETRO, and Wells Fargo. Recent reports include Clean Energy & Smart Grid Infrastructure and Water Infrastructure & Resiliency, published in partnership with Nasdaq.

Clean Edge analysts are regularly quoted in the media and the firm is based out of Portland, Oregon.

Clean Edge's Ron Pernick and Clint Wilder co-authored The Clean Tech Revolution: The Next Big Growth and Investment Opportunity (HarperCollins, June 2007), the first business book to make the economic and environmental case for clean technology, and Clean Tech Nation: How the U.S. Can Lead in the New Global Economy (HarperCollins, September 2012). Positive reviews came from U.S. President Bill Clinton, Reed Hundt, Hunter Lovins, former NRG Energy CEO David Crane, Guy Kawasaki, John Doerr and Nancy Pfund.

== See also ==
- List of companies based in Oregon
