= David Mills (comedian) =

London-based American actor, comedian and cabaret performer

David Mills is a London-based American actor, comedian and cabaret performer who won the Hackney Empire's New Act of the Year competition in 2011. He has regularly appeared as sidekick on fellow US comic Scott Capurro's live chat shows, as well as successful shows at the St. James Theatre, London and the Edinburgh Festival Fringe.

He appears with Meryl Streep in the 2016 film Florence Foster Jenkins as Augustus Corbin.
