= David Mills (solar researcher) =

David R. Mills (born 1946) is a researcher who has been active in solar energy research in Australia since 1975, working at the University of Sydney as a Principal Research Fellow till 2005.

Mills specializes in solar thermal electricity development, which he believes is one cornerstone of the future sustainable energy economy. His work is predominately in the field of solar spectrum selective materials and non-imaging optics. The prime focus of his research is planning 24-hour solar plants to eliminate coal use.

In 2002 Mills became chairman of Solar Heat and Power, an Australian company he co-founded with Professor Graham Morrison (UNSW) and Peter Le Lievre. Solar Heat and Power went on to develop innovative CLFR type line focus solar thermal power systems in Australia, Europe, and North America.

Mills is a former president of the International Solar Energy Society, and was the first Chair of the International Solar Cities Initiative.

He is currently chief scientific officer and co-founder at Ausra Inc.

== See also ==
- Ausra (company)
