= The Clean Tech Revolution =

Book by Ron Pernick

- Author: Ron Pernick; Clint Wilder
- Subject: Green technology Renewable energy sources Energy policy—Economic aspects Capital investments
- Publisher: Collins
- Publication date: June 2007
- Pages: 308 pp
- ISBN: 0-06-089623-X
- OCLC: 141246722
- Dewey Decimal: 333.794
- LC Class: TD145 .P46 2007

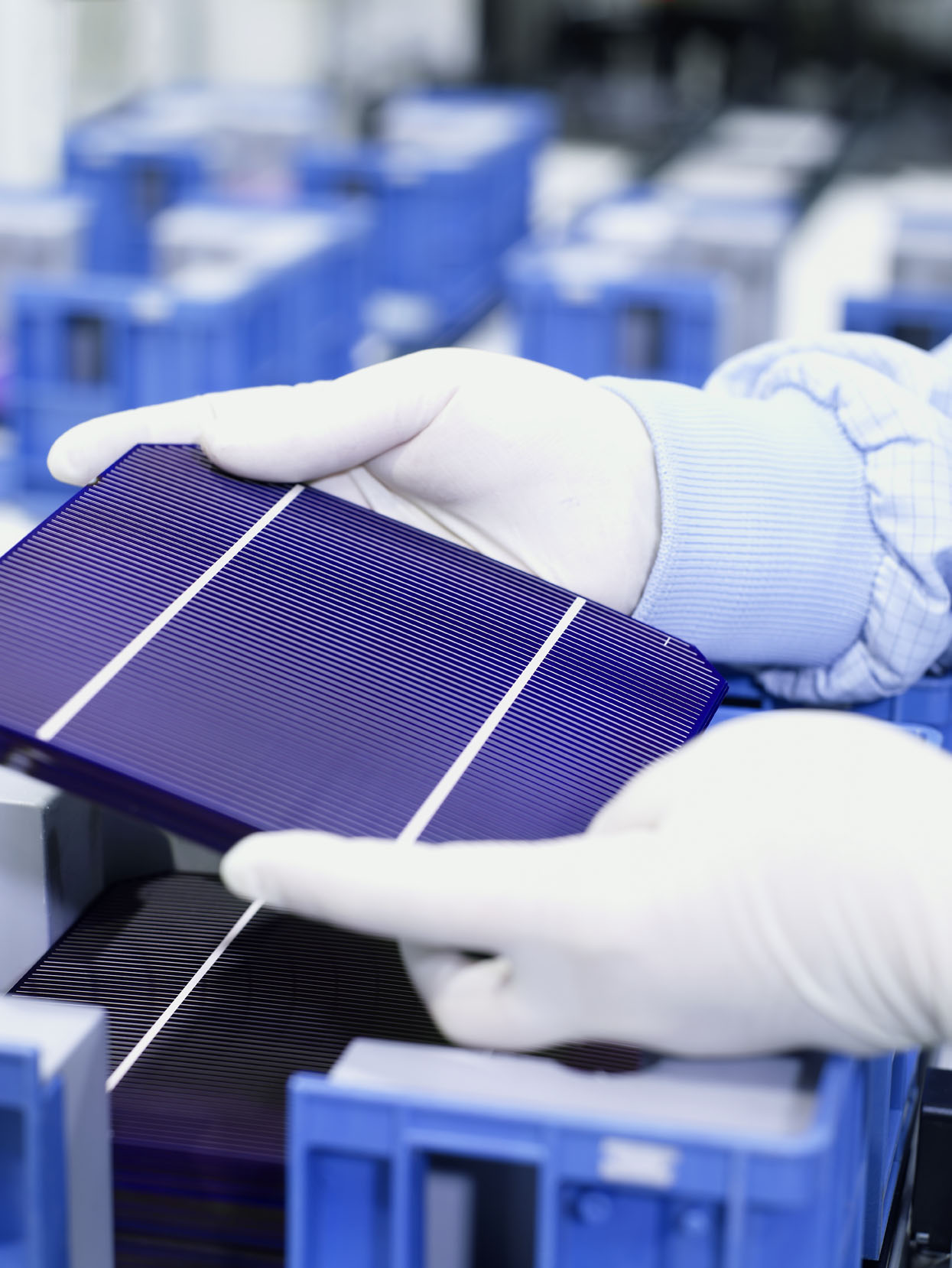
Monocrystalline solar cell

The Clean Tech Revolution: The Next Big Growth and Investment Opportunity is a 2007 book by Ron Pernick and Clint Wilder, who say that commercializing clean technologies is a profitable enterprise that is moving steadily into mainstream business. As the world economy faces challenges from energy price spikes, resource shortages, global environmental problems, and security threats, clean technologies are seen to be the next engine of economic growth.

Pernick and Wilder highlight eight major clean technology sectors: solar power, wind power, biofuels, green buildings, personal transportation, the smart grid, mobile applications, and water filtration. Six major forces, which they call the six C's, are pushing clean technology into the mainstream: costs, capital, competition, China, consumers, and climate. Very large corporations such as GE, Toyota and Sharp, and investment firms such as Goldman Sachs are making multibillion-dollar investments in clean technology.

The book has been reviewed in USA Today, Business Week, Energy Priorities, Sustainability Investment News and several other magazines, and has been translated into seven languages. Clean Tech Nation is the sequel to The Clean Tech Revolution.

== Themes ==
Pernick and Wilder explain that, in the 1970s, clean technology was considered "alternative", the province of back-to-the-land lifestyle advocates, altruistic environmentalists, and lab scientists on research grants. Such technology was in an early stage of development, was too expensive, did not have widespread political support, and very few large, established companies were embracing the sector. Even at the start of the 21st century, the term clean tech was not yet in the financial or business community's vocabulary. But now, throughout much of the world, in trends large and small, there is "the beginning of a revolution that is changing the places where we live and work, the products we manufacture and purchase, and the development plans of cities, regional governments, and nations around the globe."

Pernick and Wilder define "clean tech" as "any product, service, or process that delivers value using limited or zero non-renewable resources and/or creates significantly less waste than conventional offerings." They highlight eight major clean technology sectors: solar power, wind power, biofuels, green buildings, personal transportation, the smart grid, mobile applications (such as portable fuel cells), and water filtration. The authors explain how investors, entrepreneurs, and individuals can profit from technological innovation in these areas. Pernick and Wilder identify some specific clean technologies, companies, and regions that are leading the way.

The authors present a list of drivers for clean tech: "high energy prices, depleted natural resources, volatile sources of foreign oil, record deficits, and unprecedented environmental and security challenges".

Pernick and Wilder present examples which show that the "clean tech revolution" is already underway. Very large corporations such as GE, Toyota and Sharp, and investment firms such as Goldman Sachs are making multibillion-dollar investments in clean technology.

The authors claim that nuclear power and clean coal are not clean technologies. Apart from the risks associated with nuclear power, "multibillion-dollar nuclear plants are simply not cost-effective when compared with other energy sources." The authors also believe that clean coal is an oxymoron for a myriad of reasons, including the sheer number of coal mine-related deaths and the fact that coal-fired plants, even some cleaner ones, are major contributors to serious illnesses such as asthma, heart disease, and mercury poisoning.

== Six C's ==
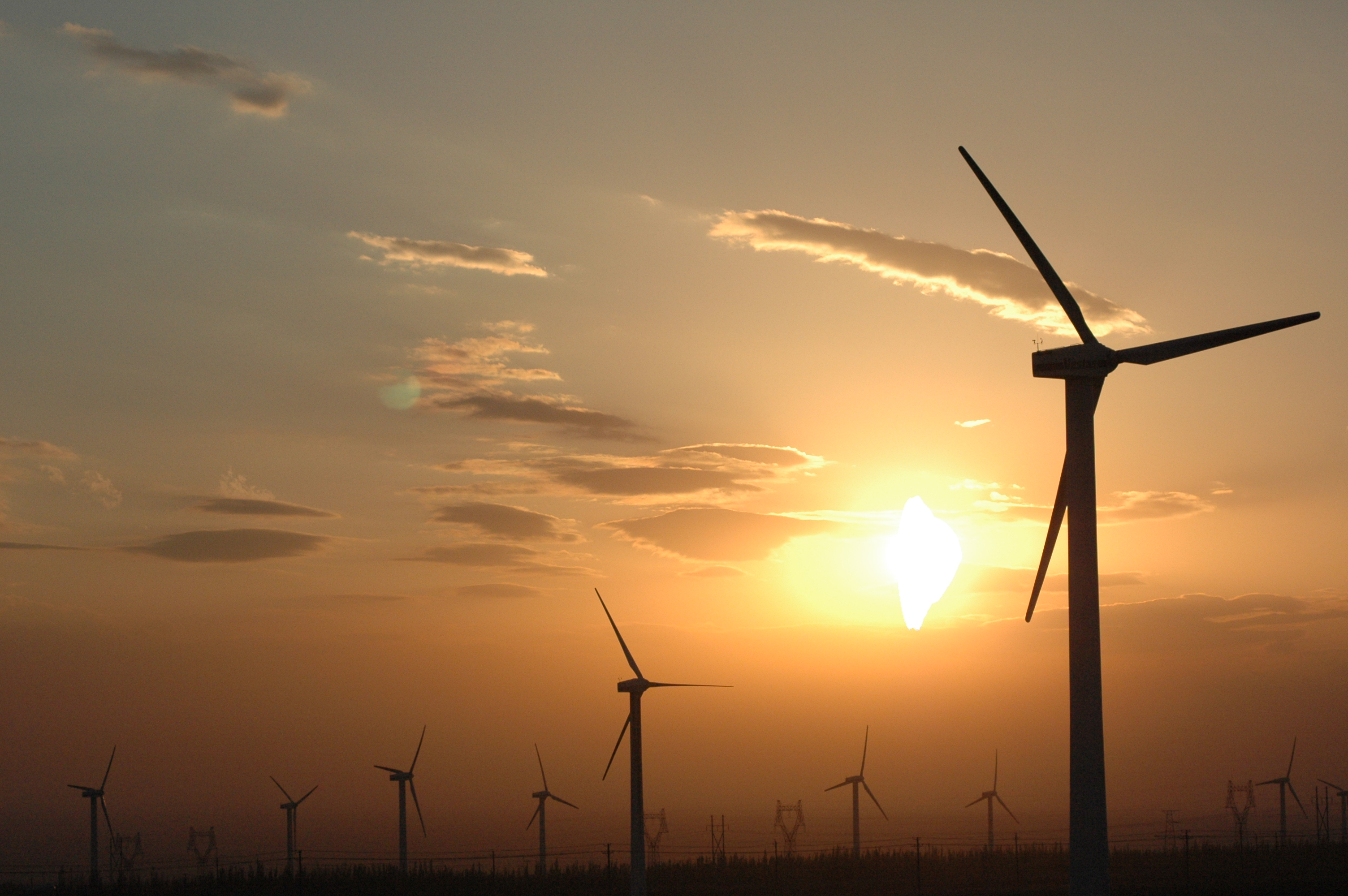
Wind farm in Xinjiang, China

Pernick and Wilder identify six major forces, which they call the six C's, that are pushing clean technology into the mainstream and driving rapid growth and expansion: costs, capital, competition, China, consumers, and climate.

- Costs. "Perhaps the most powerful force driving today's clean-tech growth is simple economics. As a general trend, clean-energy costs are falling as the costs of fossil fuel energy are going up. The future of clean tech is going to be, in many ways, about scaling up manufacturing and driving down costs."
- Capital. "An unprecedented influx of capital is changing the clean tech landscape, with billions of dollars, euros, yen, and yuan pouring in from a myriad of public and private sector sources."
- Competition. "Governments are competing aggressively in the high-stakes race to dominate in the clean-tech sector and build the jobs of the future."
- China. "Clean tech is being driven by the inexorable demands being placed on the earth not only by mature economies but also by the explosive demand for resources in China, India, and other developing nations. Their expanding energy needs are driving major growth in clean-energy, transportation, building, and water-delivery technologies."
- Consumers. "Savvy consumers are demanding cleaner products and services that use resources efficiently, reduce costs, and embrace quality over quantity."
- Climate. "The debate around climate change has gone from question mark to peer-reviewed certainty, and smart businesses are taking heed."

== Release and reception ==
The Clean Tech Revolution was published by Collins as a 320-page hardcover book on June 12, 2007. An e-book version was published by HarperCollins on June 7, 2007. In 2008, a revised paperback edition was published, with a new sub-title: Discover the Top Trends, Technologies and Companies to Watch. The book has been translated into seven languages.

Paul Gruber from the Erb Institute states that The Clean Tech Revolution is logically organized and is "an excellent resource for those who would like a solid understanding of clean tech and the potential of each sector".

The physicist and environmentalist, Joseph Romm, has recommended The Clean Tech Revolution to people who are looking for one book to help them understand what is happening in clean technology. He says The Clean Tech Revolution is the only book that covers the whole gamut of the latest in clean energy.

Russ Juskalian from USA Today says The Clean Tech Revolution shows the green movement not in "heartstring terms" but as economically profitable. The real power players are the mainstream consumers, investors, entrepreneurs, governments and multinational corporations whose "eyes are trained on that most crucial of economic fundamentals: the bottom line".

According to Reena Jana from Business Week, The Clean Tech Revolution is a "readable, straightforward guide to earth-friendly business strategies". The authors explain how businesses can follow the lead of companies such as Toyota by designing, selling, or funding inventive eco-friendly products and services. Jana says that the Toyota Prius is just one well-known example of successful clean technology in action.

Denis Du Bois, editor of Energy Priorities magazine, commented on the realistic and comprehensive coverage of the book. However, he suggests that The Clean Tech Revolution is not an explanation of the technologies and how they work, nor is it an analysis of energy or environmental policy. Policy is complicated and the authors avoid discussing it in detail. Little discussion ties the various clean technologies together and a "single-minded American focus" dominates. There is very little on the influence of mass transit and urban planning in Europe and other progressive regions. The chapter on water focuses on filtration, which is already an area of considerable opportunity, affecting even "green" industries, such as photovoltaics manufacturing.

Francesca Rheannon in Sustainability Investment News says that the book does not ask the most challenging question of all: is "clean growth" an oxymoron? She says that at a time when some experts say carbon emissions will need to be cut by 80 to 90% by 2050, the world may have to accept steady or even decreasing energy production, no matter how clean it is. Rheannon also states that there is little coverage of social issues. For example, nowhere is there mention of how water supply privatization and delivery by multinational corporations could affect the poor people of the world.

The Clean Tech Revolution was followed by the 2012 book Clean Tech Nation: How the U.S. Can Lead in the New Global Economy.

== Authors ==
Author Ron Pernick is co-founder and managing director of Clean Edge, a research and strategy firm in the United States which focuses on the commercialization of renewable energy and other clean technologies. Clint Wilder is senior editor at Clean Edge, and a veteran business and technology journalist. Both authors have been mapping clean technology trends for many years, and identifying business opportunities for prospective investors.

== See also ==
- List of books about renewable energy
- List of books about energy issues
- Renewable energy commercialization
- Renewable energy policy
- Sustainable business
- Kick The Fossil Fuel Habit
