= Clint Wilder =

American business journalist

Clint Wilder is an American business journalist who has covered the high-tech and clean-tech industries since 1985.

== Biography ==
Clint Wilder is senior editor at Clean Edge, a clean-tech research and strategy firm in the San Francisco Bay Area and Portland, Oregon, where he coauthors reports and writes columns on industry trends and has been a facilitator at the Clinton Global Initiative. He is a frequent speaker at clean-energy and green business events in the U.S. and overseas, and a regular blogger for the Huffington Post. In 2002, Mr. Wilder won the American Society of Business Publications Editors award for best feature series. He is also co-author of The Clean Tech Revolution: The Next Big Growth and Investment Opportunity, published in June 2007, which has been translated into seven languages.

Wilder published Clean Tech Nation: How the U.S. Can Lead in the New Global Economy (HarperCollins, September 2012).

== See also ==
- Ron Pernick
