= List of books about the energy industry =

This is a list of books about the energy industry:

| Title | Author(s) | Year |
|---|---|---|
| Alternative Energy: Political, Economic, and Social Feasibility | Christopher A. Simon | 2006 |
| Beyond Oil and Gas: The Methanol Economy | George A. Olah; Alain Goeppert; G. K. Surya Prakash | 2006 |
| Big Coal: The Dirty Secret Behind America's Energy Future | Jeff Goodell | 2006 |
| Brittle Power: Energy Strategy for National Security | Amory Lovins; L. Hunter Lovins | 1982 |
| Canada's Deadly Secret: Saskatchewan Uranium and the Global Nuclear System | Jim Harding | 2007 |
| Carbon Shift: How Peak Oil and the Climate Crisis Will Change Canada (and Our Lives) | Thomas Homer-Dixon, Nick Garrison (editors) | 2009 |
| The Carbon War: Global Warming and the End of the Oil Era | Jeremy Leggett | 1999 |
| The Clean Tech Revolution: The Next Big Growth and Investment Opportunity | Ron Pernick and Clint Wilder | 2007 |
| Contesting the Future of Nuclear Power | Benjamin K. Sovacool | 2011 |
| Deploying Renewables 2011 | International Energy Agency | 2011 |
| The End of Oil: On the Edge of a Perilous New World | Paul Roberts | 2004 |
| Energy and American Society: Thirteen Myths | Benjamin K. Sovacool and Marilyn A. Brown (editors) | 2007 |
| Energy Autonomy: The Economic, Social & Technological Case for Renewable Energy | Hermann Scheer | 2007 |
| Energy Technology Perspectives | International Energy Agency | biennial |
| Energy Victory: Winning the War on Terror by Breaking Free of Oil | Robert Zubrin | 2007 |
| Green Illusions: The Dirty Secrets of Clean Energy and the Future of Environmentalism | Ozzie Zehner | 2012 |
| Greenhouse Solutions with Sustainable Energy | Mark Diesendorf | 2007 |
| Gusher of Lies: The Dangerous Delusions of Energy Independence | Robert Bryce | 2008 |
| Half Gone: Oil, Gas, Hot Air and the Global Energy Crisis | Jeremy Leggett | 2005 |
| The History of the Standard Oil Company | Ida M. Tarbell | 1904 |
| Hot, Flat, and Crowded: Why We Need a Green Revolution--And How It Can Renew America | Thomas L. Friedman | 2008 |
| The Hype about Hydrogen: Fact and Fiction in the Race to Save the Climate | Joseph J. Romm | 2004 |
| Licensed to Kill? The Nuclear Regulatory Commission and the Shoreham Power Plant | Joan Aron | 1998 |
| Life in 2050 | Ulrich Eberl | 2011 |
| The Long Emergency: Surviving the Converging Catastrophes of the Twenty-first Century | James Howard Kunstler | 2005 |
| The Moral Case for Fossil Fuels | Alex Epstein | 2014 |
| Nuclear Implosions: The Rise and Fall of the Washington Public Power Supply System | Daniel Pope | 2008 |
| Nuclear Nebraska: The Remarkable Story of the Little County That Couldn't Be Bought | Susan Cragin | 2007 |
| Nuclear or Not? Does Nuclear Power Have a Place in a Sustainable Energy Future? | David Elliott | 2007 |
| Out of Gas: The End of the Age of Oil | David Goodstein | 2004 |
| Outlook On Renewable Energy In America | American Council on Renewable Energy | 2007 |
| The Party's Over: Oil, War, and the Fate of Industrial Societies | Richard Heinberg | 2003 |
| Plows, Plagues and Petroleum: How Humans Took Control of Climate | William Ruddiman | 2005 |
| Power Down: Options and Actions for a Post-Carbon World | Richard Heinberg | 2004 |
| Power Hungry: The Myths of "Green" Energy and the Real Fuels of the Future | Robert Bryce | 2010 |
| Reaction Time: Climate Change and the Nuclear Option | Ian Lowe | 2007 |
| Reinventing Fire: Bold Business Solutions for the New Energy Era | Amory Lovins | 2011 |
| Renewable Electricity and the Grid: The Challenge of Variability | Godfrey Boyle | 2007 |
| Renewable Energy: Challenges and Solutions | Peter Yang | 2024 |
| Renewable Energy Sources and Climate Change Mitigation | United Nations Intergovernmental Panel on Climate Change | 2010 |
| Small Is Profitable: The Hidden Economic Benefits of Making Electrical Resources the Right Size | Amory Lovins | 2002 |
| Sustainable Energy – Without the Hot Air | David J. C. MacKay | 2008 |
| Primer on Energy Economics and Policy: Electricity, Petroleum and Institutional Realities | Geoffrey Aori Mabea | 2026 |
| Ten Technologies to Save the Planet | Chris Goodall | 2008 |
| Untapped: The Scramble for Africa's Oil | John Ghazvinian | 2007 |
| Whole Earth Discipline | Stewart Brand | 2009 |
| Winning the Oil Endgame | Amory Lovins | 2005 |
| Alternative Energy Resources: The Way to a Substainable Modern Society | Pankaj Pathak and Rajiv Ranjanv Srivastava (editors) | 2021 |
| Alternative Energies: Updates on Progress | Germán Ferreira (editor) | 2013 |
| Energy: Crises, Challenges and Solutions | Pardeep Singh, Suruchi Singh, Gaurav Kumar, and Pooja Baweja (editors) | 2021 |
| Fossil Capital: The Rise of Steam Power and the Roots of Global Warming | Andreas Malm | 2016 |
| Energy Systems: A Very Short Introduction | Nick Jenkins | 2019 |
| Energy and Civilization: A History | Vaclav Smil | 2017 |
| Southeast Asian Energy Transitions | Mattijs Smits | 2015 |

== See also ==
- Benjamin K. Sovacool's bibliography
- Energy Matters
- Environmental Justice
- List of books about coal mining
- List of books about nuclear issues
- List of books about renewable energy
- List of books by Amory Lovins
- List of energy topics
- List of environmental books
- List of films about nuclear issues
- List of films about renewable energy
- Peak oil § Books
