= List of climate change books =

This is a list of climate change books that describe, as a major theme, the effects of human activity on climate change.

== Non-fiction ==
Non-fiction is an account or representation of a subject that is presented as fact. This presentation may be accurate or not; that is, it can give either a true or a false account of the subject in question. However, it is generally assumed that the authors of such accounts believe them to be truthful at the time of their composition.

Title	Theme(s) and subtheme(s)	Author(s)	Year(s)	ISBN(s)
Climate Change 2023: Synthesis Report	Climate science, mitigation and impacts	Intergovernmental Panel on Climate Change	2024	ISBN 978-92-9169-164-7
What We Can't Burn: Friendship and Friction in the Fight for Our Energy Future	Climate change the energy transition climate activism	Eve Driver Tom Osborn	2024	ISBN 978-1-958510-03-2
I’m A Climate Optimist: An Easy Guide to Lead a Sustainable Life	Climate Change	Aakash Ranison	2023	ISBN 978-0143460428 (IN)
An Appeal to Reason: A Cool Look at Global Warming	Global warming: skepticism about impact	Nigel Lawson	2008	ISBN 978-0-7156-3786-9 (UK); ISBN 978-1-59020-084-1 (US)
Atlas of Our Changing Environment	Climate change	United Nations Environment Programme	2005–	
The Carbon Age: How Life's Core Element Has Become Civilization's Greatest Threat	Climate change	Eric Roston	2008	ISBN 978-0-80271751-1
The Carbon War: Global Warming and the End of the Oil Era	Global warming	Jeremy Leggett	1999	
This Changes Everything	Climate change: the impact of capitalism	Naomi Klein	2014	ISBN 978-1-45169738-4
The Chilling Stars	Climate change: cosmic rays as major contributor	Henrik Svensmark and Nigel Calder	2003; 2007 (updated)	ISBN 1-84046-815-7
The Climate Book	Causes, effects and possible solutions to the climate crisis	Greta Thunberg and many others	2022	ISBN 978-0-241-54747-2
Climate Capitalism: Capitalism in the Age of Climate Change	Climate change: efficient energy use and renewable energy	Hunter Lovins and Boyd Cohen	2011	ISBN 978-0-8090-3473-4
Climate Change and Global Energy Security: Technology and Policy Options	Climate change mitigation and global energy security	Marilyn A. Brown and Benjamin K. Sovacool	2011	ISBN 978-0-262-01625-4
Climate Change Denial: Heads in the Sand	Climate change denial	Haydn Washington and John Cook; foreword by Naomi Oreskes	2011	ISBN 978-1-84971-336-8
Climate Code Red: The Case for Emergency Action	Global warming: "sustainability emergency"	David Spratt and Philip Sutton	2008	ISBN 1-921372-20-6
Cool It: The Skeptical Environmentalist's Guide to Global Warming	Global warming: high cost and low impact of countermeasures	Bjørn Lomborg	2007	ISBN 978-0-307-26692-7
The Deniers: The world-renowned scientists who stood up against global warming hysteria, political persecution, and fraud	Global warming: denial by reputable scientists	Lawrence Solomon	2008	ISBN 978-0-9800763-1-8
The Dirty Energy Dilemma: What’s Blocking Clean Power in the United States	Energy: four challenges and four solutions	Benjamin K. Sovacool	2008	
The Discovery of Global Warming	Global warming: history of scientific discoveries	Spencer R. Weart	2003	
Drawdown: The Most Comprehensive Plan Ever Proposed to Reverse Global Warming	Reference, scholarly work, list of solutions with estimated impact and costs	Paul Hawken	2017	ISBN 978-0-143-13044-4
Eaarth: Making a Life on a Tough New Planet	Climate change: statistics and causes	Bill McKibben	2010	ISBN 978-0-8050-9056-7
The End of Energy Obesity: Breaking Today's Energy Addiction for a Prosperous and Secure Tomorrow	Energy: oil prices, economic growth, environmental law, renewable energy, and global recession	Peter Tertzakian	2009	
The End of Nature	Global warming: human manipulation of natural forces	Bill McKibben	1989	ISBN 0-8129-7608-8
Energy and American Society: Thirteen Myths	Energy: counter-arguments to 13 propositions about US culture and the environment	Benjamin K. Sovacool and Marilyn A. Brown (editors)	2007	
Energy Autonomy: The Economic, Social & Technological Case for Renewable Energy	Energy: renewable energy commercialization	Hermann Scheer	2006	ISBN 1-84407355-6
Falter: Has the Human Game Begun to Play Itself Out?	Climate change: modern developments	Bill McKibben	2019	
Field Notes from a Catastrophe: Man, Nature, and Climate Change	Climate change: causes and effects in various places on Earth	Elizabeth Kolbert	2006	ISBN 1-59691-125-5
Greenhouse Solutions with Sustainable Energy	Energy: energy efficiency, renewable energy, and natural gas	Mark Diesendorf	2007	ISBN 978-0-86840-973-3
Half Gone: Oil, Gas, Hot Air and the Global Energy Crisis	Energy: oil depletion and global warming	Jeremy Leggett	2005	
Hard Choices: Climate Change in Canada	Climate change: effects in Canada	Harold Coward and Andrew J. Weaver	2004	ISBN 978-0-88920442-3
Heaven and Earth: Global Warming — The Missing Science	Global warming: dispute of scientific consensus on climate change	Ian Plimer	2009	ISBN 0-7043-7166-9
Hell and High Water: Global Warming — the Solution and the Politics — and What We Should Do	Global warming: evidence for dire consequences of inaction	Joseph J. Romm	2006	ISBN 0-06-117212-X
High and Dry: John Howard, Climate Change and the Selling of Australia's Future	Global warming: industrial lobbyists in Australia	Guy Pearse	2007	
The Hockey Stick and the Climate Wars: Dispatches from the Front Lines	Climate change: hockey stick graph	Michael E. Mann	2012	ISBN 0-23115254-X
The Hockey Stick Illusion: Climategate and the Corruption of Science	Climate change: hockey stick graph and Climatic Research Unit email controversy	Andrew Montford	2010	ISBN 978-1-906768-35-5
Hot, Flat, and Crowded: Why We Need a Green Revolution--And How It Can Renew America	Various themes: clean energy, globalization, and population growth	Thomas L. Friedman	2008	
How to Live a Low-Carbon Life: The Individual's Guide to Stopping Climate Change	Consumerism: reducing carbon footprint	Chris Goodall	2007	ISBN 978-1-84407426-6
The Hype about Hydrogen: Fact and Fiction in the Race to Save the Climate	Climate change: clean energy, advanced vehicles, energy security, and greenhouse gas mitigation	Joseph J. Romm	2004	ISBN 1-55963-703-X; ISBN 1-55963-704-8
An Inconvenient Truth: The Planetary Emergency of Global Warming and What We Can Do About It	Global warming: speed and extent documented with text and images	Al Gore	2006	ISBN 1-59486-567-1
Klima Macht Geschichte: Menschheitsgeschichte als Abbild der Klimaentwicklung	Climate change	Kenneth J. Hsu	2000	
Living in the Hothouse: How Global Warming Affects Australia	Climate change: government policy in Australia	Ian Lowe	2005	
Merchants of Doubt: How a Handful of Scientists Obscured the Truth on Issues from Tobacco Smoke to Global Warming	Global warming: comparisons with tobacco smoking, acid rain, and the ozone hole	Naomi Oreskes and Erik M. Conway	2010	ISBN 978-1-59691-610-4
Our Choice: A Plan to Solve the Climate Crisis	Climate change: solutions (concentrated solar power, cogeneration, and biochar)	Al Gore	2009	
Plows, Plagues and Petroleum: How Humans Took Control of Climate	Various themes: agriculture, diseases, and fossil fuels	William Ruddiman	2005	
Reaction Time: Climate Change and the Nuclear Option	Various themes: energy policy, and arguments against nuclear power	Ian Lowe	2007	ISBN 978-1-86395-412-9
The Real Global Warming Disaster (Is The Obsession With 'Climate Change' Turning Out To Be the Most Costly Scientific Blunder In History?)	Global warming: climate change denial from a denial perspective	Christopher Booker	2009	
Requiem for a Species: Why We Resist the Truth about Climate Change	Climate change: climate change denial from the perspective of climate change belief	Clive Hamilton	2010	ISBN 978-1-84971-081-7
The Revenge of Gaia: Why the Earth is Fighting Back - and How we Can Still Save Humanity	Various themes	James Lovelock	2007	ISBN 0-14-102597-2
Scorched: South Africa's Changing Climate	Climate change	Leonie Joubert	2007	
Scorcher: The Dirty Politics of Climate Change	Climate change: Kyoto Protocol and Australian politics	Clive Hamilton	2007	ISBN 978-0-9775949-0-0
Six Degrees: Our Future on a Hotter Planet	Climate change: effects from global temperature increasing by one to six degrees	Mark Lynas	2007	ISBN 978-0-00-720905-7
Storm World: Hurricanes, Politics, and the Battle Over Global Warming	Global warming: effect on hurricanes	Chris Mooney	2007	
Storms of My Grandchildren: The Truth About the Coming Climate Catastrophe and Our Last Chance to Save Humanity	Climate change: fossil fuels	James Hansen	2009	ISBN 978-1-60819-200-7
Straight Up: America's Fiercest Climate Blogger Takes on the Status Quo Media, Politicians, and Clean Energy Solutions	Various themes: energy security, energy efficiency, green energy, and sustainable transport	Joseph J. Romm	2010	ISBN 1-59726-716-3
Surviving the Century: Facing Climate Chaos and Other Global Challenges	Various themes: climate change, renewable energy commercialization, sustainable cities, and cradle-to-cradle design	Herbert Girardet	2007	
Taken By Storm: The Troubled Science, Policy and Politics of Global Warming	Global warming controversy: personalities and communication	Ross McKitrick and Christopher Essex	2002	ISBN 978-1-55263-946-7
Ten Technologies to Save the Planet (first edition) or Ten Technologies to Fix Energy and Climate (second edition)	Various themes: technologies for reducing greenhouse gases	Chris Goodall	2008 (first edition); 2009 (second edition)	ISBN 978-1-84668-868-3
Twisted: The Distorted Mathematics of Greenhouse Denial	Climate change: environmental skepticism	Ian G. Enting	2007	ISBN 978-0-646-48012-1
The Uninhabitable Earth. Life After Warming	Global warming	David Wallace-Wells	2019	ISBN 978-0-525-57670-9 (US)
Unstoppable Global Warming: Every 1,500 Years	Global warming: natural causes	S. Fred Singer and Dennis T. Avery	2006	ISBN 978-0-7425-5117-6
The Weather Makers: The History and Future Impact of Climate Change	Climate change: consequences of global warming	Tim Flannery	2005	ISBN 1-920885-84-6
The Weather of the Future: Heat Waves, Extreme Storms, and Other Scenes From a Climate-Changed Planet	Climate change: dangers from greenhouse gases from fossil fuels	Heidi Cullen	2010	
Whole Earth Discipline: An Ecopragmatist Manifesto	Various themes: climate change, urbanization, and biotechnology	Stewart Brand	2009	ISBN 978-0-670-02121-5
Why We Disagree About Climate Change: Understanding Controversy, Inaction and Opportunity	Climate change: differing views from various disciplines	Mike Hulme	2009	ISBN 978-0-521-72732-7

== Fiction ==
Title	Theme(s)	Author(s)	Year	ISBN(s)
The Helix	Cultivating our inner ability to create the world we want	Yasmeen Cohen	2022	ISBN 979-8-84881345-6
The Forgotten Enemy	Climate change	Arthur C. Clarke	1949	
Mother of Storms	Climate change: giant hurricane caused by nuclear explosion	John Barnes	1994	ISBN 0-312-85560-5
Fairhaven	Innovators, engineers, and visionaries struggle against the odds to bring climate solutions to Southeast Asia and to the world.	Genevieve Hilton (writing as Jan Lee) and Steve Willis	2024	ISBN 978-1-73908892-7

== See also ==
- Climate change in literature
- List of environmental books
