= Environmental impact of nuclear power =

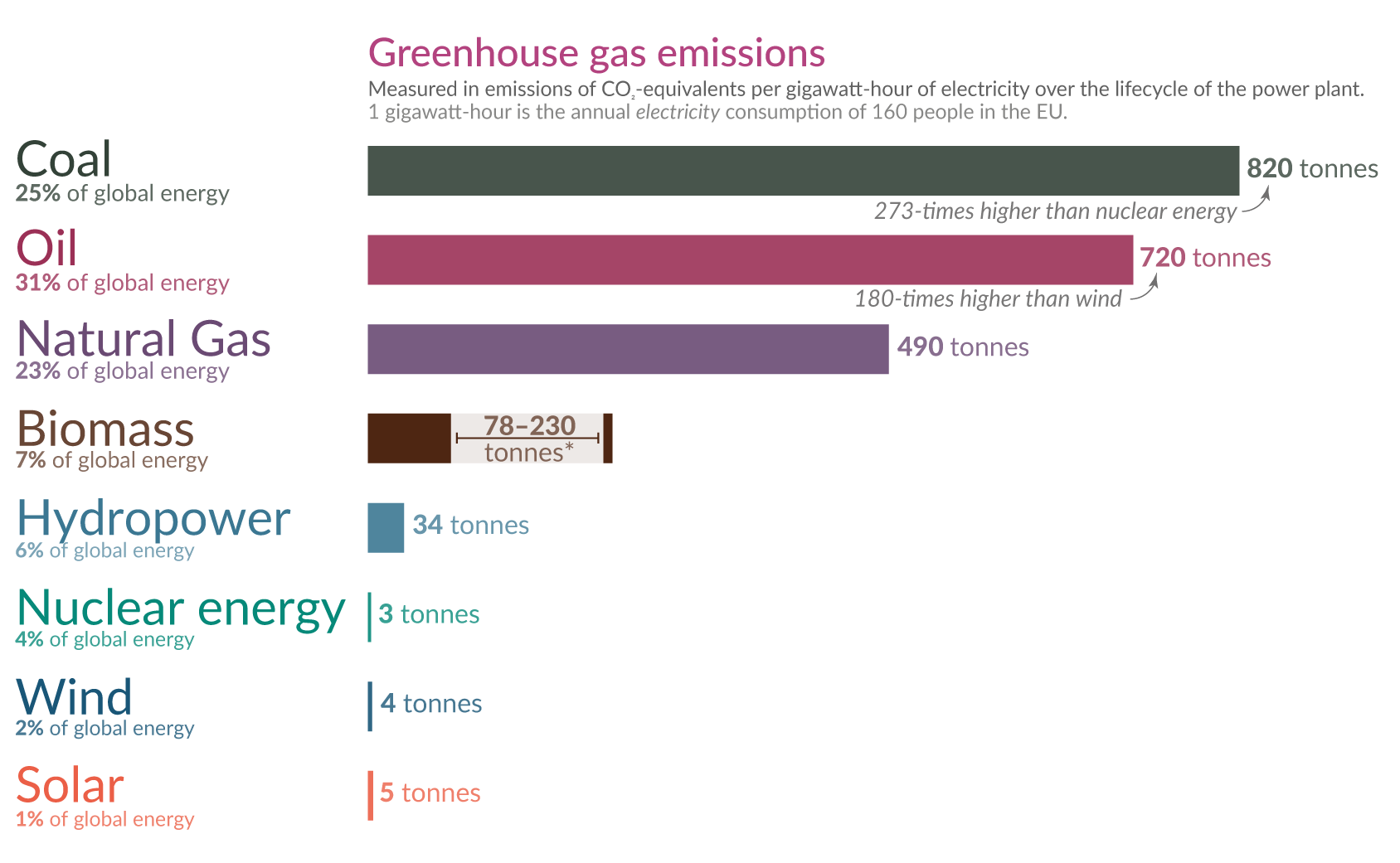
Greenhouse gas emissions per energy source. Nuclear power is one of the sources with the least greenhouse gas emissions.

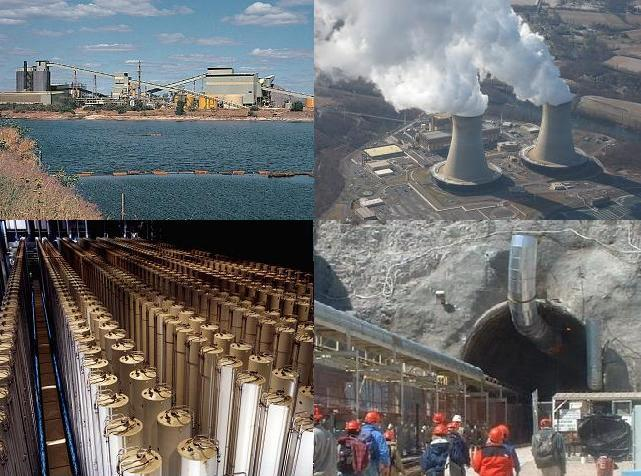
Nuclear power activities involving the environment; mining, enrichment, generation and geological disposal.

Nuclear power has various environmental impacts, both positive and negative, including the construction and operation of the plant, the nuclear fuel cycle, and the effects of nuclear accidents. Nuclear power plants do not burn fossil fuels and so do not directly emit carbon dioxide. The carbon dioxide emitted during mining, enrichment, fabrication and transport of fuel is small when compared with the carbon dioxide emitted by fossil fuels of similar energy yield, however, these plants still produce other environmentally damaging wastes. Nuclear energy and renewable energy have reduced environmental costs by decreasing CO_{2} emissions resulting from energy consumption.

There is a catastrophic risk potential if containment fails, which in nuclear reactors can be brought about by overheated fuels melting and releasing large quantities of fission products into the environment. In normal operation, nuclear power plants release less radioactive material than coal power plants whose fly ash contains significant amounts of thorium, uranium and their daughter nuclides.

A large nuclear power plant may reject waste heat to a natural body of water; this can result in undesirable increase of the water temperature with adverse effect on aquatic life. Alternatives include cooling towers.

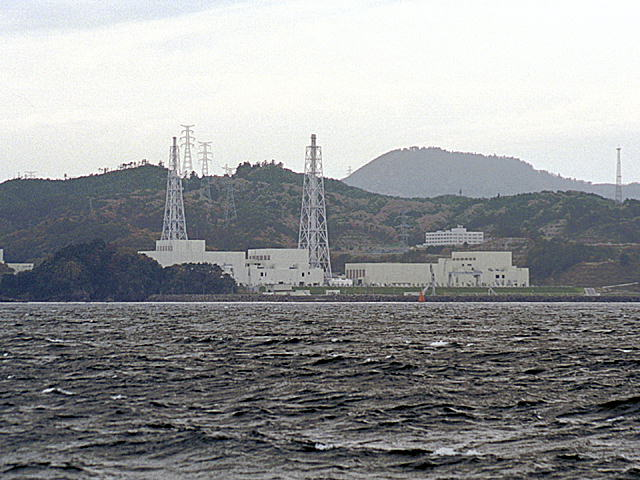
The Onagawa Nuclear Power Plant – a plant that cools by direct use of ocean water, not requiring a cooling tower

Mining of uranium ore can disrupt the environment around the mine. However, with modern in-situ leaching technology this impact can be reduced compared to "classical" underground or open-pit mining. Disposal of spent nuclear fuel is controversial, with many proposed long-term storage schemes under intense review and criticism. Diversion of fresh- or low-burnup spent fuel to weapons production presents a risk of nuclear proliferation, however all nuclear weapons states derived the material for their first nuclear weapon from (non-power) research reactors or dedicated "production reactors" and/or uranium enrichment. Finally, some parts the structure of the reactor itself becomes radioactive through neutron activation and will require decades of storage before it can be economically dismantled and in turn disposed of as waste. Measures like reducing the cobalt content in steel to decrease the amount of cobalt-60 produced by neutron capture can reduce the amount of radioactive material produced and the radiotoxicity that originates from this material. However, part of the issue is not radiological but regulatory as most countries assume any given object that originates from the "hot" (radioactive) area of a nuclear power plant or a facility in the nuclear fuel cycle is ipso facto radioactive, even if no contamination or neutron irradiation induced radioactivity is detectable.

== Waste streams ==
Nuclear power has at least three waste streams that may impact the environment:

1. Spent nuclear fuel at the reactor site (including fission products and plutonium waste)
2. Tailings and waste rock at uranium mining mills
3. Releases of ill-defined quantities of radioactive materials during accidents

Nuclear reprocessing and breeder reactors which can decrease the need for storage of spent fuel in a deep geological repository have faced economic and political hurdles but are in some use in Russia, India, China, Japan and France, which are among the countries with the highest nuclear energy production outside the United States. However, the U.S. has not undertaken significant efforts towards either reprocessing or breeder reactors since the 1970s instead relying on the once through fuel cycle.

== Radioactive waste ==
=== High-level waste ===
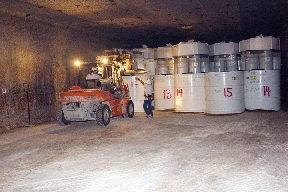
Technicians emplacing transuranic waste at the Waste Isolation Pilot Plant, near Carlsbad, New Mexico. Various mishaps at the plant in 2014 brought focus to the problem of what to do with a mounting stockpile of spent fuel, from commercial nuclear reactors, currently stored at individual reactor sites. In 2010, the USDOE mothballed plans to develop the Yucca Mountain nuclear waste repository in Nevada.

The spent nuclear fuel from uranium-235 and plutonium-239 nuclear fission contains a wide variety of carcinogenic radionuclide isotopes such as strontium-90, iodine-131, and caesium-137. Such waste includes some of the most long-lived transuranic elements such as americium-241 and isotopes of plutonium. The most long-lived radioactive wastes, including spent nuclear fuel, usually must be contained and isolated from the environment for a long period of time. Spent nuclear fuel storage is mostly a problem in the United States, following a 1977 prohibition by then-President Jimmy Carter on nuclear fuel recycling. France, The United Kingdom, and Japan are some of the countries that have rejected the repository solution. Spent nuclear fuel produced by some types of reactors is a valuable asset, not simply waste.

Disposal of these wastes in specially-engineered underground repositories is the preferred long-term storage solution. The International Panel on Fissile Materials has said:

It is widely accepted that spent nuclear fuel and high-level reprocessing and plutonium wastes require well-designed storage for long periods of time, to minimize releases of the contained radioactivity into the environment. Safeguards are also required to ensure that neither plutonium nor highly enriched uranium is diverted to weapon use. There is general agreement that placing spent nuclear fuel in repositories hundreds of meters below the surface would be safer than indefinite storage of spent fuel on the surface.

When designing long-term storage facilities, there are several crucial considerations, including the specific type of radioactive waste, the containers enclosing the waste, other engineered barriers or seals around the containers, the tunnels housing the containers, and the geologic makeup of the surrounding area.

The ability of natural geologic barriers to isolate radioactive waste is demonstrated by the natural nuclear fission reactors at Oklo, Africa. During their long reaction period, about 5.4 metric tons of fission products, 1.5 metric tons of plutonium, and other transuranic elements were generated in the uranium ore body. These elements remain immobile and stable to this day, a span of almost 2 billion years.

Despite long-standing agreement among many experts that geological disposal can be safe, technologically feasible, and environmentally sound, a large part of the general public in many countries remains skeptical. One of the challenges facing the supporters of these efforts is to demonstrate confidently that a repository will contain waste for so long that future containment breaches will pose no significant health or environmental risks.

Nuclear reprocessing does not eliminate the need for a repository, but it reduces the required volume, the need for long-term heat dissipation, and the long-term radiation hazard. Reprocessing does not eliminate the political and social challenges to repository siting.

The countries that have made the most progress towards a repository for high-level radioactive waste have typically started with public consultations and made voluntary siting a necessary condition. This consensus-seeking approach is believed to have a greater chance of success than top-down modes of decision making, but the process is necessarily slow, and there is "inadequate experience around the world to know if it will succeed in all existing and aspiring nuclear nations." Moreover, many communities do not want to host a nuclear waste repository as they are "concerned about their community becoming a de facto site for waste for thousands of years, the health and environmental consequences of an accident, and lower property values."

In a 2010 Presidential Memorandum, U.S. President Obama established the Blue Ribbon Commission on America's Nuclear Future. The commission, composed of fifteen members, conducted an extensive two-year study of nuclear waste disposal. During their research, the Commission visited Finland, France, Japan, Russia, Sweden, and the UK, and in 2012, the Commission submitted its final report. The Commission did not issue recommendations for a specific site but rather presented a comprehensive recommendation for disposal strategies. One major recommendation was that "the United States should undertake an integrated nuclear waste management program that leads to the timely development of one or more permanent deep geological facilities for the safe disposal of spent fuel and high-level nuclear waste."

Pressurized heavy water reactors like the Canadian CANDU or the Indian IPHWR do not need enriched fuel and can operate using natural uranium. This allows better use of the energy contained in the initial uranium ore (while higher enrichment allows higher burnup, the amount of natural uranium needed to produce this fuel increases faster than the achievable burnup) and reduces the energy needed in fuel manufacturing as the conversion of the yellowcake to uranium hexafluoride and back into an oxide fuel as well as the energy-intensive enrichment process can be skipped.

=== Other waste ===
Moderate amounts of low-level waste are managed through a chemical and volume control system (CVCS). This includes gas, liquid, and solid waste produced via the process of purifying the water through evaporation. Liquid waste is reprocessed continuously, and gas waste is filtered, compressed, stored to allow decay, diluted, and then discharged. The rate at which this is allowed is regulated and studies must prove that such discharge does not pose public health risks (see radioactive effluent emissions).

Solid waste can be disposed of simply by placing it where it will not be disturbed for a few years. There are three low-level waste disposal sites in the United States, in South Carolina, Utah, and Washington. Solid waste from the CVCS is combined with solid waste that comes from handling materials before it is buried off-site.

== Power plant emission ==
=== Radioactive gases and effluents ===
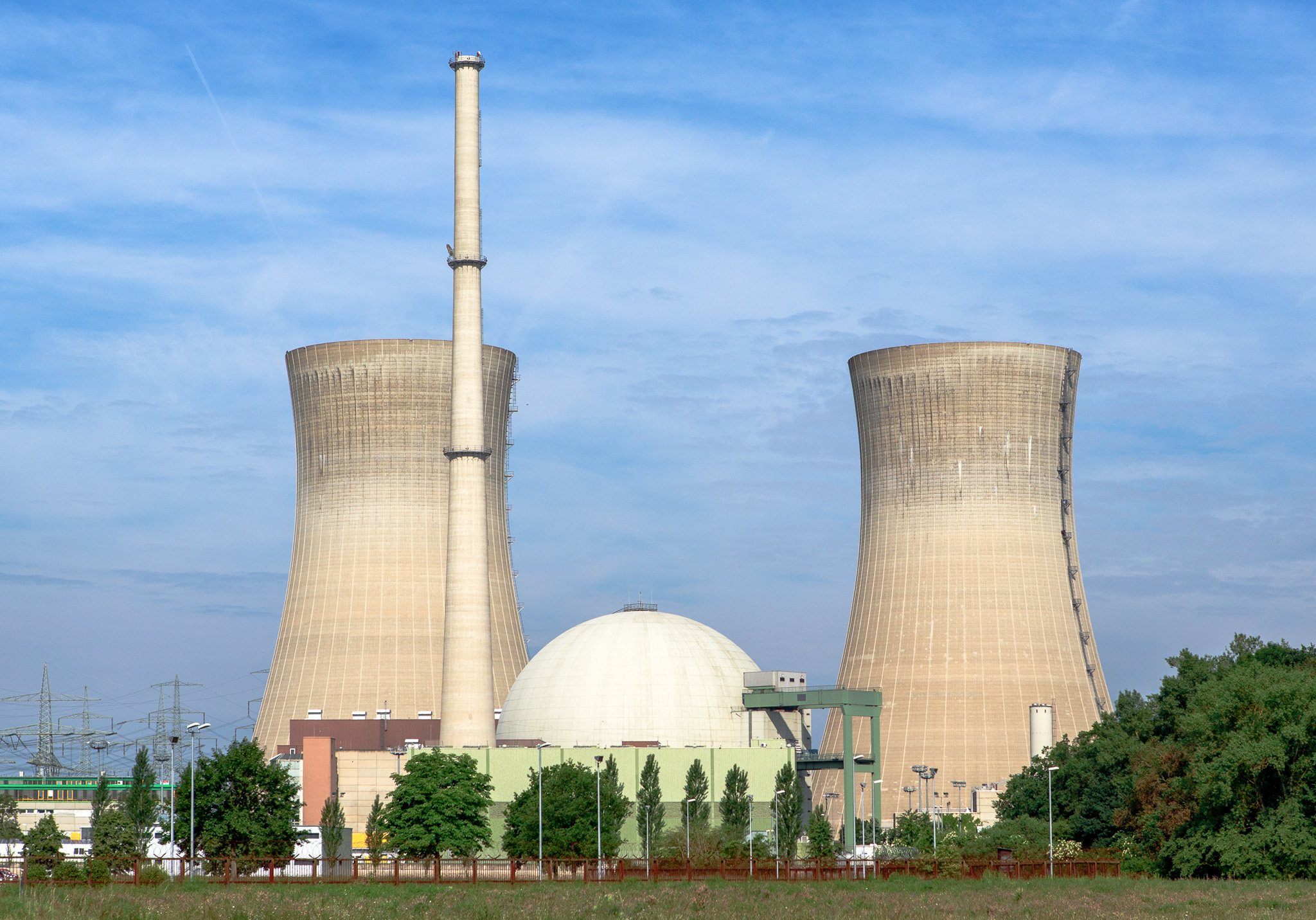
The Grafenrheinfeld Nuclear Power Plant. The tallest structure is the chimney that releases effluent gases.

Most commercial nuclear power plants release gaseous and liquid radiological effluents into the environment as a byproduct of the Chemical Volume Control System. These effluents are monitored in the US by the EPA and the NRC. Civilians living within 50 miles (80 km) of a nuclear power plant typically receive about 0.1 μSv per year. For comparison, the average person living at or above sea level receives at least 260 μSv per year from cosmic radiation.

All reactors in the United States are required by law to have a containment building. The walls of containment buildings are several feet thick and made of concrete designed to stop the release of any radiation emitted by the reactor into the environment. For comparison:

The waste produced by coal plants is actually more radioactive than that generated by their nuclear counterparts. In fact, the fly ash emitted by a [coal] power plant—a by-product from burning coal for electricity—carries into the surrounding environment 100 times more radiation than a nuclear power plant producing the same amount of energy. . . . Estimated radiation doses ingested by people living near the coal plants were equal to or higher than doses for people living around the nuclear facilities. At one extreme, the scientists estimated fly ash radiation in individuals' bones at around 18 millirems (thousandths of a rem, a unit for measuring doses of ionizing radiation) a year. Doses for the two nuclear plants, by contrast, ranged from between three and six millirems for the same period. And when all food was grown in the area, radiation doses were 50 to 200 percent higher around the coal plants.

The total amount of radioactivity released through the CVCS depends on the power plant, the regulatory requirements, and the plant's performance. Atmospheric dispersion models combined with pathway models are employed to accurately approximate the exposure to a member of the public from the effluents emitted. Effluent monitoring is conducted continuously at the plant.

==== Tritium ====
Tritium Effluent Limits
Country	Limit (Bq/L)
Australia	76,103
Finland	30,000
WHO	10,000
Switzerland	10,000
Russia	7,700
Ontario, Canada	7,000
European Union	1001
United States	740
California Public Health Goal	14.8

A leak of radioactive water at Vermont Yankee in 2010, along with similar incidents at more than 20 other US nuclear plants in recent years, has kindled doubts about the reliability, durability, and maintenance of aging nuclear installations in the United States.

Tritium is a radioactive isotope of hydrogen that emits a low-energy beta particle and is usually measured in becquerels (i.e. atoms decaying per second) per liter (Bq/L). Tritium can be contained in water released from a nuclear plant. The primary concern for tritium release is its presence in drinking water, in addition to biological magnification leading to tritium in crops and animals consumed for food.

Legal concentration limits of tritium have differed greatly from place to place (see table right). For example, in June 2009 the Ontario Drinking Water Advisory Council recommended lowering the limit from 7,000 Bq/L to 20 Bq/L. According to the NRC, tritium is the least dangerous radionuclide because it emits very weak radiation and leaves the body relatively quickly.

==== Uranium mining ====
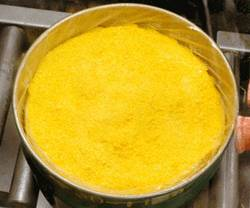
A drum of yellowcake

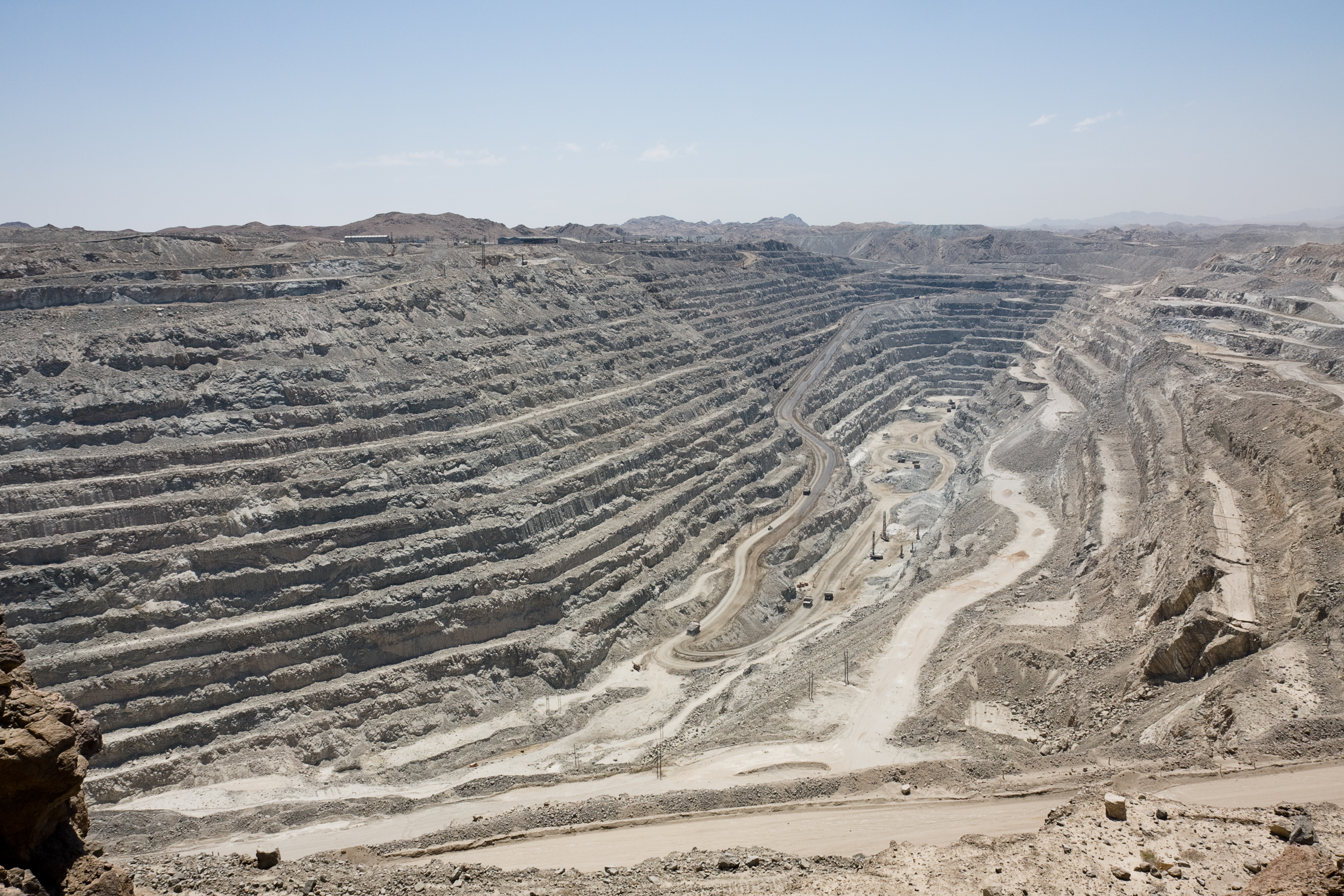
Rössing open pit uranium mine, Namibia

Uranium mining is the process of extracting uranium ore from the ground. Kazakhstan, Canada, and Australia are the top three producers and together account for 63% of world uranium production. A prominent use of uranium is as fuel for nuclear power plants. The mining and milling of uranium present significant dangers to the environment.

In 2010, 41% of the world's uranium production was produced by in-situ leaching, which uses solutions to dissolve the uranium while leaving the rock in place. The remainder was produced by conventional mining, in which the mined uranium ore is ground to a uniform particle size and then the uranium extracted by chemical leaching. The product is a powder of unenriched uranium, "yellowcake," which is sold on the uranium market as U_{3}O_{8}. Uranium mining can use large amounts of water—for example, the Roxby Downs Olympic Dam mine in South Australia uses 35,000 m^{3} of water each day and plans to increase this to 150,000 m^{3} per day.

The Church Rock uranium mill spill occurred in New Mexico on July 16, 1979, when the tailings disposal pond breached its dam. Over 1,000 tons of solid radioactive mill waste and 93 million gallons of acidic, radioactive tailings solution flowed into the Puerco River, and contaminants traveled 80 miles (130 km) downstream to Navajo County, Arizona and onto the Navajo Nation. The accident released more radiation than the Three Mile Island accident that occurred four months earlier and was the largest release of radioactive material in U.S. history, although the radioactive material was diluted by the 93 million gallons of water and sulfuric acid. Groundwater near the spill was contaminated and the Puerco rendered unusable by local residents, who were not immediately aware of the toxic danger.

Despite efforts made in cleaning up Cold War nuclear arms race uranium sites, significant problems stemming from the legacy of uranium development still exist today on the Navajo Nation and in the states of Utah, Colorado, New Mexico, and Arizona. Hundreds of abandoned mines, primarily used for the US arms race and not nuclear energy production, have not been cleaned up and present environmental and health risks in many communities. The Environmental Protection Agency estimates that there are 4,000 mines with documented uranium production, and another 15,000 locations with uranium occurrences in 14 western states, most found in the Four Corners area and Wyoming. The Uranium Mill Tailings Radiation Control Act is a United States environmental law that amended the Atomic Energy Act of 1954 and gave the Environmental Protection Agency the authority to establish health and environmental standards for the stabilization, restoration, and disposal of uranium mill waste.

=== Cancer ===
Numerous studies have been done on the possible relationship between nuclear power and cancer. Such studies have looked for excess cancers in both plant workers and surrounding populations due to releases during normal operations of nuclear plants and other parts of the nuclear power industry, as well as excess cancers in workers and the public due to accidental releases. There is agreement that excess cancers in both plant workers and the surrounding public have been caused by accidental releases such as the Chernobyl accident. There is also agreement that some workers in other parts of the nuclear fuel cycle (most notably uranium mining) have had elevated rates of cancer, at least in past decades. Excess mortality is associated with all mining activity and is not unique to uranium mining. However, numerous studies of possible cancers caused by nuclear power plants in normal operation have come to opposing conclusions, and the issue is a matter of scientific controversy and ongoing study.

Several epidemiological studies have found that there is an increased risk of various diseases, especially cancers, among people who live near nuclear facilities. A widely cited 2007 meta-analysis by Baker et al. of 17 research papers was published in the European Journal of Cancer Care. It offered evidence of elevated leukemia rates among children living near 136 nuclear facilities in the United Kingdom, Canada, France, United States, Germany, Japan, and Spain. However, this study has been criticized for several reasons, such as its combination of heterogeneous data (different age groups, sites that were not nuclear power plants, different zone definitions), arbitrary selection of 17 out of 37 individual studies, and exclusion of sites with zero observed cases or deaths.

Elevated leukemia rates among children were also found in a 2008 German study by Kaatsch et al. that examined residents living near 16 major nuclear power plants in Germany. This study has also been criticized for reasons similar to those described above. These 2007 and 2008 results are not consistent with many other studies that have tended not to show such associations. The British Committee on Medical Aspects of Radiation in the Environment issued a study in 2011 of children under five living near 13 nuclear power plants in the UK during the period 1969–2004. The committee found that children living near power plants in Britain are no more likely to develop leukemia than those living elsewhere. Similarly, a 1991 study for the National Cancer Institute found no excess cancer mortalities in 107 US counties close to nuclear power plants. However, in view of the ongoing controversy, the US Nuclear Regulatory Commission has requested the National Academy of Sciences to oversee a state-of-the-art study of cancer risk in populations near NRC-licensed facilities.

A subculture of frequently undocumented nuclear workers do the dirty, difficult, and potentially dangerous work often shunned by regular employees. The World Nuclear Association states that the transient workforce of "nuclear gypsies"—casual workers employed by subcontractors—has been "part of the nuclear scene for at least four decades." Existing labor laws regarding worker health are not always properly enforced. A 15-country collaborative cohort study of cancer risks due to exposure to low-dose ionizing radiation, involving 407,391 nuclear industry workers, showed significant increase in cancer mortality. The study evaluated 31 types of cancers, primary and secondary.

Nuclear power reactor accidents can result in a variety of radioisotopes being released into the environment. The health impact of each radioisotope depends on a variety of factors. Iodine-131 is potentially an important source of morbidity in accidental discharges because of its prevalence and because it settles on the ground. When iodine-131 is released, it can be inhaled or consumed after it enters the food chain, primarily through contaminated fruits, vegetables, milk, and groundwater. Iodine-131 in the body rapidly accumulates in the thyroid gland, becoming a source of beta radiation.

The 2011 Fukushima Daiichi nuclear disaster, the most serious nuclear accident since 1986, resulted in the displacement of 50,000 households. Radiation checks led to bans of some shipments of vegetables and fish. However, according to UN reports, the radiation leaks were small and did not cause any health problems in residents. Evacuation of residents was criticized as not scientifically justified.

Production of nuclear power relies on the nuclear fuel cycle, which includes uranium mining and milling. Uranium workers are routinely exposed to low levels of radon decay products and gamma radiation. Risks of leukemia from acute and high doses of gamma radiation are well-known, but there is debate about risks from lower doses. Only a few studies have examined the risks of other hematological cancers in uranium workers.

=== Comparison to coal-fired power generation ===
In terms of net radioactive release, the National Council on Radiation Protection and Measurements (NCRP) estimated the average radioactivity per short ton of coal is 17,100 millicuries per 4,000,000 tons. With 154 coal plants in the United States, this amounts to emissions of 0.6319 TBq per year, per plant.

It is sometimes cited that coal plants release 100 times the radioactivity of nuclear plants. This comes from NCRP Reports No. 92 and No. 95, which estimate the dose to the population from 1000 MWe coal and nuclear plants at 4.9 man-Sv/year and 0.048 man-Sv/year, respectively (a typical Chest x-ray gives a dose of about 0.06 mSv, for comparison). The Environmental Protection Agency estimates an added dose of 0.3 μSv per year for living within 50 miles (80 km) of a coal plant and 0.009 milli-rem per year for those living within the same distance of a nuclear plant. Nuclear power plants in normal operation emit less radioactivity than coal power plants.

Unlike coal-fired or oil-fired power generation, nuclear power generation does not directly produce any sulfur dioxide, nitrogen oxides, or mercury (pollution from fossil fuels is blamed for 24,000 early deaths each year in the U.S. alone). However, as with all energy sources, there is some pollution associated with support activities such as mining, manufacturing, and transportation.

A major European Union-funded research study known as ExternE, or Externalities of Energy, undertaken from 1995 to 2005 found that the environmental and health costs of nuclear power, per unit of energy delivered, was €0.0019/kWh. This is lower than that of many renewable sources, including the environmental impact caused by biomass use and the manufacture of photovoltaic solar panels, and was over thirty times lower than coal's impact of €0.06/kWh, or 6 cents/kWh. However, wind power's impact was €0.0009/kWh, just under half the price of nuclear power.

In May 2023, the Washington Post wrote, "Had Germany kept its nuclear plants running from 2010, it could have slashed its use of coal for electricity to 13 percent by now. Today's figure is 31 percent... Already more lives might have been lost just in Germany because of air pollution from coal power than from all of the world's nuclear accidents to date, Fukushima and Chernobyl included."

=== Contrast of radioactive accident emissions with industrial emissions ===
Proponents of nuclear power argue that the problems of nuclear waste "do not come anywhere close" to approaching the problems of fossil fuel waste. A 2004 article from the BBC states: "The World Health Organization (WHO) says 3 million people are killed worldwide by outdoor air pollution annually from vehicles and industrial emissions, and 1.6 million indoors through using solid fuel." In the U.S. alone, fossil fuel waste kills 20,000 people each year. A coal power plant releases 100 times as much radiation as a nuclear power plant of the same wattage. It is estimated that during 1982, US coal burning released 155 times as much radioactivity into the atmosphere as the Three Mile Island accident. The World Nuclear Association provides a comparison of deaths due to accidents among different forms of energy production. In their life-cycle comparison, deaths per TW-yr of electricity produced from 1970 to 1992 are quoted as 885 for hydropower, 342 for coal, 85 for natural gas, and 8 for nuclear. The figures include uranium mining, which can be a hazardous industry, with many accidents and fatalities.

=== Waste heat ===
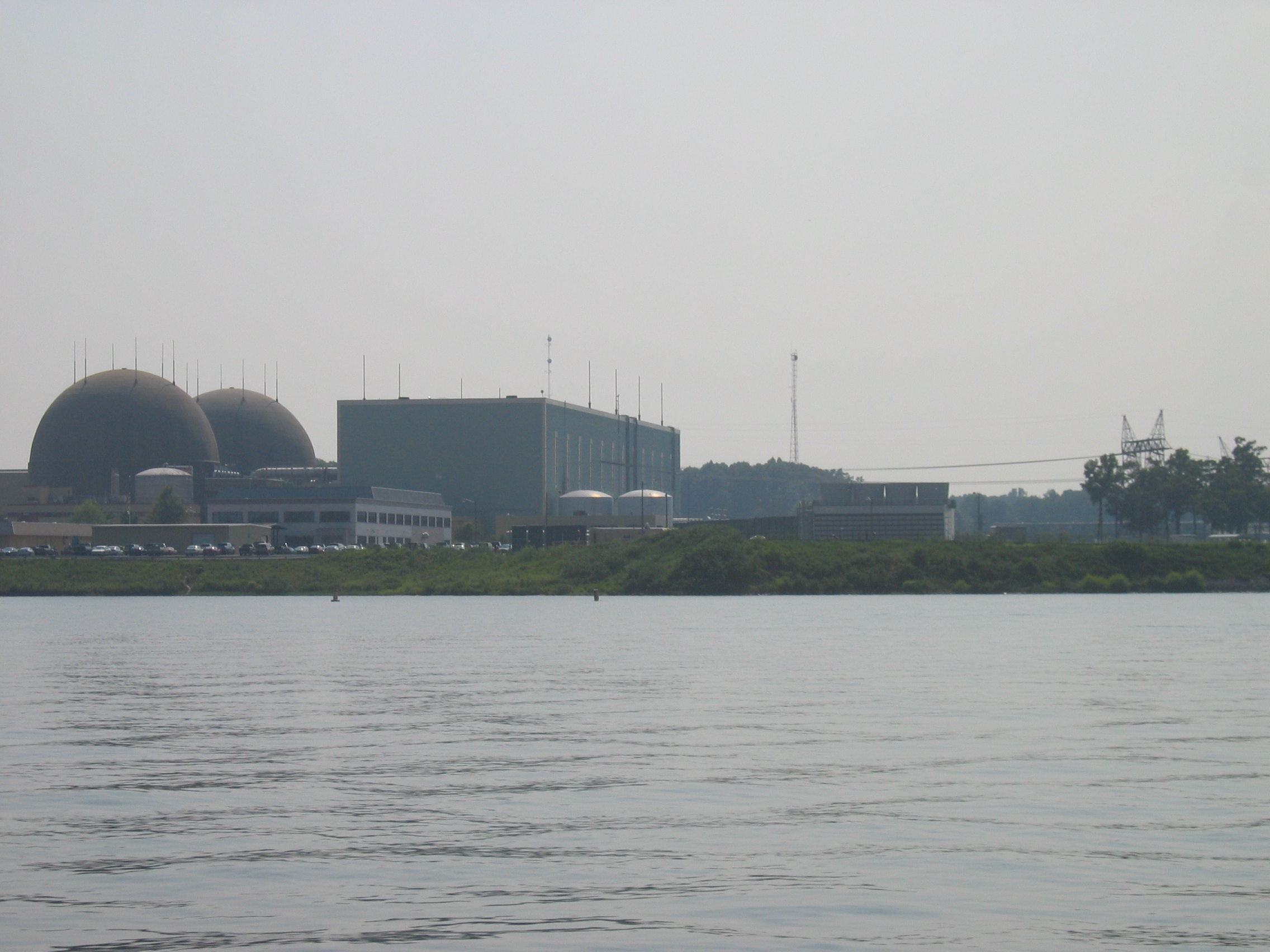
The North Anna plant uses direct exchange cooling into an artificial lake.

As with all thermoelectric plants, nuclear power plants need cooling systems. The most common systems for thermal power plants, including nuclear, are:

- Once-through cooling, in which water is drawn from a large body, passes through the cooling system, and then flows back into the water body.
- Cooling pond, in which water is drawn from a pond dedicated to the purpose, passes through the cooling system, then returns to the pond. Examples include the South Texas Nuclear Generating Station and the North Anna Nuclear Generating Station. The latter uses a cooling pond or artificial lake, which at the plant discharge canal is often about 30 °F warmer than in the other parts of the lake or in normal lakes (this is cited as an attraction of the area by some residents). The environmental effects of the artificial lakes are often weighted in arguments against construction of new plants, and during droughts such lakes have drawn media attention. The Turkey Point Nuclear Generating Station is credited with helping the conservation status of the American Crocodile, largely an effect of the waste heat produced.
- Cooling towers, in which water recirculates through the cooling system until it evaporates from the tower. Examples include the Shearon Harris Nuclear Power Plant.

A 2011 study by the National Renewable Energy Laboratory determined that the median nuclear plant with cooling towers consumed 672 gallons of water per megawatt-hour, less than the median consumption of concentrating solar power (865 gal/MWhr for trough type, and 786 gal/MWhr for power tower type), slightly less than coal (687 gal/MWhr), but more than that for natural gas (198 gal/MWhr). Once-through cooling systems use more water, but less water is lost to evaporation. In the median US nuclear plant with once-through cooling, 44,350 gal/MWhr pass through the cooling system, but only 269 gal/MWhr (less than 1 percent) is consumed by evaporation.

Nuclear plants exchange 60 to 70% of their thermal energy by cycling with a body of water or by evaporating water through a cooling tower. This thermal efficiency is somewhat lower than that of coal-fired power plants, thus creating more waste heat.

It is possible to use waste heat in cogeneration applications such as district heating. The principles of cogeneration and district heating with nuclear power are the same as any other form of thermal power production. The Ågesta Nuclear Power Plant in Sweden provides nuclear heat generation. In Switzerland, the Beznau Nuclear Power Plant provides heat to about 20,000 people. However, district heating with nuclear power plants is less common than with other modes of waste heat generation; because of either siting regulations and/or the NIMBY effect, nuclear stations are generally not built in densely populated areas. Waste heat is more commonly used in industrial applications. As district heating has a seasonal demand curve it is often only a seasonal solution of the waste heat problem. Furthermore, district heating is less efficient in less densely populated areas and as nuclear power plants are often constructed far out of population centers due to NIMBY and safety concerns, the usage of nuclear district heating hasn't been widespread.

During Europe's 2003 and 2006 heat waves, French, Spanish, and German utilities had to secure exemptions from regulations in order to discharge overheated water into the environment. Some nuclear reactors shut down.

With climate change causing weather extremes such as heat waves, reduced precipitation levels and droughts can have a significant impact on thermal power station infrastructure, including large biomass-electric and fission-electric stations if cooling in these power stations is provided by certain freshwater sources. A number of thermal stations use indirect seawater cooling or cooling towers that use little to no freshwater. During heat waves, some stations designed to heat exchange with rivers and lakes are legally required to reduce output or cease operations to protect water levels and aquatic life.

This presently infrequent problem common among all thermal power stations may become increasingly significant over time. If global warming continues, disruption of electricity may occur if station operators do not have other means of cooling, like cooling towers available.

Nuclear plants, like all thermal power plants including coal, geothermal and biomass power plants, use special structures to draw in water for cooling. Water is often drawn through screens to minimize debris. Many aquatic organisms are trapped and killed against the screens, through a process known as impingement. Aquatic organisms small enough to pass through the screens are subject to toxic stress in a process known as entrainment.

Summer shutdowns are especially pronounced in France, which produces some 70% of electricity with nuclear power plants and where electric home heating is widespread. However, in regions with high heating, ventilation, and air conditioning power use, the summer season, rather than imposing lower power demands, may be the peak season of electricity demand, complicating scheduled summer shutdowns.

== Greenhouse gas emissions ==
Over its lifecycle nuclear energy has low greenhouse gas (GHG) emissions. Many stages of the nuclear fuel chain—mining, milling, transport, fuel fabrication, enrichment, reactor construction, decommissioning, and waste management—use fossil fuels or involve changes to land use, and hence emit some carbon dioxide and conventional pollutants.

Nuclear energy produces about 10 grams of carbon dioxide per kilowatt hour, compared to about 500 for fossil gas and 1000 for coal. Like all energy sources, various life cycle analysis (LCA) studies have led to a range of estimates on the median value for nuclear power, with most comparisons of carbon dioxide emissions showing that nuclear power is comparable to renewable energy sources.

Many people have argued that an expansion of nuclear power would help combat climate change. A 2025 study found that each nuclear reactor closure in the United States between 1993 and 2022 increased state-level per-capita carbon emissions between 6% and 8%. Others have argued that it is one way to reduce emissions, but it comes with its own problems, such as risks related to severe nuclear accidents, attacks on nuclear sites, and nuclear terrorism. Some activists also believe that there are better ways of dealing with climate change than investing in nuclear power, including the improved energy efficiency and greater reliance on decentralized and renewable energy sources.

== Environmental effects of accidents and attacks ==
The 1979 Three Mile Island accident and 1986 Chernobyl disaster, along with high construction costs and delays resulting from demonstrations, injunctions, and political actions by anti-nuclear activists, effectively ended the rapid growth of global nuclear power capacity. A release of radioactive materials followed the 2011 Japanese tsunami which damaged the Fukushima I Nuclear Power Plant, resulting in hydrogen gas explosions and partial meltdowns. The Fukushima disaster was classified a Level 7 event. The large-scale release of radioactivity resulted in people being evacuated from a 20 km exclusion zone set up around the power plant, similar to the 30 km radius Chernobyl Exclusion Zone still in effect. Published works suggest that the radioactivity levels around Chernobyl have lowered enough to now have only a limited impact on wildlife.

In Japan, in July 2016, Fukushima Prefecture announced that the number of evacuees following the Great East Japan earthquake events had fallen below 90,000, in part because of the lifting of evacuation orders issued in some municipalities.

=== Fukushima disaster ===
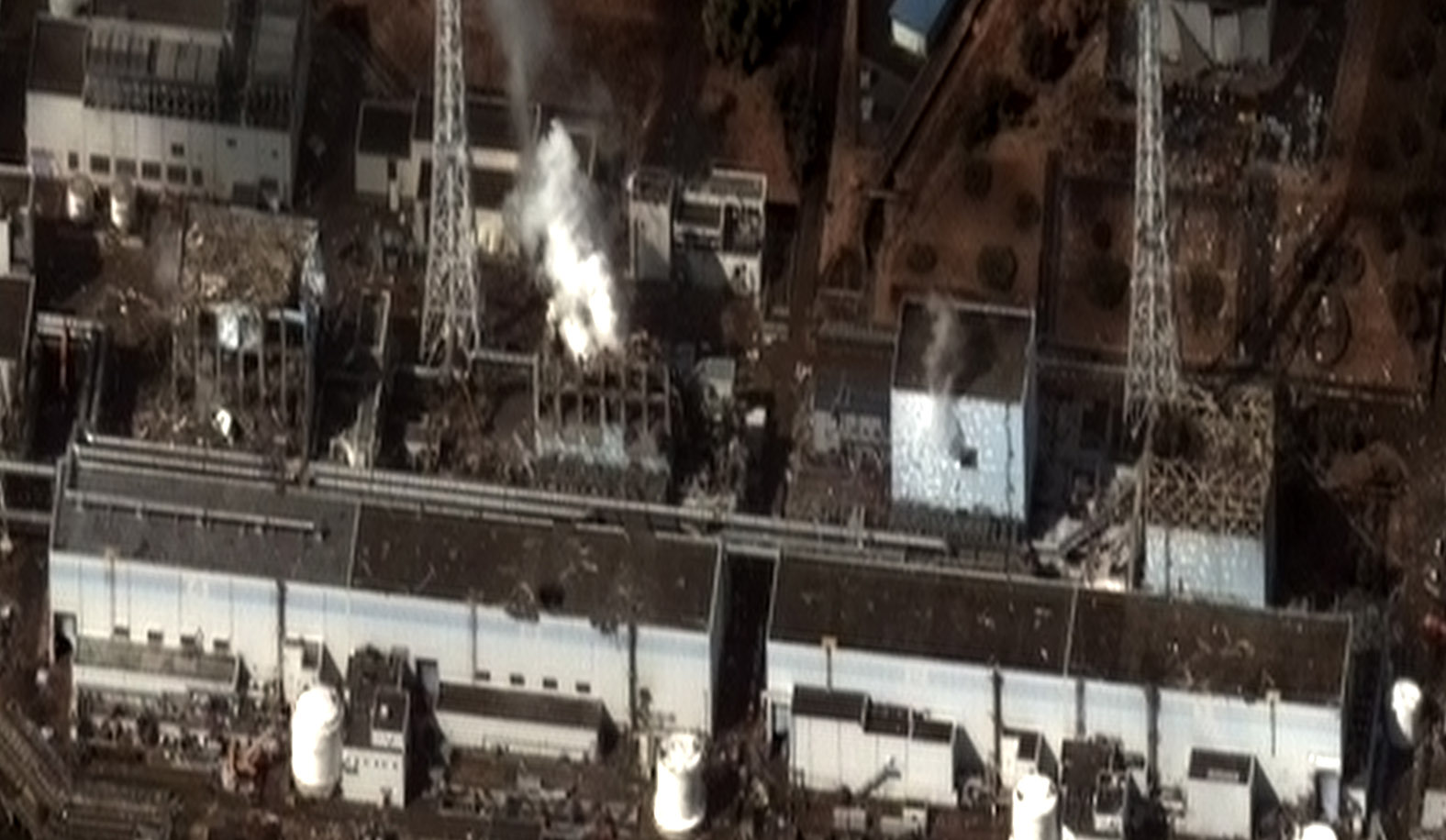
Following the 2011 Japanese Fukushima nuclear disaster, authorities shut down the nation's 54 nuclear power plants. As of 2013, the Fukushima site remains highly radioactive, with some 160,000 evacuees still living in temporary housing, and some land will be unfarmable for centuries. The difficult cleanup job will take 40 or more years, and cost tens of billions of dollars.

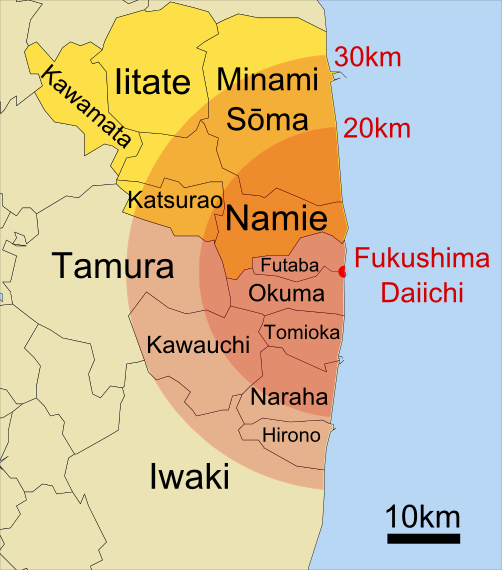
Japan towns, villages, and cities around the Fukushima Daiichi nuclear plant. The 20km and 30km areas had evacuation and sheltering orders, and additional administrative districts that had an evacuation order are highlighted.

In March 2011, an earthquake and tsunami caused damage that led to explosions and partial meltdowns at the Fukushima I Nuclear Power Plant in Japan.

Since then, radiation levels at the Fukushima I power plant have varied, spiking up to 1,000 mSv/h (millisievert per hour), which can cause radiation sickness to occur following a one-hour exposure. Significant emissions of radioactive particles took place following hydrogen explosions at three reactors, as technicians tried to pump in seawater to keep the uranium fuel rods cool and bled radioactive gas from the reactors in order to make room for the seawater.

Concerns about the possibility of a large-scale release of radioactive material resulted in 20 km exclusion zone being set up around the power plant and people within the 20–30 km band being advised to stay indoors. Later, the UK, France, and some other countries told their nationals to consider leaving Tokyo, in response to fears of spreading nuclear contamination. New Scientist reported that emissions of radioactive iodine and cesium from the crippled Fukushima I nuclear plant have approached levels evident after the Chernobyl disaster in 1986. On March 24, 2011, Japanese officials announced that "radioactive iodine-131 exceeding safety limits for infants had been detected at 18 water-purification plants in Tokyo and five other prefectures." Officials said also that the fallout from the Dai-ichi plant is "hindering search efforts for victims from the March 11 earthquake and tsunami."

According to the Federation of Electric Power Companies of Japan, "by April 27 approximately 55 percent of the fuel in reactor unit 1 had melted, along with 35 percent of the fuel in unit 2, and 30 percent of the fuel in unit 3; and overheated spent fuels in the storage pools of units 3 and 4 probably were also damaged." As of April 2011, water was still being poured into the damaged reactors to cool melting fuel rods. The accident has surpassed the 1979 Three Mile Island accident in seriousness and is comparable to the 1986 Chernobyl disaster. The Economist reported that the Fukushima disaster is "a bit like three Three Mile Islands in a row, with added damage in the spent-fuel stores," and that there will be ongoing impacts:

Years of clean-up will drag into decades. A permanent exclusion zone could end up stretching beyond the plant's perimeter. Seriously exposed workers may be at increased risk of cancers for the rest of their lives...

John Price, a former member of the Safety Policy Unit at the UK's National Nuclear Corporation, said that it "might be 100 years before melting fuel rods can be safely removed from Japan's Fukushima nuclear plant."

In the second half of August 2011, Japanese lawmakers announced that Prime Minister Naoto Kan would likely visit the Fukushima Prefecture to announce that the large, contaminated area around the destroyed reactors would be declared uninhabitable, perhaps for decades. Some of the areas in the temporary 12 miles (19 km) radius evacuation zone around Fukushima were found to be heavily contaminated with radionuclides, according to a survey released by the Japanese Ministry of Science and Education.

As of 2016, the government expects to gradually lift the designation of some "difficult-to-return zones," a total area of 337 square kilometres (130 sq mi), by 2021. Rain, wind, and natural dissipation have removed many radioactive contaminants, lowering levels at the central district of Okuma town to 9 mSv/year, one-fifth the level recorded in 2011.

However, according to UN reports, radiation leaks were small and did not cause any health damage to residents. Rushed evacuation of residents was criticized as not scientifically justified, driven by radiophobia and causing more harm than the incident itself.

=== Chernobyl disaster ===
Map showing Caesium-137 contamination in the Chernobyl area in 1996

As of 2013, the 1986 Chernobyl disaster in Ukraine remains the world's worst nuclear power plant disaster. Estimates of its death toll are controversial and range from 62 to 25,000, with the high projections including deaths that have yet to happen. Peer-reviewed publications have generally supported a projected total figure in the low tens of thousands. For example, an estimate of 16,000 excess cancer deaths are predicted to occur due to the Chernobyl accident out to the year 2065, whereas, in the same period, several hundred million cancer cases are expected from other causes. The IARC also stated in a press release: "To put it in perspective, tobacco smoking will cause several thousand times more cancers in the same population," but also, referring to the numbers of different types of cancers, "The exception is thyroid cancer, which, over ten years ago, was already shown to be increased in the most contaminated regions around the site of the accident." The full version of the World Health Organization health effects report adopted by the United Nations, also published in 2006, included the prediction of, in total, no more of 4,000 deaths from cancer. The Union of Concerned Scientists took issue with the report, and they, following the disputed linear no-threshold model (LNT) model of cancer susceptibility, instead estimated that the Chernobyl disaster would cause a total of 25,000 excess cancer deaths worldwide. That would place the total Chernobyl death toll below that of the worst dam failure accident in history, the Banqiao Dam disaster of 1975 in China.

Large amounts of radioactive contamination were spread across Europe due to the Chernobyl disaster; cesium and strontium contaminated many agricultural products, livestock, and soil. The accident necessitated the evacuation of the entire city of Pripyat and of 300,000 people from Kiev, rendering an area of land unusable by humans for an indeterminate period.

As radioactive materials decay, they release particles that can damage the body and lead to cancer, particularly cesium-137 and iodine-131. In the Chernobyl disaster, releases of cesium-137 contaminated land. Some communities, including the entire city of Pripyat, were abandoned indefinitely. One news source reported that thousands of people who drank milk contaminated with radioactive iodine developed thyroid cancer. The exclusion zone (approximately a 30 km radius around Chernobyl) may have significantly elevated levels of radiation, which is now predominantly due to the decay of cesium-137. This contamination is expected to last approximately 300 years.

Due to the bioaccumulation of cesium-137, some mushrooms as well as wild animals which eat them may have levels which are not considered safe for human consumption. Mandatory radiation testing of sheep in parts of the UK that graze on lands with contaminated peat was lifted in 2012.

In 2007, the Ukrainian government declared much of the Chernobyl Exclusion Zone, almost 490 square kilometres (190 sq mi), a zoological animal reserve. Many species of animals have experienced population increases since human influence has largely left the region, including moose, bison, and wolves. However, other species such as barn swallows and many invertebrates have diminished. There is much controversy among biologists over whether Chernobyl is now a wildlife reserve.

=== SL-1 meltdown ===
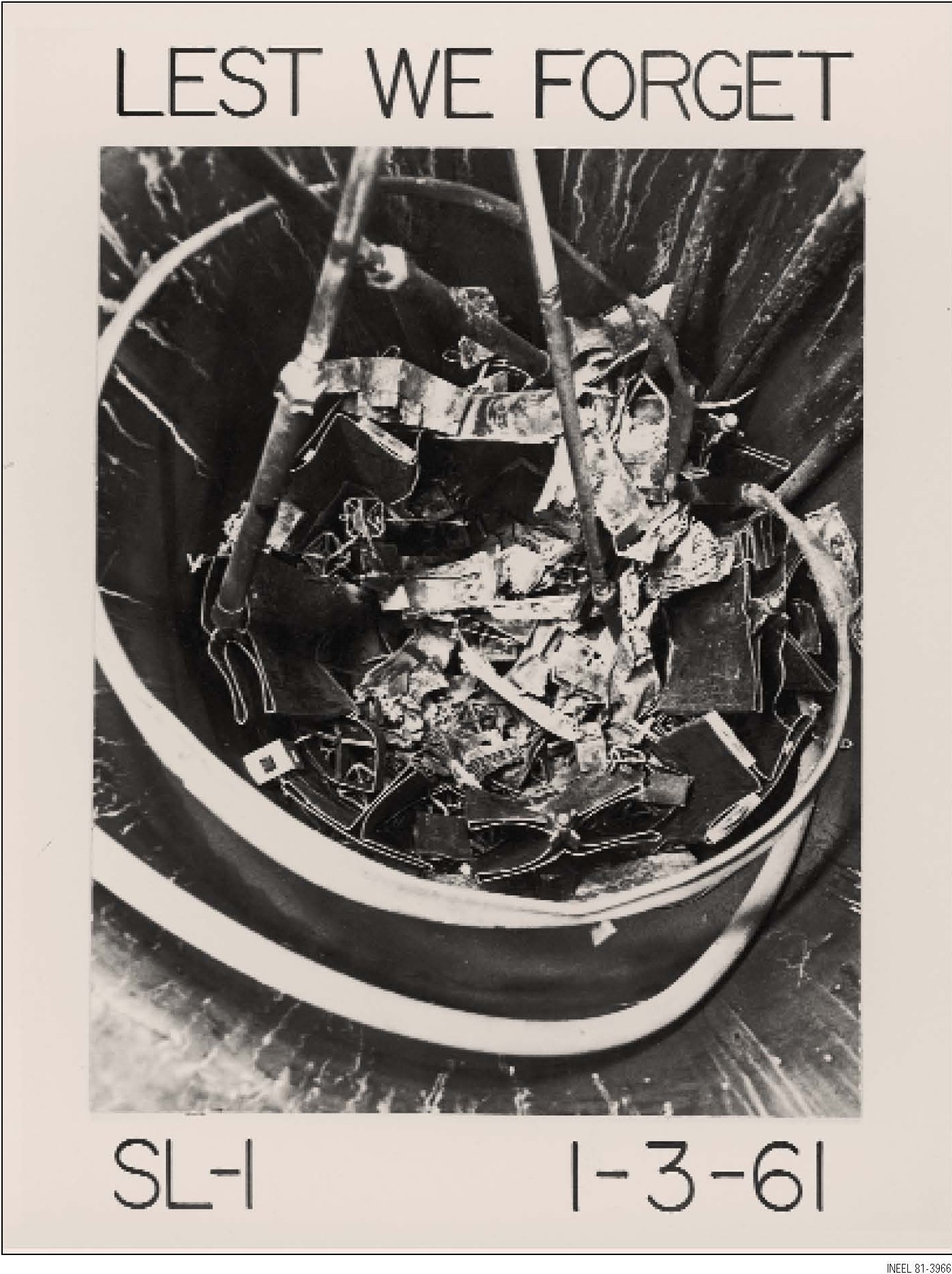
This image of the SL-1 core served as a sober reminder of the damage that a nuclear meltdown can cause.

The SL-1, or Stationary Low-Power Reactor Number One, was a United States Army experimental nuclear power reactor which underwent a steam explosion and meltdown on January 3, 1961, killing its three operators: John Byrnes, Richard McKinley, and Richard Legg. The direct cause was the improper manual withdrawal of the central control rod, which was responsible for absorbing neutrons in the reactor core. This caused the reactor power to surge to about 20,000MW and in turn, an explosion occurred. The event is the only known fatal reactor accident in the United States and the first to occur in the world. The accident released about 80 curies (3.0 TBq) of iodine-131, which was not considered significant due to its location in a remote desert of Idaho. About 1,100 curies (41 TBq) of fission products were released into the atmosphere.

Radiation exposure limits prior to the accident were 100 röntgens to save a life and 25 to save valuable property. During the response to the accident, 22 people received doses of 3 to 27 röntgens. Removal of radioactive waste and disposal of the three bodies eventually exposed 790 people to harmful levels of radiation. The hands of the initial victims were buried separately from their bodies because of their radiation levels.

=== Attacks and sabotage ===
Nuclear power plants, uranium enrichment plants, fuel fabrication plants, and even potentially uranium mines are vulnerable to attacks which could lead to widespread radioactive contamination. The attack threat is of several general types: commando-like ground-based attacks on equipment which, if disabled, could lead to a reactor core meltdown or widespread dispersal of radioactivity; and external attacks such as an aircraft crash into a reactor complex, or cyber attacks. Terrorists could target nuclear power plants in an attempt to release radioactive contamination into the environment and community.

Nuclear reactors become preferred targets during military conflict and have been repeatedly attacked by military air strikes:

- In September 1980, Iran bombed the incomplete Osirak reactor complex in Iraq.
- In June 1981, an Israeli air strike completely destroyed Iraq's Osirak reactor.
- Between 1984 and 1987, Iraq bombed Iran's incomplete Bushehr nuclear plant six times.
- In Iraq in 1991, the U.S. bombed three nuclear reactors and an enrichment pilot facility.

The United States 9/11 Commission said that nuclear power plants were potential targets originally considered for the September 11, 2001 attacks. If terrorist groups could sufficiently damage safety systems to cause a core meltdown at a nuclear power plant and/or sufficiently damage spent fuel pools, such an attack could lead to a widespread radioactive contamination. According to a 2004 report by the U.S. Congressional Budget Office, "The human, environmental, and economic costs from a successful attack on a nuclear power plant that results in the release of substantial quantities of radioactive material to the environment could be great." An attack on a reactor's spent fuel pool could also be serious, as these pools are less protected than the reactor core. The release of radioactivity could lead to thousands of near-term deaths and greater numbers of long-term fatalities.

Insider sabotage occurs because insiders can observe and work around security measures. In a study of insider crimes, the authors repeatedly said that successful insider crimes depended on the perpetrators' observation and knowledge of security vulnerabilities. Since the atomic age began, the U.S. Department of Energy's nuclear laboratories have been known for widespread violations of security rules. A better understanding of the scope of the insider threat will help to overcome complacency and is critical to getting countries to take stronger preventative measures.

Researchers have emphasized the need to make nuclear facilities extremely safe from sabotage and attacks that could release massive quantities of radioactivity. New reactor designs have passive safety features, such as automatic flooding of the reactor core without active intervention by reactor operators. These safety measures have generally been developed and studied with respect to accidents, not to deliberate reactor attacks by terrorist groups. However, the US Nuclear Regulatory Commission now requires new reactor license applications to consider security during the design stage.

== Natural disasters ==
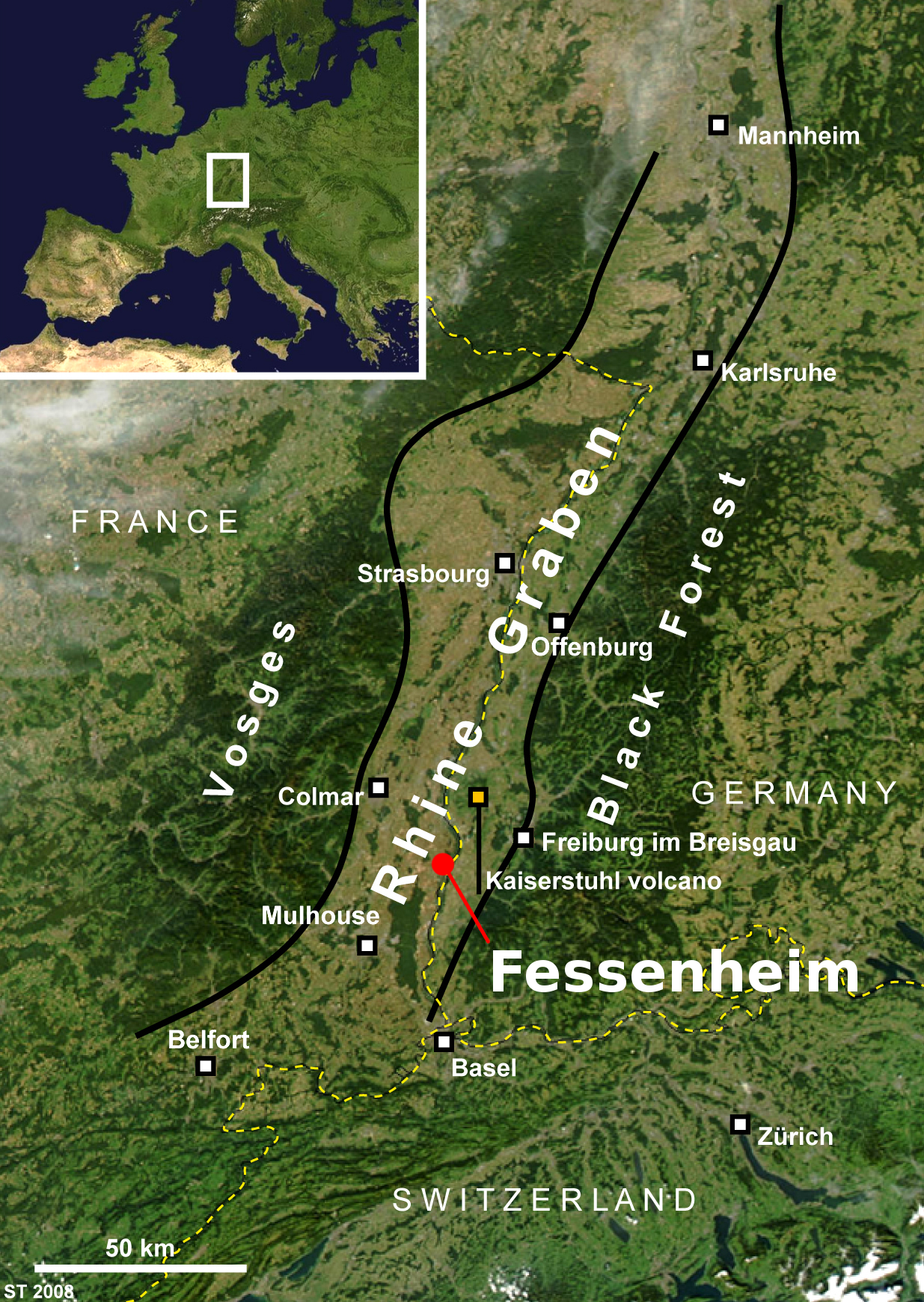
The location of the Fessenheim Nuclear Power Plant in the Rhine Rift Valley near the fault that caused the 1356 Basel earthquake is causing concern.

Following the 2011 Fukushima I nuclear accidents, there has been increased focus on the risks associated with seismic activity and the potential for environmental radioactive release. Genpatsu-shinsai, meaning nuclear power plant earthquake disaster, is a term coined by Japanese seismologist Professor Katsuhiko Ishibashi in 1997. It describes a domino effect scenario in which a major earthquake causes a severe accident at a nuclear power plant near a major population center, resulting in an uncontrollable release of radiation that make damage control and rescue impossible. In such a scenario, earthquake damage severely impedes the evacuation of the population. Ishibashi predicts that such an event would have a global impact seriously affecting future generations.

The 1999 Blayais Nuclear Power Plant flood was a flood that took place in France on the evening of December 27, 1999. It was caused when a combination of the tide and high winds from the extratropical storm Martin led to the plant's sea walls being overwhelmed. The event resulted in the loss of the plant's off-site power supply and knocked out several safety-related systems, resulting in a Level 2 event on the International Nuclear Event Scale. The incident illustrated the potential for flooding to damage nuclear plants, with the potential for radioactive release.

== Decommissioning ==
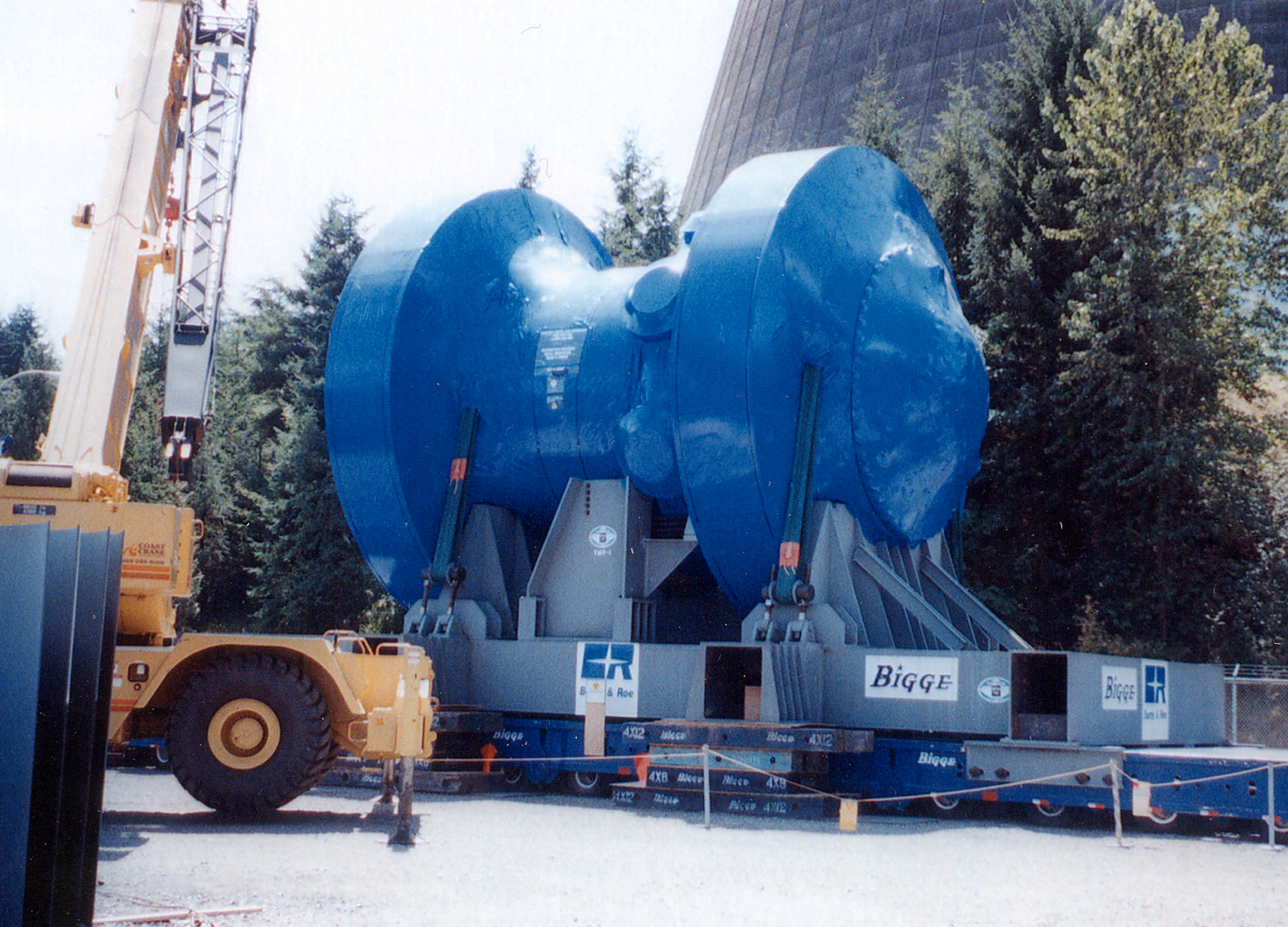
The reactor pressure vessel of the decommissioned Trojan Nuclear Power Plant being transported away from the site for burial. Images courtesy of the NRC.

Nuclear decommissioning is the process by which a nuclear power plant site is dismantled so that it will no longer require measures for radiation protection. The presence of radioactive material necessitates processes that are occupationally dangerous, hazardous to the local environment, expensive, and time-intensive.

Most nuclear plants currently operating in the US were originally designed for a life of about 30–40 years and are licensed to operate for 40 years by the US Nuclear Regulatory Commission. The average age of these reactors is 32 years. Therefore, many reactors are coming to the end of their licensing period. If their licenses are not renewed, the plants must go through a decontamination and decommissioning process. As of 2022 debate continues in many countries about how long their nuclear plants should run for, with some being shut-down earlier than expected when they were built and others having their lifetimes extended by decades.

Decommissioning is an administrative and technical process. It includes clean-up of radioactivity and progressive demolition of the plant. Once a facility is fully decommissioned, no danger of a radiologic nature should persist. The costs of decommissioning are to be spread over the lifetime of a facility and saved in a decommissioning fund. After a facility has been completely decommissioned, it is released from regulatory control, and the licensee of the plant will no longer be responsible for its nuclear safety. With some plants, the intent is to eventually return to "greenfield" status.

== See also ==
- Anti-nuclear movement
- Church Rock uranium mill spill
- Contesting the Future of Nuclear Power
- Ecological footprint
- Environmental impact of electricity generation
- Greenhouse Solutions with Sustainable Energy
- International Nuclear Event Scale
- List of books about nuclear issues
- Lists of nuclear disasters and radioactive incidents
- Non-Nuclear Futures
- Nuclear or Not?
- Nuclear Power and the Environment
- Plutonium in the environment
- Pro-nuclear movement
- Renewable energy commercialization
- The Clean Tech Revolution
- Three Mile Island accident health effects
- Waste Isolation Pilot Plant
