= Linner =

Linner may refer to:

- Linner (meal), a meal between lunch and dinner also known as lupper
- The Linner hue index, a measure for hues of caramel colourings
- Oscar Linnér (born 1997), Swedish professional footballer
- Rizling Linner, a variety of wine-making grape
- Björn-Ola Linnér (born 1963), Swedish climate policy scholar
