= Kristin Shrader-Frechette =

American philosopher

Kristin Shrader-Frechette (born 1944) is O'Neill Family Professor, Department of Biological Sciences and Department of Philosophy, at the University of Notre Dame. She has previously held senior professorships at the University of California and the University of Florida. Most of Shrader-Frechette's research work analyzes the ethical problems in risk assessment, public health, or environmental justice - especially those related to radiological, ecological, and energy-related risks.

Shrader-Frechette coined the phrase “ecological justice” more than 40 years ago, with the term changing to “environmental justice” over time. Among other things, "environmental injustice" references situations in which certain groups bear disproportionate environmental risks, have unequal access to goods like clean air or water, or have unequal voices in determining the imposition of environmental risks. Shrader-Frechette, who is considered one of the founders of the environmental justice movement, was also an early advocate of the concept of “intergenerational equity,” the idea that the environmental problems of future generations are also significant to the current generation.

Shrader-Frechette has received the Global Citizenship Award, and the Catholic Digest named her one of 12 "Heroes for the US and the World."

== Education ==
Kristin Shrader-Frechette studied physics at Xavier University and graduated (summa cum laude) in 1967. She received her Ph.D. in philosophy from the University of Notre Dame in 1972. Shrader-Frechette also did post-doctoral work relating to biology, economics, and hydrogeology.

== Publications ==
Shrader-Frechette has published more than 380 articles and 16 books/monographs, including Burying Uncertainty: Risk and the Case Against Geological Disposal of Nuclear Waste (1993); Method in Ecology (1993); The Ethics of Scientific Research (1994), Technology and Human Values (1996), Environmental Justice: Creating Equality, Reclaiming Democracy (2002), Taking Action, Saving Lives: Our Duties to Protect Environmental and Public Health (2007), and What Will Work: Fighting Climate Change with Renewable Energy, Not Nuclear Power (2011). Her books and articles have been translated into 13 languages. Shrader-Frechette is currently working on two new volumes: Risks of Risk Assessment and Philosophy of Science and Public Policy.

Shrader-Frechette's 2011 book What Will Work says that nuclear power is not an economic or practical technology:

This book uses market data, scientific studies, and ethical analyses to show why we should pursue green energy and conservation, and not nuclear fission, to address global climate change. Chapter 6 uses classic scientific studies from Harvard, Princeton, and the US Department of Energy to show how improved conservation and energy efficiency—along with increased use of wind and solar-PV power—can supply all energy needs while costing less than either fossil fuels or nuclear fission.

== Professional membership ==
Shrader-Frechette has been a member of many boards and committees at the international level. She has been invited to address the National Academies of Science in three different countries. She has served as an advisor to numerous governments and international organizations, including the United Nations and the World Health Organization. Associate Editor of BioScience until 2002, Shrader-Frechette is Editor-in-Chief of the Oxford University Press monograph series on Environmental Ethics and Science Policy and spent two terms on the US EPA Science Advisory Board. She also serves on the editorial boards of 22 professional journals.

== Awards ==
In 2004 Shrader-Frechette received the World Technology Award. In 2007, Catholic Digest named her one of 12 "Heroes for the US and the World" because of her pro-bono environmental justice work with minority and poor communities. In 2011, Tufts University gave her the Jean Mayer Global Citizenship Award. In 2023, she received the International Cosmos Prize, Japan for research and pro bono work on methods of quantitative risk assessment and stopping environmental injustice.

== See also ==
- Non-Nuclear Futures: The Case for an Ethical Energy Strategy
- Ruth Faden
- Inge Schmitz-Feuerhake
- Amory Lovins
- Benjamin K. Sovacool
- Mark Z. Jacobson
- Renewable energy commercialization
- 100% renewable energy
- Peter Frechette
- David Warren (director)
