= The Dirty Energy Dilemma =

2008 book by Benjamin K. Sovacool

- Author: Benjamin K. Sovacool
- Language: English
- Publisher: Praeger
- Publication date: 2008
- Publication place: America
- Media type: Print
- Pages: 320
- ISBN: 978-0313355400

The Dirty Energy Dilemma: What’s Blocking Clean Power in the United States is a 2008 book by academic Benjamin K. Sovacool, published by Praeger. In the book, Sovacool explores problems with the current U.S. electricity system and ways to overcome them.

== Synopsis ==
In the first part of the book, Sovacool explores the problems with the current system of large-scale electricity generation being used in the United States, powered by fossil fuels and nuclear power reactors. He identifies "The Big Four Energy Challenges" as rising fossil fuel costs, increasing pollution, inefficient and brittle transmission networks, as well as widespread system vulnerability to natural disasters, sabotage, and financial manipulations. "The Big Four Clean Solutions" of renewable energy, efficient energy use, distributed generation, and combined heat and power will do a better job of providing needed energy while protecting consumers and the planet.

Sovacool suggests that the barriers to clean energy adoption are institutional, not technological, and he sees no role for nuclear power in a clean energy transition.

== Award ==
The Dirty Energy Dilemma won a 2009 Nautilus Silver Award for Best Book in the "Ecology/Environment/Sustainability/Green Values" category.

== See also ==
- Alternative Energy: Political, Economic, and Social Feasibility
- Brittle Power
- Clean Edge
- Clean Energy Trends
- Greenhouse Solutions with Sustainable Energy
- The Clean Tech Revolution
