= Pasqualetti =

Pasqualetti is a surname. Notable people with the surname include:

- José Pasqualetti (born 1956), French football midfielder and manager
- Martin J. Pasqualetti, professor of geography at Arizona State University
