= Non-Nuclear Futures =

Book by Amory Lovins

- First edition
- Author: Amory Lovins; John H. Price
- Language: English
- Publisher: Friends of the Earth
- Publication date: 1975
- Publication place: United States
- Media type: Print
- Pages: 233
- ISBN: 0-88410-603-9

Non-Nuclear Futures: The Case for an Ethical Energy Strategy is a 1975 book by Amory B. Lovins and John H. Price. The main theme of the book is that the most important parts of the nuclear power debate are not technical disputes but relate to personal values, and are the legitimate province of every citizen, whether technically trained or not. Lovins and Price suggest that the personal values that make a high-energy society work are all too apparent, and that the values associated with an alternate view relate to thrift, simplicity, diversity, neighbourliness, craftsmanship, and humility. They also argue that large nuclear generators could not be mass-produced. Their centralization requires costly transmission and distribution systems. They are inefficient, not recycling excess thermal energy. The authors believed that nuclear reactors were less reliable (a grossly incorrect prediction) and take longer to build, exposing them to escalated interest costs, mistimed demand forecasts, and wage pressure by unions.

Lovins and Price suggest that these two different sets of personal values and technological attributes lead to two very different policy paths relating to future energy supplies. The first is high-energy nuclear, centralized, electric; the second is lower energy, non-nuclear, decentralized, less electrified, softer technology.

Subsequent publications by other authors which relate to the issue of non-nuclear energy paths are Greenhouse Solutions with Sustainable Energy, Plan B 2.0, Reaction Time, State of the World 2008, The Clean Tech Revolution, and the work of Benjamin K. Sovacool.

== See also ==
- Anti-nuclear movement in the United States
- Contesting the Future of Nuclear Power
- List of books about nuclear issues
- Nuclear energy policy
- Nuclear or Not?
- Nuclear-Free Future Award
- Nuclear-free zone
- Rocky Mountain Institute
- Kristin Shrader-Frechette
- Benjamin K. Sovacool.
