= Energy and American Society: Thirteen Myths =

2007 book edited by Benjamin K. Sovacool and Marilyn A. Brown

- Author: Benjamin K. Sovacool; Marilyn A. Brown
- Language: English
- Publication date: 2007

Energy and American Society: Thirteen Myths is a 2007 book about energy security and climate change, edited by Benjamin K. Sovacool and Marilyn A. Brown. The book is suitable for both technical and non-technical audiences since it is written in plain English and is "easily digested by anyone with a rudimentary background or interest in energy economics".

== Thirteen myths ==
The book discusses and presents counter-arguments to thirteen propositions concerning American culture, energy, the environment, and society:

- Myth One – Today's Energy Crisis is "Hype"
- Myth Two – The Public is Well Informed About Energy
- Myth Three – High Land Requirements and an Unfavorable Energy Balance Preclude Biomass Ethanol from Playing a Large Role in Providing Energy Services
- Myth Four – The Hydrogen Economy is a Panacea to the Nation's Energy Problems
- Myth Five – Price Signals are Insufficient to Induce Efficient Energy Investments
- Myth Six – The Barriers to New and Innovative Energy Technologies are Primarily Technical: The Case of Distributed Generation
- Myth Seven – Renewable Energy Systems Could Never Meet Growing Electricity Demand in America
- Myth Eight – Worldwide Power Systems are Economically and Environmentally Optimal
- Myth Nine – Energy Efficiency Improvements have Already Reached their Potential
- Myth Ten – Energy Efficiency Measures are Unreliable, Unpredictable, and Unenforceable
- Myth Eleven – Energy R&D Investment Takes Decades to Reach the Market
- Myth Twelve – Climate Policy will Bankrupt the U.S. Economy
- Myth Thirteen – Developing Countries are not Doing their Part in Responding to Concerns about Climate Change

== Contributors ==
The book was produced with support from Oak Ridge National Laboratory and involved 24 contributing authors with a diverse range of backgrounds. Notable contributors include Amory Lovins and Joseph Romm.

Benjamin K. Sovacool is a visiting associate professor at Vermont Law School and founding director of the Energy Justice Program at their Institute for Energy and Environment. He was formerly an assistant professor and research fellow at the National University of Singapore.

Marilyn A. Brown is an American geographer on the faculty of the Georgia Institute of Technology. She is a member of the National Commission on Energy Policy and the Tennessee Valley Authority board. She previously worked at Oak Ridge National Laboratory, where she held several leadership positions.

== Reviews ==
Energy and American Society: Thirteen Myths has been reviewed in Energy Policy and the Annals of the Association of American Geographers.

== See also ==
- Alternative Energy: Political, Economic, and Social Feasibility
- Clean Energy Trends
- Clean Tech Nation
- Greenhouse Solutions with Sustainable Energy
