= Marilyn A. Brown =

American geographer

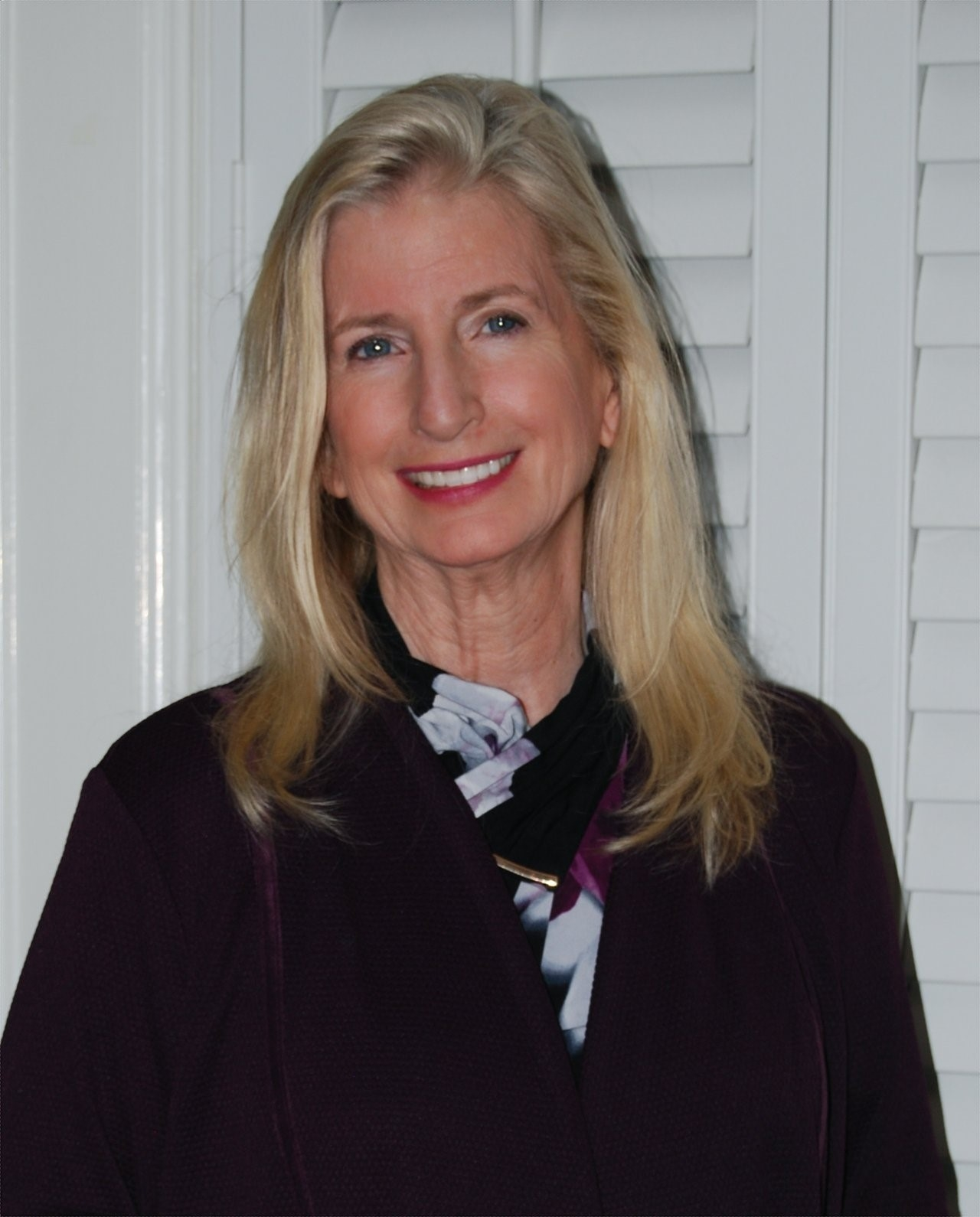
- Education: Ohio State University; University of Massachusetts; Rutgers University
- Organizations: Georgia Institute of Technology; Oak Ridge National Laboratory
- Notable work: IPCC Assessment Reports 3(2001), 4(2007), 5(2013); Scenarios of U.S. carbon reductions; Carbon footprint of cities; "Energy-efficiency gap"; Utility regulator; Editor, Energy Policy

Marilyn A. Brown is a Regents' and Brook Byers Professor of Sustainable Systems in the School of Public Policy at the Georgia Institute of Technology. She joined Georgia Tech in 2006 after 22 years at Oak Ridge National Laboratory, where she held various leadership positions. Her work was cited by President Clinton as providing the scientific justification for signing the 1997 Kyoto Protocol. With Eric Hirst, she coined the term "energy efficiency gap" and pioneered research to highlight and quantify the unexploited economic potential to use energy more productively.

Brown was elected to both the National Academy of Engineering and the National Academy of Sciences in 2020 for bridging engineering, social and behavioral sciences, and policy studies to achieve cleaner and more resilient electric power and more affordable and equitable energy services. In 2023 she was elected to the American Academy of Arts and Sciences. Few scientists belong to all three of these prestigious institutions. She also received the Anderson Medal of Honor in Applied Geography from the American Association of Geographers in 2004.

== Career ==
At Georgia Tech, Brown leads the Climate and Energy Policy Lab and created the Master of Sustainable Energy and Environmental Management in the School of Public Policy. These initiatives focus on clean energy policies and trends in the U.S., and they span the triad of climate mitigation, climate adaptation, and geo-engineering. CEPL is distinct in its analysis of climate change and energy policies using the National Energy Modeling System (NEMS) and other modeling platforms.

Brown led Scenarios of U.S. Carbon Reductions: The Potential Impact of Energy-Efficient and Low-Carbon Technologies. From 2010 to 2018 she was appointed by President Barack Obama to two terms on the Board of Directors of the Tennessee Valley Authority. During her 8 years as a regulator, TVA reduced its CO_{2} emissions by 50%, brought a new nuclear reactor on line, and modeled energy efficiency as a virtual power plant (VPP) in its integrated resource planning. For her VPP research she received the 2019 Charles H. Percy Award for Public Service, given by the Alliance to Save Energy. In 2022, Brown received the Class of 1934 Distinguished Professor Award, the highest honor that can be given to a Georgia Tech Professor. She received the World Citizen Prizes in Environmental Performance Award by the Association for Public Policy Analysis and Management (APPAM) in 2021. In addition, Brown was elected into the American Academy of Arts & Sciences in 2023.

Brown co-founded the Southeast Energy Efficiency Alliance and chaired its first board of directors. She has served on the boards of the American Council for an Energy-Efficient Economy, the Alliance to Save Energy, and the Bipartisan Policy Center. She co-chaired the National Academies of Sciences, Engineering and Medicine Committee on America's Climate Futures and has served on seven other NASEM committees, is an Editor of Energy Policy, and serves on the Editorial Boards of Energy Efficiency and Energy Research & Social Science. She served on the Electricity Advisory Committee of the United States Department of Energy from 2015 to 2018) and chaired its Smart Grid Subcommittee.

== Education ==
Brown received her Bachelor of Arts from Rutgers University in political science and a minor in mathematics in 1971. In 1973, she earned her master's degree from the University of Massachusetts Amherst in resource planning. In 1977, she obtained her Ph.D. from Ohio State University in geography with a minor in quantitative methods. She is a certified energy manager with the Association of Energy Engineers.

== Publications ==
Brown's books on clean energy policy, technology, behavior, and economics include:

- Empowering the Great Energy Transition, Columbia University Press, 2019. ISBN 978-0-2311-8596-7
- Fact and Fiction in Global Energy Policy: Fifteen Contentious Questions, Johns Hopkins University Press. 2016. ISBN 978-1-4214-1897-1
- Green Savings: How Policy and Markets Drive Energy Efficiency, Praeger. 2015. ISBN 978-1-4408-3120-1
- Climate Change and Global Energy Security, MIT Press, 2011. ISBN 978-0-2625-1631-0
- Shrinking the carbon footprint of metropolitan America, Washington, DC: Brookings Institution, 2008.
- Energy and American Society: Thirteen Myths, Springer Press, 2007. ISBN 978-1-4020-5563-8

Brown's work has also been published in top policy and sustainability related journals, such as Proceedings of the National Academy of Sciences (PNAS), Science, Nature Energy, Energy Policy, Applied Energy, Environmental Science & Technology, Journal of Cleaner Production, Policy and Society, Renewable Energy, Ecological Economics, Research Policy, Global Environmental Change, Energy Efficiency, Climatic Change, Energy Research & Social Science, Resources, Conservation and Recycling, The Electricity Journal, and Environmental Research Letters. Some examples include:

- Brown, Marilyn A., et al. (2021). “A Framework for Localizing Global Climate Solutions and their Carbon Reduction Potential,” Proceedings of the National Academy of Sciences, 118 (31);
- Brown, M. A., Soni, A., Doshi, A. D., & King, C. (2020). "The persistence of high energy burdens: A bibliometric analysis of vulnerability, poverty, and exclusion in the United States". Energy research & social science, 70, 101756; [https://doi.org/10.1016/j.erss.2020.101756
- Brown, M. A., Wang, Y., Sovacool, B. K., & D’Agostino, A. L. (2014). "Forty years of energy security trends: A comparative assessment of 22 industrialized countries". Energy Research & Social Science, 4, 64-77; [https://doi.org/10.1016/j.erss.2014.08.008
- Brown, M. A. (2001). "Market failures and barriers as a basis for clean energy policies." Energy policy, 29(14), 1197-1207;

== See also ==
- Amory Lovins
- Benjamin K. Sovacool
- Efficient energy use
- Martin J. Pasqualetti
- Renewable energy policy
