= Climate Change and Global Energy Security =

2011 book by Marilyn A. Brown

- Author: Marilyn A. Brown; Benjamin K. Sovacool
- Subject: Climate change mitigation, energy security
- Publisher: MIT Press
- Publication date: 2011
- Pages: 416 pp.
- ISBN: 978-0-262-01625-4
- OCLC: 702647425

Climate Change and Global Energy Security: Technology and Policy Options is a 2011 book by Marilyn A. Brown and Benjamin K. Sovacool, in which the authors offer detailed assessments of commercially available technologies for strengthening global energy security and climate change mitigation. They also evaluate the barriers to the deployment of these technologies and critically review public policy options for their commercialization. Arguing that society has all the technologies necessary for the task, they discuss an array of options available today, including high-efficiency transportation, renewable energy, carbon sequestration, and demand side management.

== See also ==
- List of books about renewable energy
- List of books about energy issues
- Renewable energy commercialization
- Renewable energy policy
- Sustainable business
- Life-cycle greenhouse-gas emissions of energy sources
