= Ten Technologies to Fix Energy and Climate =

2008 book by Chris Goodall

- First edition
- Author: Chris Goodall
- Original title: Ten Technologies to Save the Planet
- Cover artist: N/A (artpartner-images.com)
- Language: English
- Subject: Global warming, Climate change
- Genre: Popular science
- Publisher: Profile Books
- Publication date: 13 November 2008
- Publication place: United Kingdom
- Media type: Print (Paperback)
- Pages: 292 pp (UK paperback edition)
- ISBN: 978-1-84668-868-3
- OCLC: 237176788
- Dewey Decimal: 363.738746 22
- LC Class: TD885.5.G73 G66 2008

Ten Technologies to Fix Energy and Climate (second edition, 2009) or Ten Technologies to Save the Planet (first edition, 2008) is a popular science book by Chris Goodall first published in 2008 and re-issued in 2009 by Profile Books. Its ten chapters each detail a technology that has the potential to reduce greenhouse gases while being economically and technologically viable in the present or near future. The book received a positive critical response for the way in which it was written and dealt with the issues surrounding global warming.

== Overview ==
The book is divided into ten chapters which deal with a different technology (although there was some contention, as raised by the author, with the 'Soils and Forests' Chapter). Typically every chapter covers the advantages, disadvantages and viability (economically and technologically) of the technology. Goodall doesn’t cover nuclear power as he believes that it doesn’t have a potential to become far cheaper. Goodall states that we already have inexpensive technologies that don’t require us to abandon our ways of life, but they do require some reorganisation of our economies. His point of view is that none of these technologies alone could supply all the world’s energy needs, but a portfolio of them, can.

With regards to wind power, Goodall argues that since the technology to utilise wind efficiently exists currently and there are sufficient sites to supply the world's energy demands ("72 terawatts - around thirty times the world's electricity requirements"), the main obstacle is reliability.

Efficiency of current photovoltaic panels (typically 10%) and the cost (of silicon) are identified as the only remaining problems in rolling out large solar powerplants in places such as North Africa, the Sahara Desert and California, Goodall concludes in the solar energy chapter.

Goodall identifies the Pentland Firth as one of twenty global sites that promise 'enormous potential' with tidal-stream power. Cited as the main reason for continued failure to harness the Ocean's 'enormous untapped potential' is a lack of funding, driven by competition in R&D and a lack of interest; although Goodall is optimistic and admits there have been improvements.

Efficient fuel cells applied to domestic homes, the author suggests, may be capable of simultaneously providing hot water, heating and profiting the owner with exports to the local grid. Also discussed are district heating plants, which are widespread in Denmark, able to provide heat to towns and produce electricity.

The Introduction explains how the author came to write about the subject. A section called 'Putting it all Together' looks at if the aforementioned ten technologies have the combined potential to 'save the planet'.

Finally the Epilogue reveals the reasoning behind why some technologies (e.g. nuclear energy) are not included and may not work.

== Critical reception ==
Ten Technologies to Save the Planet has received a positive critical response; Mark Lynas, an environmentalist and author of Six Degrees: Our Future on a Hotter Planet, said "Ten Technologies is superb - it cuts like lightning through the myths and muddled thinking surrounding energy issues. It is vital, topical and brilliantly written." BBC Green, said the book was "Rewarding and essential, Ten Technologies combines rigorous research and an accessible tone."

== See also ==
- The Clean Tech Revolution
- List of books about energy issues
- Surviving the Century: Facing Climate Chaos and Other Global Challenges
- Greenhouse Solutions with Sustainable Energy
