= David Elliott (professor) =

- Scientific career
- Fields: Technology policy
- Institutions: Open University

David Elliott is Professor of Technology Policy at the Open University. He has created several courses in Design and Innovation, with special emphasis on how the innovation development process can be directed towards sustainable technologies. Elliott's main research interests include the development of sustainable energy technologies, particularly renewable energy systems.

== Selected publications ==
- Nuclear or Not? Does nuclear power have a place in a sustainable energy future?, Palgrave, 2007.
- Sustainable Energy: Opportunities and Limitations, Palgrave, 2007.
- "Energy Regime Choices: Nuclear or Not?", Technology Analysis & Strategic Management, Vol. 18, No. 5, 1–6, December 2006.
- "Comparing Support for Renewable Power" in V Lauber (ed) Switching to Renewable Power, Earthscan, pp 219–227, 2005, ISBN 1-902916-65-4
- 'Fukushima: impacts and implications', Palgrave Macmillan, 2012
- 'Renewables: A review of sustainable energy', supply options Institute of Physics, 2013
- 'Green Energy Futures', Palgrave Pivot e-book, 2015
- 'Balancing Green Power', Institute of Physics, 2016
- 'Nuclear Power: past, present and future', Institute of Physics, 2017
- 'Renewable Energy: from Europe to Africa', Palgrave pivot, with T.Cook, 2018
- 'Renewable Energy: past, present and future'. Palgrave, 2019
- Web link to Blogs and Renew newsletter:

https://renewnatta.wordpress.com

== See also ==
- Andy Stirling
- Stephen Thomas (economist)
- Gordon Walker (professor)
