= Björn-Ola Linnér =

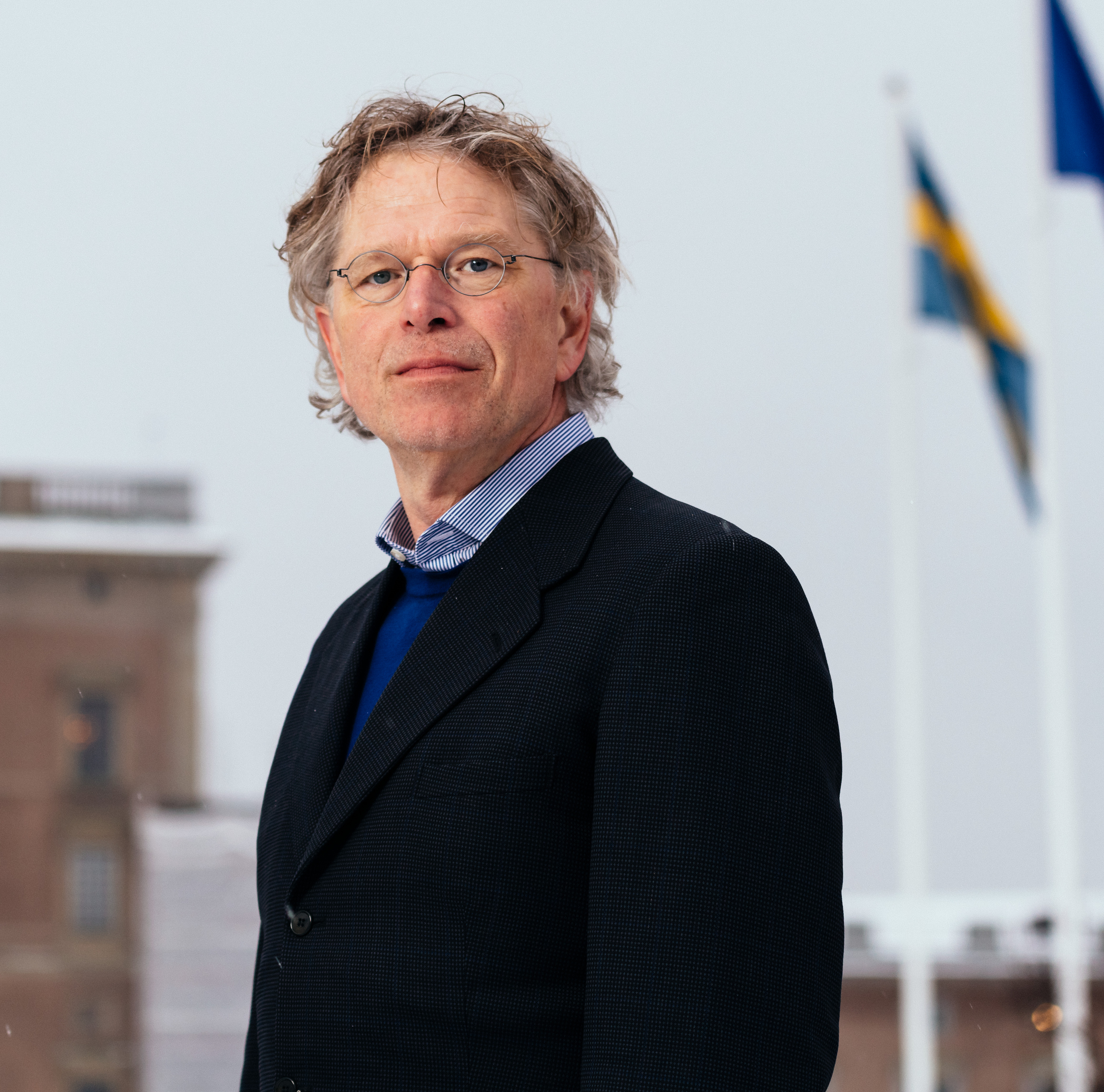
- Björn-Ola Linnér outside the Swedish Parliament 2018. Photo by David Brohede.
- Born: 1963 (age 62–63); Gothenburg, Sweden

Academic background
- Education: Lund University, Sweden

Academic work
- Main interests: Climate policy

Björn-Ola Linnér (born 1963) is a Swedish climate policy scholar and professor at Linköping University. He is program director of Mistra Geopolitics, a research programme that critically examines and explores the interplay between the dynamics of geopolitics, human security, and global environmental change. He is also affiliated at the Institute for Science, Innovation and Society at Oxford University and the Stockholm Environment Institute.

== Biography ==
Linnér was born in 1963, Sweden. He received a PhD degree in 1998 on the dissertation The world household: Georg Borgström and the postwar population–resource crisis., which was later reworked into the book The Return of Malthus: Environmentalism and Postwar Population–Resource Crises, where he analyses neo-Malthusianism in conservationism, environmentalism and in international politics in the 20th century. In 2008, he was appointed professor at the Department of Thematic Studies – Environmental Change at Linköping University.

Linnér is currently program director of Mistra Geopolitics, a research programme that critically examines and explores the interplay between the dynamics of geopolitics, human security, and global environmental change. He is also affiliated as a researcher at the Institute for Science, Innovation and Society at Oxford University, the Stockholm Environment Institute, and the Stockholm International Peace Research Institute.

Linnér's climate policy research focuses on societal transformations to sustainability, linkages between climate and sustainable development policy, international climate governance and tools for climate visualization.

He is associate editor of the Oxford research encyclopedia of climate science.

He is advisor to international organisations, ministries and agencies as well as industry and civil society organisations. He has been scientific expert in the Swedish delegation to negotiations of the Synthesis Report of the Intergovernmental Panel on Climate Change and the Intergovernmental Science-Policy Platform on Biodiversity and Ecosystem Services (IPBES). He held the Research and Independent NGO constituency's address at the High-level segment of UNFCCC Conference (Copenhagen 2009). He is a fellow of the Royal Swedish Academy of Agriculture and Forestry and a lead author of the IPBES' assessment report on Transformative Change.

Linnér is frequently engaged in public debate on international climate policy.

== Selected bibliography ==
Books

- Björn-Ola Linnér. The Return of Malthus: Environmentalism and Postwar Population–Resource Crises 2nd revised edition (Whitehorse Press; 2023)
- Björn-Ola Linnér, Victoria Wibeck. Sustainability Transformations: Agents and Drivers across Societies (Cambridge University Press; 2019) (ISBN 9781108766975)
- Benjamin Sovacool, Björn-Ola Linnér. The Political Economy of Climate Adaptation (Palgrave Macmillan; 2015)

Articles

- Karin Bäckstrand, Jonathan Kuyper, Björn-Ola Linnér, Eva Lövbrand (2017) Non-state actors in global climate governance: from Copenhagen to Paris and beyond. ''Environmental Politics'' (journal) 26, 561-579 doi:10.1080/09644016.2017.1327485
- Sirkku Juhola, Erik Glaas, Björn-Ola Linnér, Tina Neset (2016). Redefining maladaptation. Environmental Science & Policy. 55,135-40 doi:10.1016/j.envsci.2015.09.014
- Christer Karlsson, Charles Parker, Mattias Hjerpe, Björn-Ola Linnér (2011). Looking for leaders: Perceptions of climate change leadership among climate change negotiation participants. Global Environmental Politics 11, 89–107 doi:10.1162/GLEP_a_00044
- Benjamin Sovacool, Björn-Ola Linnér, Michael Goodsite (2015). The political economy of climate adaptation. Nature Climate Change, 2015. 5, 616-618. doi:10.1038/nclimate2665
