= Energy Research & Social Science =

- Discipline: Social sciences, energy systems, energy policy
- Language: English
- Edited by: Benjamin K. Sovacool

Publication details
- History: 2014-present
- Publisher: Elsevier
- Frequency: Monthly

Standard abbreviations
- ISO 4: Energy Res. Soc. Sci.

Indexing
- ISSN: 2214-6296
- LCCN: 2014205258
- OCLC no.: 889252485

Links
- Journal homepage; Online archive

Energy Research & Social Science is a peer-reviewed academic journal covering social science research on energy systems and energy and society, including anthropology, economics, geography, psychology, political science, social policy, sociology, science and technology studies and legal studies. It was established in 2014 and is now among the most highly ranked journals on energy and social sciences. It is published by Elsevier. The editor-in-chief is Benjamin K. Sovacool (Aarhus University and University of Sussex).

== Abstracting and indexing ==
The journal is abstracted and indexed in:

- Social Sciences Citation Index
- Scopus

== See also ==
- Climate change adaptation
- Climate change mitigation
- Energy policy
- Renewable energy
