= Martin J. Pasqualetti =

American geographer

Martin J. "Mike" Pasqualetti is a professor of geography in the School of Geographical Sciences and Urban Planning at Arizona State University in Tempe, Arizona. He is also a member of the graduate faculty on Global Technology and Development at ASU Polytechnic, and a Senior Sustainability Scholar the Global Institute of Sustainability. He pioneered the study of "Energy Landscapes," which interprets the role of human energy demand in reshaping natural landscapes.

== Education ==
B.A. in Geography from the University of California, Berkeley 1967

M.A. in Geography and Anthropology from the Louisiana State University, Baton Rouge 1969. Thesis: "The Fishing Economy of Lake Chapala, Mexico"

Ph.D. in Geography and Energy from the University of California, Riverside 1977. Dissertation: "Energy in An Oasis: Geothermal Energy in the Imperial Valley of California"

== Public service ==
He was appointed twice by two different Arizona governors as chair of the Arizona Solar Energy Advisory Council. He is regarded as an expert on renewable energy and energy ties between the United States and Mexico. He was an appointed member of the Arizona Board of Geographic and Historic Names, leading the successful effort to change the name of a Phoenix landmark from Squaw Peak to Piestewa Peak in honor of Lori Piestewa, the first Native American women to be killed in action.

== Publications ==
Dr. Pasqualetti has published books on wind power, nuclear power plant decommissioning, nuclear energy hazards, landscape development, and 75 articles on energy and other topics, including solar energy, wind energy, geothermal energy, nuclear energy, oil sands, energy security, and energy landscapes. The following is a selection of his published work:

=== Books ===
- The Thread of Energy. Oxford University Press
- Energy Democracies for Sustainable Futures, Elsevier
- The Renewable Energy Landscape. Routledge
- Routledge Handbook of Energy Transitions, Routledge
- Nuclear Power: Assessing and Managing Hazardous Technology, editor and contributor (with K. David Pijawka) and contributor. Westview Press. 1984
- Nuclear Decommissioning and Society, editor and contributor. Routledge Press. 1990.
- The Evolving Landscape: Homer Aschmann's Geography, editor and contributor. Johns Hopkins University Press. 1997
- Wind Power in View: Landscapes of Power in a Crowded World, editor and contributor (with Paul Gipe and Robert Righter). Academic Press. 2002
