= Contesting the Future of Nuclear Power =

2011 book by Benjamin K. Sovacool

- Author: Benjamin K. Sovacool
- Subject: Nuclear power
- Publisher: World Scientific
- Publication date: 2011
- Pages: 296
- ISBN: 978-981-4322-75-1
- OCLC: 741924362

Contesting the Future of Nuclear Power: A Critical Global Assessment of Atomic Energy is a 2011 book by Benjamin K. Sovacool, published by World Scientific. Sovacool's book addresses the current status of the global nuclear power industry, its fuel cycle, nuclear accidents, environmental impacts, social risks, energy payback, nuclear power economics, and industry subsidies. There is a postscript on the Japanese 2011 Fukushima nuclear disaster. Based on detailed analysis, Sovacool concludes "that a global nuclear renaissance would bring immense technical, economic, environmental, political, and social costs". He says that it is renewable energy technologies which will enhance energy security, and which have many other advantages.

The book says the marginal levelized cost for "a 1,000-MWe facility built in 2009 would be 41.2 to 80.3 cents/kWh, presuming one actually takes into account construction, operation and fuel, reprocessing, waste storage, and decommissioning."

In a review by author Mark Diesendorf the book "reviews the little-known research which shows that the life-cycle CO2 emissions of nuclear power may become comparable with those of fossil power as high-grade uranium ore is used up over the next several decades and low-grade uranium is mined and milled using fossil fuels". Diesendorf says that one weakness of the book is the limited coverage of nuclear weapons proliferation. He says that governments of several countries (e.g., France, India, North Korea, Pakistan) have used nuclear power and/or research reactors to assist nuclear weapons development or to contribute to their supplies of nuclear explosives from military reactors.

== See also ==
- List of books about nuclear issues
- List of books about renewable energy
- Nuclear or Not?
- Reaction Time (book)
- Non-Nuclear Futures
