= Nuclear or Not? =

2007 book edited by Professor David Elliott

Nuclear or Not? Does Nuclear Power Have a Place in a Sustainable Energy Future?
- Author: David Elliott
- Publisher: Palgrave Macmillan
- Publication date: 2007
- ISBN: 978-0-230-50764-7
- OCLC: 71812857
- Dewey Decimal: 333.792/40941 22
- LC Class: HD9698.G72 N84 2007

Nuclear or Not? Does Nuclear Power Have a Place in a Sustainable Energy Future? is a 2007 book edited by Professor David Elliott. The book offers various views and perspectives on nuclear power. Authors include:

- Paul Allen from the Centre for Alternative Technology
- Dr Ian Fairlie, who served on the Committee Examining Radiation Risks of Internal Emitters (CERRIE)
- Stephen Kidd of the World Nuclear Association

Professor Elliott calls for continued debate on the nuclear power issue. He has worked with the United Kingdom Atomic Energy Authority before moving to the Open University where he is Professor of Technology Policy and has developed courses on technological innovation, focusing in particular on renewable energy technology.

== See also ==
- List of books about nuclear issues
- Nuclear Power and the Environment
- Reaction Time
- Contesting the Future of Nuclear Power
- Non-Nuclear Futures
