= Alternative Energy: Political, Economic, and Social Feasibility =

2006 book by Christopher A. Simon

- Author: Christopher A. Simon
- Language: English
- Subject: Alternative Energy
- Publisher: Rowman & Littlefield, Lanham, Maryland, 2006
- Publication date: December 28, 2006
- Publication place: United States
- Pages: 250
- ISBN: 0-7425-4908-9 ISBN 978-0-7425-4908-1, ISBN 0-7425-4909-7, ISBN 978-0-7425-4909-8
- OCLC: 70884975
- Dewey Decimal: 333.79/4 22
- LC Class: HD9502.U52 S544 2007

Alternative Energy: Political, Economic, and Social Feasibility (Lanham, Maryland: Rowman & Littlefield, 2006. ISBN 0-7425-4909-7) is a 2006 book by Christopher A. Simon that discusses the transition from fossil fuels to renewable energy. The book has been called a "sophisticated, insightful, and well written book on the current global push to adopt varying forms of alternative energy, from wind to solar, geothermal, hydrogen, and beyond". The book is held in the collection of East Carolina University Libraries.

== Review ==
A review in Washington State Magazine described the book as a clear and insightful examination of the political, economic and social challenges involved in adopting alternative energy.
