= Benjamin K. Sovacool =

American academic

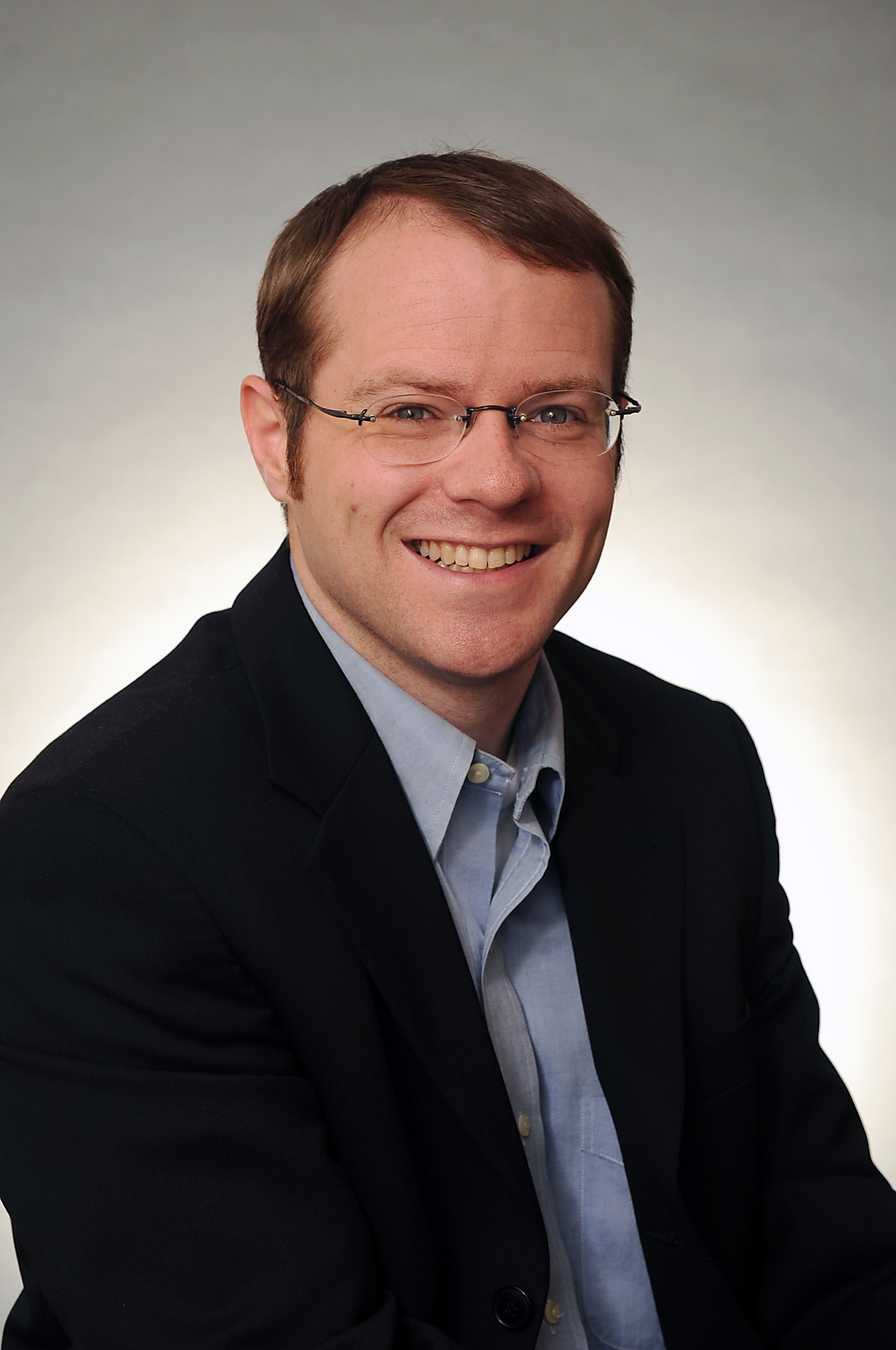
- Benjamin K. Sovacool, May 2010
- Education: John Carroll University
- Known for: Energy policy; IPCC AR5 report
- Awards: Dedication to Diversity and Justice Award (2015)
- Scientific career
- Workplaces: Aarhus University; University of Sussex; Boston University

Benjamin K. Sovacool is an American and British academic who is Professor of Earth and Environment at Boston University. He was formerly director of the Institute for Global Sustainability at Boston University as well as formerly Director of the Danish Center for Energy Technology at the Department of Business Development and Technology and a professor of social sciences at Aarhus University. He is also professor of energy policy at the University of Sussex, where he formerly directed the Center on Innovation and Energy Demand and the Sussex Energy Group. He has written on energy policy, environmental issues, and science and technology policy. Sovacool is also the editor-in-chief of Energy Research & Social Science.

== Education ==
Sovacool has a bachelor's degree in Philosophy and Communication Studies (2001) from John Carroll University, master's degrees in Rhetoric (2003) from Wayne State University and in Science Policy (2005) Virginia Tech, and a PhD (2006) in Science and Technology Studies from Virginia Tech.

== Career ==
While at Virginia Tech, Sovacool worked as a graduate student on a grant from the National Science Foundation's Electric Power Networks Efficiency and Security Program analyzing the barriers to small-scale renewable electricity sources and distributed generation in the United States. He worked in research and advisory capacities for the New York State Energy Research and Development Authority, Semiconductor Materials and Equipment International, the Global Environment Facility, the World Bank Group, and the Union of Concerned Scientists.

From 2007 until 2011 Sovacool was at the National University of Singapore, where he led research projects supported by the MacArthur Foundation and the Rockefeller Foundation investigating how to improve energy security for impoverished rural communities throughout Asia.

Sovacool was an associate professor at Vermont Law School and founded their Energy Security & Justice Program in 2011. In 2012, Sovacool was an Erasmus Mundus Visiting Scholar at Central European University in Hungary. He consulted for the Asian Development Bank, United Nations Development Program, and United Nations Economic and Social Commission for Asia and the Pacific. He was awarded the Dedication to Diversity and Justice Award from the American Bar Association in 2015.

In 2013, Sovacool was Director of the Center for Energy Technology and professor of business and social sciences at Aarhus University in Denmark. He is also Professor of Energy Policy at the University of Sussex in the United Kingdom. Sovacool lectures on energy security, alternative and renewable energy, environmental economics, and energy policy.

In 2014, Sovacool became the founding editor-in-chief of Energy Research & Social Science, which explores the interactions between energy systems and society.

== Publications ==
Sovacool has authored numerous academic articles and book chapters and has written opinion editorials for The Wall Street Journal and the San Francisco Chronicle. According to Google Scholar his scientific publication has (as of September 2022) an h-index of 113.

In 2007, Sovacool co-edited Energy and American Society: Thirteen Myths. In 2008, he wrote The Dirty Energy Dilemma: What’s Blocking Clean Power in the United States which was published by Praeger and won a 2009 Nautilus Book Award.

In Contesting the Future of Nuclear Power (2011) Sovacool says, following a detailed analysis, that there is a "consensus among a broad base of independent, nonpartisan experts that nuclear power plants are a poor choice for producing electricity", and that "energy efficiency programs and renewable power technologies are better than nuclear power plants". In 2016, Sovacool, Andrew Lawrence and Andrew Stirling published an article in Climate Policy claiming that pro-nuclear energy countries had acted more slowly to address climate change. Critics pointed out errors in the data the article was based on, and the authors retracted it, as the two errors "had the combined effect of invalidating key findings of this paper".

In October 2020, Sovacool and Stirling published another article in Nature Energy analysing data from 123 countries over 25 years that again argues that pro-nuclear countries do not show significantly lower carbon emissions, and that in poorer countries nuclear programmes are associated with relatively higher carbon emissions. The results have been disputed in two publications. Harrison Fell et al. analyzed the same data as Sovacool did, finding that "nuclear power and renewable energy are both associated with lower per capita CO2 emissions with effects of similar magnitude", and pointing out bias and basic statistical fallacies in the Sovacool publication - for example, arbitrarily choosing 1990-2004 and 2000-2014 periods for their analysis, incorrectly accepting their null hypothesis when their analysis did not achieve statistical significance and other such issues. Friedrich Wagner investigated the CO_{2} emissions caused by nuclear and renewable power. His "results are in complete contradiction" with the Sovacool study. Sovacool and colleagues have challenged such publications, with a rebuttal in Nature Energy noting that "rather than finding any critical flaws in our analysis," such studies instead "have only effectively confirmed our own basis for raising critical questions about the assumptions of parity in the carbon reducing effects of nuclear and renewable strategies."

=== Books ===
- Sovacool, BK and MA Brown (Eds.) Energy and American Society: Thirteen Myths (New York: Springer, 2007)
- Sovacool, BK. The Dirty Energy Dilemma: What’s Blocking Clean Power in the United States (Westport, CT: Praeger, 2008)
- Mendonça, M, D Jacobs, and BK Sovacool. Powering the Green Economy: The Feed-In Tariff Handbook, (London: Earthscan, 2009)
- Sovacool, BK (Ed.) Routledge Handbook of Energy Security (London: Routledge, 2010)
- Sovacool, BK. Contesting the Future of Nuclear Power: A Critical Global Assessment of Atomic Energy (London: World Scientific, 2011)
- Brown, MA and BK Sovacool. Climate Change and Global Energy Security: Technology and Policy Options (Cambridge: MIT Press, 2011)
- Sovacool, BK and SV Valentine. The National Politics of Nuclear Power: Economics, Security, and Governance (London: Routledge, 2012)
- Sovacool, BK and IM Drupady. Energy Access, Poverty, and Development: The Governance of Small-Scale Renewable Energy in Developing Asia (New York: Ashgate, 2012)
- Sovacool, BK and CJ Cooper. The Governance of Energy Megaprojects: Politics, Hubris, and Energy Security (London: Edward Elgar, 2013)
- Sovacool, BK. Energy & Ethics: Justice and the Global Energy Challenge (New York: Palgrave MacMillan, 2013)
- Sovacool, BK, R Sidortsov, and B Jones. Energy Security, Equality and Justice (London: Routledge, 2013)
- Halff, Antoine, J Rozhon and BK Sovacool (Eds.). Energy Poverty: Global Challenges and Local Solutions (Oxford: Oxford University Press, 2014)
- Sovacool, BK and MH Dworkin. Global Energy Justice: Principles, Problems, and Practices (Cambridge: Cambridge University Press, 2014)
- Sovacool, BK (Ed.). Energy Security (London: Sage, Six Volumes, 2014)
- Sovacool, BK (Ed.). Energy, Poverty, and Development (London: Routledge Critical Concepts in Development Studies Series, Four Volumes, 2014)
- Sovacool, BK and BO Linnér. The Political Economy of Climate Change Adaptation (Basingstoke UK/New York United States: Palgrave Macmillan and the Nature Publishing Group, 2015)
- Sovacool, BK, MA Brown, and SV Valentine. Fact and Fiction in Global Energy Policy: Fifteen Contentious Questions (Baltimore: Johns Hopkins University Press, 2016)
- Van de Graaf, T, BK Sovacool, F Kern, A Ghosh, and MT Klare (Eds.). The Palgrave Handbook of the International Political Economy of Energy (Basingstoke UK/New York United States: Palgrave Macmillan Handbooks in International Political Economy Series, 2016)
- Valentine, SV, MA Brown, and BK Sovacool. Empowering the Great Energy Transition: Policy for a Low-Carbon Future (New York: Columbia University Press, 2019)
- Sovacool, BK. Visions of Energy Futures: Imagining and Innovating Low-Carbon Transitions (New York and London: Routledge, 2019).
- Noel, L, J Kester, G Zarazua de Rubens, and BK Sovacool. Vehicle-to-Grid: A Sociotechnical Transition Beyond Electric Mobility (Basingstoke: Palgrave, 2019).
- Van de Graaf, T and BK Sovacool. Global Energy Politics (Oxford: Polity Press, 2020).

== See also ==
- 100% renewable energy
- Renewable energy commercialization
- Renewable energy in developing countries
- Comparisons of life-cycle greenhouse gas emissions
