= Deia Schlosberg =

American documentary filmmaker

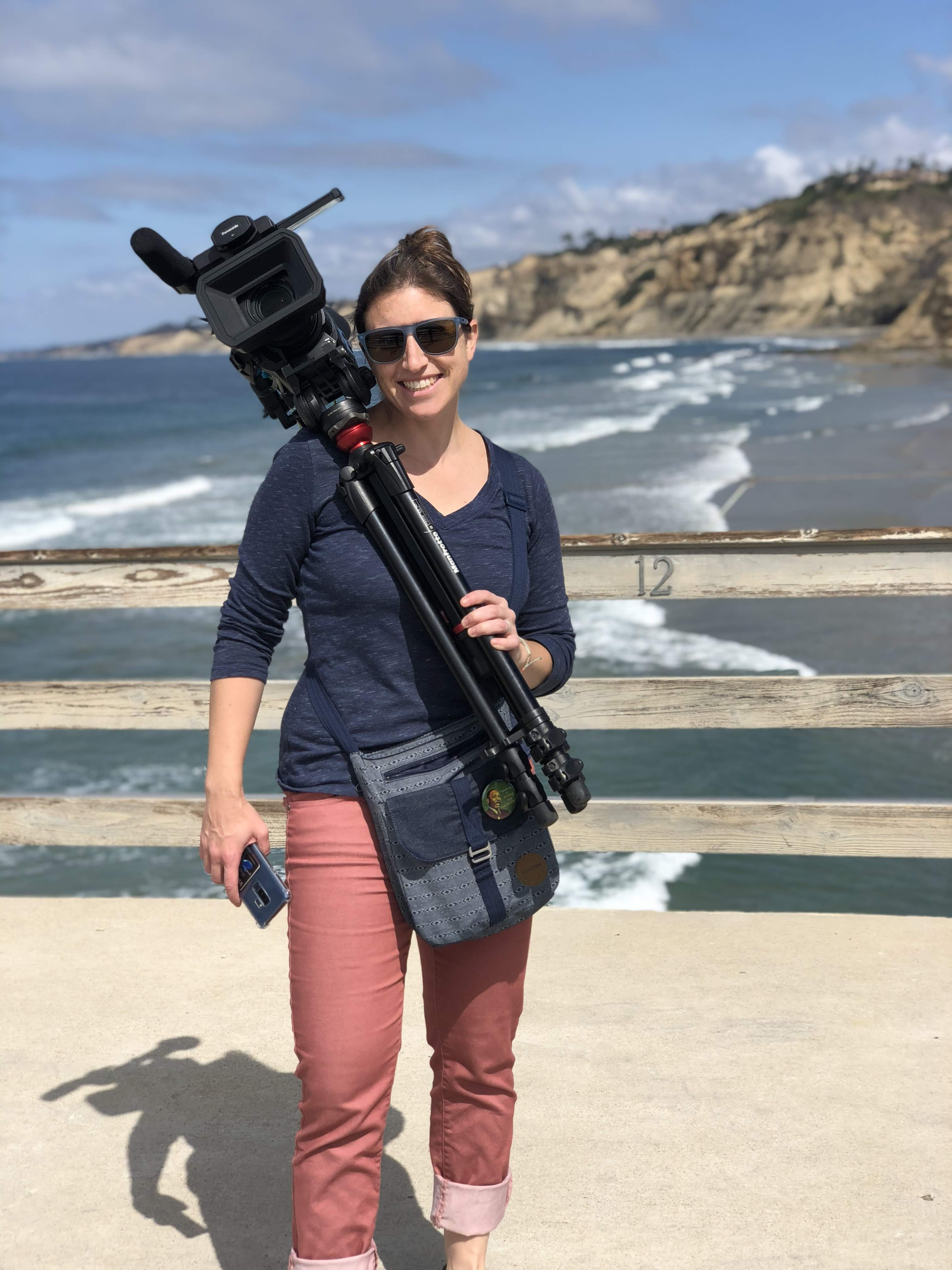
- Education: Washington University in St. Louis; Montana State University
- Occupation: Documentary filmmaker

Deia Schlosberg is an American documentary filmmaker and producer. She is the recipient of one Emmy and two Student Emmys. Her October 2016 arrest while filming an anti-fossil fuel protest in North Dakota led to a viral #freedeia social media campaign and an open letter to President Barack Obama co-signed by 30 celebrities. The arrest and subsequent charges put Deia at risk of 45 years in prison and contributed to a worrying pattern of attacks on journalistic freedom.

== Early life ==
Deia Schlosberg graduated from Washington University in St. Louis with a Bachelor of Arts and Bachelor of Fine Arts Degrees in 2003, majoring in Earth and Planetary Sciences and Visual Communications. She attended Montana State University, where she earned a Master of Fine Arts in Science & Natural History Filmmaking.

== Career ==
Schlosberg directed Backyard, a documentary film about hydraulic fracturing. She produced the 2016 documentary How to Let Go of the World and Love All the Things Climate Can't Change.

Schlosberg won the National Geographic Adventurer of the Year award in 2009, after spending two years trekking 7,800 miles along the spine of the Andes Mountains, together with Gregg Treinish. Five years later, in 2014, she won the Best Documentary Award and the Bricker Humanitarian Award from the Student Emmy Awards in 2014.

On October 11, 2016, Schlosberg was arrested while filming protesters of the TransCanada Keystone Pipeline in Walhalla, North Dakota. She was charged with conspiracy to theft of property, conspiracy to theft of services and conspiracy to tampering with or damaging a public service. Within two days, film director Josh Fox wrote an open letter to US President Barack Obama calling for her release; the letter was co-signed by thirty celebrities, including Neil Young, Mark Ruffalo, Daryl Hannah, Frances Fisher, and Alex Ebert of Edward Sharpe and the Magnetic Zeros. Josh Fox commented, “They have in my view violated the First Amendment. It’s fucking scary, it knocks the wind of your sails, it throws you for a loop. They threw the book at Deia for being a journalist.” Subsequently, she co-produced Lindsey Grayzel's 2018 film, The Reluctant Radical, about one of the protesters involved with the protest action. Deia also co-produced the documentary Awake, A Dream from Standing Rock in 2017.

In 2019, Schlosberg premiered the documentary The Story of Plastic, her feature directorial debut created in partnership with the Story of Stuff organization. The film, which addressed misleading corporate narratives surrounding the plastic pollution crisis as well as the damage done at every stage along the life cycle of the fossil fuel product, was picked up by The Discovery Channel to anchor their programming for the 50th anniversary of Earth Day on April 22, 2020. The film was awarded an Emmy for Outstanding Writing in a Documentary in 2021.

== See also ==
- Amy Goodman: An investigative journalist who was also arrested while covering pipeline related protests.
