= James Spione =

American film director

- Born: James Michael Spione; United States
- Occupations: Film director, producer, writer

James Michael Spione is an American director, producer, writer and editor of both documentary and fiction films. Early on in his career, he developed a reputation for suspenseful dramatic shorts; his later career, however, has been marked by a new focus on short and feature-length documentaries for theatrical release, public television broadcast and worldwide digital streaming.

His film, Incident in New Baghdad, was nominated in the Documentary Short Subject category of the 84th Academy Awards.

== Early life and education ==
Born in the Hudson Valley region of New York State, Spione graduated with Honors in 1985 from the Film Directing program at the State University of New York at Purchase.

He first achieved national recognition in 1987, when he received a Student Academy Award for his dramatic thesis film Prelude, about an adolescent boy's solo journey into the Adirondack Mountains. In 2018, the film was digitally restored by the academy for inclusion in its Short Film Archives.

== Life and career ==
During the 1990s, Spione wrote and directed several other notable dramatic shorts, including Garden (1994), which starred fellow SUNY alumni Melissa Leo and Matt Malloy. An eerie period drama about a disturbed father's homecoming, Garden was featured in the Shorts Program at the 1995 Sundance Film Festival and played at numerous other national and international film festivals.

Spione next wrote and directed The Playroom (1996), starring Pamela Holden Stewart, which was shown at the Walter Reade Theatre in New York City as part of the "Independents Night" series and broadcast on the national cable program "Reel Street." Spione also produced and co-edited John G. Young's first feature, Parallel Sons, which premiered at Sundance in the Dramatic Competition and was later distributed by Strand Releasing.

During the 2000s, Spione began to produce and direct nonfiction films. In 2005, he made American Farm, a feature-length documentary that focused on the predicament of his family's 5th-generation dairy farm in central New York State. The film premiered at the Fenimore Art Museum in Cooperstown, New York, and went on to play theatres from the Berkshires to the Midwest. Spione often toured with the movie and would hold frequent Q&A sessions at each regional premiere to engage the audience directly in discussions about the state of family farming in America.

In 2008, Spione collaborated with The Barrier Islands Center in Machipongo, Virginia on a historical documentary, Our Island Home, about the last surviving residents of a vanished settlement on the Eastern Shore of Virginia. Our Island Home premiered at the Barrier Islands Center and was subsequently broadcast by WHRO-TV in Norfolk, Virginia.^{11} Like American Farm, Spione released the DVD version of the movie through his own production and distribution company, Morninglight Films. Over the ensuing years, Spione has returned to the area numerous times, working with the center to create a series of shorts about the unique history and culture of the region, including "Spirit of the Bird" (2012), "Watermen" (2014), "The Last Hunt Clubs" (2016), "Welcome to the Table" (2018), "Gatherings" (2020), "Island Empire: The Story of the Cobbs" (2022) and "The Almshouse" (2024).

Released in 2010 was Inauguration, a verite documentary concerning the events on the streets of Washington, D.C. leading up to the swearing-in of Barack Obama.

Spione's 2011 Oscar-nominated film Incident in New Baghdad was a first-person account of the infamous July 12, 2007, Baghdad airstrike that killed two Reuters journalists, along with about a dozen other mostly unarmed individuals, in a suburb of Baghdad during one of the most violent and chaotic periods of the Iraq War.^{1} The film premiered theatrically at the 2011 Tribeca Film Festival in New York City, where it won the prize for Best Short Documentary.

The director next completed a feature documentary called Silenced, about the Obama Administration's crackdown on U.S. national security whistleblowers including Thomas Andrews Drake and John Kiriakou. The film premiered at the Tribeca Film Festival in April 2014. Silenced was broadcast nationally on the DirecTV Audience Channel in 2015, streamed worldwide on Netflix, and was nominated for a News and Documentary Emmy Award in the Outstanding Informational Long-Form Program category.

Spione's most recent feature is 2017's Awake, A Dream from Standing Rock, a collaborative work about the historic indigenous resistance to the Dakota Access Pipeline project near Cannon Ball, North Dakota. The film was produced in partnership with directors Josh Fox and Myron Dewey, producer Doug Good Feather and writer Floris White Bull. The film premiered at the 2017 Tribeca Film Festival and subsequently streamed on Netflix.

Concurrent with his film directing career, Spione often worked as a film and video editor on independent dramatic and documentary features (Darien Sills-Evans' X-Patriots, Spencer Mandell and Raymond Pagnucco's God's Open Hand), as well as numerous videos for national educational producer Human Relations Media.

He is currently making a new documentary about the civil rights-era photographer John Shearer.

== Praise and criticism ==
Among his short works, Garden received high praise from critics during the movie's film festival tour. Lawrence Toppman wrote in the Charlotte Observer that "James Spione creates more tension in 25 minutes than most writer-directors manage over two hours," and the film was Toppman's most recommended of the 1994 Charlotte Film Festival. Critic Greg Stacy of the Orange County Weekly called Garden a "real gem" with "the crushing inevitability of a Flannery O'Connor story." Reaction to Spione's later documentary work, however, has been somewhat more mixed. While American Farm was generally well received in newspapers such as the Wisconsin State Journal and the Burlington Free Press, at least one review by The A.V. Club was quite critical. Nonetheless, the DVD version of the movie was selected by Video Librarian magazine as one of the Best Documentaries of 2008. More recently, Incident in New Baghdad was described by critics as "truly not worth missing" and "one powerful and disturbing film." His feature documentary Silenced was called "hard-hitting, alarming" and "superb" by Documentary Magazine, and "compelling, suspenseful and intelligent" by Vice(magazine).

== Filmography ==
- John Shearer: American Moments (2026)
- The Almshouse (2024)
- Island Empire: The Story of the Cobbs (2022)
- Gatherings (2020)
- Welcome to the Table (2018)
- Awake: A Dream From Standing Rock (2017)
- The Last Hunt Clubs (2016)
- Watermen (2014)
- Silenced (2014)
- Spirit of the Bird (2012)
- Incident in New Baghdad (2011)
- Inauguration (2009)
- Our Island Home (2008)
- American Farm (2005)
- The Playroom (1996)
- Garden (1994)
- Prelude (1986)
