= Mark Z. Jacobson =

American climatologist and engineer (born 1965)

Mark Jacobson
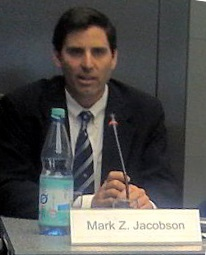
- Born: Mark Zachary Jacobson; 1965 (age 60–61)
- Education: Stanford University (BA, BS, MS); University of California, Los Angeles (MS, PhD)
- Scientific career
- Workplaces: University of California, Los Angeles; Stanford University
- Thesis: Developing, coupling, and applying a gas, aerosol, transport, and radiation model to study urban and regional air pollution (1994)
- Doctoral advisor: Richard P. Turco
- Website: Official website

Mark Zachary Jacobson (born 1965) is a professor of civil and environmental engineering at Stanford University and director of its Atmosphere/Energy Program. He is also a co-founder of the non-profit, Solutions Project.

== Overview ==
Jacobson pursued "better understanding air pollution and global warming problems and developing large-scale clean, renewable energy solutions to them". He has developed computer models to study the effects of fossil fuels, biofuels, and biomass burning on air pollution, weather, and climate. With these models, Jacobson examined the impacts of anthropogenic particles (black carbon and brown carbon) on health and climate. He presented such particles as the second-leading cause of global warming after carbon dioxide. Due to their strong health impacts and their short time in the air, he has also hypothesized that reducing their emissions may improve people's health and rapidly slow down global warming.

In a 2009 Scientific American paper, Jacobson and Mark Delucchi proposed that the world should move to 100% clean, renewable energy, namely wind, water, and solar power, across all energy sectors. He discussed and promoted the conversion of worldwide energy infrastructure to "100% wind, water, and sunlight (WWS) for all purposes" in many interviews Jacobson's 2015 study on transitioning the 50 states to WWS was cited as the scientific basis in House Resolution 540 (2015) and in the 2015 New York Senate Bill S5527 on renewable energy The Green New Deal appears compatible with Jacobson's scholarship.

Jacobson's clean energy solutions exclude nuclear power, carbon capture, and bioenergy, prompting a pushback by proponents of these technologies in the form of peer-reviewed letters and journal papers He has published peer-reviewed responses to these critics.

Jacobson has built his own net-zero home to run on renewable energy. He was also an expert witness in Held v. Montana, the first climate trial in U.S. history.

== Research ==
Jacobson has published research on the role of black carbon and other aerosol chemical components on global and regional climates.

Jacobson advocates a speedy transition to 100% renewable energy in order to limit climate change, air pollution damage, and energy security issues. Jacobson co-founded the non-profit Solutions Project in 2011 along with Marco Krapels, Mark Ruffalo, and Josh Fox. The Solutions Project was started to combine science, business, and culture in an effort to educate the public and policymakers about the ability U.S. states and communities to switch to a "100% renewable world".

=== Soot and aerosol ===
Jacobson, as a PhD student at UCLA under Richard P. Turco, began computer model development in 1990 with the development of algorithms for what is now called GATOR-GCMOM (Gas, Aerosol, Transport, Radiation, General Circulation, Mesoscale, and Ocean Model). This model simulates air pollution, weather, and climate from the local to global scale. Zhang (2008, pp. 2901, 2902) calls Jacobson's model "the first fully-coupled online model in the history that accounts for all major feedbacks among major atmospheric processes based on first principles."

Several of the individual computer code solvers Jacobson developed for GATOR-GCMOM include the gas and aqueous chemistry ordinary differential equations solvers SMVGEAR and SMVGEAR II, alongside a slew of other related and different modules, The GATOR-GCMOM model has incorporated these processes and has evolved over several decades.

One of the most important fields of research that Jacobson has added to, with the aid of GATOR-GCMOM, is re-defining the range of values on exactly how much diffuse tropospheric black carbon from fossil fuel, biofuel, and biomass burning affects the climate. Unlike greenhouse gases, black carbon absorbs solar radiation. It then converts the solar energy to heat, which is re-emitted to the atmosphere. Without such absorption, much of the sunlight would potentially reflect back out to space since it would have struck a more reflective surface. Therefore, as a whole, soot affects the planet's albedo, a unit of reflectance. On the other hand, greenhouse gases warm the atmosphere by trapping thermal-infrared heat radiation that is emitted by the surface of the Earth.

Jacobson found that, as soot particles in the air age, they grow larger due to condensation by gases and collision/coalescence with other particles. He further found that when a soot particle obtained such a coating, more sunlight enters the particles, bounces around, and eventually gets absorbed by the black carbon. On a global scale, this may result in twice the heating by black carbon as uncoated particles. Upon detailed calculations, he concluded that black carbon may be the second-leading cause of global warming in terms of radiative forcing. Two additional important effects of soot that contribute to its strong global warming that Jacobson has analyzed include its impact on melting snow and sea ice and on evaporating clouds.

Jacobson's refinement to the warming impacts of soot and his conclusion that black carbon may be the second leading cause of global warming in terms of radiative forcing was affirmed in the comprehensive review of Bond et al. (2013). For this body of work, he received the Henry G. Houghton Award from the American Meteorological Society in 2005 and the American Geophysical Union Ascent Award in 2013.

Jacobson has also independently modeled and corroborated the work of World Health Organization researchers, who likewise estimate that soot/particulate matter produced from the burning of fossil fuels and biofuels may cause over 1.5 million premature deaths each year from diseases such as respiratory illness, heart disease and asthma. These deaths occur mostly in the developing world where wood, animal dung, kerosene, and coal are used for cooking.

Because of the short atmospheric lifetime of black carbon, in 2002 Jacobson concluded that controlling soot is the fastest way to begin to control global warming and that it will likewise improve human health. However, he cautioned that controlling carbon dioxide, the leading cause of global warming, was imperative for stopping warming.

=== 100% renewable energy ===
Jacobson has published papers about transitioning to 100% renewable energy systems, including the grid integration of renewable energy. He has concluded that wind, water, and solar (WWS) power can be scaled up in cost-effective ways to fulfill world energy demands in all energy sectors, In 2009 Jacobson and Mark A. Delucchi published "A Plan to Power 100 Percent of the Planet with Renewables" in Scientific American. The article addressed several issues related to transitioning to 100% WWS, such as the energy required in a 100% electric world, the worldwide spatial footprint of wind farms, the availability of scarce materials needed to manufacture new systems and the ability to produce reliable energy on demand. Jacobson has updated and expanded this 2009 paper as the years progress, including a two-part article in the journal Energy Policy in 2011. Jacobson and his colleague estimated that 3.8 million wind turbines of 5-Megawatt (MW) size, 49,000 300-MW concentrated solar power plants, 40,000 300-MW solar PV power plants, 1.7 billion 3-kW rooftop PV systems, 5350 100-MW geothermal power plants, and some 270 new 1300-MW hydroelectric power plants would be needed. All of which would require approximately 1% of the world's land to be achieved.

Jacobson and his colleagues then published papers on transitioning three states to 100% renewable/WWS energy by 2050. On October 9, 2013, following the publication of his New York energy plan, Jacobson appeared on the Late Show with David Letterman to discuss the plan. In 2015, Jacobson was the lead author of two peer-reviewed papers, one of which examined the feasibility of transitioning each of the 50 United States to a 100% renewable energy system, powered exclusively by wind, water and sunlight (WWS), and the other that provided one proposed method to solve the grid reliability problem with high shares of intermittent sources. In 2016 the editorial board of PNAS selected the grid integration study of Jacobson and his co-workers as best paper in the category "Applied Biological, Agricultural, and Environmental Sciences" and awarded him a Cozzarelli Prize.

Jacobson has also published papers to transition 139, 143, 145 and 149 countries as well as cities and 74 metropolitan areas to 100% WWS renewable energy for all purposes. For his work on solving large-scale air pollution and climate problems, Jacobson was awarded the Judi Friedman Lifetime Achievement award in 2018. In 2021, Jacobson was named the Visionary CleanTech Influencer of the Year for Visionary Individuals at the World CleanTech Awards. In 2022, based on the impact of his research through citations to papers, Jacobson was ranked as the most impactful scientist in the world in the field of Meteorology & Atmospheric Sciences among those with their first publication past 1985. In the Energy field, he was ranked number six among those with their first publication past 1980. In 2023, Jacobson was included in the list of the 100 people who have made the most significant impact on the world by Worth (Magazine). On January 30, 2025, Jacobson was named one of the 10 Clean Energy Leaders to Know and Follow in 2025 by Climate Insider.

Jacobson is co-founder of the non-profit The Solutions Project along with Marco Krapels, Mark Ruffalo, and Josh Fox.

=== Opinions on nuclear energy ===
Jacobson argues that if the United States wants to reduce global warming, air pollution and energy instability, it should invest only in the best energy options, and that nuclear power is not one of them. To support his claim, Jacobson provided an analysis in 2009 that intended to inform policy makers on which energy sources are best for solving the air pollution, climate, and energy security problems the world faces. He updated this analysis in his 2020 textbook.

That analysis accounted for some emission sources not included in previous analyses, The primary emissions due to nuclear energy are called "opportunity-cost emissions." These are the emissions due to the long time lag between planning and operation of a nuclear plant (10 to 19 years) versus a wind or solar farm (2 to 5 years), for example. Of the total estimated emissions from nuclear in the 2009 study (68–180.1 g/kWh), 59–106 g/kWh was due to opportunity-cost emissions. Most of the rest (9-70 g/kWh) was due to lifecycle emissions, and a small amount (0–4.1 g/kWh) was due to the risk of carbon emissions associated with the burning of cities resulting from a nuclear war aided by the expansion of nuclear energy to countries previously without them, and the subsequent development of weapons in those countries. Jacobson raised this last assumption during a Ted talk Does the world need nuclear energy? in 2010, with Jacobson heading the debate in the negative.

Like his PhD advisor Richard P. Turco, who notably coined the phrase "nuclear winter", Jacobson has taken a similar approach to calculating the hypothetical effects of nuclear wars on the climate but has further extended this into providing an analysis that intends to inform policy makers on which energy sources to support, as of 2009. Jacobson's analyses suggest that after accounting for all factors "nuclear power results in around 25 times more carbon emissions per unit energy than wind energy".

This analysis is controversial. Jacobson arrived at this conclusion of "25 times more carbon emissions than wind, per unit of energy generated" (68–180.1 g/kWh), by specifically expanding on some concepts that are highly contested. These include, though are not limited to, the suggestion that emissions associated with civil nuclear energy should, in the upper limit, include the risk of carbon emissions associated with the burning of cities resulting from a nuclear war aided by the expansion of nuclear energy and weapons to countries previously without them. An assumption that Jacobson's debating opponent similarly raised, during the Ted talk Does the world need nuclear energy? in 2010, with Jacobson heading the debate in the negative. Jacobson assumes, at the high end (180.1 g/kWh), that 4.1 g/kWh are due to some form of nuclear induced burning that will occur once every 30 years. At the low end, 0 g/kWh are due to nuclear induced burning.

The Intergovernmental Panel on Climate Change(IPCC) regard Yale University's Warner and Heath's methodology, used to determine the Life-cycle greenhouse-gas emissions of energy sources, as the most credible, reporting that the conceivable range of total-life-cycle nuclear power emission figures, are between 4 and 110 g/kWh, with the specific median value of 12 g/kWh, being deemed the strongest supported and 11 g/kWh for Wind. Jacobson's limited lifecycle figures, of 9-70 g/kWh, falls within this IPCC range. The IPCC however, does not factor in Jacobson's "opportunity cost" emissions on any energy source. The IPCC has not provided an explanation for not including Jacobson's "opportunity costs". Aside from the time required for planning, financing, permitting, and constructing a power plant, for every energy source that can be analyzed, the time required and therefore Jacobson's "opportunity costs" also depends on political factors, for example hypothetical legal cases that can stall construction and other issues that can arise from site specific NIMBYISM. It is the delay/opportunity cost CO_{2} of emissions that are the bulk of the difference between Jacobson's overall emissions for nuclear of 68–180.1 g/kWh and the IPCC's lifecycle emissions.

Although nuclear advocates have balked at the idea of including even a small risk of emissions, even at the high end, from a potential nuclear war arising from the spread of nuclear energy, the IPCC has stated that,

"Barriers to and risks associated with an increasing use of nuclear energy include operational risks and the associated safety concerns, uranium mining risks, financial and regulatory risks, unresolved waste management issues, nuclear weapons proliferation concerns, and adverse public opinion."

In 2012, Jacobson coauthored a paper estimating the health effects of the Fukushima nuclear disaster. The paper projected approximately 180 "cancer-related morbidities" to eventually occur in the public. Health physicist Kathryn Higley of Oregon State University wrote in 2012, "The methods of the study were solid, and the estimates were reasonable, although there is still uncertainty around them. But given how much cancer already exists in the world, it would be very difficult to prove that anyone's cancer was caused by the incident at Fukushima Daiichi." Burton Richter, tenured in Stanford with Jacobson, who analyzed the use of the disputed Linear no-Threshold (LNT) model in the paper, similarly stated in his critique, "It is a first rate job and uses sources of radioactivity measurements that have not been used before to get a very good picture of the geographic distribution of radiation, a very good idea". Richter also noted that "I also think there is too much editorializing about accident potential at Diablo Canyon which makes [Jacobson's] paper sound a bit like an anti-nuclear piece instead of the very good analysis that it is."

=== Critiques of 100% renewable papers and court controversy ===
Jacobson's renewable energy solutions exclude nuclear power, carbon capture, and bioenergy. This has resulted in pushback by some scientists. 21 researchers published a critique in 2017 of Jacobson's "100% Renewable" paper of the United States. Jacobson and his coauthors published a response to the critical paper and also requested the journal and authors to either correct "false factual claims" of modeling error or retract the article. After both declined, Jacobson filed a lawsuit in 2017 against the Proceedings of the National Academy of Sciences and Christopher Clack as the principal author of the paper for defamation. Jacobson's critics described the lawsuit as an attack on free speech and scientific inquiry, however Jacobson disagreed with this characterization. Jacobson voluntarily dismissed his lawsuit without prejudice in February 2018, two days after a court hearing on the defendants' special motion to dismiss pursuant to the D.C. Anti-SLAPP (Strategic Litigation Against Public Participation) Act. Jacobson explained his dismissal as follows: "It became clear… that it is possible that there could be no end to this case for years." In 2022, Jacobson appealed a trial court order for him to pay $428K in legal fees incurred by defendants in his lawsuit prior to his voluntary dismissal of it. In February 2024, Jacobson lost the appeal and was required to pay defendants more than $500,000 in legal fees. On June 26, 2022, the California Labor Commissioner ordered Stanford University to pay nearly $70,000 to Jacobson for legal expenses he incurred in the Washington D.C. case and reserved a decision on indemnifying him for his remaining expenses, reasoning that because the critique in question "tarnished Plaintiff's reputation," "defending his reputation" was necessary for his job. Stanford, which had declined to intervene on behalf of Jacobson, appealed that ruling.

Jacobson was also an expert witness on behalf of 16 youth plaintiffs in Held v. Montana, the first climate trial in U.S. history. Jacobson testified that the state could transition to renewable energy. The judge ruled in favor of the youth plaintiffs. Jacobson was an expert witness in Navahine v. State of Hawaii, the world's first constitutional climate case to reach a settlement. On December 18, 2024, the Montana Supreme Court upheld Held v. Montana 6–1, ruling that the right to a clean and healthful environment under the Montana constitution includes the right to a stable climate system.

== Publications ==
=== Books ===
- Jacobson, M. Z., Fundamentals of Atmospheric Modeling. Cambridge University Press, New York, 656 pp., 1999.
- Jacobson, M. Z., Atmospheric Pollution: History, Science, and Regulation, Cambridge University Press, New York, 399 pp., 2002.
- Jacobson, M. Z., Fundamentals of Atmospheric Modeling, Second Edition, Cambridge University Press, New York, 813 pp., 2005.
- Jacobson, M. Z., Air Pollution and Global Warming: History, Science, and Solutions, Cambridge University Press, New York, 2011.
- Jacobson, M.Z., 100% Clean, Renewable Energy and Storage for Everything, Cambridge University Press, New York, 427 pp., 2020.
- Jacobson, Mark Z. (2023). No Miracles Needed: How Today's Technology Can Save Our Climate and Clean Our Air. New York: Cambridge University Press. p. 454. ISBN 978-1-009-24954-6.

=== Selected articles ===
- Bond, T. C.; Doherty, S. J.; Fahey, D. W.; et al. (2013). "Bounding the role of black carbon in the climate system: A scientific assessment". Journal of Geophysical Research: Atmospheres. 118 (11): 5380–5552. Bibcode:2013JGRD..118.5380B. doi:10.1002/jgrd.50171. Wikidata Q55879806.
- Jacobson, Mark Z (2001). "Strong radiative heating due to the mixing state of black carbon in atmospheric aerosols". Nature. 409 (6821): 695–697. doi:10.1038/35055518. PMID 11217854. Wikidata Q46131808.
- Jacobson, Mark Z (2001). "Global direct radiative forcing due to multicomponent anthropogenic and natural aerosols". Journal of Geophysical Research. 106 (D2): 1551–1568. Bibcode:2001JGR...106.1551J. doi:10.1029/2000jd900514. Wikidata Q55981483.
- Streets, David G.; Jiang, Kejun; Hu, Xiulian; Sinton, Jonathan E.; Zhang, Xiao-Quan; Xu, Deying; Jacobson, Mark Z.; James E. Hansen (2001). "Recent reductions in China's greenhouse gas emissions". Science. 294 (5548): 1835–1837. doi:10.1126/science.1065226. PMID 11729288. S2CID 2660371. Wikidata Q30666428.
additional articles
- Jacobson, Mark Z (2001). "Global direct radiative forcing due to multicomponent anthropogenic and natural aerosols". Journal of Geophysical Research. 106 (2): 1551–1568. Bibcode:2001JGR...106.1551J. doi:10.1029/2000JD900514.
- Jacobson, Mark Z (2002). "Control of fossil-fuel particulate black carbon and organic matter, possibly the most effective method of slowing global warming". Journal of Geophysical Research. 107 (D19): 16–22. Bibcode:2002JGRD..107.4410J. doi:10.1029/2001JD001376.
- Jacobson, Mark Z; Colella, W. G.; Golden, D. M. (2005). "(2005) Cleaning the Air and Improving Health with Hydrogen Fuel-Cell Vehicles". Science. 308 (5730): 1901–1905. Bibcode:2005Sci...308.1901J. doi:10.1126/science.1109157. PMID 15976300. S2CID 1859983.
- Jacobson, Mark Z; Archer, Christina L. (2005). "Evaluation of global wind power". Journal of Geophysical Research. 110 (D12): 16–22. Bibcode:2005JGRD..11012110A. doi:10.1029/2004JD005462. hdl:11583/3008199.
- Jacobson, Mark Z (2009). "Review of solutions to global warming, air pollution, and energy security". Energy and Environmental Science. 2 (2): 148–173 [155]. Bibcode:2009GeCAS..73R.581J. doi:10.1039/b809990c.
- Jacobson, Mark Z; Delucchi, Mark A. (2011). "Providing all global energy with wind, water, and solar power, Part I: Technologies, energy resources, quantities and areas of infrastructure, and materials". Energy Policy. 39 (3): 1154–1169. Bibcode:2011EnPol..39.1154J. doi:10.1016/j.enpol.2010.11.040.
- Jacobson, Mark Z; Delucchi, Mark A. (2011). "Providing all global energy with wind, water, and solar power, Part II: Reliability, system and transmission costs, and policies". Energy Policy. 39 (3): 1170–1190. Bibcode:2011EnPol..39.1170D. doi:10.1016/j.enpol.2010.11.045.
- Jacobson, Mark Z; Archer, Christina L. (2012). "Saturation wind power potential and its implications for wind energy". Proceedings of the National Academy of Sciences. 109 (39): 15679–15684. Bibcode:2012PNAS..10915679J. doi:10.1073/pnas.1208993109. PMC 3465402. PMID 23019353.
- Jacobson; et al. (2015). "100% clean and renewable wind, water, and sunlight (WWS) all-sector energy roadmaps for the 50 United States". Energy and Environmental Science. 8 (7): 2093–2117. Bibcode:2015EnEnS...8.2093J. doi:10.1039/C5EE01283J.
- Jacobson; et al. (2015). "Low-cost solution to the grid reliability problem with 100% penetration of intermittent wind, water, and solar for all purposes". Proceedings of the National Academy of Sciences. 112 (49): 15060–15065. Bibcode:2015PNAS..11215060J. doi:10.1073/pnas.1510028112. PMC 4679003. PMID 26598655.
- Jacobson, Mark Z.; Delucchi, Mark A.; Cameron, Mary A.; Frew, Bethany A. (June 27, 2017). "The United States can keep the grid stable at low cost with 100% clean, renewable energy in all sectors despite inaccurate claims". Proceedings of the National Academy of Sciences. 114 (26): E5021–E5023. Bibcode:2017PNAS..114E5021J. doi:10.1073/pnas.1708069114. PMC 5495290. PMID 28630350.
- Jacobson, Mark Z.; Delucchi, Mark A.; Cameron, Mary A.; Mathiesen, Brian V. (August 1, 2018). "Matching demand with supply at low cost in 139 countries among 20 world regions with 100% intermittent wind, water, and sunlight (WWS) for all purposes". Renewable Energy. 123: 236–248. Bibcode:2018REne..123..236J. doi:10.1016/j.renene.2018.02.009. S2CID 46784278.
- Jacobson, Mark Z. (2019). "The health and climate impacts of carbon capture and direct air capture". Energy & Environmental Science. 12 (12): 3567–3574. Bibcode:2019EnEnS..12.3567J. doi:10.1039/C9EE02709B. S2CID 207925484.
- Jacobson, Mark Z. (January 21, 2009). "Review of solutions to global warming, air pollution, and energy security". Energy & Environmental Science. 2 (2): 148–173. Bibcode:2009GeCAS..73R.581J. doi:10.1039/B809990C.
- Jacobson, Mark Z.; Delucchi, Mark A.; Bazouin, Guillaume; Bauer, Zack A. F.; Heavey, Christa C.; Fisher, Emma; Morris, Sean B.; Piekutowski, Diniana J. Y.; Vencill, Taylor A.; Yeskoo, Tim W. (July 3, 2015). "100% clean and renewable wind, water, and sunlight (WWS) all-sector energy roadmaps for the 50 United States". Energy & Environmental Science. 8 (7): 2093–2117. Bibcode:2015EnEnS...8.2093J. doi:10.1039/C5EE01283J.
- Jacobson, Mark Z.; Delucchi, Mark A.; Cameron, Mary A.; Coughlin, Stephen J.; Hay, Catherine A.; Manogaran, Indu Priya; Shu, Yanbo; von Krauland, Anna-Katharina (December 20, 2019). "Impacts of Green New Deal Energy Plans on Grid Stability, Costs, Jobs, Health, and Climate in 143 Countries". One Earth. 1 (4): 449–463. Bibcode:2019AGUFMPA32A..01J. doi:10.1016/j.oneear.2019.12.003. S2CID 210964561.
- M.Z., Jacobson. "100% Wind, Water, and Solar (WWS) All-Sector Energy Roadmaps for Countries, States, Cities, and Towns". Web.stanford.edu.

== See also ==
- Amory Lovins – American energy policy analyst
- Benjamin K. Sovacool – American academic
- Kick The Fossil Fuel Habit – 2010 book by Tom Rand
- Mark Diesendorf – Australian academic and environmentalist
- Nuclear power debate – Controversy over the use of nuclear power
- Renewable energy commercialization – Deployment of technologies harnessing easily replenished natural resources
- Renewable energy debate
- Stephen Thomas
- Vaclav Smil – Czech-Canadian scientist and policy analyst (born 1943)
