= Tom Rand =

Tom Rand may refer to:

- Tom Rand (costume designer)
- Tom Rand (venture capitalist)
