= The Solutions Project =

Renewable energy organization

The Solutions Project is an organization first conceived in 2011 by prominent figures in science, business and the entertainment media with the goal of utilizing the combined efforts of individuals in the fields of science, business and culture to accelerate the transition to 100% renewable energy use in the United States. Based on the results of academic research, the organization maintains that America is capable of meeting its entire energy needs through renewable energy sources, and that this goal can be achieved by the year 2050. (The organization defines renewable energy as solar power, wind power, hydroelectric power, geothermal energy and wave/tidal power.) Furthermore, the organization claims that the solutions that will be needed to achieve this goal are primarily social and political, not technical, in nature, as most of the technology necessary to bring about the transition already exists.

The organization has proposed what it calls the "50 States 50 Plans" initiative. These are plans developed for each of the 50 United States specifying the precise mix of renewable energy types that, given factors such as geography and climate, would allow that particular state to receive all of its energy from renewable sources by 2050. The organization claims that, beyond the issue of environmental sustainability, a number of significant benefits to society would come about if the initiative were adopted, including consumer energy cost savings, health cost savings and millions of long-term (40 years or more) jobs.

Founders of The Solutions Project include Stanford University professor Mark Z. Jacobson, renewable energy executive Marco Krapels, documentary filmmaker and activist Josh Fox and Hollywood actor and activist Mark Ruffalo.

== History ==
In June 2011, Mark Ruffalo made an appearance in Santa Monica to receive the 15th Annual Millennial award from the organization Global Green USA to honor his environmental activism — an honor he later admitted he did not believe he deserved. During the event, Ruffalo made mention of the Marcellus shale in the northeastern United States, which contains large deposits of shale gas that various energy developers in the region are either currently releasing or planning to release through the process of hydraulic fracturing, known as fracking. (Ruffalo strongly opposes this practice). Banker Marco Krapels — who worked as Executive Vice President for Rabobank, a sponsor of the event, and whose full first name happens to be Marcellus — approached Ruffalo and said "Hi, I'm Marcellus and I'm here to help you fight Marcellus."

By the time the two men met, Ruffalo had already recognized that it was not effective for him as an activist merely to express opposition to fracking and other carbon-based resource extraction practices; he needed to offer a viable alternative. Later that month, Ruffalo and Krapels met in California with a group of people including filmmaker Josh Fox, the director of the widely seen anti-fracking documentary, Gasland, and environmental engineer Prof. Mark Jacobson, head of Stanford University's Atmosphere and Energy Program. Ruffalo had read a Scientific American article that Prof. Jacobson had published in 2009 that proposed, on a macro level, the feasibility of a nationwide transition to 100 percent renewable energy. Ruffalo and Fox requested that Jacobson prepare a brief document providing greater detail about how such a transition might be accomplished for their home state, New York. Fox convened a conference call between Professor Jacobson and prominent Cornell Professors Anthony Ingraffea and Robert Howarth who agreed to work on the study in the hopes that it would provide an alternative to fracking in New York state. Initially, Jacobson, referring to his busy academic schedule, promised only "a few paragraphs." But the following day, Ruffalo found a 40-page feasibility study from Jacobson in his email. (Jacobson himself recalls the document as being 20 pages long.) Krapels in turn created a business model from this study. Jacobson also created studies for California and Washington State. A science team then employed basic calculations derived from these existing plans to create plans for the remaining 47 states.
