= Eric Saperston =

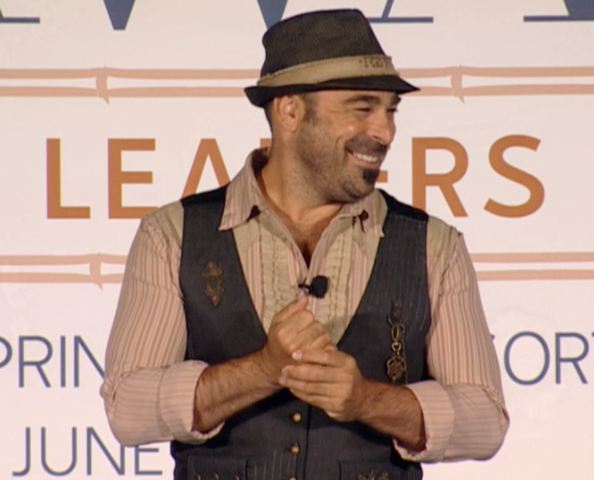
Saperston speaking to Lincoln Financial, Maui, Hawaii

Eric Saperston is an American author, director, and professional speaker.

== Career ==
In 2001, Saperston wrote and directed The Journey. It documents a cross-country trip he started in 1995 with three friends in a VW bus. The original intention for the trip was to follow the Grateful Dead and work a ski season in Aspen, Colorado. Challenged by a college mentor to make the trip more meaningful, Saperston began calling people he considered to be extraordinary and asked them out for a cup of coffee. The film documents conversations with former president Jimmy Carter, actor Henry Winkler, and leadership coach Marshall Goldsmith, among others.

The film was screened at a number of film festivals including South by Southwest, the Atlanta Film Festival, and the Phoenix Film Festival, and was reviewed in the New York Times and The Washington Post. It won a number of awards, including "Most Memorable Film Award" at the 2003 South by Southwest film festival, and was purchased for distribution by Seventh Art Releasing. Saperston was featured in Fast Company magazine for The Journey and interviewed on CNN. In 2003, Coca-Cola sponsored a tour of 45 universities to screen The Journey for student audiences.

Saperston published Live in Wonder in 2009. The book consists of inspirational quotes and leading questions readers can use to ask themselves or others. Peter Pauper Press published a journal to accompany the book. In 2016, Saperston was featured on Seattle's King5 News to promote his book and Live in Wonder campaign. A new edition of the book has been published in 2018.
