= Awake: A Dream From Standing Rock =

2017 documentary film

- Directed by: Josh Fox, James Spione, and Myron Dewey
- Written by: Floris White Bull
- Based on: Dakota Access Pipeline protests
- Produced by: Shailene Woodley
- Narrated by: Floris White Bull
- Release date: 2017
- Running time: 89 minutes
- Country: United States

Awake: A Dream From Standing Rock is a 2017 documentary directed by Josh Fox, James Spione, and Myron Dewey. The three-part 89 minute documentary features events at Dakota Access Pipeline protests. The film was produced by Josh Fox and International WOW Company.

== Production ==
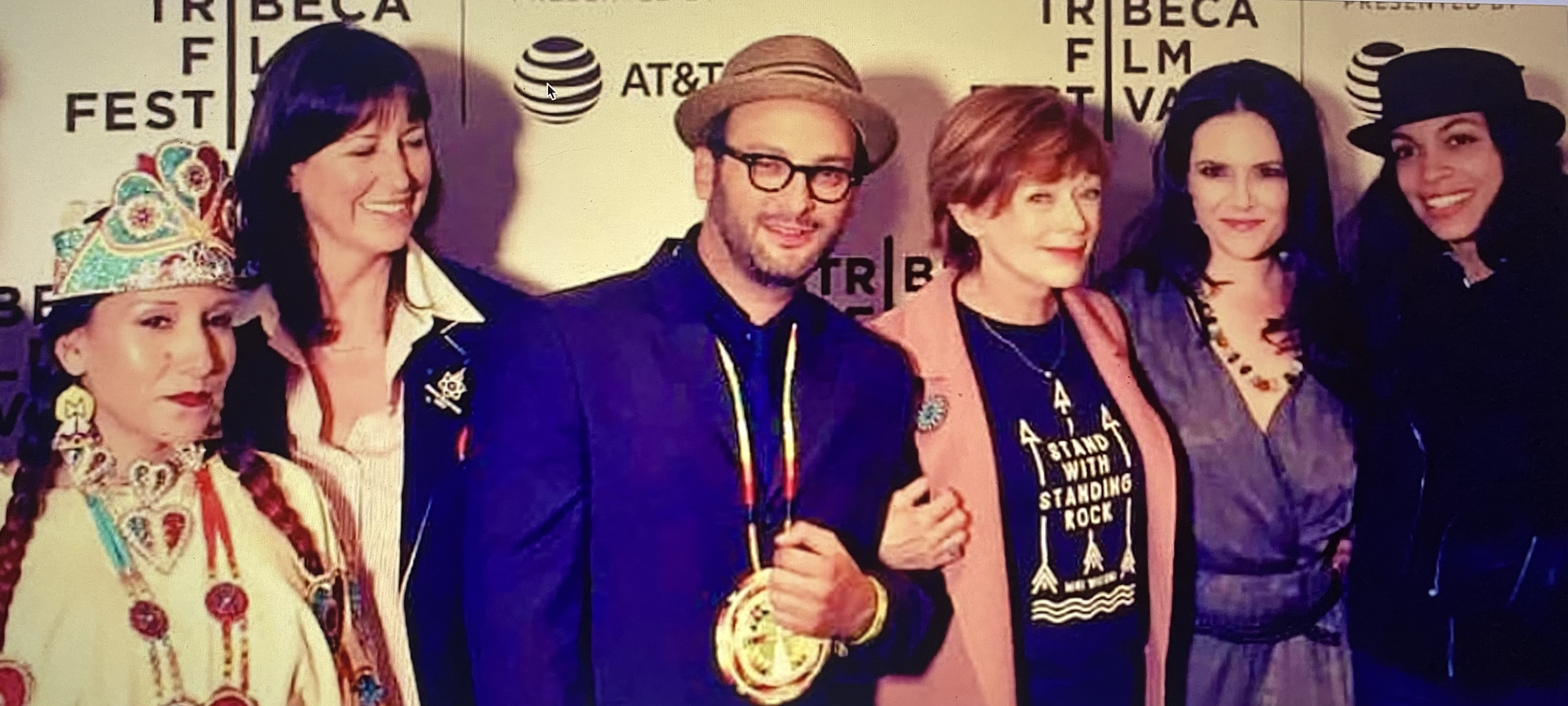
Josh Fox, Floris White Bull, Frances Fisher, Lauren Taschen, Nomiki Konst and Rosario Dawson at the premiere at Tribeca Film Festival in 2017

The 89 minute, three part documentary was filmed at the Standing Rock Sioux Reservation. It was directed by Josh Fox, James Spione, and Myron Dewey and written by Floris White Bull. Shailene Woodley features and is the executive producer.

The film premiered at the Tribeca Film Festival on Earth Day (April 22) 2017 before being made available via the video streaming service Netflix.

== Synopsis ==
Part one of the documentary is filmed by Josh Fox and narrated by Floris White Bull who discusses the path of the pipeline and its proximity to the Missouri River.

Part two of the film features footage of arrests, filmed by James Spione, without commentary.

Part three is filmed by Myron Dewey and includes an interview with philosopher and activist Cornel West at Dakota Access Pipeline plus other protest footage filmed by Dewey.

The film concludes with narratives about the role of the police and United States federal government in the construction of the pipeline.

== Critical reception ==
Writing for The Colgate Maroon-News, Claire Madsen described the documentary as a "poetic visual of the experience of the activists combined with investigative journalism in the context of sweeping political change"

Nick Estes described the film as a "jarring dream sequence, a cinematic poem of juxtaposed images and scenes of life and violence".

The film won the American Library Association's Notable Film for Adults award in February 2018.
