= Kick the Fossil Fuel Habit =

2010 book by Tom Rand

- Author: Tom Rand
- Publication date: 2010
- ISBN: 9780981295206

Kick The Fossil Fuel Habit: 10 Clean Technologies to Save Our World is a 2010 book by Tom Rand. The book is about making an energy transition from fossil fuels to clean technologies. Author Tom Rand says: "We'll need to deploy resources on a scale not seen since World War II, generate international co-operation, and develop rules to put a price on carbon."

Rand says that "energy security; the moral cost of supporting undemocratic regimes that sit on the oil we use; the military cost, both in blood and cash, to keep the supply lines open; and getting a leg up on the competition in the next industrial revolution. Each of these is reason enough to kick the habit".

== See also ==
- The Third Industrial Revolution – Book by Jeremy Rifkin
- The Clean Tech Revolution – Book by Ron Pernick
- List of books about renewable energy
- Mark Z. Jacobson – American climatologist and engineer (born 1965)
