= The Welcome Table (film) =

- Promotional release poster
- Directed by: Josh Fox
- Written by: Josh Fox
- Produced by: Josh Fox; Gabrielle Alicino; Doug Chapman; Molly Gandour; Darren Dean
- Edited by: Matthew Sanchez, Greg King, Juan Leguizamon, Josh Fox
- Production company: International WOW Company
- Distributed by: HBO Documentary Films
- Release date: June 23, 2026
- Running time: 131 minutes
- Country: United States
- Languages: English, Spanish, Portuguese, Italian, Turkana, Achuar, Bengali.

The Welcome Table is a 2026 American documentary film directed, written, and produced by Josh Fox. The film follows the story of climate migrants across six continents, centering the voices and experiences of survivors on the front lines of the climate crisis.

The film was released on June 23, 2026 through HBO and HBO Max.

== Production ==
Josh Fox wrote, directed, and produced the film. Gabrielle Alicino, Doug Chapman, Molly Gandour, and Darren Dean served as the producers for the film. John Boutté executive produced the film. Anna Klein is the senior producer. Nancy Abraham and Lisa Heller served as the executive producers for HBO. The climate refugees, aid workers, community leaders, and activists for the film were Leo Farah, Chris Achilo, Nelton Yankur, Allie Stratta, Chris Obehi, and Pauleteh Araújo. The film will feature live musical performances by John Boutté, Josh Fox, Handmade Moments, John Cameron Mitchell, Don Vappie, Chris Obehi, Sunpie Barnes, Gladney & Martin Masakowski, Sabine McCalla, Helen Gillet, Recreations Brass Band, Congo Square Preservation Society, The Baby Dolls, and The Rumble.

== Release ==
The film was released on June 23, 2026, both on HBO and HBO Max.
