= Incident in New Baghdad =

- Directed by: James Spione
- Edited by: James Spione
- Music by: Emile Menasche
- Distributed by: Seventh Art Releasing
- Release date: 2011
- Running time: 22 minutes
- Country: United States
- Language: English

Incident in New Baghdad is a 2011 short documentary film about the July 12, 2007, Baghdad airstrike, directed by James Spione.

The film features a first-person account from Ethan McCord, one of the first soldiers to arrive at the scene of the airstrike that killed 12 to "over 18" people and wounded 2 children in New Baghdad during the Iraq War.

The film premiered theatrically at the 2011 Tribeca Film Festival, where it won the prize for Best Short Documentary. It was nominated for the Academy Award for Best Documentary Short Subject at the 84th Academy Awards. It was the second Kickstarter-funded film to be nominated for an Academy Award.
