= Gasland =

2010 documentary film by Josh Fox

- Directed by: Josh Fox
- Written by: Josh Fox
- Produced by: Trish Adlesic; Josh Fox; Molly Gandour
- Narrated by: Josh Fox
- Cinematography: Josh Fox
- Edited by: Matthew Sanchez
- Production company: International WOW Company
- Distributed by: HBO
- Release date: January 24, 2010 (Sundance)
- Running time: 104 minutes
- Country: United States
- Language: English

Gasland is a 2010 American documentary film written and directed by Josh Fox. It focuses on communities in the United States where natural gas drilling activity was a concern and, specifically, on hydraulic fracturing ("fracking"), a method of stimulating production in otherwise impermeable rock. The film was a key mobilizer for the anti-fracking movement, and "brought the term 'hydraulic fracturing' into the nation's living rooms" according to The New York Times.

Fracking is a technique that has been used routinely since the late 1940s as an aid to stimulating production in oil and gas wells. Horizontal drilling, a recent innovation in drilling techniques, can create horizontal pathways deep within the Earth, and has successfully incorporated hydraulic fracturing to release fluids from shale formations. Horizontal drilling coupled with fracking has transformed the energy business, enabled vast new supplies of natural gas, and advanced the goal of United States energy independence.

The film premiered at the 2010 Sundance Film Festival, where it was awarded the Special Jury Prize for Documentary. In June 2010, it premiered on HBO to an audience of 3 million homes, and it was seen by over 250,000 audience members during a 250-city grassroots tour. Among its numerous nominations and awards, the film was nominated for Best Documentary Feature at the 83rd Academy Awards and won Outstanding Directing for Nonfiction Programming at the 63rd Primetime Emmy Awards.

== Synopsis ==
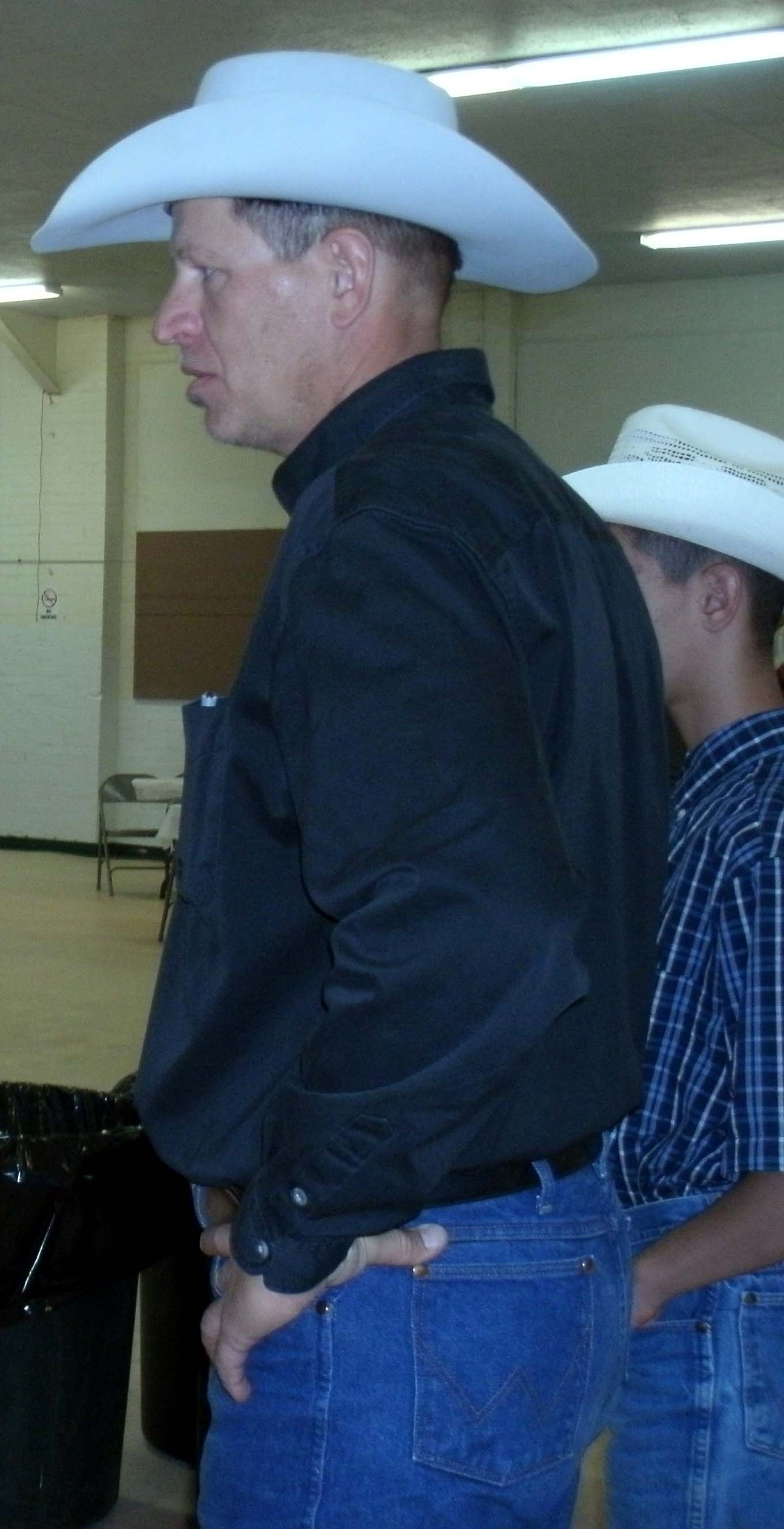
John Fenton, a farmer and rancher from Pavillion, Wyoming, became an internationally recognized anti-hydraulic fracturing activist following his appearance in Gasland. He is pictured here at a public event in Sheridan, Wyoming, on September 15, 2012.

Josh Fox describes his receipt of a letter in May 2008 from Cabot Oil & Gas (later Coterra), offering a signing bonus of nearly $100,000 to lease his family's land in Milanville, Pennsylvania, to drill for natural gas, after which he sets out to see how communities across the nation are being affected by the natural gas drilling boom. Beginning in Dimock Township, Susquehanna County, Pennsylvania, before driving to locations as far away as Colorado, Wyoming, Utah, and Texas, where the boom began a decade earlier, he spends time with citizens in their homes and on their land and hears stories about how hydraulic fracturing has contaminated their air, water wells, and surface water with methane and toxic chemicals, leading to a variety of chronic health problems and, sometimes, tap water that can be lit on fire. Although some residents have obtained court injunctions or settlement money from gas companies to replace the affected water supplies with drinking water or portable water purification kits, the companies continue to insist that fracking has never been proven to be the cause of any contamination. Fox is particularly troubled by what he learns because there are plans to begin drilling for natural gas in the portion of the Marcellus Formation formation that overlaps with the New York City water supply system and the Delaware River Basin, which together provide unfiltered drinking water to 15.6 million people in New York City, Pennsylvania, New Jersey, and Delaware. Scientists, government employees, and politicians describe how the Energy Policy Act of 2005 exempted hydraulic fracturing from the Safe Drinking Water Act, making the practice essentially unregulated, and, in the end, Fox finds himself in the halls of Congress as a subcommittee discusses the Fracturing Responsibility and Awareness of Chemicals Act, "a bill to amend the Safe Drinking Water Act to repeal a certain exemption for hydraulic fracturing", which never made it past the committee stage.

== Production ==
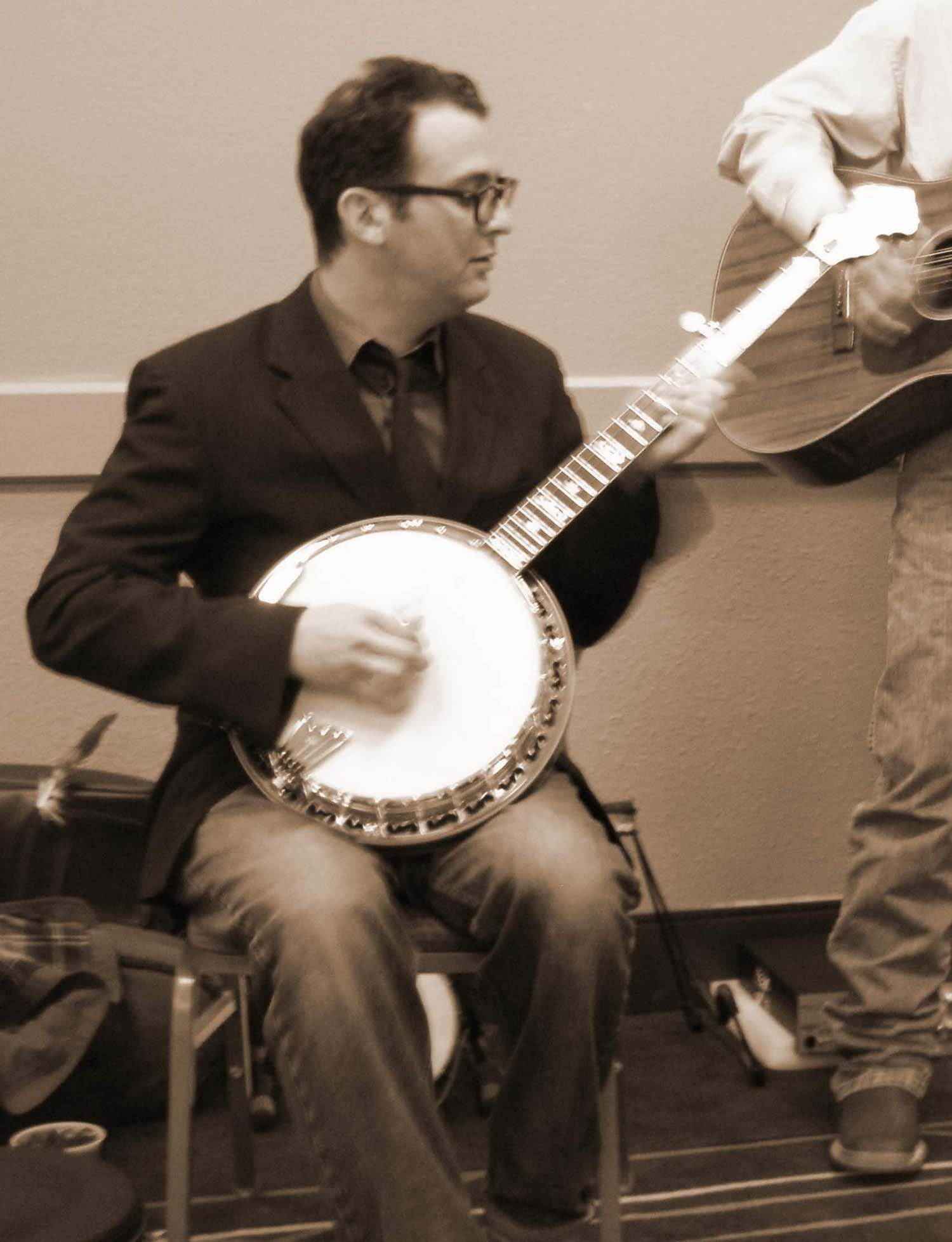
Josh Fox plays his banjo at a jam session following an environmental meeting at which he was the featured speaker in Sheridan, Wyoming, on November 5, 2011.

Gasland was Fox's first documentary and second film, following Memorial Day, a narrative feature from 2008. He made the film over the course of about 18 months and often worked by himself while filming, though later in the process he sometimes employed additional camera operators. Fox gave editor Matthew Sanchez credit for coming up with the structure of the film and said they edited roughly 200 hours of footage down to approximately 100 minutes.

Debra Winger is credited as a "creative consultant" on the film.

== Reception ==
=== Positive ===
On review aggregator website Rotten Tomatoes, the film has an approval rating of 98% based on 41 reviews, with an average score of 7/10; the website's "critics consensus" reads: "GasLand patiently and powerfully outlines alarming problems with modern fuel extraction -- and the horrific public health risks that go along with them."

Robert Koehler of Variety referred to the film as "one of the most effective and expressive environmental films of recent years", saying it "may become to the dangers of natural gas drilling what Silent Spring was to DDT."

Eric Kohn of IndieWire wrote: "Gasland is the paragon of first person activist filmmaking done right. […] By grounding a massive environmental issue in its personal ramifications, Fox turns Gasland into a remarkably urgent diary of national concerns."

A review in the Denton Record Chronicle said that "Fox decides that his own backyard in Pennsylvania isn’t his exclusive property. […] Set to his own banjo music and clever footage, Gasland is both sad and scary." The review concluded with the statement: "if your soul isn’t moved by the documentary, yours is a heart of shale."

Stewart Nusbaumer of HuffPost said the film "just might take you from outrage right into the fire of action."

Bloomberg News critic Dave Shiflett wrote that Fox "may go down in history as the Paul Revere of fracking."

Chicago TimeOut gave Gasland four out of five stars.

Australian film critic Julie Riggs called the documentary a "horror movie, and a wake-up call."

Mark Kermode of BBC Radio 5 Live gave the film a generally positive review, criticizing its similarity to other recent oil documentaries, yet praising its "extraordinary visual kick". He said "it is a very interesting story which is made better by the fact that the visuals of it are very poetic, very lyrical", and felt that its themes and ideas were relevant and well presented.

Fort Worth Business Press writer John-Laurent Tronche talked about the growing number of documentaries "that aim to shed a light on what they call a dirty, destructive practice: shale gas exploration. And although oil and gas supporters have labeled the motion pictures as radical propaganda, a local drilling activist said they’re part of a larger, critical look into an ever-growing industry."

=== Negative ===
Energy in Depth (EiD), launched by the Independent Petroleum Association of America, created a web page with a list of factual inaccuracies in the documentary, and produced an associated film titled TruthLand. In response to the EID's criticisms of the film, the makers of Gasland offered a rebuttal.

In an article for Forbes magazine, Dr. Michael Economides, a professor of engineering at the University of Houston and former consultant for energy companies including Chevron, Shell, and Petrobras, commented on the "scene from the upcoming documentary Gasland, which features a man lighting his faucet water on fire and making the ridiculous claim that natural gas drilling is responsible for the incident. The clip, though attention-getting, is wildly inaccurate and irresponsible. To begin with, the vertical depth separation between drinking water aquifers and reservoir targets for gas production is several thousand feet of impermeable rock. Any interchange between the two, if it were possible, would have happened already in geologic time, measured in tens of millions of years, not in recent history." Subsequent academic studies have proven that the area in which the scene takes place (Weld, Colorado) hydraulic fracturing - particularly due to leaking/damaged bores - had contaminated groundwater.

In an article for Movies on Chatham, Dr. Pam Hassebroek, a former petroleum reservoir engineer (Registered Professional Engineer) at both ExxonMobil Research and Shell, pointed out the long history of oil seeps in surface areas, saying that, in Pennsylvania and New York, surface oil has been documented since at least as far back as the 18th century. She also mentioned that U.S. oil and gas production has benefited from the use of hydraulic fracturing since the 1940s.

A documentary rebutting Gasland's claims, FrackNation, was successfully funded on Kickstarter and released in 2013.

=== Awards ===
Won

- Primetime Emmy Awards: Outstanding Directing for Nonfiction Programming (Josh Fox)
- Cinema Eye Honors: Outstanding Achievement in Graphic Design or Animation (Juan Cardarelli, Eric M. Levy, Alex Tyson)
- Environmental Media Awards: Best Documentary (Josh Fox)
- Sundance Film Festival: Special Jury Prize – Documentary (Josh Fox)
- Big Sky Documentary Film Festival: Artistic Vision Award – Feature (Josh Fox)
- Thin Line Film Festival: Audience Award
- Yale Environmental Film Festival: Grand Jury Prize
- Sarasota Film Festival: Special Jury Prize – Documentary Feature (Josh Fox)

Nominated

- Academy Awards: Best Documentary Feature (Josh Fox, Trish Adlesic)
- Writers Guild of America Awards: Best Documentary Screenplay (Josh Fox)
- Primetime Emmy Awards: Outstanding Writing for Nonfiction Programming (Josh Fox)
- Primetime Emmy Awards: Outstanding Cinematography for Nonfiction Programming (Josh Fox)
- Primetime Emmy Awards: Exceptional Merit in Nonfiction Programming (Trish Adlesic, Josh Fox, Molly Gandour)

== Sequel ==
A sequel to Gasland titled Gasland Part II premiered at the Tribeca Film Festival in New York City on April 21, 2013, and was broadcast on HBO on July 8. It won Best Documentary at both the Environmental Media Awards and the Wild and Scenic Film Festival, and was given the "Hell Yeah Prize" at the Cinema Eye Honors.

How to Let Go of the World and Love All the Things Climate Can't Change, the third part of the Gasland trilogy, premiered at the 2016 Sundance Film Festival, toured the world theatrically, and was broadcast on HBO in June. Like Gasland and Gasland Part II, it also won Best Documentary at the Environmental Media Awards.

== See also ==
- Anti-fracking movement
- Frackman
- Josh Fox
