= Gregg Treinish =

American conservationist (born 1982)

Gregg Treinish (born February 16, 1982) is an American conservationist and outdoor adventurer. He is the founder and executive director of Adventure Scientists, a nonprofit organization that equips scientific partners with data collected from the outdoors that are crucial to addressing environmental and human health challenges.

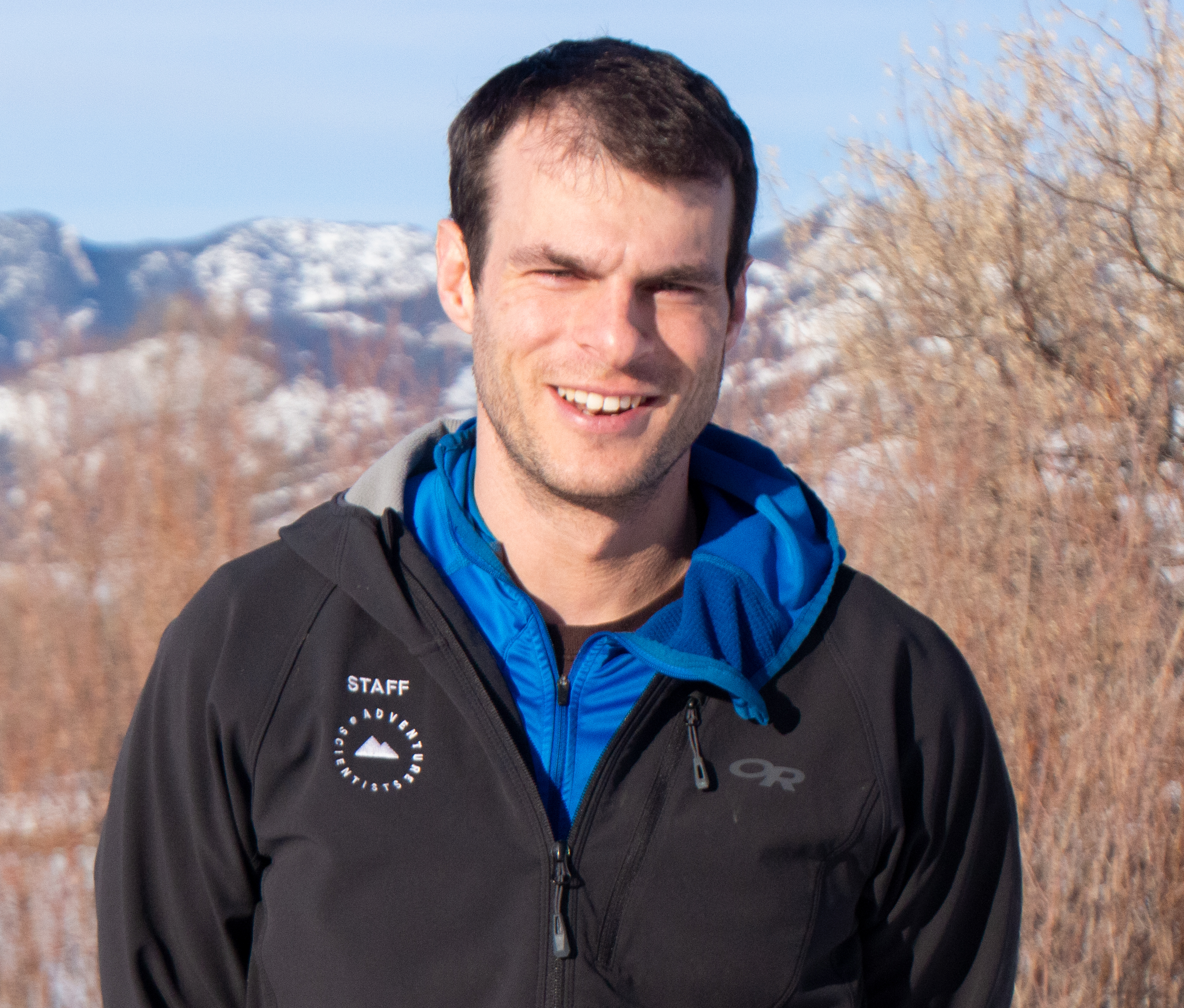
Gregg Treinish in Bozeman, MT, March 2020

== Background ==
Gregg was born and raised in Cleveland, Ohio. He says he felt like an outsider as a child, unable to fit into friend groups and bristling in the confines of the classroom. At age 16, after years of struggling with school suspensions and self-doubt, he joined a backpacking and sea kayaking trip in British Columbia. That experience, and the empowerment he felt in the mountains, lifted him from despair.

In 2004, Treinish thru-hiked the 2,174-mile Appalachian Trail. Several years later, he and filmmaker Deia Schlosberg spent 22 months trekking 7,800 miles along the spine of the Andes Mountains, for which National Geographic named them 2008 Adventurers of the Year.

After returning from the Andes, Treinish worked as a wildlife biologist, studying species such as grizzly bears, lynx, owls and sturgeon. Combining his love of exploration and science, he led and participated in expeditions tracking wolverines in Mongolia, testing animal migration corridors in the northern Rockies, and documenting wildlife in the Okavango Delta in Botswana.

Treinish became increasingly cognizant that many outdoor adventurers like him benefited so much from nature that they felt compelled to give back. In 2011, he founded Adventure Scientists, which mobilizes outdoor enthusiasts to use their unique skills to collect scientific data from difficult-to-access locations and across vast areas of the globe. The nonprofit recruits, trains and manages these volunteer adventurers to collect high quality data that enable scientists to advance conservation and human health.

He earned a bachelor's degree in sociology at University of Colorado Boulder in 2002, and a second bachelor's degree, in biology, from Montana State University in 2009. He continues to live in Bozeman, Montana, where he and his wife are raising their two children.

== Honors ==
Five years after naming him an Adventurer of the Year, National Geographic inducted Treinish into their 2013 Emerging Explorer class for his work with Adventure Scientists. He has been listed as one of Christian Science Monitor's "30 under 30," as a Backpacker Magazine "Hero", as a Draper Richards Kaplan Entrepreneur, as one of Men's Journal's "50 Most Adventurous Men," and as a Grist 50 "Fixer." Gregg was awarded the Ashoka Fellowship in 2017 for his work on environmental conservation and stewardship. In 2020, he was named a Young Global Leader by the World Economic Forum.
