= Richard P. Turco =

American atmospheric scientist

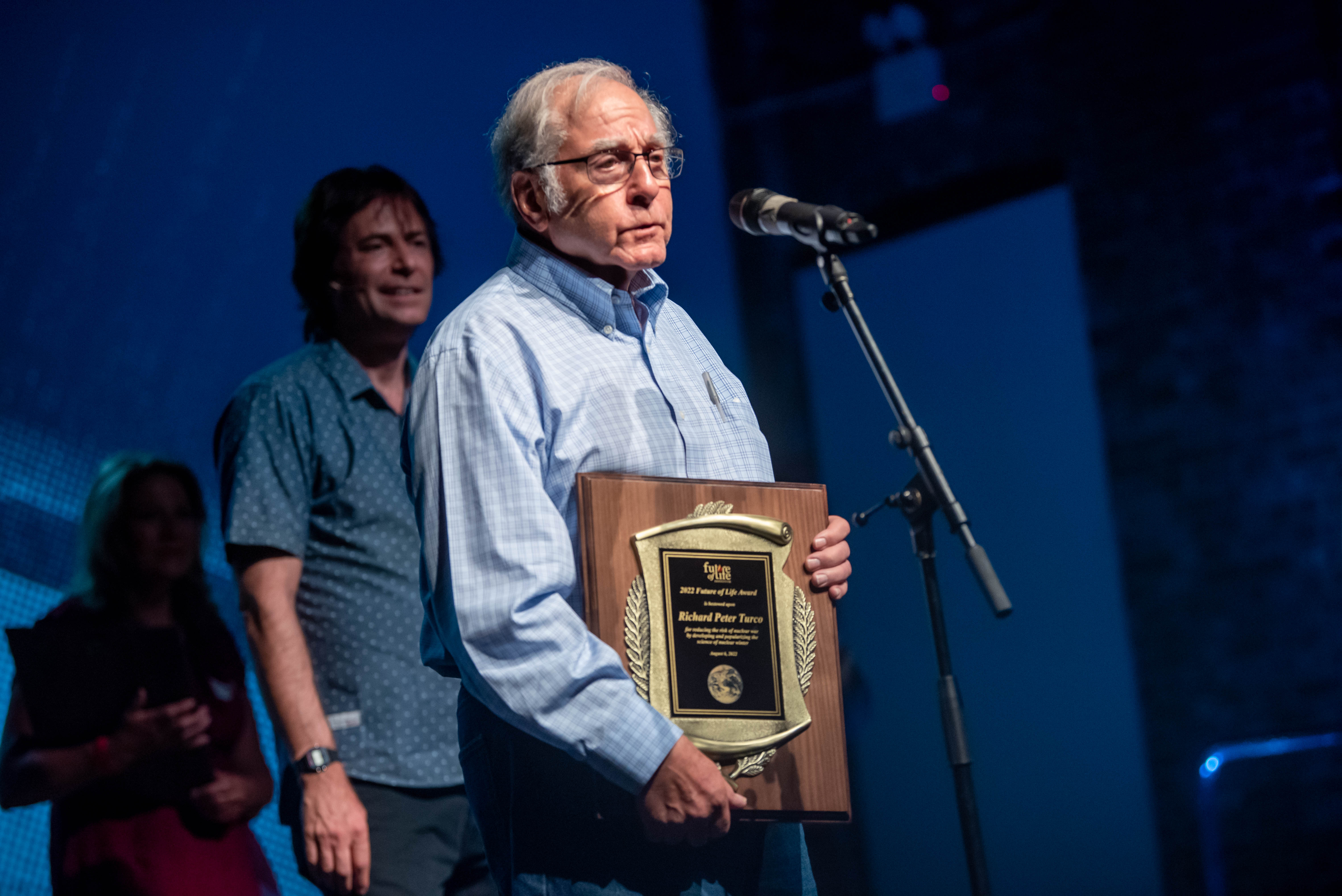
- Born: 1943 (age 82–83)
- Education: Rutgers University; University of Illinois
- Scientific career
- Workplaces: University of California, Los Angeles
- Doctoral students: Mark Z. Jacobson
- Website: www.atmos.ucla.edu/~turco/

Richard Peter "Rich" Turco (born 1943) is an American atmospheric scientist, and Professor at the Institute of the Environment, Department of Atmospheric and Oceanic Sciences, University of California, Los Angeles. He won an award in 1986, from MacArthur Fellows Program.

Turco was lead author of a prominent paper published in 1983 in Science that reported computer calculations of the reduction of solar irradiance at the surface of the Earth, due to absorption of radiation by smoke that would result from a putative large-scale nuclear exchange. The phenomenon, which became known as nuclear winter, garnered much public attention.

In 2018 the American Geophysical Union established the "Future Horizons in Climate Science: Turco Lectureship" through a donation by Richard P. and Linda S. Turco. The lectureship highlights signal research on climate change through noteworthy lectures by recognized leaders in the field.

In 2022. Turco was presented with the Future of Life Award for "reducing the risk of nuclear war by developing and popularizing the science of nuclear winter."

== Works ==
- "Evolution of an impact-generated dust cloud and its effects on the atmosphere", Toon, O. B.; Pollack, J. B.; Ackerman, T. P.; Turco, R. P.; Mckay, C. P.; Liu, M. S., Geological implications of impacts of large asteroids and comets on the earth (A84-25651 10-42) Boulder, CO, Geological Society of America, January 1, 1982, p. 187-200.
- A Path Where No Man Thought: Nuclear Winter and the End of the Arms Race, Carl Sagan and Richard P. Turco, 1990 Random House, New York ISBN 0-394-58307-8.
- "Nuclear Winter in the Post-Cold War Era", Carl Sagan and Richard P. Turco, Journal of Peace Research, Vol. 30, No. 4 (Nov., 1993), pp. 369–373
- "Recent Assessments of the Environmental Consequences of Nuclear War", The Medical implications of nuclear war, Volume 1985, Editors Fredric Solomon, Robert Q. Marston, National Academies, 1986
- "Atmospheric Chemistry", Climate system modeling, Editor Kevin E. Trenberth, Cambridge University Press, 1992, ISBN 978-0-521-43231-3
- Earth under siege: from air pollution to global change, Oxford University Press, 1997, ISBN 978-0-19-507286-0
