= Seventh Art Releasing =

American entertainment company and film distributor

- Company type: Film distribution
- Industry: Film
- Founded: 1994
- Founders: Udy Epstein and Jonathan Cordish
- Headquarters: Los Angeles, California, United States
- Website: 7thart.com

Seventh Art Releasing (also known as 7th Art Releasing) is an American entertainment company and film distributor founded in 1994 by Udy Epstein and Jonathan Cordish. The company specializes in the release and sale of documentaries and independent films through traditional and modern outlets including theatrical and non-theatrical distribution, film festivals, cable and television, home video, and video-on-demand.

== Releases ==
The company is known for distributing award-winning documentaries and fiction films, having a catalog of over 500 films, many dealing with Jewish culture, lesbian and gay issues, world affairs, human rights, music, and popular culture. Seventh Art Releasing has also provided worked with companies including HBO, MGM, PBS, Discovery Channel, A&E, Virgin Records, and Universal Music Group to provide press, event, and release services.

== Recognition ==
Several titles released by the company have been nominated for Academy Awards and Emmys, such films including Transit, Balseros, Chau, Beyond the Lines, 50 Children: The Rescue Mission of Mr. and Mrs. Kraus, Incident in New Baghdad, and Long Night's Journey into Day. Other films, such as 45365, The Aggressives, Love During Wartime, Word Wars, Portrait of Wally, and Under Great White Northern Lights have premiered at Sundance Film Festival, South by Southwest, and Tribeca Film Festival.
