= Colgate Maroon-News =

Newspaper in Hamilton, New York

The Colgate Maroon-News
- Type: Weekly newspaper
- Format: Tabloid
- Founded: 1868
- Headquarters: Student Union, 13 Oak Drive Hamilton, New York 13346, United States
- Circulation: 2,250
- Website: thecolgatemaroonnews.com

The Colgate Maroon-News is the student newspaper of Colgate University in Hamilton, New York. It is the oldest college weekly in America, having been founded in 1868 as Madisonesis. The current editors-in-chief for Volume CLIX are Chloe Liversidge and Joshua Repp.

== History ==
The newspaper traces its origins back to 1846, when Hamilton Student was founded by student and abolitionist George Gavin Ritchie as "a semi-monthly mirror of Religion, Literature, Science and Art." The newspaper was shut down and Ritchie expelled by the college, then called Madison University, after he published an editorial criticizing New York residents for opposing African-American male suffrage, though he continued to publish the Hamilton Student as "The Hamilton Student and Christian Reformer."

For over two decades, there was no official student newspaper for the university. In 1868, Colgate restarted the campus newspaper under the name Madisonesis, and the modern staff considers this as its official foundation. The newspaper's name was officially changed to the Colgate Maroon in 1916. An independent paper, the Colgate News, emerged in 1969, as a less liberal alternative to the official student newspaper. The newspaper takes its current name from the merger of the two campus weeklies in 1991.

== Circulation ==
The Colgate Maroon-News has a circulation of 2,250 print copies, which are distributed around campus, the Village of Hamilton, and to subscribing alumni.

== Staff ==
In a typical year, The Colgate Maroon-News has approximately 75 student members.
