= Floris White Bull =

Native American activist and writer

- Floris Ptesáŋ Huŋká
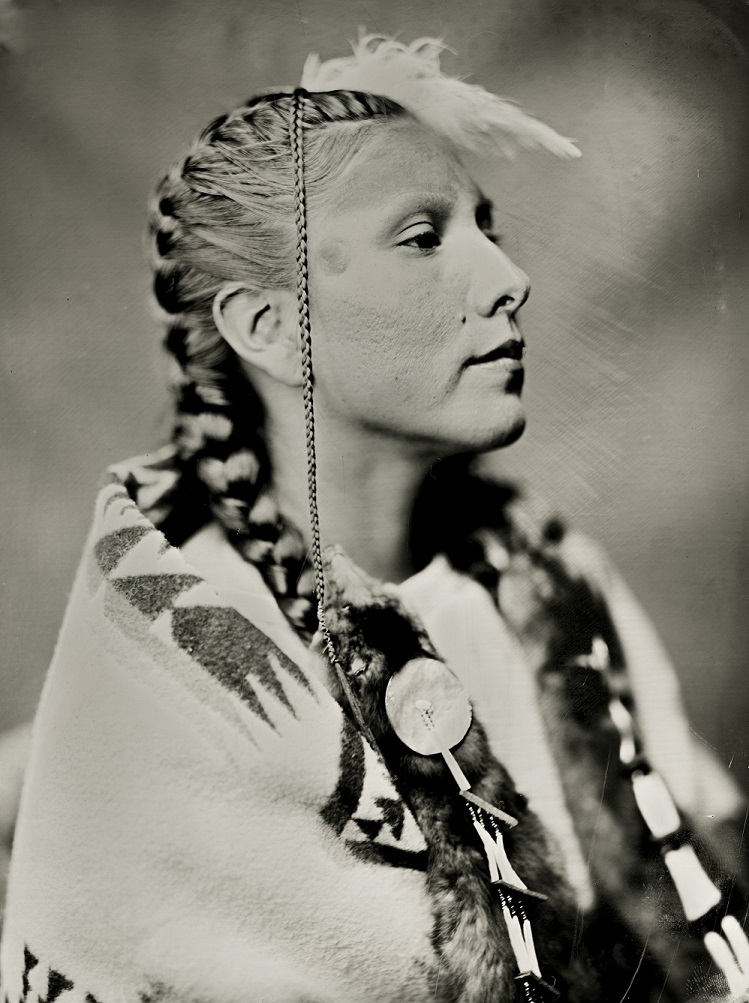
- White Bull, 2016
- Born: 1981 or 1982 (age 43–44)
- Citizenship: Standing Rock Lakota Nation
- Known for: Activism
- Notable work: Awake: A Dream From Standing Rock (2017 documentary, co-writer & narrator)
- Family: White Bull

Floris White Bull (born 1981 or 1982) is a Native American activist and writer.

A descendant of Chief White Bull, she grew up on Standing Rock Reservation, and was arrested for protesting at the Dakota Access Pipeline in 2016.

She co-wrote and narrated the 2017 documentary Awake: A Dream From Standing Rock.

== Early life and education ==
White Bull was born in 1981 or 1982, a descendant Chief White Bull. She grew up with her sisters in the Standing Rock Reservation.

White Bull is a member of the Standing Rock Lakota Nation. Her Indigenous name is Floris Ptesáŋ Huŋká.

== Adult life ==
White Bull is an activist who was one of the early protestors at the Dakota Access Pipeline and on October 27, 2016, she was one of 142 people arrested by Morton County police at the protest.

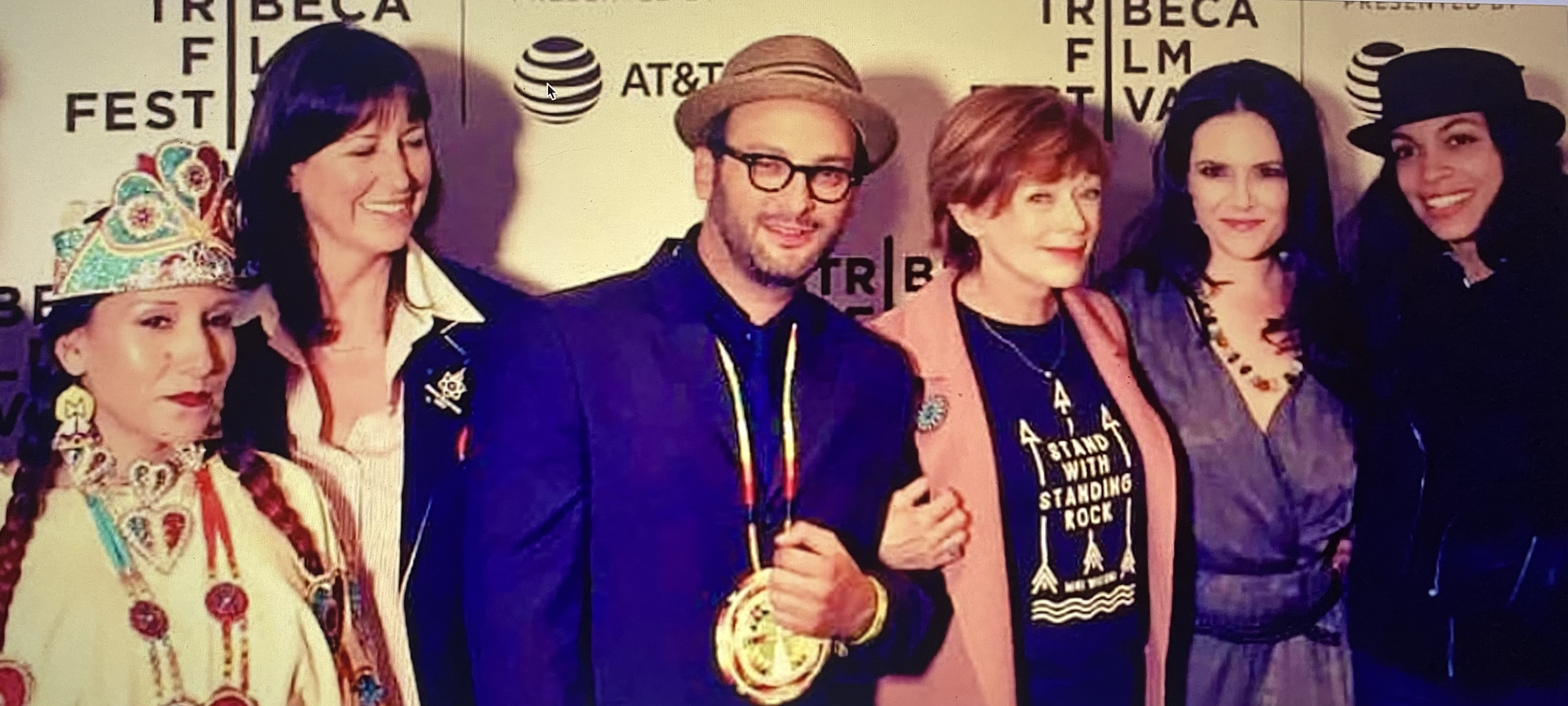
White Bull, (left) at Tribeca Film Festival in 2017

She was the co-writer of the 2017 documentary Awake: A Dream From Standing Rock and the narrator of the first section of the film. In the first of the documentary's three sections she discusses the path of the pipeline and its proximity to the Missouri River.

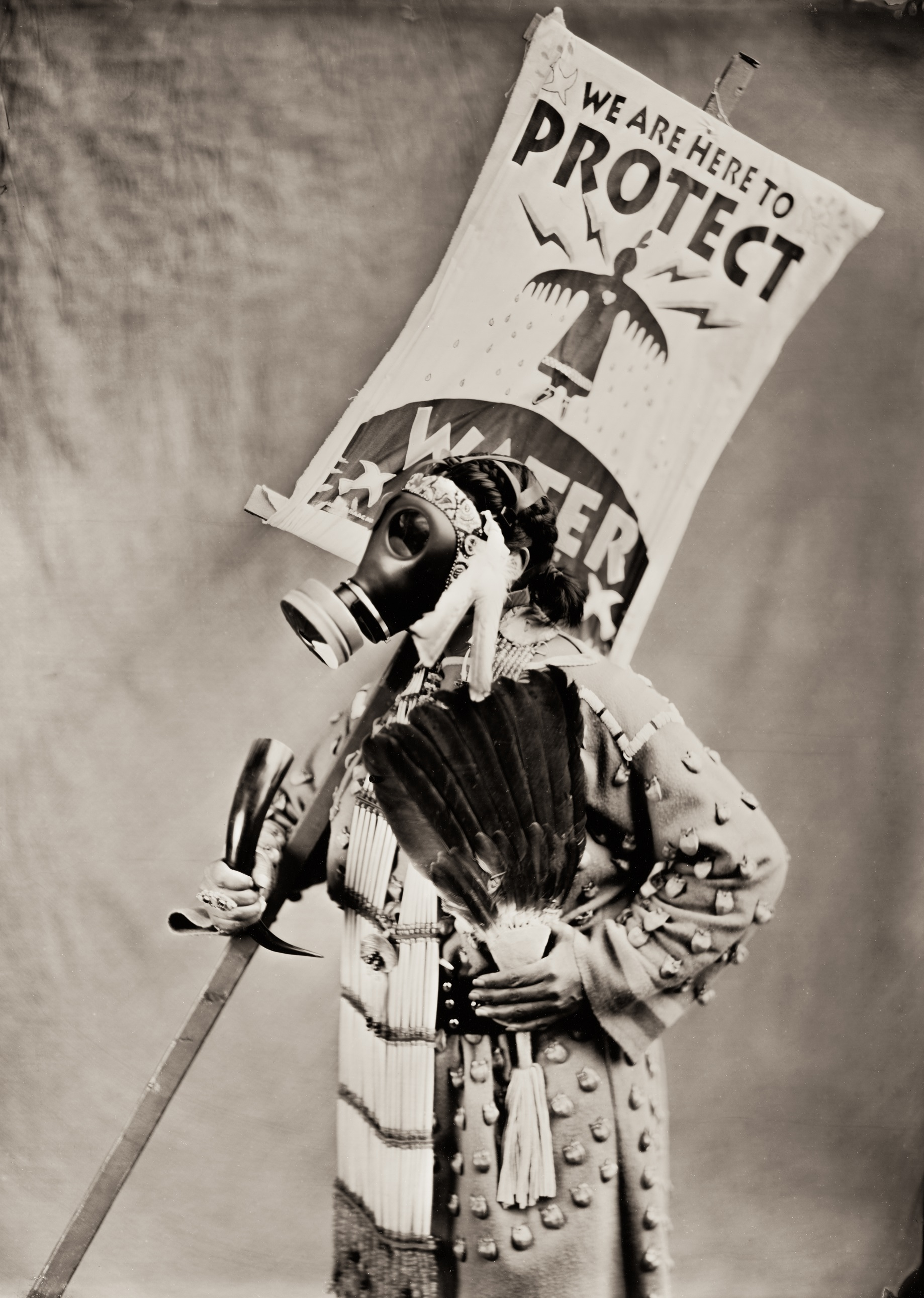
White Bull in 2018

== Personal life ==
White Bull is a mother.

She reported that she suffered from post-traumatic stress disorder, after her arrest at the protest.
