= Myron Dewey =

Native American filmmaker and journalist (1972–2021)

- Ahu-auh-bud-shoe-knaw-me
- Born: July 16, 1972
- Died: September 26, 2021 (aged 49); Near Yomba Nye County, Nevada
- Citizenship: Walker River Paiute Tribe
- Education: Haskell Indian Nations University, University of Kansas
- Occupations: Filmmaker, citizen journalist, academic
- Employer(s): Duke University and Northwest Indian College
- Notable work: Awake: A Dream From Standing Rock (2017 documentary, co-director)
- Spouse: Deborah Parker

Myron Charles Dewey (16 July 1972 – 26 September 2021) was a filmmaker and journalist from the Walker River Paiute Tribe.

Dewey was noted for reporting on issues at the Standing Rock Sioux Reservation especially for co-directing the 2017 documentary Awake: A Dream From Standing Rock.

== Early life ==
Dewey was born on 16 July 1972, to parents Herbert Dini Jr. of Schurz, Nevada and Cynthia Dewey of Bishop, California. A member of the Walker River Paiute Tribe, his Indigenous name was Ahu-auh-bud-shoe-knaw-me.

He attended Gabbs K-12 School and studied computer systems and business information at Haskell Indian Nations University, graduating with a degrees in each in 2002 and 2003. He later attended the University of Kansas and graduated with a master's degree in Indigenous nation studies in 2007.

== Career ==
Dewey was employed by the Bureau of Indian Affairs' as a firefighter working for their Western Nevada One team in Carson City before joining their Black Mountain Hotshot Crew working in the Western United States. He founded Digital Smoke Signals online news service. Later, he worked as an academic, teaching film-making at Duke University's Center for Documentary Studies and at Northwest Indian College in Washington state.

In 2016, Dewey filmed the protests at the Dakota Access Pipeline and was a co-director of the documentary Awake: A Dream From Standing Rock working with Josh Fox and James Spione. While gathering footage, his use of drone filming attracted accusations of criminality form authorities, later dismissed. In 2017 he won an award at the New York City Drone Film Festival in the category of News/Documentary for his work filming police at the protest site.

In 2018, he won an Award of Merit from the University of Kansas Department of Film & Media Studies.

== Personal life and death ==
Dewey lived in Schurz, Nevada, in the Walker River Paiute Reservation. He lived with his wife Deborah Parker, their five children, and his one nephew.

Dewey died near Yomba, Nye County two to three hours after a car crash on 26 September 2021, aged 49. Dewey had been returning from broadcasting at the Fallon bombing range in Nevada when he died.

On June 6, 2023, John Walsh of Nevada was sentenced to 30 days in jail after pleading guilty to vehicular manslaughter.
