= How to Let Go of the World and Love All the Things Climate Can't Change =

- Directed by: Josh Fox
- Written by: Josh Fox
- Starring: Josh Fox
- Narrated by: Josh Fox
- Music by: The Beatles, Radiohead, Gabriel Mayers, Christian Frederickson, Machine Fabriek
- Distributed by: HBO, International WOW Company, Multitude Media
- Release date: April 20, 2016 (U.S.)
- Running time: 129 minutes
- Country: United States
- Language: English

How to Let Go of the World (And Love All the Things Climate Can't Change) is a 2016 environmental documentary by Josh Fox that premiered at the 2016 Sundance Film Festival.
