= Tom Rand (venture capitalist) =

Canadian writer

- Born: 1967 (age 58–59); Canada
- Occupations: Green technology venture capitalist, author
- Years active: 2005-present

Tom Rand (born 1967) is a Canadian venture capitalist and author. He founded the clean-tech advisor at MaRS Discovery District in Toronto and is Co-Founder and Managing Partner at the privately backed ArcTern Ventures. He also sits on the boards of a number of clean-energy companies and organizations, including Environmental Defence Canada.

Rand is a part-owner of Planet Traveler, a hostel in Toronto, named North America's greenest hotel. He is also known for his advocacy for the "green bonds" policy.

== Education ==
Rand holds a bachelor's degree in electrical engineering from the University of Waterloo, a master's degree in philosophy of science from the University of London/London School of Economics, and a master's degree and Ph.D. in philosophy from the University of Toronto.

== Career ==
In 2005, Rand started the VCi Green Funds, with capital from the sale of the Voice Courier group of companies, to provide angel and venture capital to companies developing emission-reduction technologies. He is currently the company's director. In 2009, he became the clean-tech practice lead at MaRS Discovery District, where he remains a senior advisor. He is also a managing partner of ArcTern Ventures, a fund that provides early-stage risk capital to the most promising MaRS clean-tech companies, and he sits on the boards of Morgan Solar, Hydrostor, Polar Sapphire, Woodland Biofuels, MMB Research, Environmental Defence Canada, and Cape Farewell. In 2018 ArcTern launched its Fund II, backed by OMERS and Equinor (formerly Statoil).

In 2007, Rand and his business partner Anthony Aarts began renovations on an abandoned building in Toronto, which in January 2011 became the Planet Traveler hotel. The building was retrofitted to use geothermal and solar thermal electricity, LED lighting, and drain-water heat recovery. Planet Traveler was the first building in Toronto to arrange for geothermal piping to be laid under city-owned property.

In 2008, as an Action Canada fellow, Rand led the "green bonds" policy team. While the policy has not been implemented in Canada, it has been incorporated into the platforms of Canada's Liberal Party and British Columbia's New Democratic Party.

Rand has appeared on Canadian TV shows and is a frequent public speaker on the science, politics, and economics of climate change, as well as clean technology, venture capital, and innovation. He is a regular contributor on The Exchange with Amanda Lang.

== Writing ==
Rand has written three books: Kick The Fossil Fuel Habit: 10 Clean Technologies to Save Our World, Waking the Frog: Solutions for our Climate Change Paralysis and (upcoming March 2020) The Case for Climate Capitalism: Economic Solutions for a Planet in Crisis. Kick the Fossil Fuel Habit won the White Pine Award for nonfiction in 2012. Waking the Frog was a top 10 best-seller (nonfiction) in Canada in 2014. Rand is also the author of a number of op-eds in the Canadian Business Journal, the Toronto Star, and The Globe and Mail. He argues that climate disruption is a major threat to sustained economic well-being and global food security.

== Awards ==
On June 12, 2013, Rand received Earth Day Canada's Outstanding Commitment to the Environment Award. The organization's president, Jed Goldberg, said at the time, "Tom's work in promoting solutions to address climate change is legendary. He has facilitated the investment of tens of millions of dollars to those who have designed innovative technologies and processes that address the planet's most pressing environmental challenges, and he has built a most impressive example of energy efficiency in his Planet Traveler hostel."
