= Josh Fox =

American film director

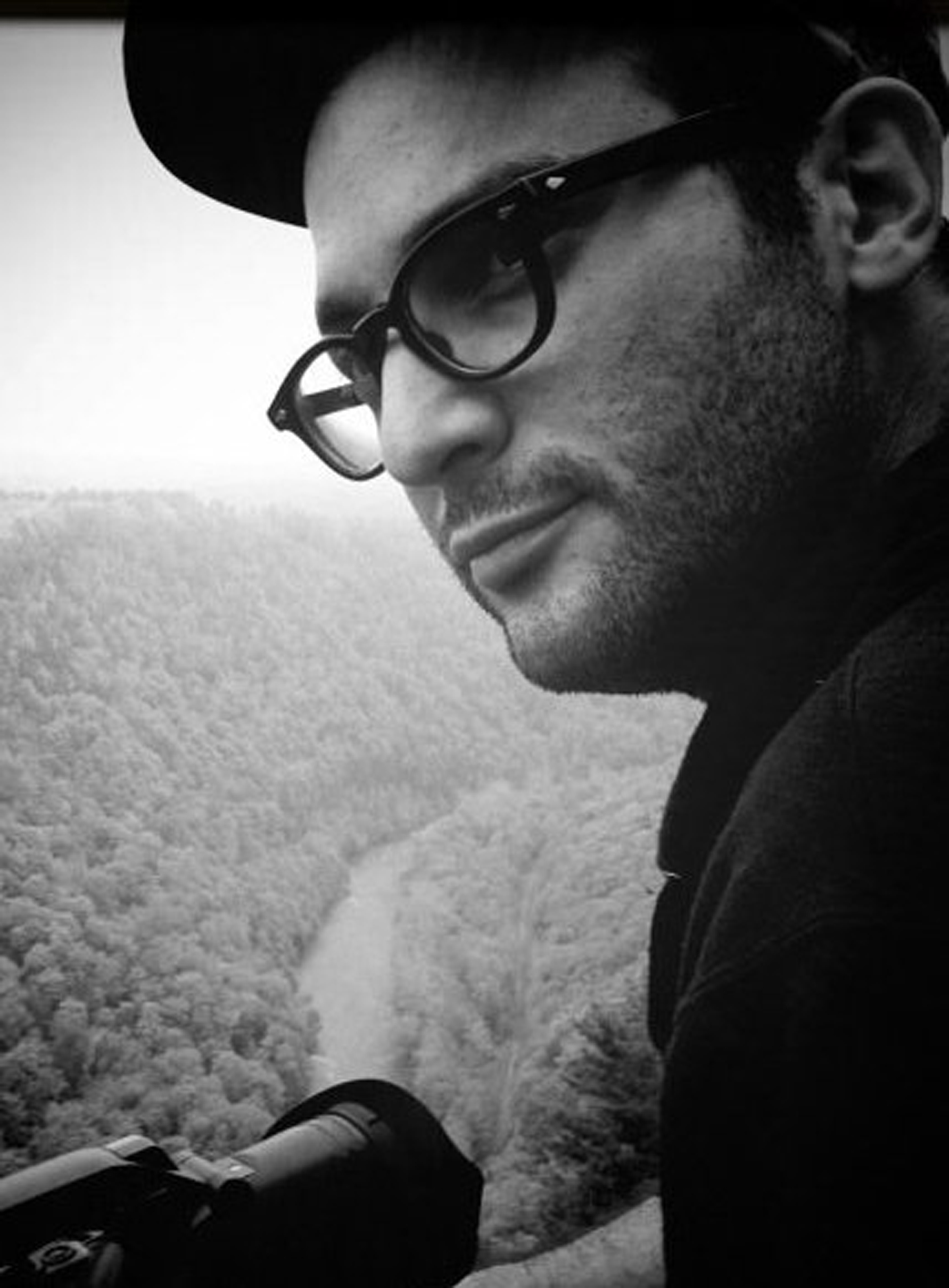
- Fox in 2017
- Born: New York City, U.S.
- Occupations: Filmmaker, environmental activist, playwright, theatre director
- Known for: Gasland (2010), Gasland Part 2 (2013), How to Let Go of the World (And Love All the Things Climate Can't Change) (2016), "Awake, A Dream from Standing Rock" (2017)
- Awards: Primetime Emmy for Best Directing Documentary, Oscar Nomination, Lennon/Ono Grant for Peace, Sundance Special Jury Prize
- Website: joshfoxfilm.com

Josh Fox is an American film director, playwright, and environmental activist, best known for his Oscar-nominated, Emmy-winning 2010 documentary, Gasland. He is the founder and artistic director of a film and theater company in New York City, International WOW, and has contributed as a journalist to Rolling Stone, The Daily Beast, NowThis, AJ+ and Huffington Post.

== Early life and education ==
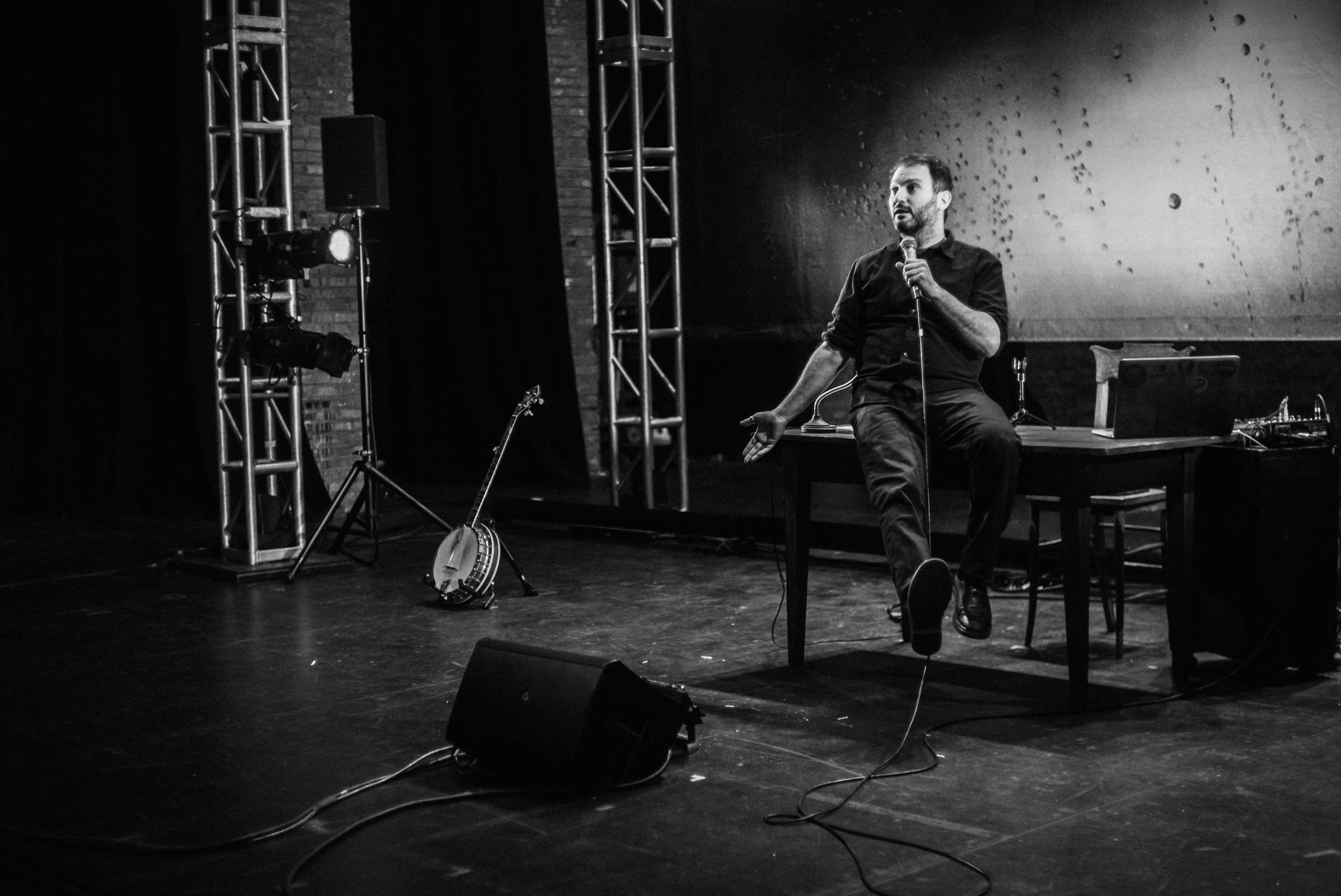
Josh Fox rehearsing The Truth Has Changed, NYC January 2020

Fox was born July 24, 1972 in New York City and lived there and Milanville, Pennsylvania through high school. He is Sephardic Jewish on his father's side and Calabrese Italian on his mother's side. His father was a displaced person, a Jewish refugee and an infant survivor of the holocaust, arriving in New York City when he was 8 years old. He went to PS 6 in New York City, Wagner Junior High School and Columbia Preparatory School for High School. He attended Oberlin College for two years and then transferred to Columbia University, majoring in theater, and graduated in 1995.

His band, The 3rd Degree, which he co-founded at age 14 with Noah Shachtman was a staple of the NYC Ska scene in the late 1980s, playing often at CBGB's and other downtown NYC venues until their breakup in 1991. After dropping out of Oberlin College, Fox worked as an actor in Chicago in the early 1990s, and was featured in plays including Drunkboat with Tracy Letts, Jim True and Michael Shannon at Steppenwolf theater, Goose and TomTom by David Rabe at the Theater Building, and The Love of the Nightingale directed by Amy Landecker at the Next Theater. Beginning in 1994, Fox trained with Anne Bogart, and SITI Company members Ellen Lauren, Will Bond, Stephen Webber and Barney O’Hanlon in Viewpoints, Suzuki and Composition.

== Artistic career ==
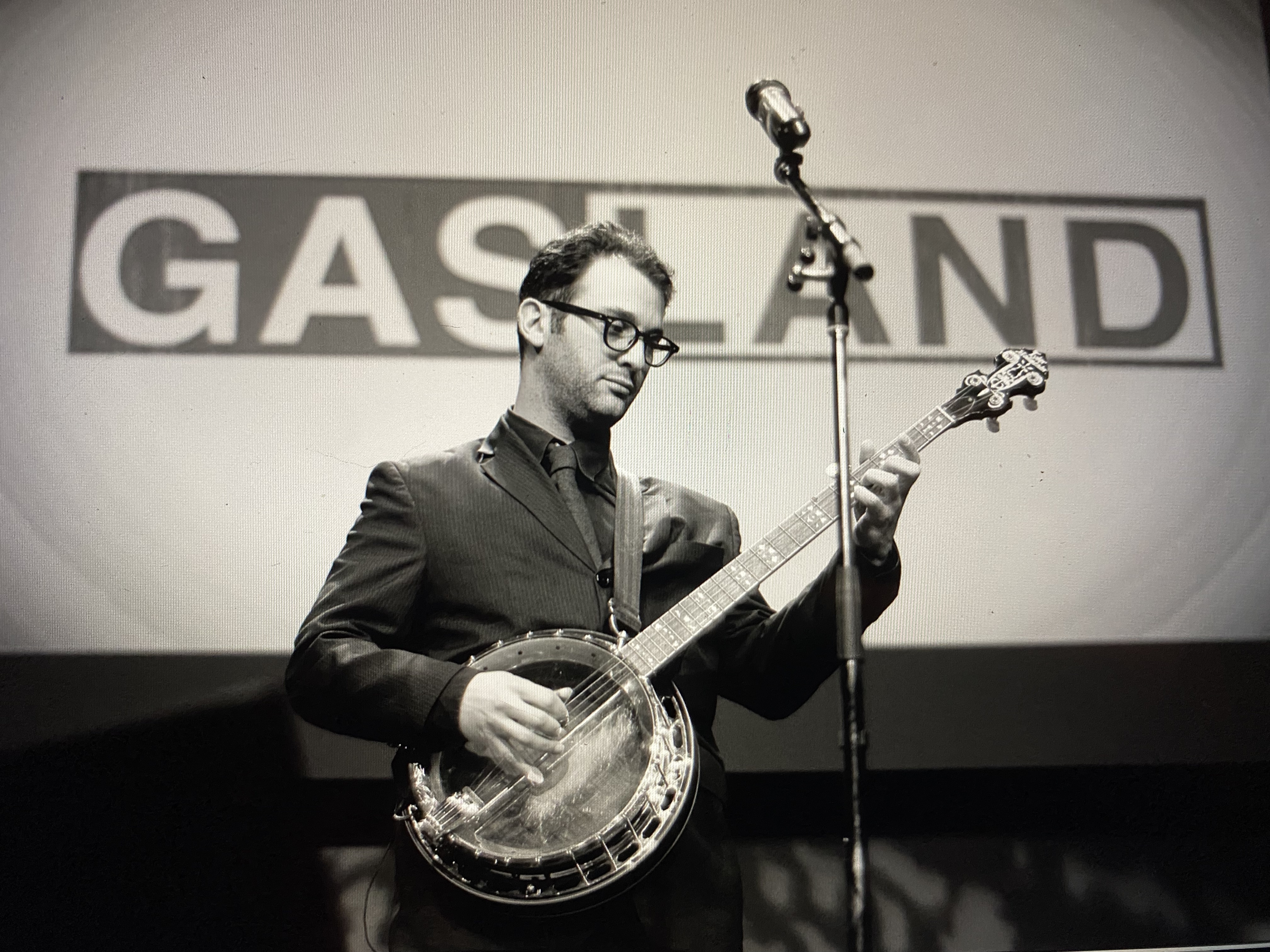
Fox giving a TED talk in West Vancouver, British Columbia

Fox founded the film and theatre company International WOW Company in Chiang Mai, Thailand with a group of performers from New York City and Asia. He has written and directed over 30 plays with his ensemble. Works include ?WOW! (1996), This is Not the Ramakian (1997), Stairway to the Stars (1999), HyperReal America (2001), The Bomb (2002), Orphan on God's Highway (2002), Death of Nations Parts 1-4 (2003-6), The Comfort and Safety of Your Own Home (2004),The Expense of Spirit (2004), Limitless Joy (2005), Surrender (2008), and Solutions Grassroots (2014). In addition, Fox has written, directed, and produced seven feature films, and over 25 short films, which have premiered in New York, Asia and Europe. The New York Times has hailed him as “one of the most adventurous impresarios of the New York avant-garde” and Time Out NY called him “one of downtown’s most audacious auteurs,” citing his “brilliantly resourceful mastery of stagecraft.”

In addition, Fox has participated as an actor, director, designer and writer in international theater collaboration projects in Japan, Thailand, the Philippines and Germany. He starred as David Conde in Yoji Sakate's Emperor and Kiss performed by the Rinko Gun company, along with Kameron Steele, marking the first time that the company worked with a western performers. He was also the first western performer to work with Pappa Tarahumara dance/theatre company, creating roles for WD (2001) and The Sound of Future Sync (2002) which performed at the Setagaya Public Theatre and the New National Theatre in Tokyo. He created Heimwehen, Death of Nations Part V (2006) with Frank Raddatz, the former dramaturg of Heiner Muller, for the Forum Freies Theatre in Düsseldorf. Fox was a collaborator of Filipino playwright, actor and screenwriter Rody Vera in the early 2000s.

In 2008, Fox directed his first narrative feature film, Memorial Day, an examination of American party culture, the Iraq War and torture which was executive produced by Jim McKay and Michael Stipe of R.E.M. In 2010, he wrote, directed, and produced Gasland, one of the first major films about the environmental impacts of fracking. Gasland premiered at the Sundance Film Festival in competition, winning the critics poll and the Special Jury Prize for Documentary. The film is widely credited as galvanizing the anti-fracking movement worldwide, making fracking a household word. Fox later produced an HBO sequel Gasland Part II, which aired July 2013 and was released on DVD in January 2014.

On October 1, 2015, Fox's mini-documentary GasWork, which detailed hazardous working conditions in the hydraulic fracturing oil and gas drilling industry, debuted on All In with Chris Hayes.

In 2016, Fox directed How to Let Go of the World and Love All the Things Climate Can't Change, a personal take on climate change, the film features figures on climate change such as Bill McKibben, Michael Mann, Van Jones, the Pacific Climate Warriors, and Elizabeth Kolbert. Fox was awarded his third Environmental Media Association award for Best Documentary for his film How to Let Go of the World and Love All the Things Climate Can't Change, which premiered at the Sundance Film Festival in 2016, toured the world theatrically and was released on HBO in June 2016.

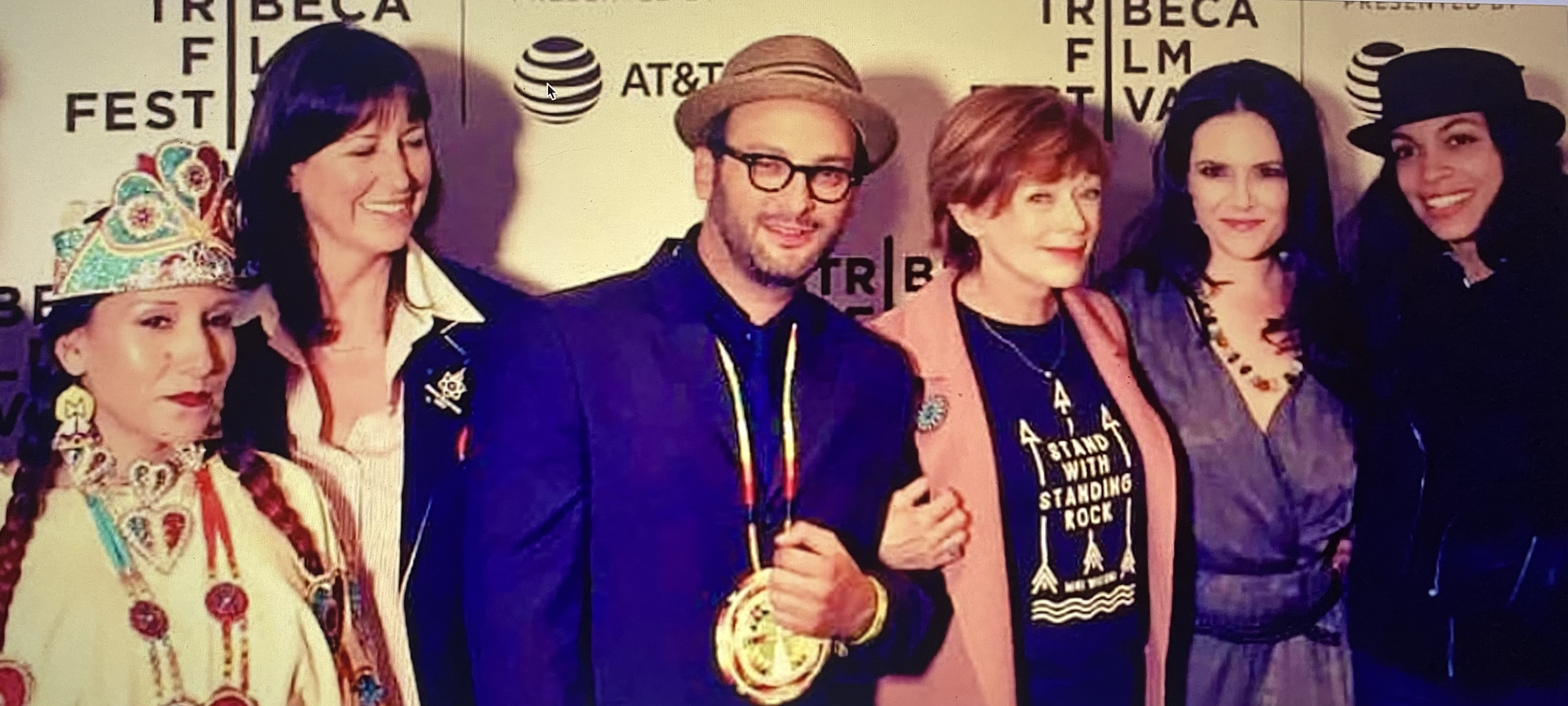
Josh Fox, Lauren Taschen, Floris White Bull, Frances Fisher, Rosario Dawson, Nomiki Konst at the Awake, A Dream from Standing Rock premiere at Tribeca Film Festival( 2017)

In 2017, he produced, co-directed and co-wrote AWAKE, A DREAM FROM STANDING ROCK with indigenous filmmakers Doug Good Feather and Myron Dewey, which premiered at the Tribeca Film Festival on Earth Day, launched on Netflix and toured around the world. In 2018 he co-founded the AWAKE MEDIA FELLOWSHIP for indigenous youth with leaders Stephanie Cassidy, Doug Good Feather and others.

In 2018, Fox created The Truth Has Changed, a solo performance, book and film about misinformation, propaganda and psycho-graphic targeting aimed at manipulating our current media and political ecosystem. In the performance he tells of his frontline reporting with an emphasis on the smear campaigns waged against him for nearly a decade by the fossil fuel industry. The project has toured to over 25 cities in the US and Europe and has been seen by thousands of people in support of dozens progressive, environmental and grassroots organizations. The Truth Has Changed is Fox's first book, published by Seven Stories Press. In January 2020 The Public Theater abruptly ended Fox's run on The Truth Has Changed following a dispute with the theater. Fox and International WOW Company staff including producer Diane Crespo alleged that Public Theater staff had physically attacked Fox while preparing for a show. Fox also alleged that festival director Mark Russell was verbally abusive to him before shows. Fox and the company submitted formal written complaints about code of conduct violations and while pursuing these complaints the show's run of three remaining shows was halted. Fox was asked to meet with Public Theater Artistic Director Oskar Eustis and associate artistic director Shanta Thake months later in hopes of finding a reconciliation wherein Ms Thake remarked "mistakes were made" by the Public Theatre staff. The feature film version of The Truth Has Changed was released in 2021.

In March 2020, during the covid lockdown Fox launched Staying Home with Josh Fox a nightly interview program featuring guests from the world of politics, cinema, and music. Guests on the program included Cory Bush, Marc Ribot, Kim Stanley Robinson, Preston Reed, Jamie Margolin, Rebekah Jones among others. The show ran for more than 200 episodes on The Young Turks network in 2020 and 2021.

In 2023 premiered THE EDGE OF NATURE, a feature film about the anthropause, the moment during the covid lockdowns in 2020 where fossil fuel emissions decreased, having a measurable impact on the climate and pollution of the planet and the Byron Bay Film Festival where it won best Environmental Film. In 2024 Fox premiered the project at La Mama Experimental Theater Club as a performance and film that you watch at the same time. Fox performed the narration of the film live as well as playing the musical score by Dougie Bowne & Fox with songs by Pete Seeger, with an ensemble of 12 musicians. The performances received rave reviews and support from notable people such as Bernie Sanders, Steven Donziger and Sean Lennon

== Activism ==
Fox is known for his opposition of hydraulic fracturing, or fracking. He has campaigned for a ban on fracking and against the gas industry's exploitation of loopholes in the Clean Water act and the Safe Drinking Water Act.

In 2011 Fox co-founded The Solutions Project Fox was forcibly removed from the board in 2016 by Ruffalo and Executive Director Sarah Shanley Hope after he complained the organization was too heavily dependent on celebrity. All founders except Ruffalo were removed from the board in subsequent years. In 2021, The Solutions Project accepted 43 million dollars from Jeff Bezos and the Bezos Earth Fund an action which was condemned by Fox as helping to greenwash Bezos and the large carbon footprint and unfair labor practices of Amazon.

In February 2012 Fox was arrested during a U.S. House of Representatives subcommittee hearing on hydraulic fracturing when he attempted to videotape the proceedings.

Josh was advisor to Artists Against Fracking, Damascus Citizens and other organizations involved in the successful fight to ban fracking in New York State and the Delaware River Basin. Fox's films have toured to hundreds of cities worldwide helping to form the global movement against fracking.

In 2016, he worked as a surrogate for Senator Bernie Sanders as the Creative Director for Our Revolution and as a member of the campaign's NY Platform Committee. He worked alongside Bill McKibben, Nina Turner, Ben Jealous, Jane Kleeb and Dr. Cornel West to pass an amendment to the Democratic Platform which addressed carbon pricing, the phasing out of natural gas power plants, community involvement, and adopting the Keystone XL climate standard for all federal energy projects.

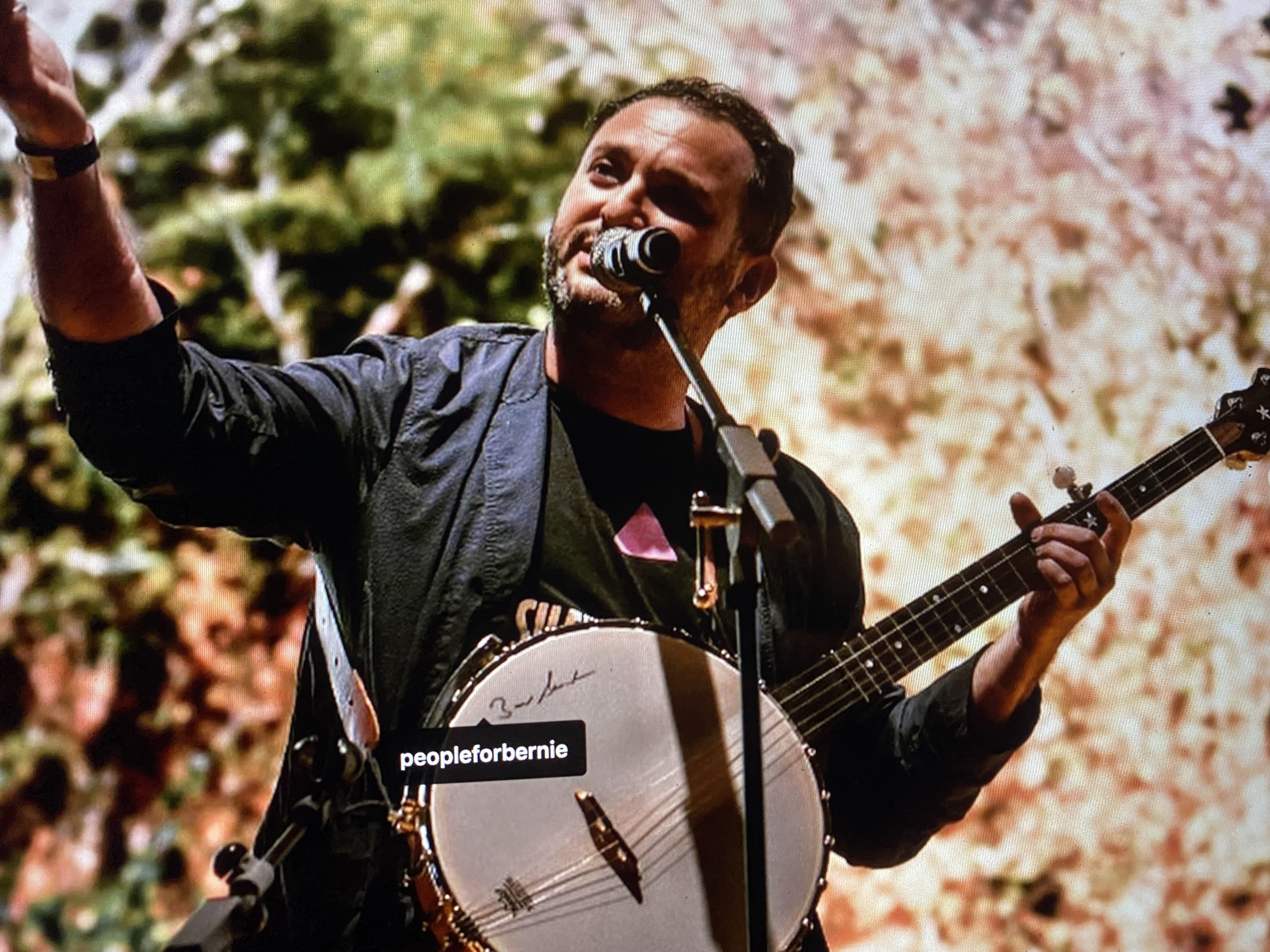
Josh Fox performs at WDCD Mexico CIty 2021

== Personal life ==
In 2008, Fox's family was offered $100,000 in order to allow a natural gas fracking company to use his land in northern Pennsylvania. Fox set out to learn more about the fracking industry. After doubting some of the natural gas company's claims, he went on a mission to research them further, crossing the country visiting other gas fields. His experiences lead to his anti-fracking activism.

In January 2020, Fox contracted Covid after completing his run of The Truth Has Changed in New York City. He began experiencing neurological symptoms from Long Covid in March 2020 and suffered symptoms until October 2021. He created the film The Edge of Nature documenting his experiences healing from the disease while living in a one room cabin in the woods of Pennsylvania. Excerpts from The Edge of Nature film were performed live by Fox at the What Design Can Do conference in Mexico City and Amsterdam. The feature film premiered on opening night at the Byron Bay International Film Festival in Australia in October 2023. Fox told The Guardian that he was fully healed from Long Covid but that there are valuable lessons to be learned from the experience.

== Awards and nominations ==
Fox was awarded the 2010 LennonOno Grant for Peace by Yoko Ono.

Gasland premiered at the 2010 Sundance Film Festival, where it was awarded the 2010 Special Jury Prize for Documentary. It was also nominated for Best Documentary Screenplay by the WGA and was awarded the Environmental Media Association Award for Best Documentary.

Fox was nominated for the 2011 Academy Award for Best Documentary Feature Film for Gasland. He won the 2011 Primetime Emmy for Best Nonfiction Directing, in addition to three other Primetime Emmy nominations that year.

Gasland Part II premiered on HBO July 8, 2013 won the 2013 Environmental Media Association award for Best Documentary, the Best Film at the Wild and Scenic Film Festival, and the Hell Yeah Prize from Cinema Eye honors. It was nominated for a 2013 News and Documentary Emmy.

How to Let Go of the World and Love All the Things Climate Can't Change premiered at the Sundance Film Festival in 2016, and won the Environmental Advocacy award at the Washington DC Environmental Film Festival. The film was awarded the 2016 Environmental Media Association Award for Best Documentary, Fox's third consecutive win in that category.

For his theatre work, Fox has received five grants from the National Endowment for the Arts, five MAP Fund Grants, a Drama Desk Award Nomination, and an Otto Award.

The Truth has Changed won best film at the Transitions Film Festival and the Montauk Film Festival in 2022. "The Edge of Nature" won best Environmental Film at Byron Bay Film Festival and the F. Lammot Belin Award for excellence at the NEPA Film Festival in 2023 and took home three awards at FilmAmbiente in Rio de Janeiro, Best Film, Best Director and the Audience Award.

== Filmography ==
- Memorial Day (2008) – directed
- Gasland (2010) – directed, wrote, produced
- The Sky is Pink (short) (2012) – directed, wrote, produced, co-editor (with Matt Sanchez)
- Gasland Part II (2013) – directed, wrote, produced
- Gaswork: The Fight for CJ's Law (short) (2013)
- How to Let Go of the World and Love All the Things Climate Can't Change (2016) – directed, wrote, produced
- Awake: A Dream From Standing Rock (2017) – co-directed, co-wrote, produced
- Staying Home with Josh Fox (2020–21)
- The Truth Has Changed (2021) – written, directed
- The Trouble with Rebekah Jones (2022) – written, directed (Unreleased)
- The Edge of Nature (2025) - written, directed, produced, music
- The Welcome Table (December, 2026 HBO) – written, directed

== Works for the Stage ==
- ?WOW! (1996) – conceived, directed
- American Interference (1997) – conceived, directed
- This is NOT the Ramakian (1997) – conceived, directed
- The Sleeping and The Dead (1998) – conceived, directed
- Stairway to The Stars (1999) – conceived, directed
- HyperReal America (2001) – conceived, directed
- Soon My Work (2001) – written, directed
- THE BOMB (2002) – conceived, directed
- Orphan on God's Highway (2002) – conceived, directed
- Death of Nations Parts 1-5 - THE TRAILER, THE THAI PLAY, HEIMWEHEN, HOW TO LET GO OF THE SUN (2003-2006) – conceived, directed
- The Comfort And Safety of Your Own Home (2004) – conceived, directed
- The Expense of Spirit (2004) – written, directed
- Limitless Joy (2005) – written, directed
- You Belong To Me (2006) – written, directed
- SURRENDER (2008) – written, directed
- RECONSTRUCTION (2010) – written, directed
- Solutions Grassroots (2014) – written, directed
- The Truth Has Changed (2020) – written, directed
- The Edge of Nature (2024) – written, directed, performed by

== See also ==
- Anti-fracking movement
- The Solutions Project
- Gasland
- How to Let Go of the World and Love All the Things Climate Can't Change
- Awake: A Dream From Standing Rock
- The Welcome Table (film)
