= Martin Kaltschmitt =

German engineer and professor

- Born: 18 April 1961 (age 65); Heidelberg, Germany
- Scientific career
- Fields: Renewable energy
- Workplaces: Technical University of Hamburg

Martin Kaltschmitt (engl.: 'Martin Coldsmith', born 18 April 1961) is a German engineer and professor at Hamburg University of Technology. He is head of the Institute of Environmental technology and Energy economics (Institut für Umwelttechnik und Energiewirtschaft) at Hamburg University of Technology.

== Life ==
After having studied drilling engineering at Clausthal University of Technology from 1981 to 1986, Kaltschmitt obtained his PhDs at Stuttgart University in 1990, researching the possibilities and limits of wind power and solar energy generation in Baden-Württemberg. In 1997 he successfully wrote a habilitation work about renewable energy use in Germany. After that he was assigned with King's College London, and University of California, Berkeley. From 2001 to 2008 he was director of Institut für Energetik und Umwelt, Leipzig. In 2006 he became head of the Institut für Umwelttechnik und Energiewirtschaft at Technical University of Hamburg.

From 2008 to 2010 he was scientific director of the German Biomass Research Center, Leipzig. He is a member of the Academy of Sciences and Humanities in Hamburg. In 2008 he was awarded the Medal of Honor of German Engineers Association Verein Deutscher Ingenieure.

Together with Hermann Hofbauer, Kaltschmitt is editor-in-chief of the scientific journal Biomass Conversion and Biorefinery, edited by Springer.

== Books (selection) ==
- Martin Kaltschmitt, Lieselotte Schebek (eds.), Umweltbewertung für Ingenieure. Methoden und Verfahren. Springer 2015, ISBN 978-3-642-36989-6.
- Martin Kaltschmitt, Wolfgang Streicher, Andreas Wiese (eds.): Erneuerbare Energien. Systemtechnik, Wirtschaftlichkeit, Umweltaspekte, 5th. edition, Springer 2013, ISBN 978-3-642-03248-6.
- Martin Kaltschmitt, Hans Hartmann, Hermann Hofbauer (eds.): Energie aus Biomasse. Grundlagen, Techniken und Verfahren, 2nd edition, Springer 2009, ISBN 978-3-540-85094-6.
- Martin Kaltschmidt, Wolfgang Streicher (eds.), Regenerative Energien in Österreich. Grundlagen, Systemtechnik, Umweltaspekte, Kostenanalysen, Potentiale, Nutzung, Vieweg+Teubner 2009, ISBN 978-3-8348-0839-4.
- Martin Kaltschmitt, Wolfgang Streicher, Andreas Wiese (eds.): Renewable energy. Technology, economics and environment, Springer, Berlin/Heidelberg 2007, ISBN 978-3-540-70947-3.
- Martin Kaltschmitt, Joachim Fischer, Ulrich Langnickel (eds.): Bioenergietrager in Kraft-Warme-Kopplungsanlagen, Berlin 2002, ISBN 3-503-07008-7.
- Martin Kaltschmitt, Ernst Huenges, Helmut Wolff (eds): Energie aus Erdwärme. Geologie, Technik und Energiewirtschaft, Stuttgart 1999, ISBN 3-342-00685-4.
- Martin Kaltschmitt, Guido A. Reinhardt (eds.): Nachwachsende Energieträger. Grundlagen, Verfahren, ökologische Bilanzierung, Wiesbaden 1997, ISBN 3-528-06778-0.
- Martin Kaltschmitt, Systemtechnische und energiewirtschaftliche Analyse der Nutzung erneuerbarer Energien in Deutschland, Stuttgart 1997 (habilitation).
- Martin Kaltschmitt, Manfred Fischedick, Wind- und Solarstrom im Kraftwerksverbund. Möglichkeiten und Grenzen, Heidelberg 1995, ISBN 3-7880-7524-4.
- Martin Kaltschmitt, Möglichkeiten und Grenzen einer Stromerzeugung aus Windkraft und Solarstrahlung am Beispiel Baden-Württembergs Stuttgart 1990 (PhD).

== Journal publications (selection) ==
- An-Ping Zeng, Martin Kaltschmitt: Green electricity and biowastes via biogas to bulk-chemicals and fuels: The next move toward a sustainable bioeconomy. In: Engineering in Life Sciences (2015), doi:10.1002/elsc.201400262.
- Britta Reimers, Burcu Özdirik, Martin Kaltschmitt: Greenhouse gas emissions from electricity generated by offshore wind farms. Renewable Energy 72, (2014), 428–438, doi:10.1016/j.renene.2014.07.023.
- Mario Rios, Martin Kaltschmitt, Bioenergy potential in Mexico—status and perspectives on a high spatial distribution. Biomass Conversion and Biorefinery 3, (2013), 239–254, doi:10.1007/s13399-013-0085-3.
- Jana Weinberg, Martin Kaltschmitt: Life cycle assessment of mobility options using wood based fuels – Comparison of selected environmental effects and costs. Bioresource Technology 150, (2013), 420–428, doi:10.1016/j.biortech.2013.08.093.
- Christina Wulf, Martin Kaltschmitt: Life cycle assessment of hydrogen supply chain with special attention on hydrogen refuelling stations. International Journal of Hydrogen Energy 37, (2012), 16711–16721, doi:10.1016/j.ijhydene.2012.03.028.
- Stephanie Frick, Martin Kaltschmitt, Gerd Schröder: Life cycle assessment of geothermal binary power plants using enhanced low-temperature reservoirs. Energy 35, Issue 5, (Mai 2010), 2281–2294, doi:10.1016/j.energy.2010.02.016.
