= Honorary =

An honorary position is one given as an honor, with no duties attached, and without payment. Other uses include:

- Honorary Academy Award, by the Academy of Motion Picture Arts and Sciences, United States
- Honorary Aryan, a status in Nazi Germany
- Honorary authorship, listing of uninvolved people as co-authors of research papers
- Honorary César, awarded by the Académie des Arts et Techniques du Cinema, France
- Honorary consul, an unpaid part-time diplomatic consul
- Honorary Goya Award, by the Academia de las Artes y las Ciencias Cinematográficas de España, Spain
- Honorary Police, unpaid police force in Jersey
- Honorary Prelate, a title used in the Catholic Church
- Honorary society (disambiguation), whose members are elected for meritorious conduct
- Honorary title, awarded as a mark of distinction
  - Honorary citizenship, awarded to aliens who have rendered service to the state
  - Honorary degree, academic degree awarded to someone not formally qualified to receive it
  - Honorary title (academic), an academic title such as honorary professor conferred by a university or professional body
- Honorary trust, a trust with neither a charitable purpose, nor a private beneficiary
- Honorary whites, a term that was used by the apartheid regime of South Africa

== See also ==
- Honor (disambiguation)
- Honorary title (disambiguation)
- Honorarium
- The Honourable
