= Honor society (disambiguation) =

An honor society is a private society that recognizes and promotes achievement in scholarship, leadership, service, research, or other areas of distinction.

Honor society may also refer to:

- Honor Society (band), an American pop-rock band
- Honor Society (film), a 2022 American coming-of-age comedy film

== See also ==
- Honour (disambiguation)
