= Honor (disambiguation) =

Honour (or honor in American English) is the quality of being honorable.

Honor or Honour may also refer to:

== People ==
- Honor (given name), a unisex given name, including a list of people with the name
- Honour (surname), English-language surname, including a list of people with the name

== Entertainment and media ==
- Honor (band), a Polish band
- Honour (book), 2012 novel by Elif Shafak
- Honour (Sudermann play), 1889 play by German playwright Hermann Sudermann
- Honour (Murray-Smith play), a 1995 play by Australian playwright Joanna Murray-Smith
- Honour (film), 2014 British film
- Honour (British TV series), 2020 television series
- Honour (South Korean TV series), 2026 television series
- "Honor" (The Walking Dead), a 2018 episode of The Walking Dead

== Education ==
- Latin honors, distinctions of academic degrees
- Honors student, student recognized for high achievement in their academics
- Honours degree, educational term with various meanings
- Honors colleges and programs, an undergraduate program providing exceptional scholars with supplemental or alternative curricular and non-curricular programs

== Other uses ==
- Honor (brand), a consumer electronics brand based in China
- Honor, Michigan, United States
- Honour (feudal barony), feudal barony in medieval England
- Honour (England), feudal land holdings in medieval England
- Honour (fief), a form of landholding throughout medieval Europe
- Honour (style), a pre-nominal honorific typically used for judges and mayors
- Honors (horse), a champion show horse
- Honor, a high-valued card in contract bridge
- Honors, in bridge scoring, a bonus for the holding of high-valued cards
- Honor, a fictional god-like being from the Cosmere fictional universe
- Honor of Kings, video game

== See also ==
- Honor system or trust system, a philosophical way of running a variety of endeavors
- Matter of Honour (disambiguation)
- Medal of Honor (disambiguation)
- Orders, decorations, and medals of Canada
- Honours of Scotland
- Orders, decorations, and medals of the United Kingdom
- Honours of the Principality of Wales
