= Hon =

Hon or HON may refer to:

== People ==
=== Given name ===
- Cho Hŏn (1544–1592), Joseon militia leader
- Ho Hon (1885–1951), North Korean politician

=== Surname ===
- Han (surname) (Chinese: 韩/韓), also romanized Hon
- Louis Hon (1924–2008), French footballer
- Priscilla Hon (born 1998), Australian tennis player

== Other uses ==
- Hon (Baltimore), a cultural stereotype of working-class women from Baltimore, Maryland, United States
- Cafe Hon, a restaurant in Baltimore
- Hon, Arkansas, a community in the United States
- Hands on Network, an American network of volunteer centers
- Health On the Net Foundation, a Swiss non-governmental organization
- Heroes of Newerth, a 2010 video game
- Høn Station, in Asker, Norway
- The HON Company, an American business furniture manufacturer
- Honduras at the Olympics
- Honeywell (NYSE stock symbol: HON), an American multinational corporation
- Honorary (disambiguation)
- The Honourable, an honorific styling
- Huron Regional Airport, in South Dakota, United States
- On (biblical figure) (or Hon), a minor biblical figure
- Hon, a term of endearment, short for "honey"
