= Honour (surname) =

Honour or Honor is a surname.

Notable people with the name Honour include:

- Brian Honour (born 1964), English footballer and manager
- George Honour (1918–2002), British submariner
- Hugh Honour (1927–2016), British art historian
- Janet Honour (born 1950), English athlete
- Vic Honour (1910–2001), Australian cricketer

Notable people with the name Honor include:

- Gareth Honor (born 1979), English rugby player
