= Herbert Cyril Thacker =

Canadian general (1870–1953)

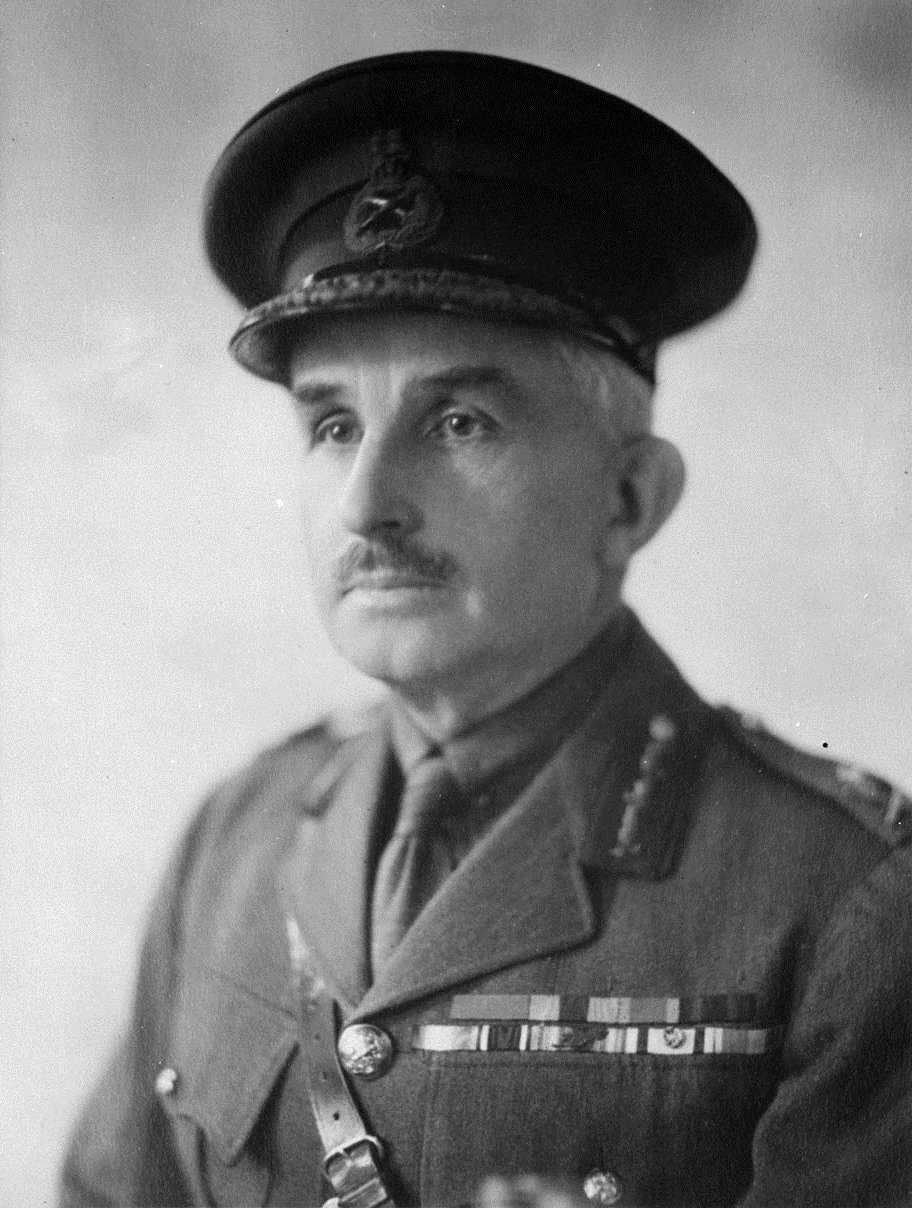
- Born: 16 September 1870; Poona, British India
- Died: 2 June 1953 (aged 82); Victoria, British Columbia, Canada
- Military career
- Allegiance: Canada
- Branch: Canadian Militia
- Service years: 1891–1929
- Rank: Major General
- Unit: Royal Canadian Artillery
- Commands: Chief of the General Staff
- Conflicts: Second Boer War; Russo-Japanese War; World War I
- Awards: Companion of the Order of the Bath; Companion of the Order of St Michael and St George; Distinguished Service Order; Order of the Sacred Treasure, Third Class; Japanese War medal

Major General Herbert Cyril Thacker CB, CMG, DSO (16 September 1870 – 2 June 1953) was a Canadian soldier and Chief of the General Staff, the head of the Canadian Militia (later the Canadian Army) from 1927 until 1929.

== Military career ==
Thacker was born the son of Major-General J. Thacker of the Bombay Staff Corps in 1870 in Poona, India. He attended Upper Canada College in Toronto and, in 1887, he graduated from the Royal Military College of Canada. Commissioned in the Royal Canadian Artillery in 1891, he conducted survey work in western Canada for the Canadian Pacific Railway. He was promoted to Lieutenant in 1893.

His service in the Second Boer War of 1900 in the Canadian Field Artillery led to the award of the Queen's medal with three clasps.

From 1904 to 1905 he had the unique Canadian assignment as a military attaché with the Japanese Army during the Russo-Japanese War but he was joined by other colonials. Along with other Western military attachés, Thacker had two complementary missions – to assist the Japanese and to observe the Japanese forces in the field during the Russo-Japanese War.

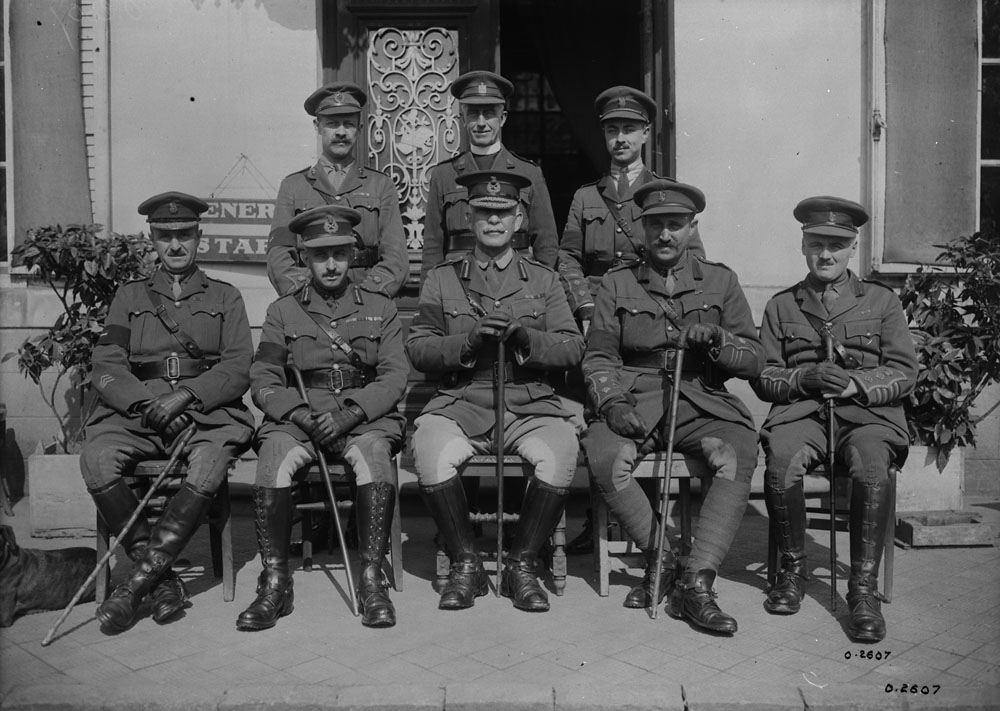
Major-General A. C. MacDonell and staff officers, 1st Canadian Division, sometime in 1918. (Front row, from left to right): Lieutenant-Colonel J. L. R. Parsons, Brigadier-General H. C. Thacker, Major-General A. C. Macdonnell, Lieutenant-Colonel J. Sutherland Brown, Colonel H. P. Wright. (Back row, from left to right): Lieutenant-Colonel H. F. H. Hertzberg, Hon. Lieutenant-Colonel F. G. Scott, Lieutenant J. M. Macdonnell.

In 1907, his appointment as director of artillery at Ottawa accompanied a promotion as commanding officer of the Royal Canadian Garrison Artillery (RCGA), and he became one of the 65 to live in the Commanding Officers’ Residence at Royal Artillery Park in Halifax. In 1911 he became Inspector of Coast Defense Artillery.

At the outbreak of World War I, Thacker joined the Canadian Expeditionary Forces (CEF), sailing for Europe with the 1st Canadian Division. Thacker went on to command the 2nd Canadian Divisional Artillery from 1914 to 1915. After General Sir Henry E. Burstall was promoted, Thacker, promoted to temporary brigadier general in June 1915, commanded the 1st Canadian Divisional Artillery from September 1915 through the end of World War and the CEF return to Canada.

After the war, Thacker was appointed the District Officer Commanding Military District 6, returning with his family to live at Royal Artillery Park. His career was capped with service as Chief of the General Staff from 1927 to 1929.

Thacker retired from military service in 1929. He died in Victoria, British Columbia, in June 1953.

== Honors ==
For his service in the Boer War, Thacker was awarded the Queen's Medal with three clasps (1900).

He was awarded the Order of the Sacred Treasure, Third Class by the Japanese government for his services during the Russo-Japanese War. He also received the Japanese War medal for service during that campaign.

For service in World War I, he was made a Companion of the Order of Saint Michael and Saint George (CMG) in 1916. Thacker was appointed to the Distinguished Service Order (DSO) in 1918. He was created a Companion of the Order of the Bath (CB) in 1919.

== See also ==
- Library and Archives Canada: CEF Attestation paper

Military offices
Preceded by Sir James MacBrien	Chief of the General Staff; 1927–1929	Succeeded by Andrew McNaughton
