= Ernesto Burzagli =

Italian Navy admiral and senator

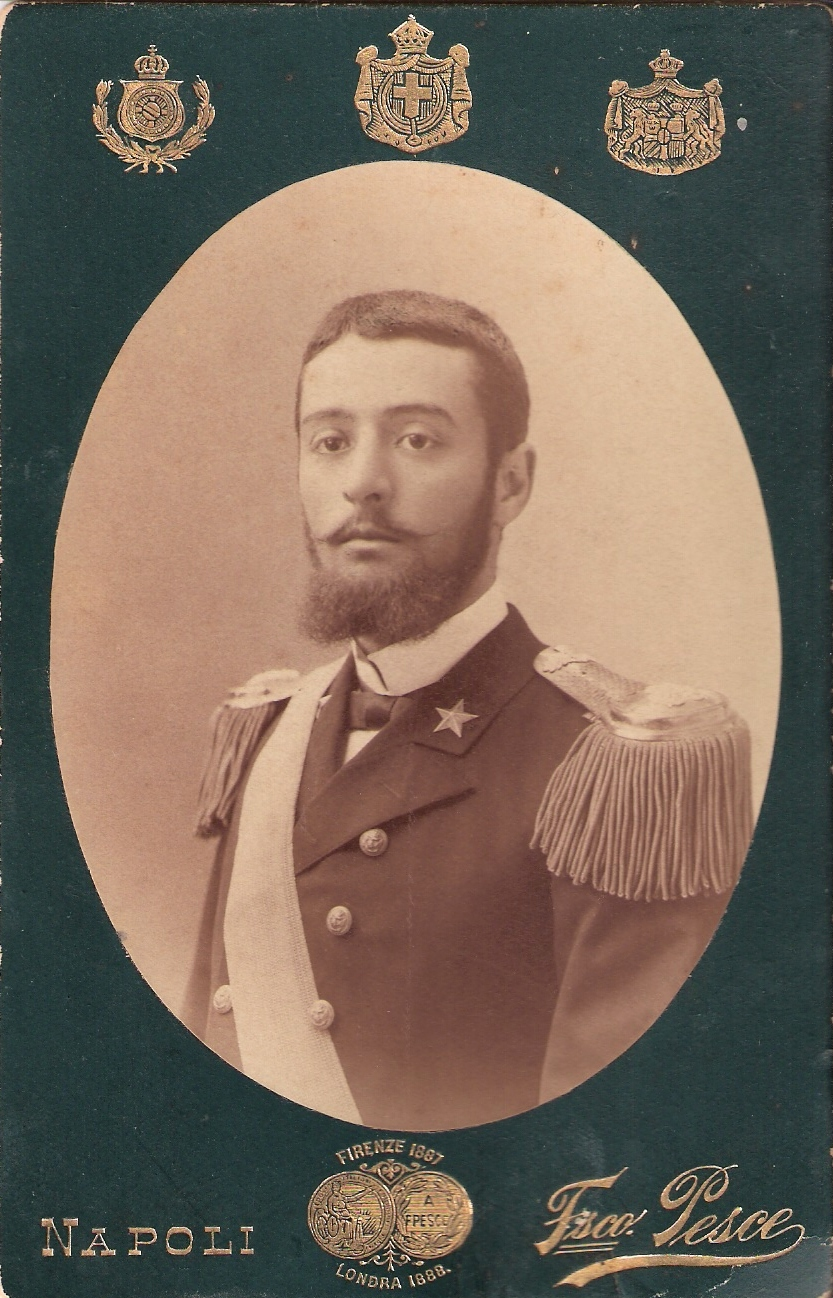
- Burzagli as a young officer
- Born: 7 June 1873; Modena, Italy
- Died: 13 September 1944 (aged 71); Montevarchi, Italy
- Military career
- Allegiance: Kingdom of Italy
- Branch: Regia Marina
- Service years: 1892–1931
- Rank: Admiral
- Conflicts: World War I

Ernesto Burzagli CB GCMM GOA (7 June 1873 – 13 September 1944) was a prominent figure in the Kingdom of Italy during the early 20th century. During a lifetime career in the Italian Royal Navy (Regia Marina Italiana), he rose to the rank of admiral and chief of staff. In 1933, King Victor Emmanuel III appointed Burzagli as a senator in Rome.

Despite his life service to the state, Burzagli was arrested in 1944 after clashing with Italian dictator Benito Mussolini. Although he was released a short time later, Burzagli was forced to withdraw from public life.

== Early years ==
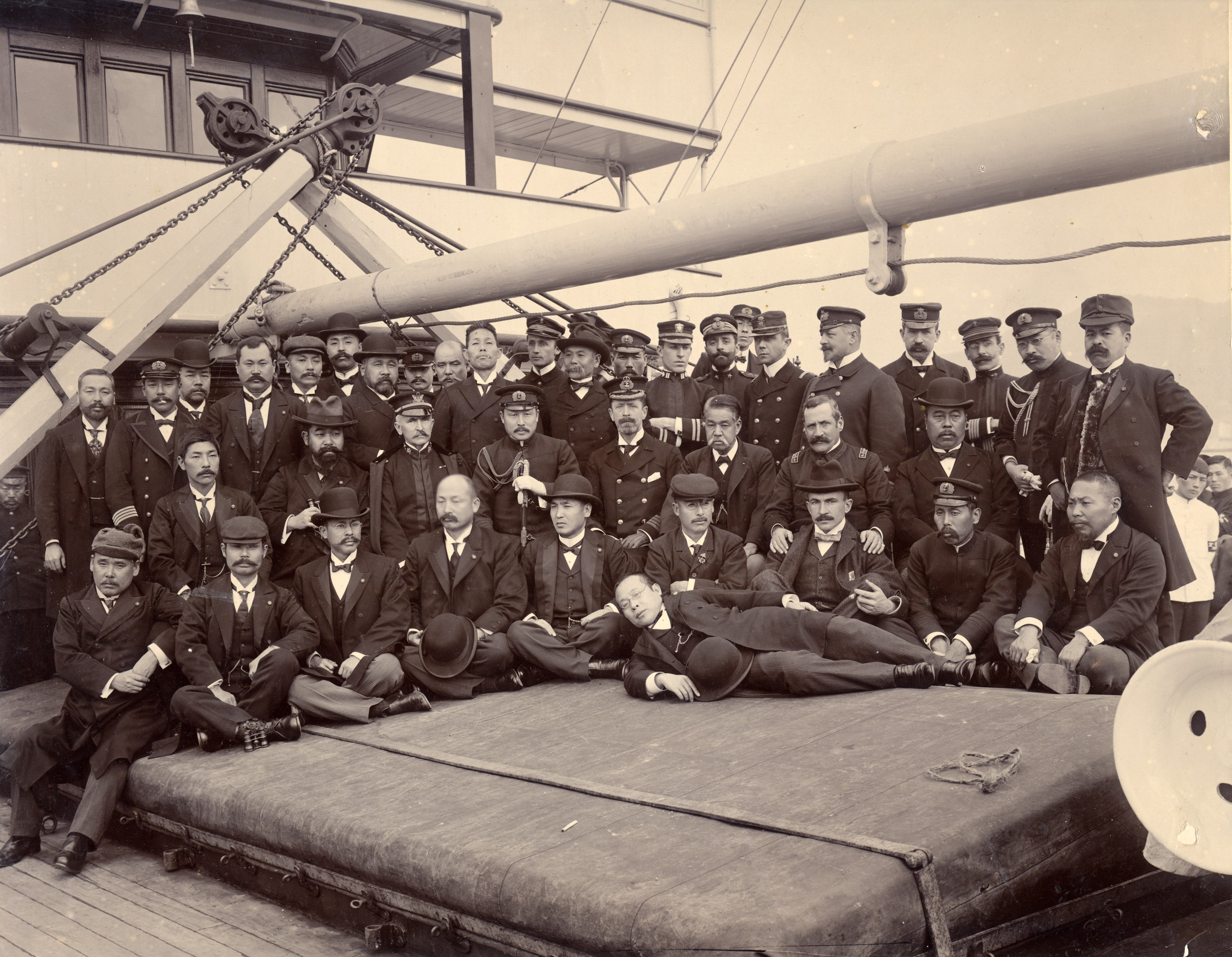
Aboard a Japanese naval vessel in Yokohama harbor before sailing to the Battle of Port Arthur (1904).

Burzagli entered the Italian Naval Academy (Accademia Navale) in Leghorn (Livorno in Italian) in 1887, and he was commissioned as an ensign in 1892.

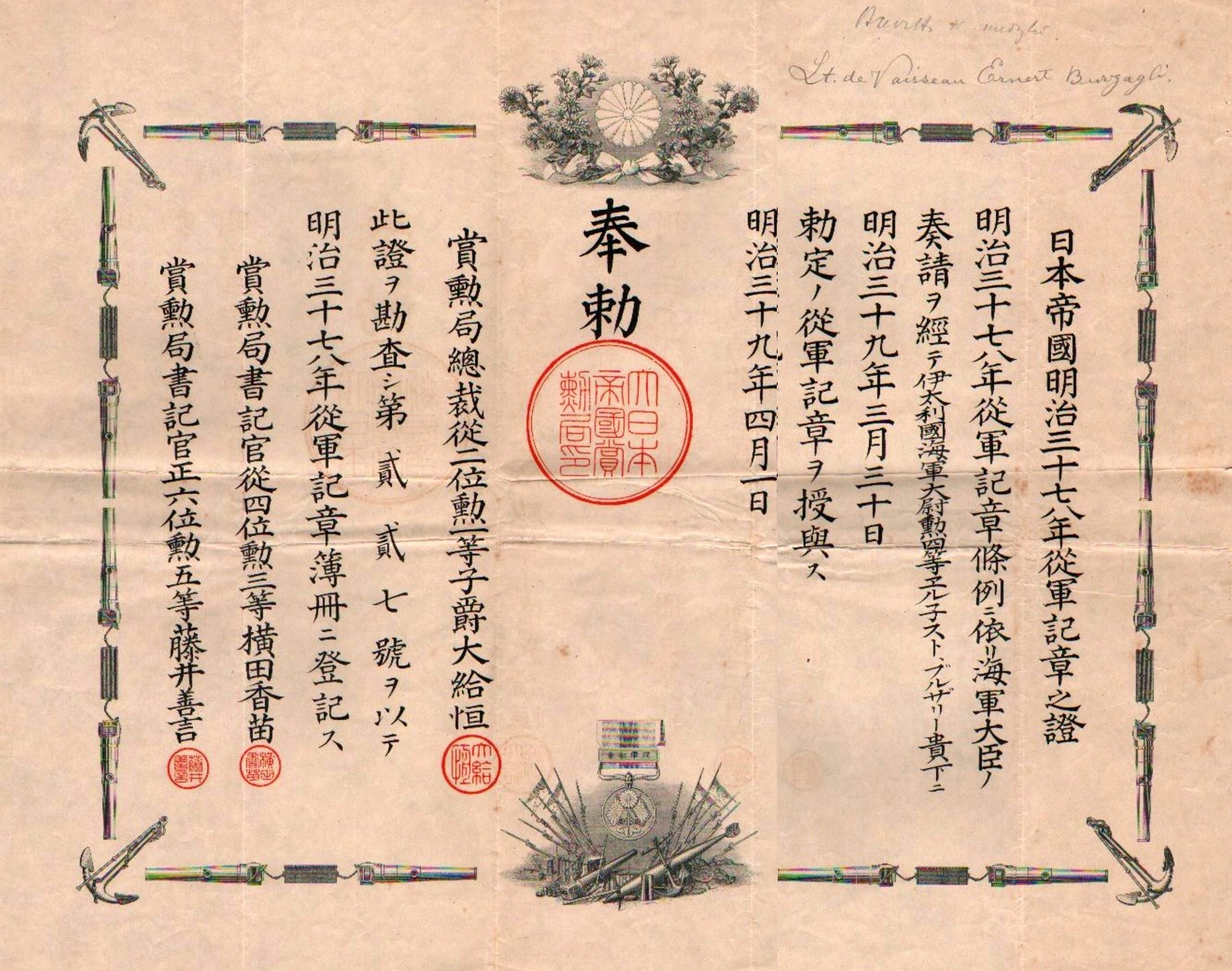
Japanese certificate acknowledging Burzagli's observer participation as Italian naval attaché serving with the Imperial Japanese Navy (1904-1906).

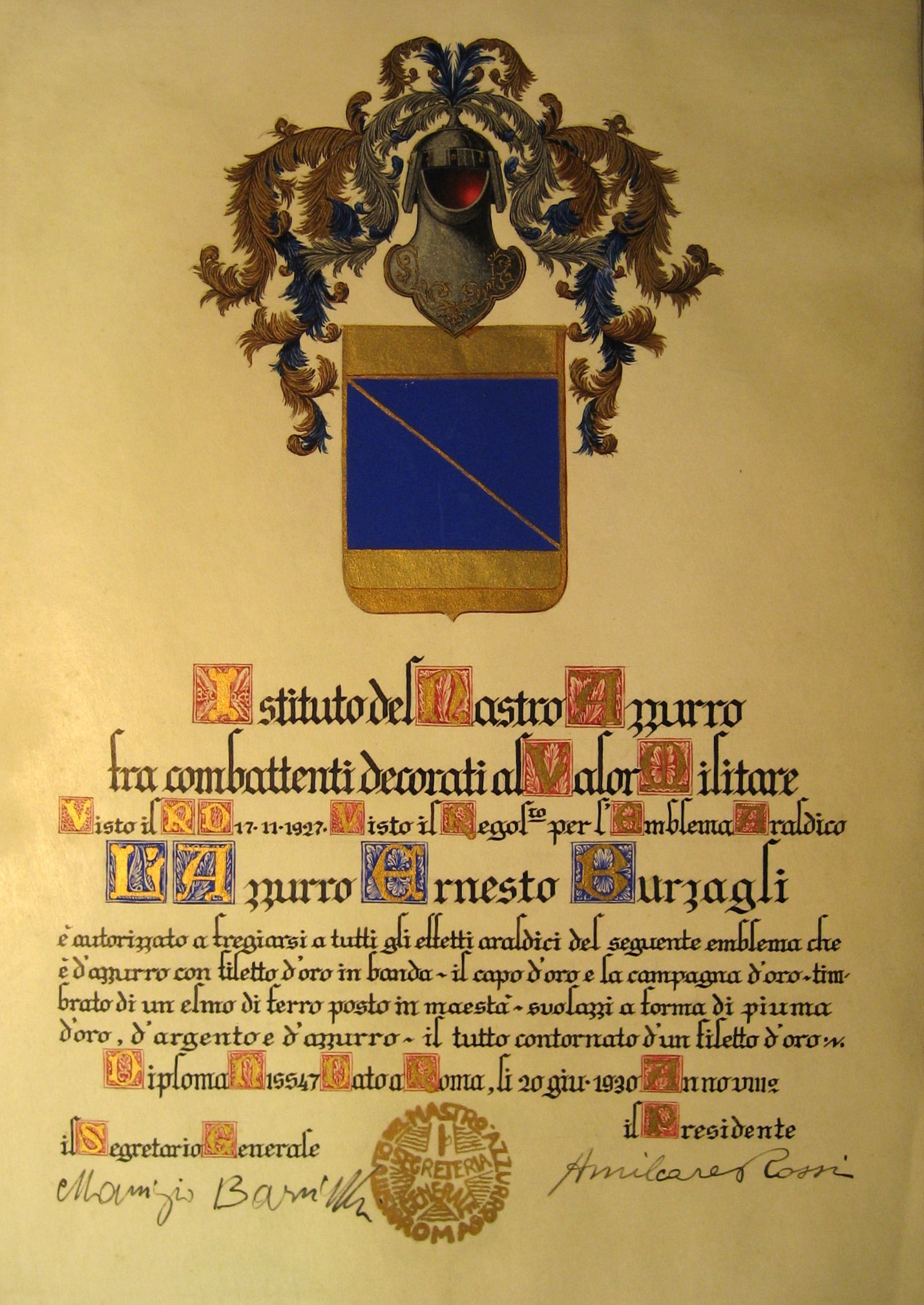
Coat of arms, granted by the Istituto Nazionale del Nastro Azzurro to Ernesto Burzagli.

Burzagli was from a noble family of Montevarchi, but was born in Modena, as his father had relocated there to assume a position as a professor of physics at the Military Academy of Modena. Burzagli graduated from the Accademia Navale di Livorno in 1892, and after serving on a number of ships in the Royal Italian Navy, he was assigned as a military attaché to Tokyo, Japan in May 1904. He arrived just in time to become an official foreign observer of the Imperial Japanese Navy in the Russo-Japanese War, and witnessed first-hand the naval bombardment of Port Arthur. After the end of the war, in April 1906, he was received by Emperor Meiji of Japan, and received the Order of the Rising Sun before his return to Italy.

== Naval career ==
In 1912, Burzagli was assigned command of an Intrepid-class destroyer. Promoted to commander in 1914, he saw combat in World War I as commander of a squadron of destroyers, and from May 1916 to March 1917, served on the General Staff of the Italian Navy. In 1917, Captain Burzagli sailed the RN Libia across the Atlantic Ocean to New York City. Near the end of the conflict, he was promoted to higher rank.

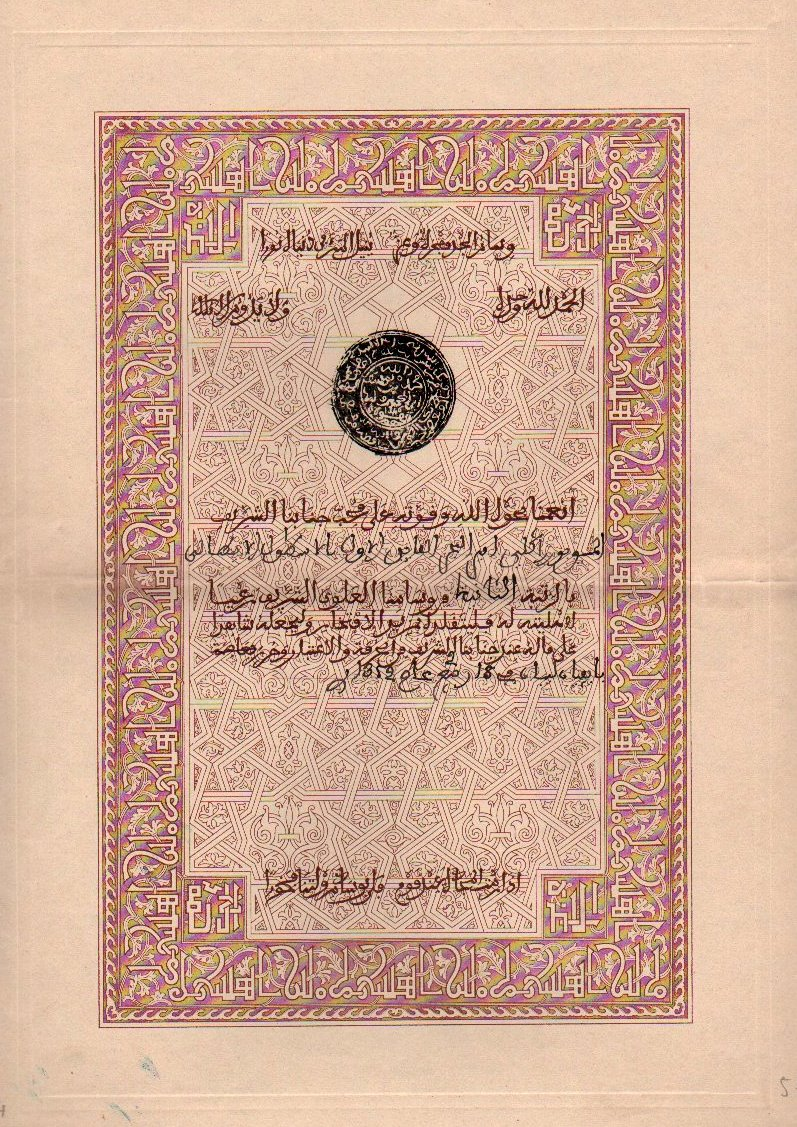
Moroccan decree (dahir) which proclaims and confirms that the Order of Oissam Alaouite is conferred on Ernesto Burzagli

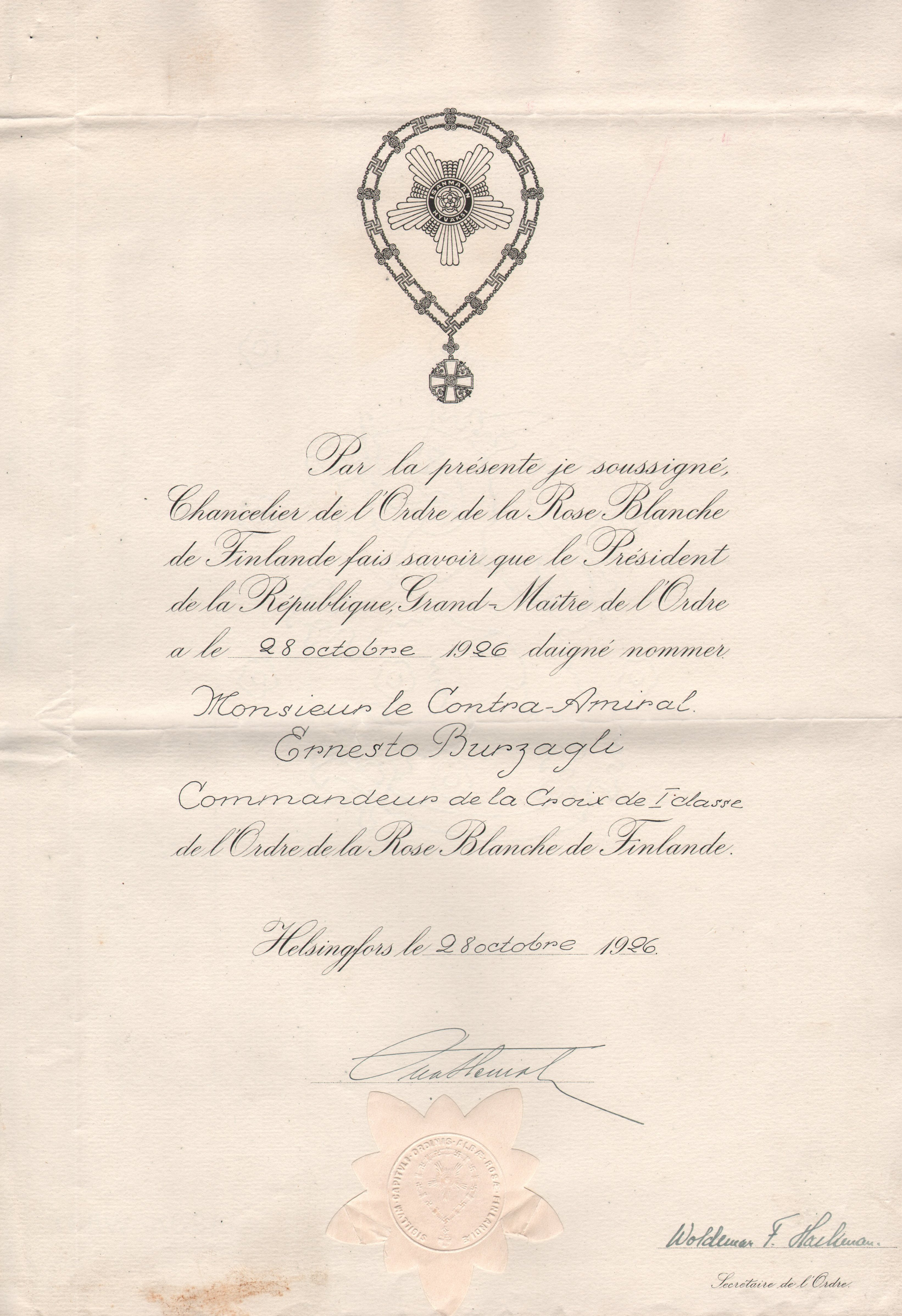
Diploma of the Order of the White Rose of Finland, creating Burzagli a Commander (First Class)

In February 1918, he was awarded the Military Order of Savoy. In 1919 he was decorated with the Navy Cross by the United States Navy for his service to the Allied cause during the World War.

At the end of the war in 1919, Burzagli was sent to Albania to command the Vlore naval base, and played an active role in the suppression of pro-independence Albanian uprising, personally undertaking several reconnaissance flights over rebel-held territory, for which he was awarded the Bronze Medal of Military Valor.

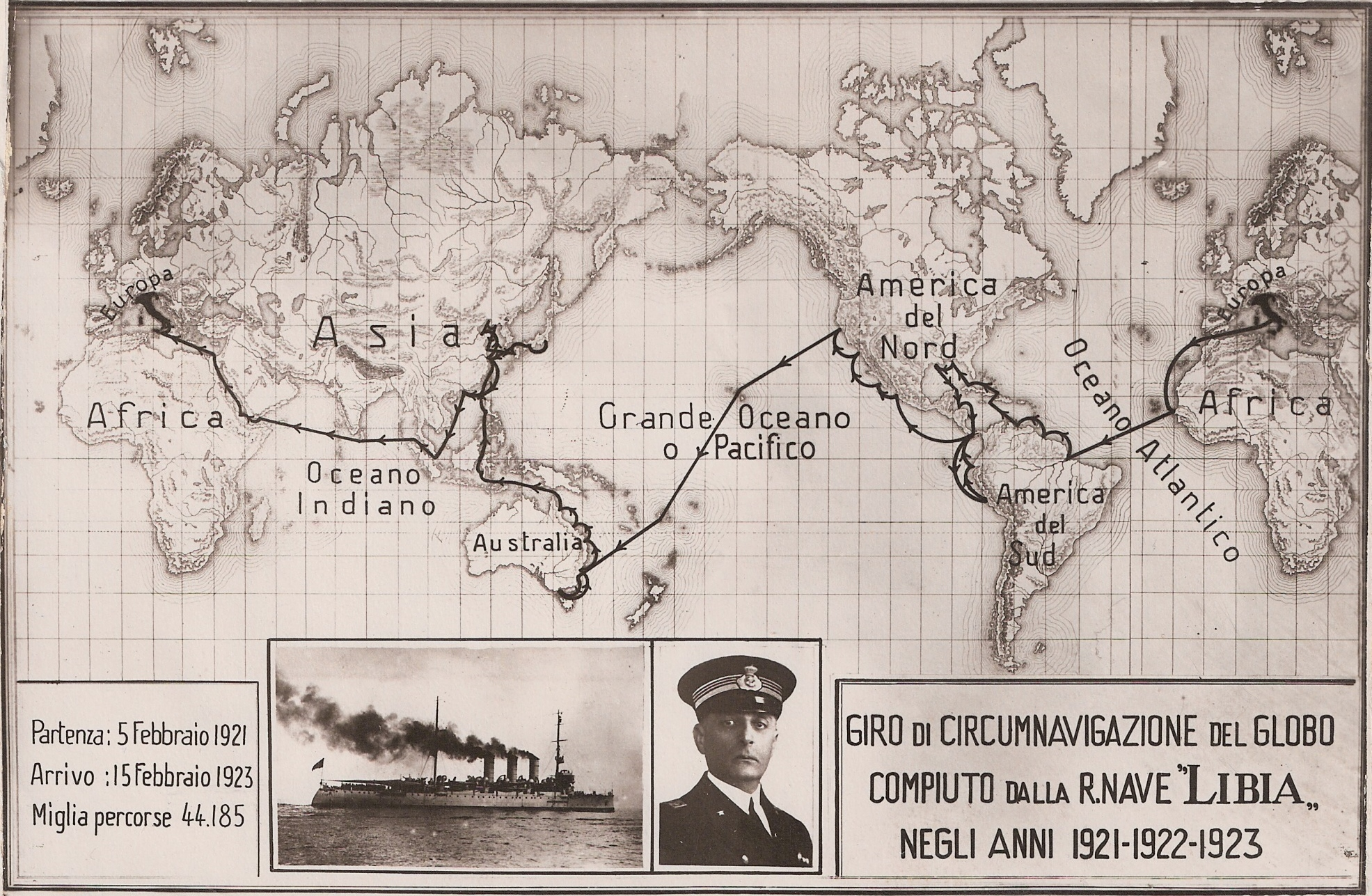
Map showing the route sailed by the RN Libia circumnavigating the world (1921-1923); and inset images feature a side view of the naval vessel and the ship's captain.

Burzagli was given command of the cruiser RN Libia from February 1921 to February 1923, and during this period, the ship circumnavigated the globe. On his return, Burzagli was promoted to the rank of rear admiral; and he and assigned to head the Accademia Navale and the Italian Institute of Marine War.

He wrote a treatise in four volumes, Manual of Navigation (1927).

He left his place at the academy in 1927 to accept the position of Chief of Staff of the Navy, a post he held until 1931.

Burzagli was a Technical Advisor in the Italian delegation at the London Naval Conference 1930 for the reduction of the armaments.

Burzagli was promoted to Divisional Admiral in 1926, and promoted again to Vice Admiral in 1928. He was Naval Chief of Staff from 1927 to 1931. He was no longer Naval Chief of Staff in 1932 when Italy announced plans to retire two battleships, twelve cruisers, 25 destroyers, and 12 submarines—in all, 130,000 tons of naval vessels.

In 1933, he was also named a Senator. In the Senate, he served as a member of the Commission for Examination of Law Conversion (1936–1939), a member of the Commission for Finances (1939–1943), and a member of the Commission for the High Court of Justice (1940–1943).

== Later years ==
Burzagli withdrew from the active service in 1936. After the withdrawal to Montevarchi near his estate of Moncioni, he entered into friction with Benito Mussolini for his clear opposition to Italy's entrance into the Axis powers, and for his subsequent opposition to Italy's entrance into World War II.

In the spring of 1944, he refused to collaborate with the authorities of the Italian Social Republic and was arrested. He was released in consideration of his reputation and his advanced age.

He died on 13 September 1944 and was buried in a monumental tomb in the cemetery of Montevarchi.

== Honours ==
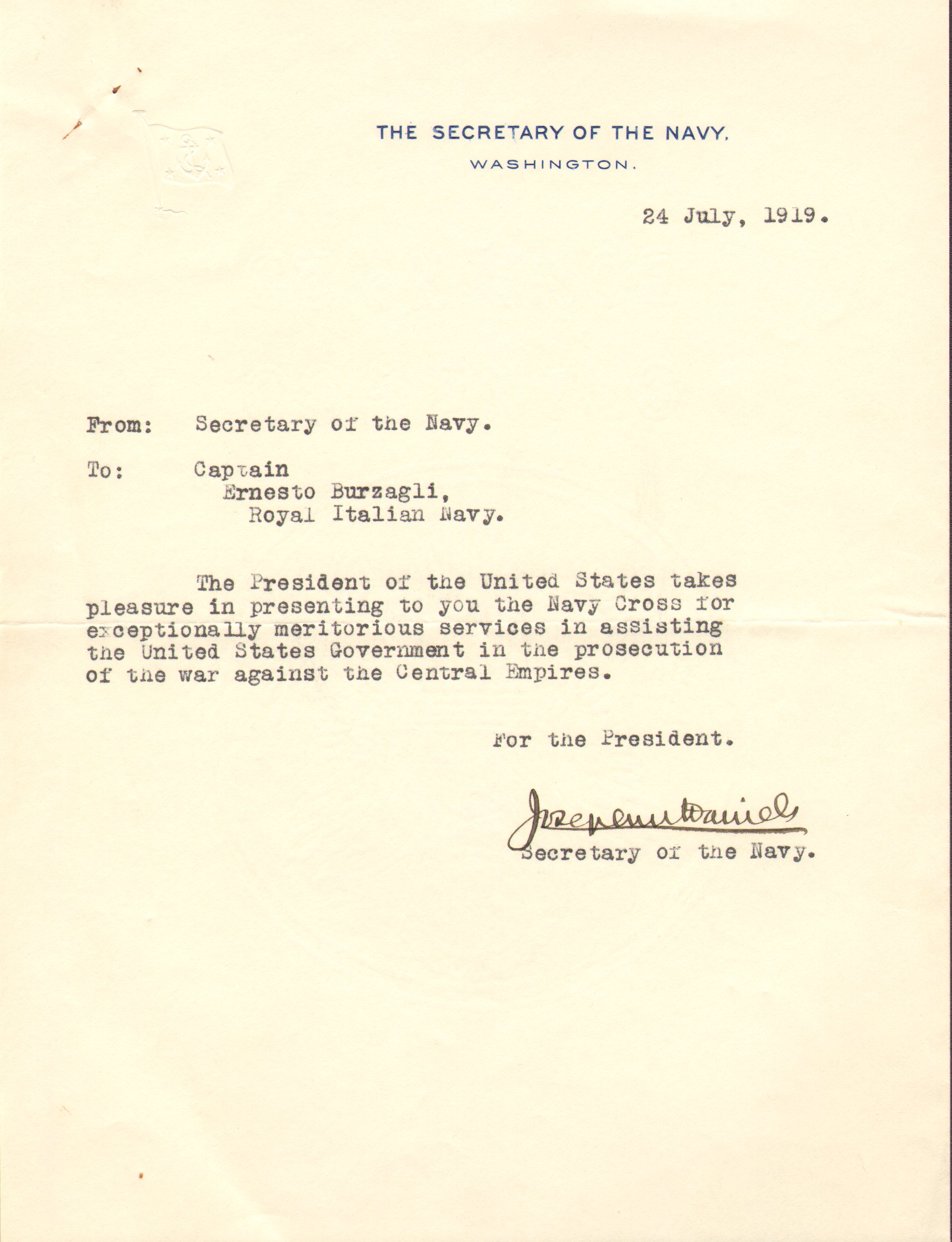
Letter dated 1919, from the United States Secretary of the Navy, awarding the Navy Cross to Burzagli

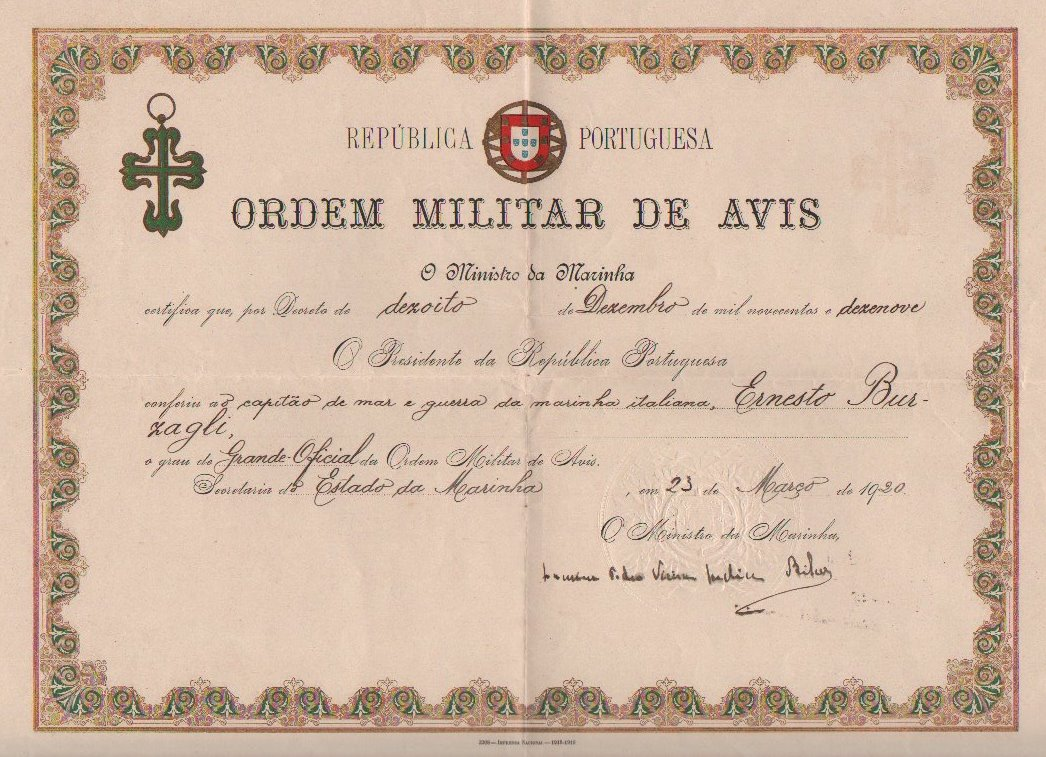
Certificate confirming that the Order of Aviz was conferred on Burzagli by the President of the Portuguese Republic in 1920

Burzagli received many awards and decorations, including awards from several other countries, such as the Navy Cross from the United States, the second-highest award that the nation's military has.

- • Knight of the Order of the Crown of Italy, Kingdom of Italy, 1905.
- • Officer of the Grand Cross of the Order of the Crown of Italy, 1916.
- • Commander of the Grand Cross of the Order of the Crown of Italy, 1919.
- • Grand Officer of the Grand Cross of the Order of the Crown of Italy, 1926.
- • Knight of the Grand Cross of the Order of the Crown of Italy, 1933.
- • Knight of the Order of Saints Maurice and Lazarus, Kingdom of Italy, 1915.
- • Officer of the Order of Saints Maurice and Lazarus, 1922.
- • Commander of the Order of Saints Maurice and Lazarus, 1923.
- • Grand Officer of the Order of Saints Maurice and Lazarus, 1931.
- • Grand Cross of the Order of Saints Maurice and Lazarus, 1936.
- • Order of the Rising Sun, 5th Class, Japan, 1906.
- • Order of the Sacred Treasure, 5th Class, Japan, 1906.
- • Companion of the Order of the Bath, United Kingdom
- • Knight of the Légion d'honneur, France.
- • Knight of the Order of Saint Anna, Russia
- • Knight of the Military Order of Savoy, Kingdom of Italy, 1918.
- • Commander, First Class, of the Order of the White Rose, Finland.
- • Commander of the Order of the Sun, Peru.
- • Commander of the Order of the Star of Romania, Romania
- • Grand Officer of the Order of the Star of Romania, Romania
- • Grand Officer of the Order of Ouissam Alaouite, Morocco.
- • Grand Officer of the Order of Orange-Nassau with the Swords Netherlands, 7 August, 1926
- • Grand Officer of the Military Order of Aviz, Portugal, 1920.
- • Grand Cross of the Order of Naval Merit, Spain

=== Decorations ===
- • Bronze Medal of Military Valor, 1912.
- • Navy Cross, United States, 1919
- • Croce d'argento per anzianità di servizio.
- • Croce d'oro per anzianità di servizio.

=== Service medals ===
- • Medaglia commemorativa delle campagne d'Africa, Italo-Abyssinian War, 1895.
- • Russo-Japanese War Medal, Japan, 1904-1905.
- • Medaglia commemorativa delle guerra italo-turca, Italo-Turkish War, 1911-1912.
- • Medaglia commemorativa della guerra 1915-1918, 1919.
- • it:Medaglia commemorativa della guerra italo-austriaca 1915-1918.
- • Medaglia commemorativa dell'Unità d'Italia.
- • Medaglia interalleata della Vittoria, Kingdom of Italy, 1920.
- • Medal of the Centenary of the Independence of Peru, 1821-1921
- • Medaglia d'onore per lunga navigazione.
- • Medaglia Mauriziana al merito di dieci lustri di carriera militare, Kingdom of Italy

== Selected works ==
- Burzagli, Ernesto. (1927). Manuale dell'Ufficiale di Rotta. Genoa:
- __________ and A Grillo. (1932). Manual del oficial de derrota (Navigation Manual translated from Italian to Spanish). Barcelona: G. Gilli

== See also ==
- Regia Marina
- Enrico Caviglia, military attaché in Tokyo (1904–1905)
