= Outlook on Renewable Energy in America =

2007 report on US renewable energy

Outlook on Renewable Energy in America is a comprehensive two-volume report, published in 2007 by the American Council on Renewable Energy (ACORE), about the future of renewable energy in the United States. It has been said that this report exposes a "new reality for renewable energy in America".

Volume One of the report presents background information on government research conducted by the National Renewable Energy Laboratory, Energy Information Administration, Electric Power Research Institute and other institutions. It also collates information from industry associations such as the American Wind Energy Association, Solar Energy Industries Association, National Hydropower Association, as well as some non-profit organizations.

Joint Outlook on Renewable Energy in America is the second volume of the report which presents a scenario compiled by the American renewable energy community. ACORE makes it clear that this report is not a forecast—it is a scenario of what is achievable if the country wants renewables to reach their full potential, and is willing to embrace the public policies to make that happen.

ACORE released an update of the report in March 2014, which assesses the marketplace and forecasts the future of each renewable energy technology sector from the perspectives of U.S. renewable energy trade associations. Each sector forecast is accompanied by a list of the trade association's specific policy recommendations that they believe might encourage continued industry growth.

== Scenario ==
According to experts, renewable energy could provide up to 635 gigawatts (GW) of new electricity generating capacity by 2025 – a substantial contribution and potentially more than the nation's need for new capacity. According to this scenario, this capacity could come from a wide array of new technologies utilizing the full range of our renewable resources:

- Wind power could provide 248 GW by 2025
- Solar energy and power could provide 164 GW
- Geothermal energy and power 100 GW
- Biomass energy, power, and fuels 100 GW
- Water power 23 GW

In addition, the scenario shows that renewable fuels could meet a large portion of U.S. liquid fuel needs. Recent studies show that biofuels could supply 30% to 40% of U.S. petroleum products by 2030. Ethanol fuel alone could reach 11.5 billion US gallons (44,000,000 m^{3}) per year by the end of the first quarter of 2009, a significant contribution to the approximately 135 billion US gallons (510,000,000 m^{3}) of gasoline consumed annually.

== Public policy principles ==
To make the transition to the renewable energy future that is outlined in the scenario, the report argues that the energy policy of the United States needs to be built on a range of principles, which include:

- Building a comprehensive national renewable energy strategy that addresses the full range of technological and market issues.
- Creating energy policies that address both the challenges of oil dependence and global warming in an integrated way.
- Recognizing that energy efficiency and renewable energy work together.
- Providing long-term incentives for renewable power investments, modernizing our transmission and distribution systems, and investing in the next generation of biofuel facilities infrastructure.
- Scaling up an accelerated national R&D program to return the U.S. to global leadership.
- Implementing long-term and stable policy commitments that allow industry, the financial sector, and consumers to make longer-term decisions.

== Rationale for renewables ==
The report argues that America needs renewable energy, for many reasons:

America needs energy that is secure, reliable, improves public health, protects the environment, addresses climate change, creates jobs, and provides technological leadership. America needs renewable energy. If renewable energy is to be developed to its full potential, America will need coordinated, sustained federal and state policies that expand renewable energy markets; promote and deploy new technology; and provide appropriate opportunities to encourage renewable energy use in all critical energy market sectors: wholesale and distributed electricity generation, thermal energy applications, and transportation.

The report quotes President Bush on the need to diversify America's energy supply:

It’s in our vital interest to diversify America’s energy supply – the way forward is through technology. We must continue changing the way America generates electric power, by even greater use of … solar and wind energy. We must continue investing in new methods of producing ethanol, using everything from wood chips to grasses, to agricultural wastes.

— President George W. Bush, State of the Union, 1-23-2007.

ACORE suggests that these reports dispel the commonly held notion that renewable energy cannot supply the energy needs of a growing American economy. But for this to happen, the government would have to commit to long term policies that promote renewable energy.

== See also ==
- Energy use in the United States
- Renewable energy commercialization in the United States
- Solar power in the United States
- Wind power in the United States
