= Honorary society =

Honorary society may refer to:

- honor society
- professional association
- learned society

== See also ==
- Honorary (disambiguation)
