= Solar Electricity Handbook =

Book by Michael Boxwell

- 2012 edition cover
- Author: Michael Boxwell
- Language: English
- Publisher: Greenstream Publishing (current)
- Publication date: 2012
- Media type: Print (Paperback) and Kindle
- Pages: 187
- ISBN: 978-1-907670-04-6

The Solar Electricity Handbook is a yearbook written by eco-technology author Michael Boxwell. It is a beginners technical manual for people looking to learn about solar energy and how to generate electricity from photovoltaic panels.

The book starts with explaining how solar energy works and then guides the reader through evaluating a solar project, how to design a photovoltaic system and how to install and maintain it. The book uses the principal example of a small off-grid home, but incorporates a number of other examples throughout the book.

The book is not aimed at people who are already working in the photovoltaic industry.

Updated every year, the book's seventh revision was published in 2013.
