= Military Medal of Honor =

Japanese medals

Military Medal of Honor (従軍記章, jūgun kishō) was a military decoration for meritorious service to the Empire of Japan, formerly awarded to all military personnel who participated in battles in a war. These war medals and accompanying certificates specifically identify the conflict for which the decoration will have been awarded.

These decorations were effectively abolished during the Allied Occupation of Japan in the post-war years (1945–1951).

== Japanese War Medals ==
=== 1874 Formosa Expedition War Medal ===
1874 Formosa Expedition Medal ribbon bar

The Japanese expedition of 1874 to Taiwan Province, also referred to as the Taiwan Expedition of 1874, was in response to the Mudan Incident of 1871. Fifty-four shipwrecked Ryukyuan sailors were killed by Paiwan aborigines in December 1871 in southern Taiwan. In seeking restitution from Qing China, Japan reached an impasse when the Chinese claimed that they were not responsible for the actions of the aborigines in territory that was nominally under Chinese sovereignty.

The Japanese government sent an expedition of 3,600 soldiers led by Saigō Tsugumichi in May 1874. The Japanese won a decisive victory at the Battle of Stone Gate on 22 May 1874. Thirty aborigines were either killed or mortally wounded in the battle, and a great number wounded. Japanese casualties were six killed and thirty wounded.

In November 1874 the Japanese forces withdrew from Taiwan after the Qing government agreed to an indemnity of 500,000 Kuping taels.

1874 Formosa Expedition War Medal

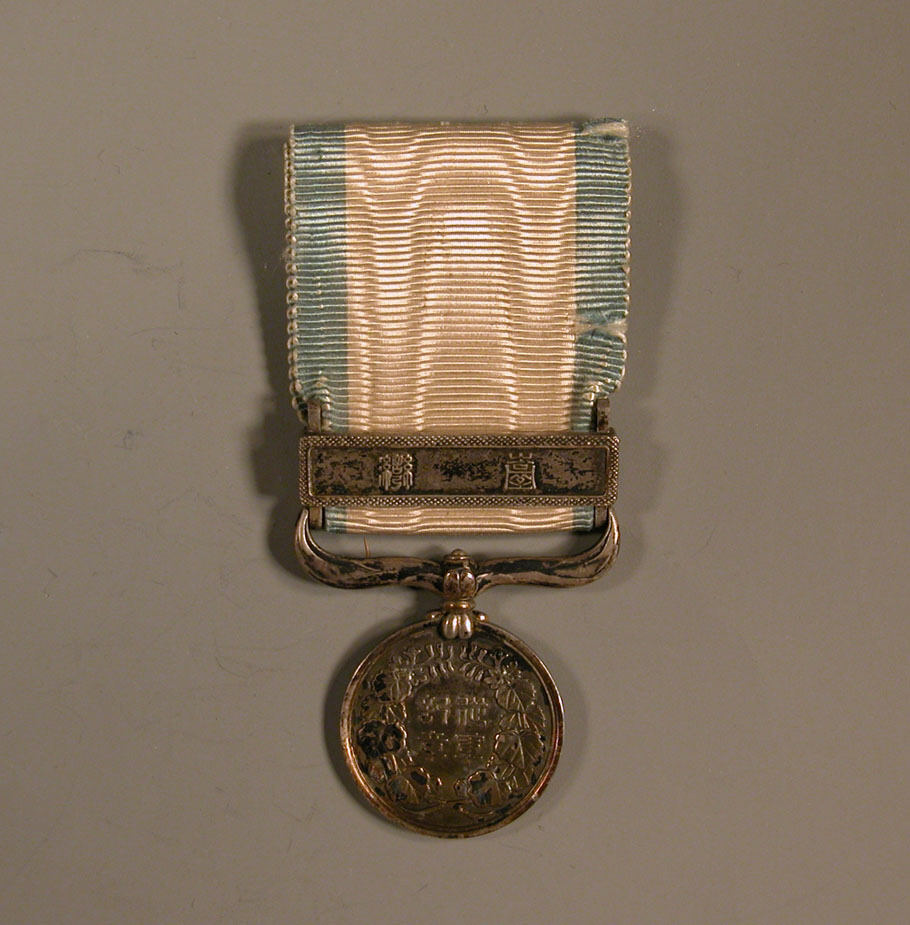
Front

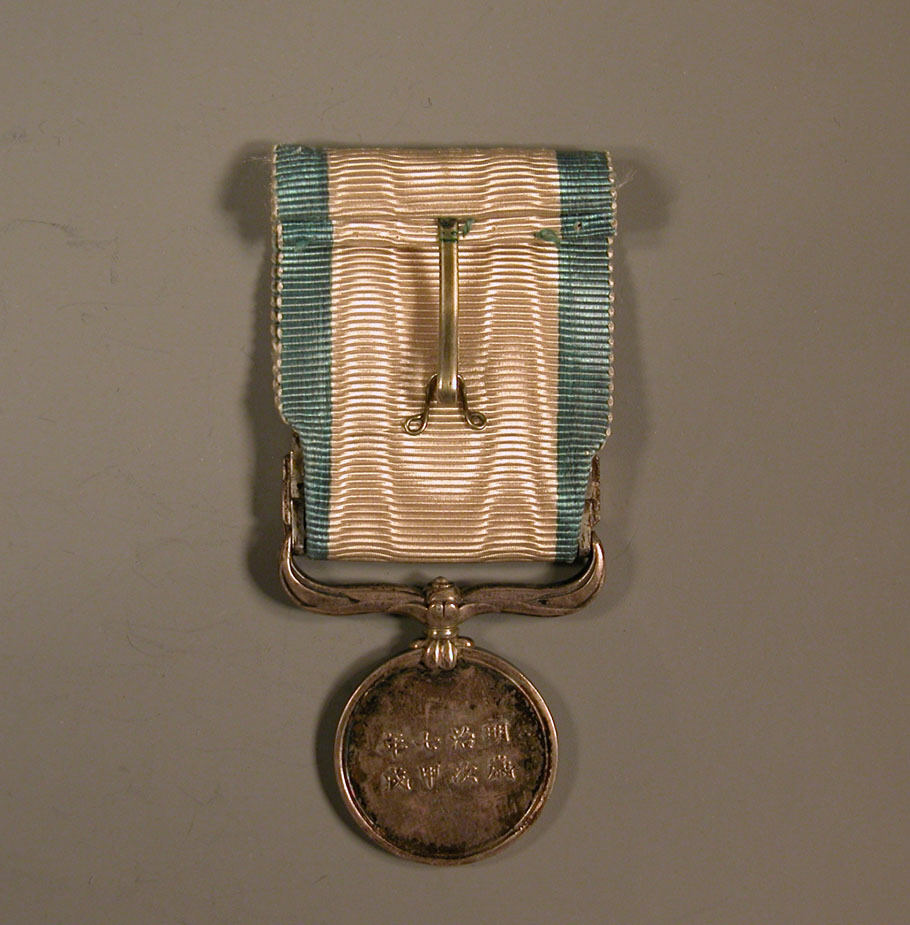
Back

=== 1894–95 Sino-Japanese War Medal ===
1894–95 Sino-Japanese War Medal ribbon bar

The First Sino–Japanese War, which lasted from 1 August 1894 to 17 April 1895, was fought between Qing Dynasty China and Meiji Japan, primarily over control of Korea. After more than six months of continuous successes by the Japanese army and naval forces, as well as the loss of the Chinese port of Weihai, the Qing leadership sued for peace in February 1895.

1894–95 Sino-Japanese War Medal

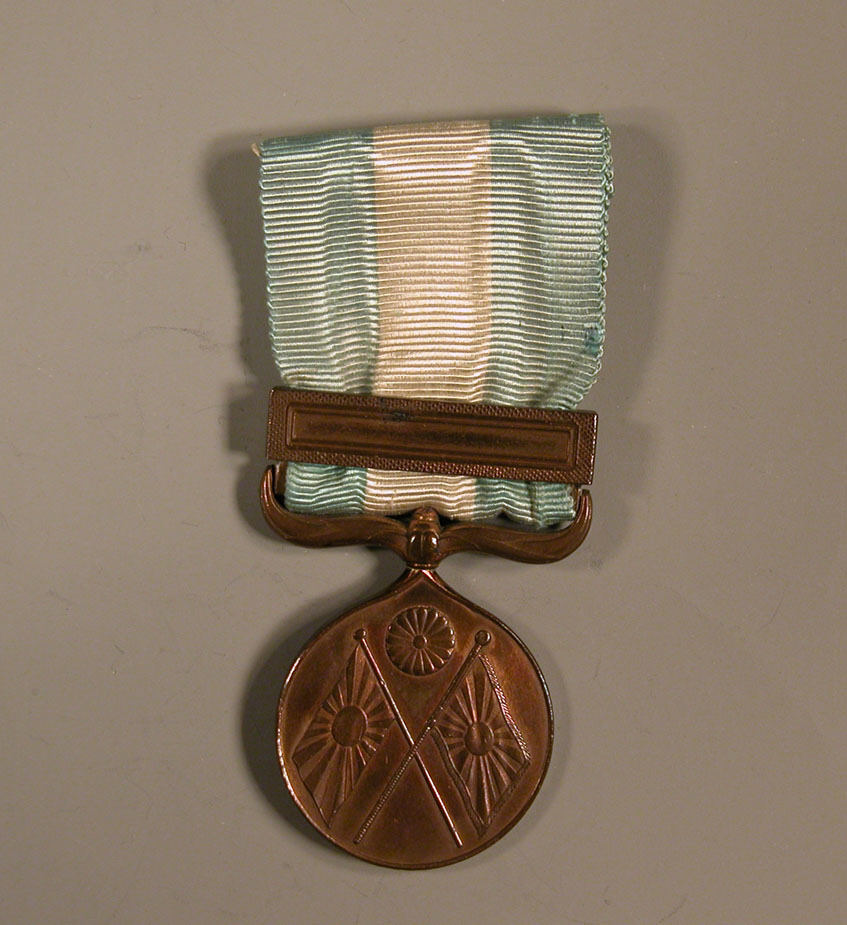
Front

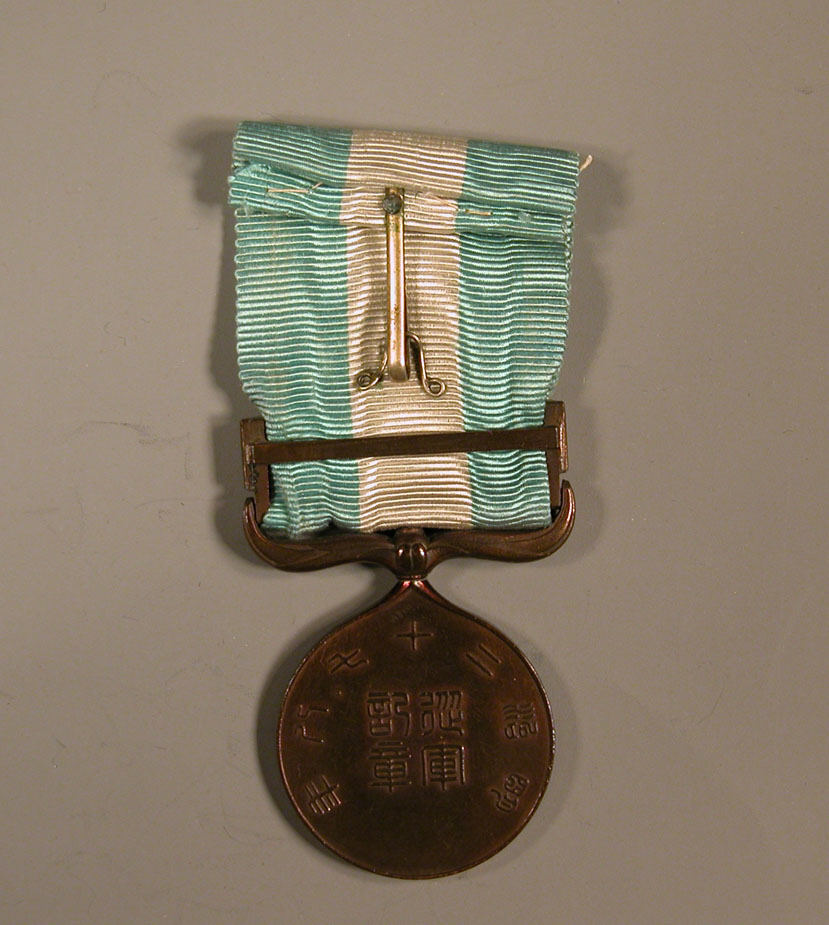
Back

=== 1900 Boxer War Medal ===
1900 Boxer War Medal ribbon bar

Imperial Edict No. 142 was issued on April 21, 1901 ordering a commemorative medal for those who had participated in the relief of the Beijing legations during the Boxer Rebellion.

1900 Boxer War Medal

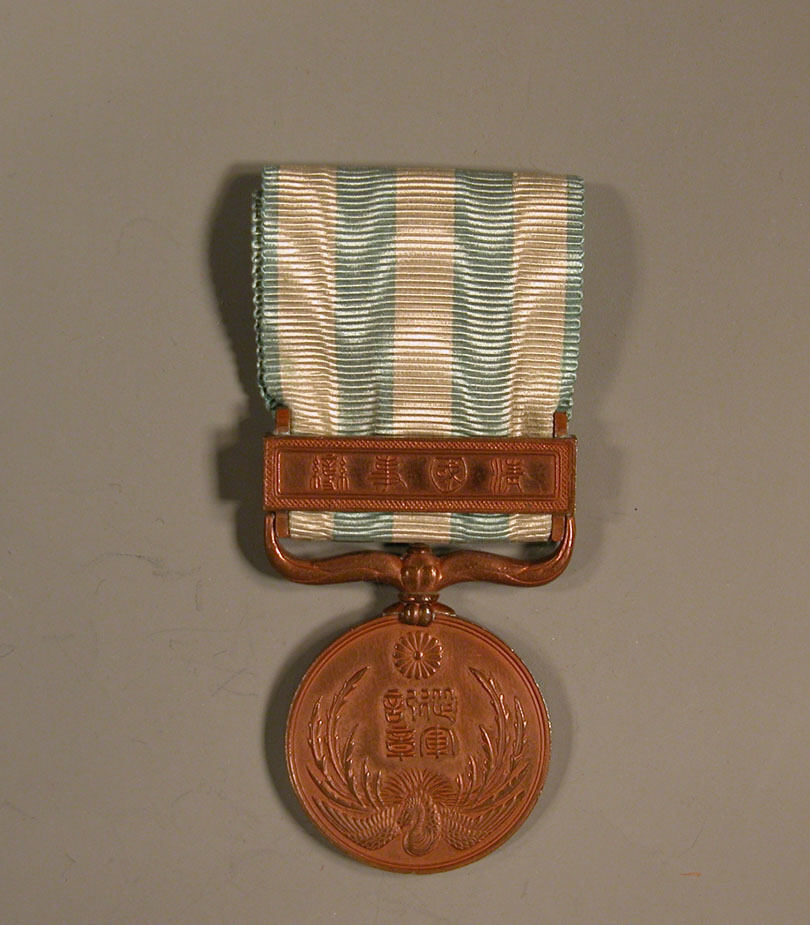
Front

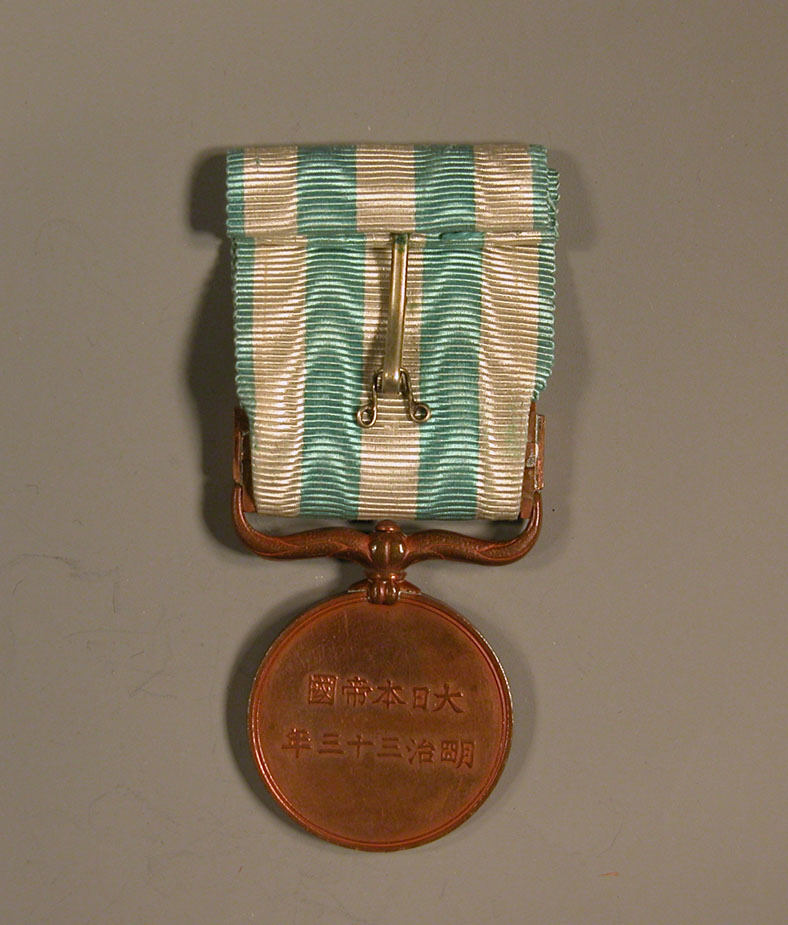
Back

=== 1904–05 Russo-Japanese War Medal ===
1904–05 Russo-Japanese War Medal ribbon bar

A unique jūgun kishō was ordered on March 31, 1906 by Imperial Edict No. 51 in recognition of those who served in the war which occurred during the 37th and 38th years of the Meiji period -- Meiji 37-38 (1904–1905). This is more commonly known as the Russo-Japanese War.

A rough translation of the body of the document explains:

"A medal of honor (jūgun kishō) is hereby given, on March 30, 1906, to Ernesto Burzagli, Lieutenant of the Italian Navy, on application by the Naval Minister of Japan and with the Emperor's approval, pursuant to the Regulation Relating to the Medals Honoring Participation in Battles (1904-05). Dated April 1, 1906."

"After review of this certificate, [the presentation to Lt. Bruzagli of the Medal] has been recorded on the Roll of Medals of Honor."

An image of the front of the medal itself is shown at the bottom center of the certificate—crossed Army and Navy flags on either side of the Imperial Crysanthemum crest above and the Imperial Paulownia crest below.

Although it is not clear from the certificate whether Lt. Bruzagli did in fact participate in the battles or the award was honorary, we know from photographic sources that he was aboard one of the ships which contributing to the naval bombardment and blockade of Port Arthur in 1904. He was with the Japanese naval forces which aided in the capture of that strategic objective. Photographic records also place Burzagli with the entourage of the Japanese Minister of the Navy visiting the captured city of Dalny, just north of Port Arthur in January 1905, and with the occupying Japanese forces in January 1905.

1904–05 Russo-Japanese War Medal

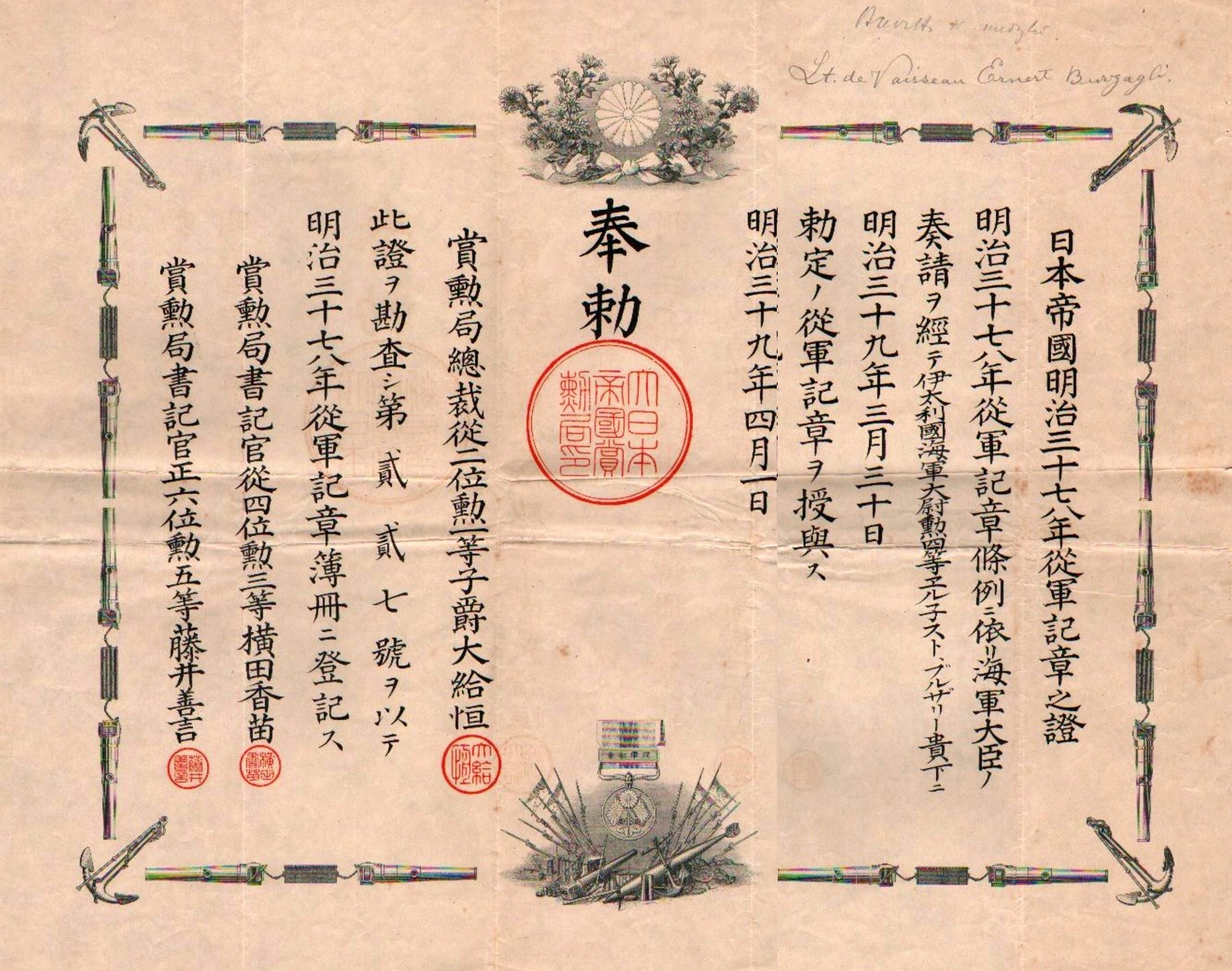
jūgun kishō certificate given to Lieutenant Ernesto Burzagli, Italian Naval Attaché, in recognition of his participation in fleet operations during the Russo-Japanese War.

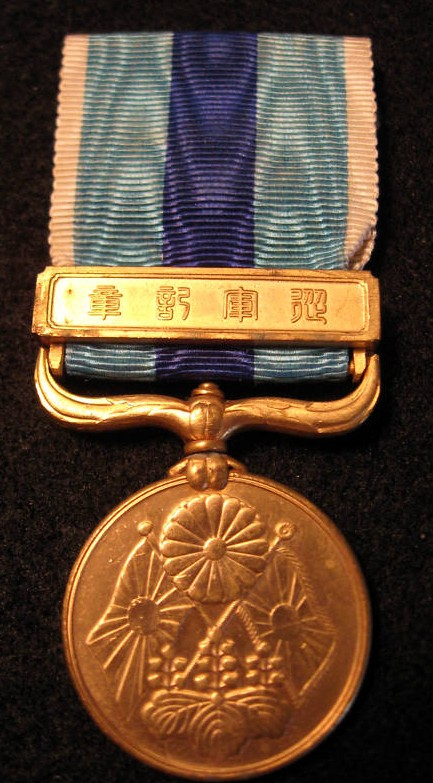
Front

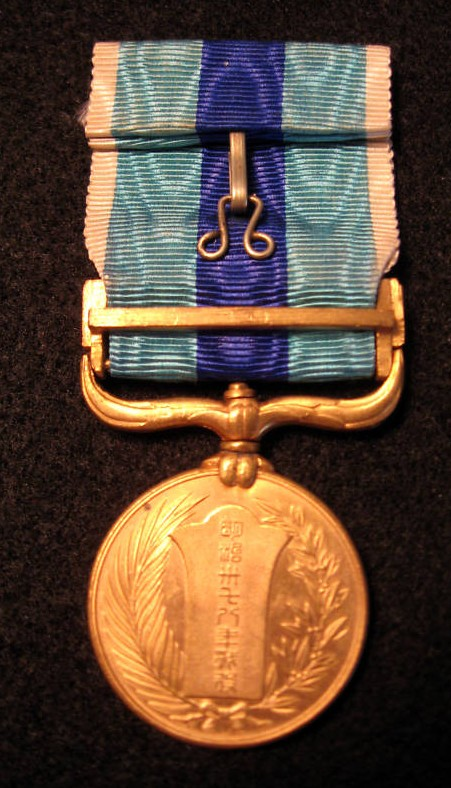
Back

=== 1914–1920 First World War Medal ===
Ribbon bar of the 1914–1920 First World War Medal

Japanese participation in World War I was commemorated by medals created on November 6, 1915 by Imperial Edict No. 203. Two very similar medals were issued, one for service in 1914-15 and the other for the period 1914-20. If a person earned both they could only wear the latter.

1914–20 First World War Medal

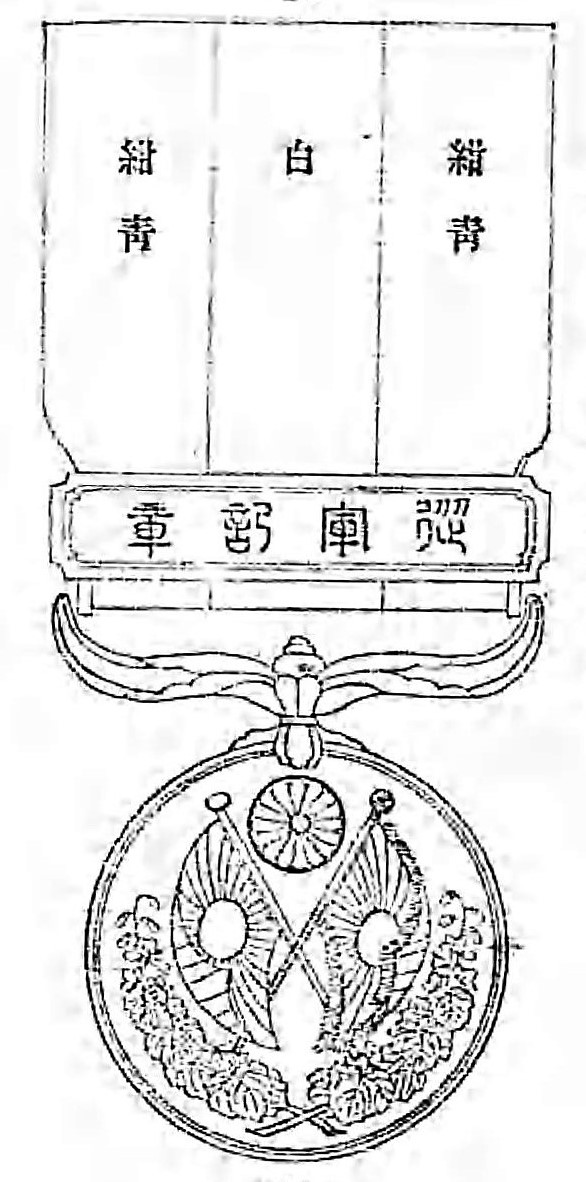
Front

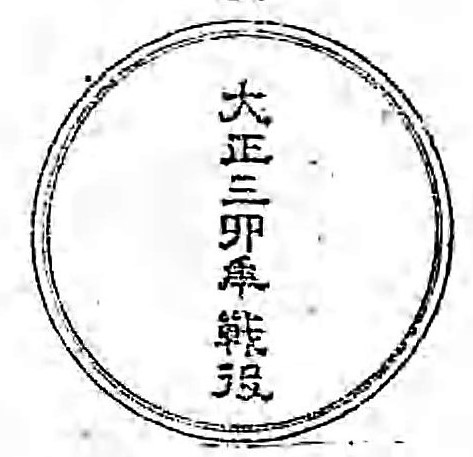
Back (first version)

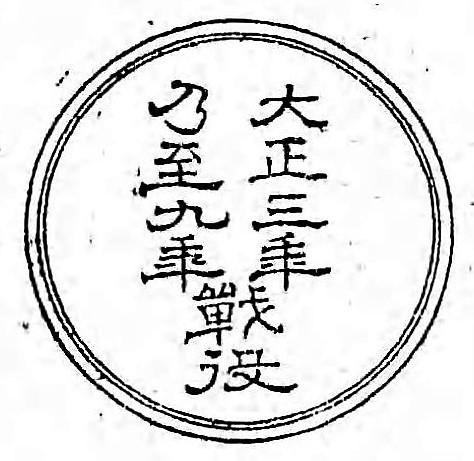
Back (second version)

=== Allied First World War Victory Medal ===
Allied victory medal ribbon bar.

Established by Imperial Edict #406 on 17 September 1920, it was one of the series of Inter-allied Victory Medals created and awarded by the victorious allies after World War I. Thirteen nations in all issued a version of the medal.

Allied First World War Victory Medal

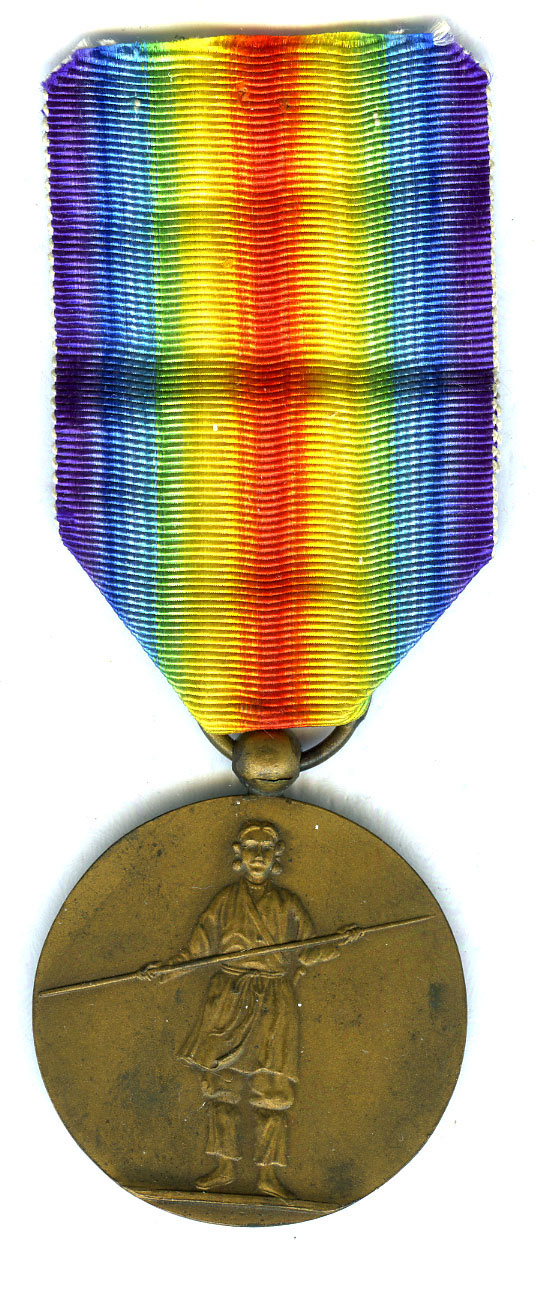
Front

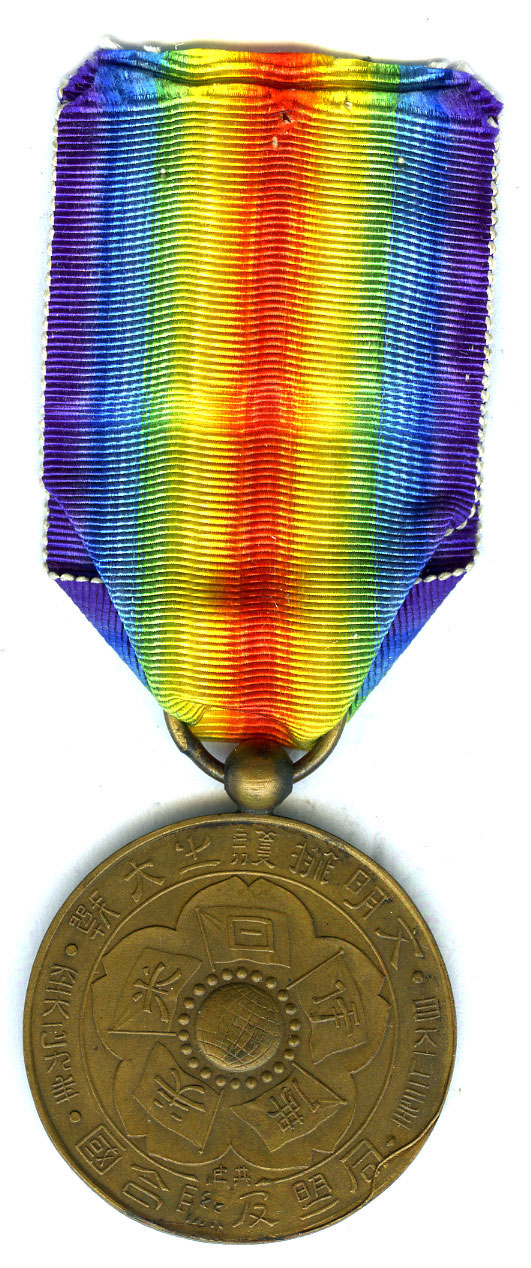
Back

=== 1931–1934 China Incident War Medal ===
Ribbon bar of the 1931–1934 China Incident War Medal

1931–1934 China Incident War Medal

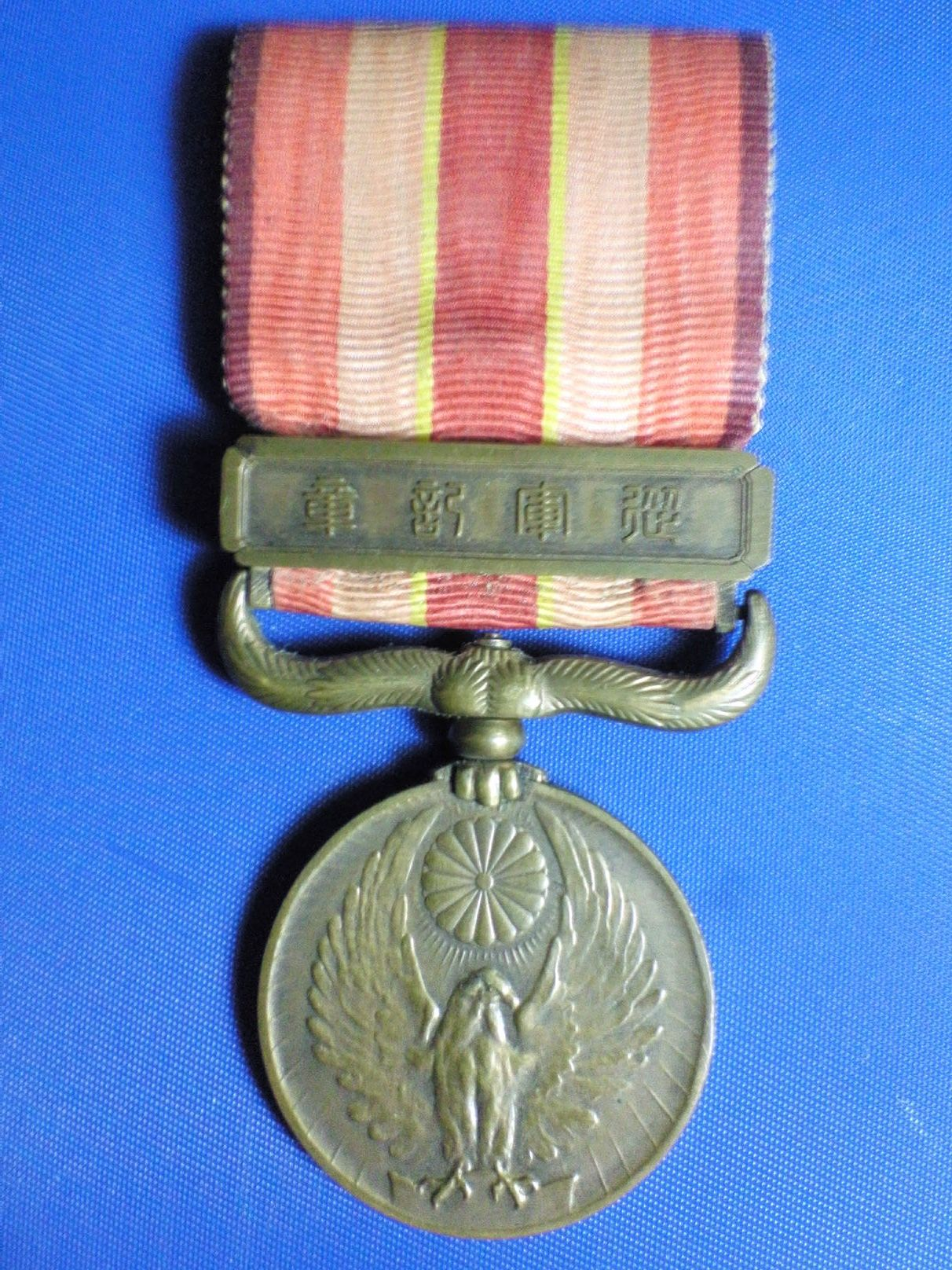
Front

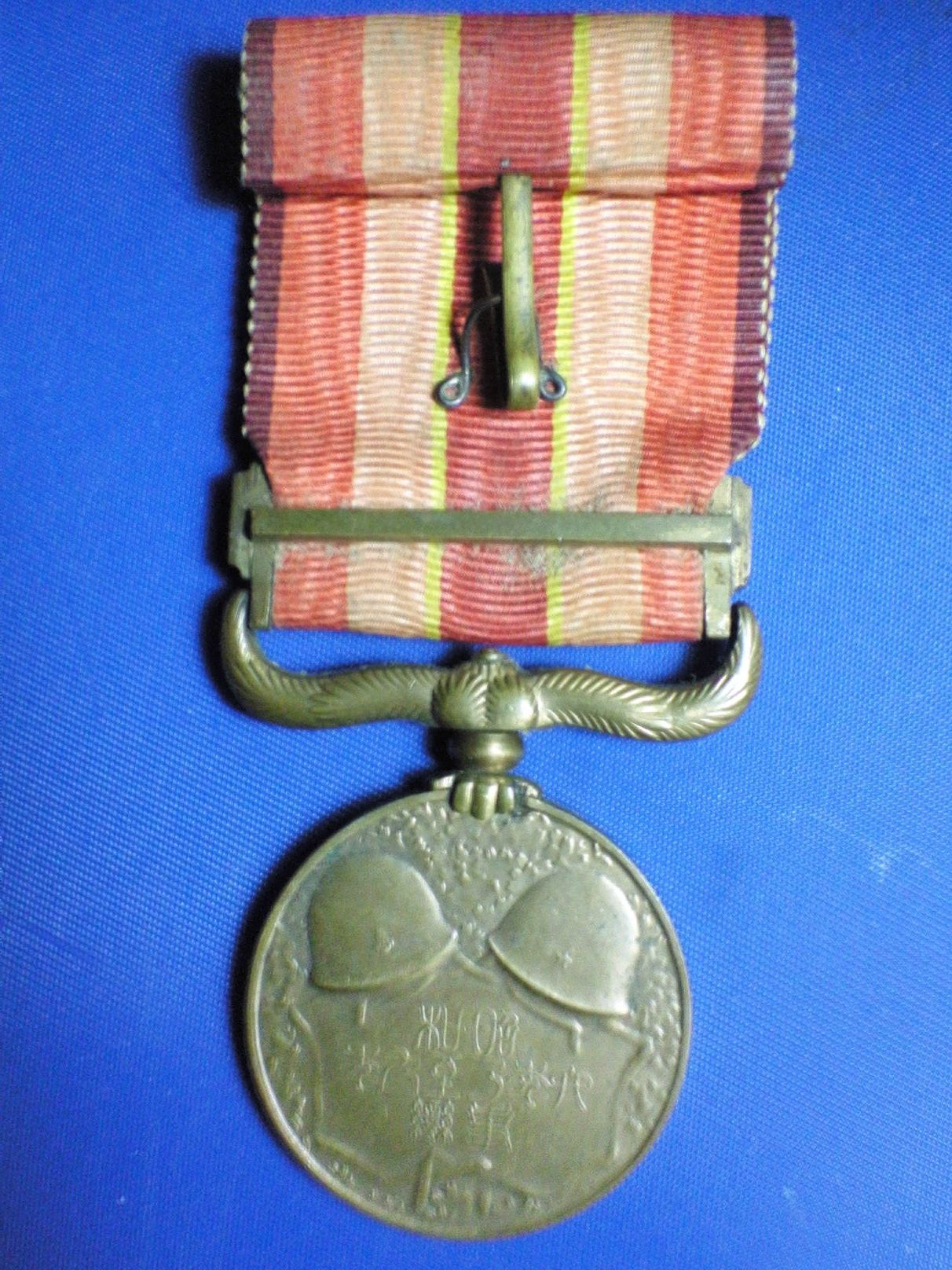
Back

=== 1937–1945 China Incident War Medal ===
Ribbon bar of the 1937–1945 China Incident War Medal

The China Incident Medal (支那事変従軍記章, Sina jihen jūgun kishō) medal was created by Imperial Edit No. 496 on July 27, 1939; and was awarded for service in China at any time from the 12th through the 20th years of the Shōwa period -- Shōwa 12-20 (1937–1945). An amendment was promulgated by Imperial Edict No. 418 in 1944; and the decoration was abolished in 1946 by government ordinance No. 177.

Although the Japanese government still uses "China Incident" in formal documents, albeit with the word Shina (支那) replaced in the present by Chūgoku (中国), media in Japan often paraphrase it with other expressions like Japan-China Incident (日華事変, Nikka jihen) or (日支事変, Nisshi jihen) or (日中事変, Hinaka jihen). The word Shina is now construed by China as a derogatory term.

1937–1945 China Incident War Medal

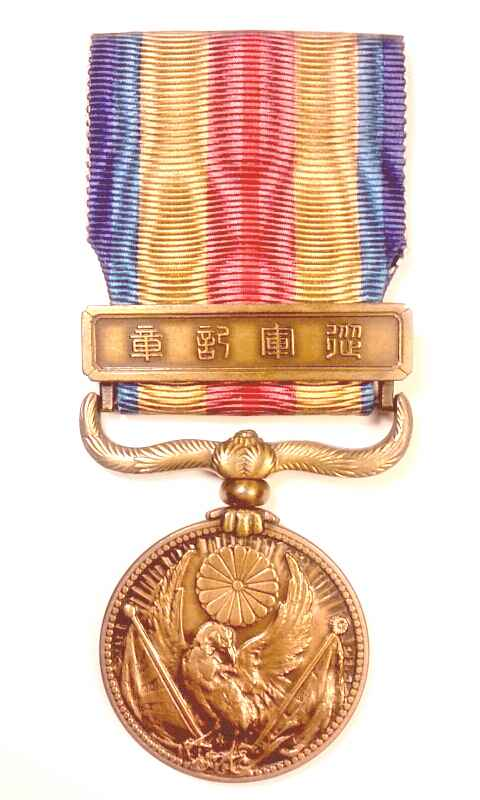
Front

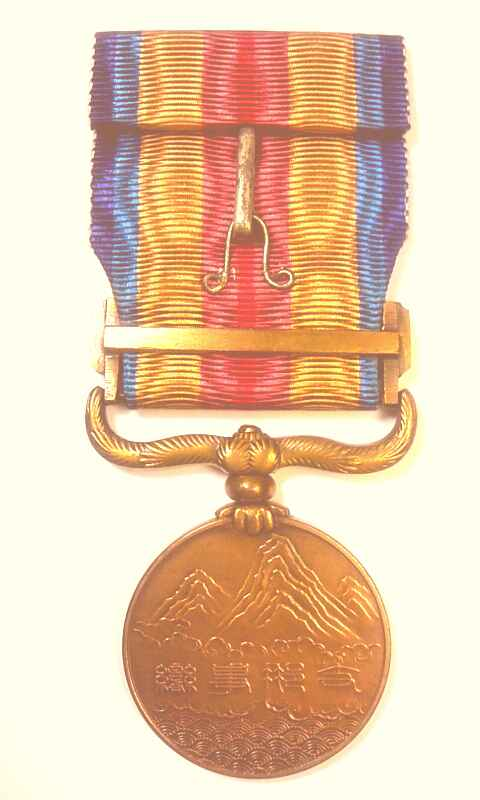
Back

=== 1941–1945 Great East Asia War Medal ===
Great East Asia War Medal ribbon bar

The Great East Asia War Medal (大東亜戦争従軍記章, Daitōa sensō jūgun kishō) was created on June 21, 1944 by Imperial Edict No. 417. Because of the late date in the war it appears none were actually awarded to veterans. However many later replicas exist.

1941–1945 Great East Asia War Medal

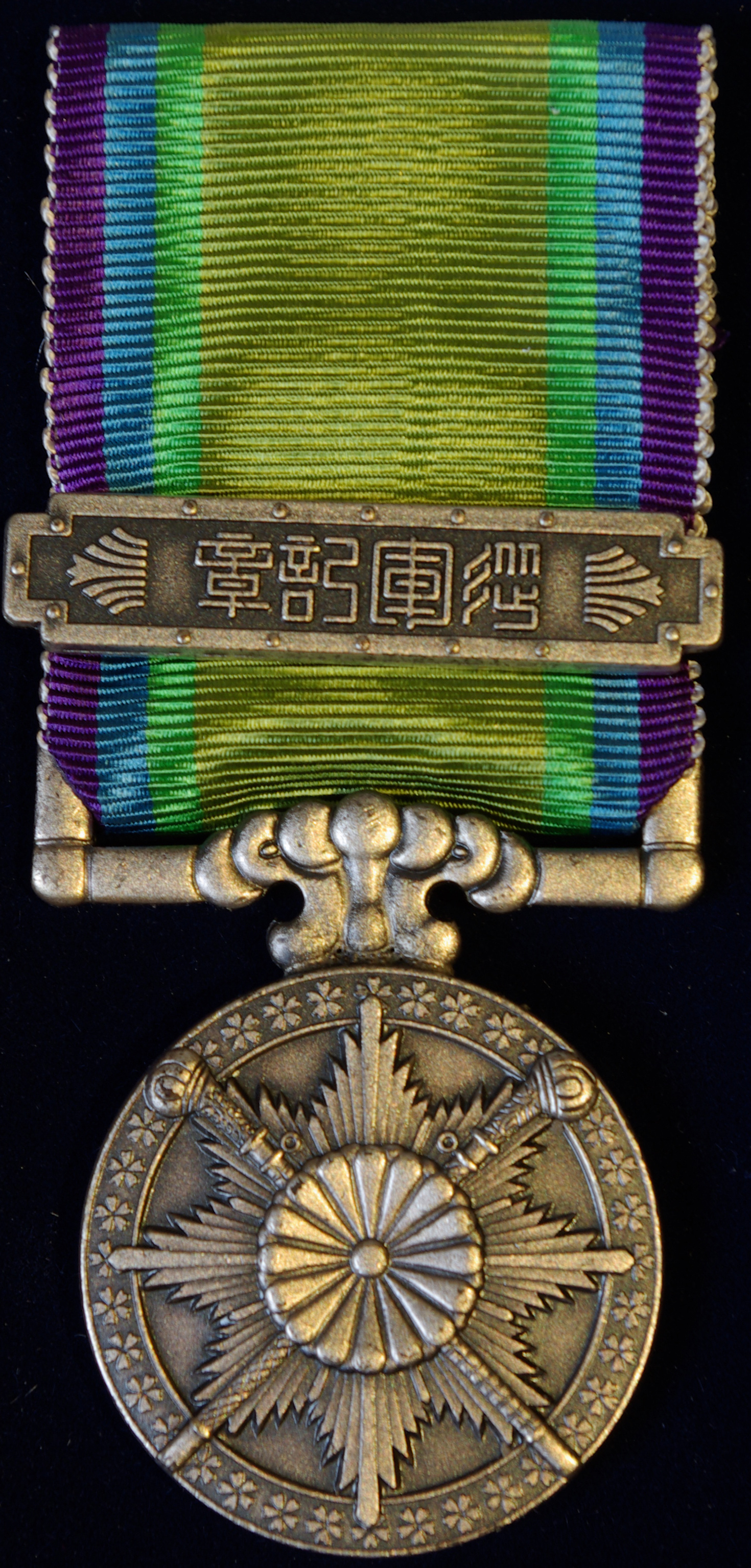
Front

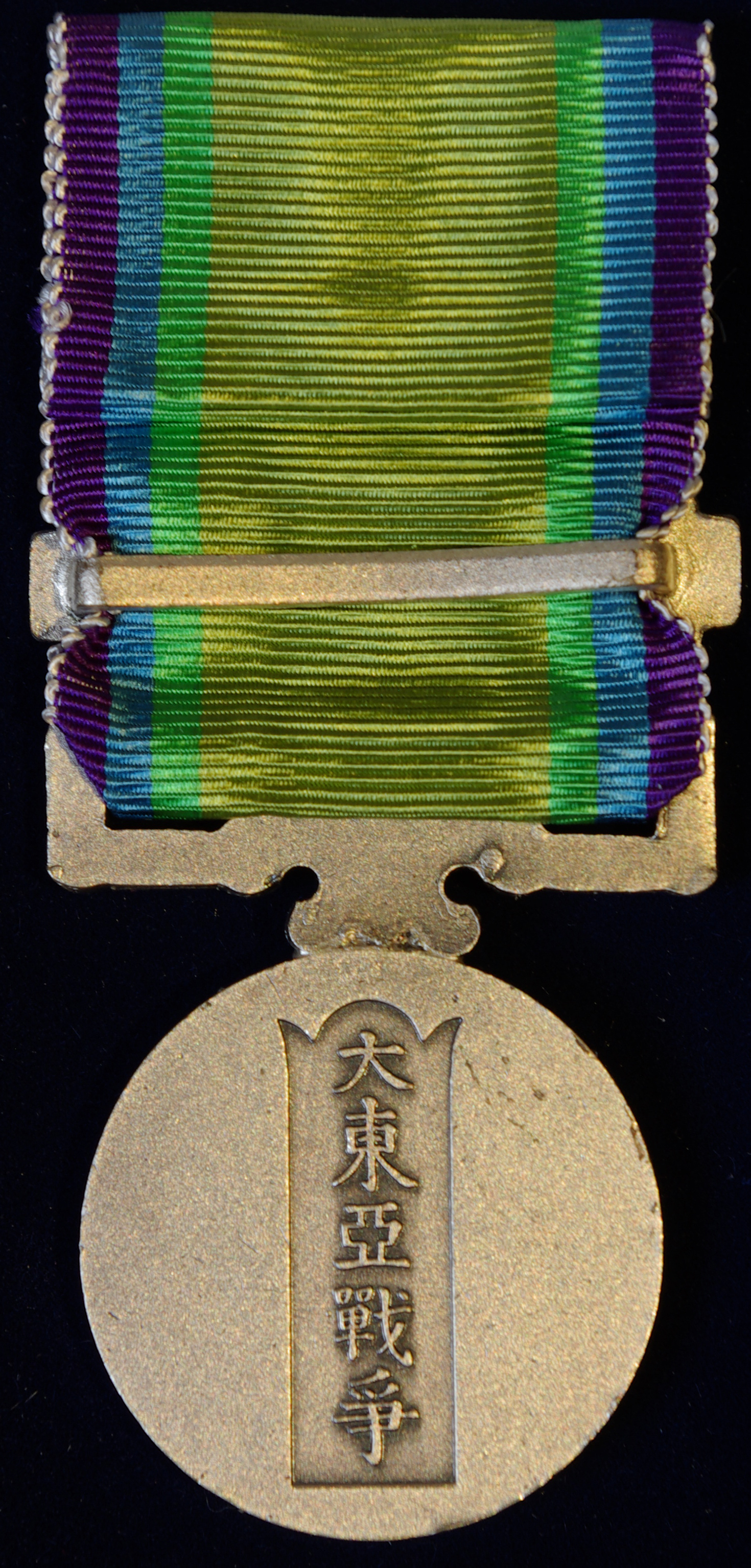
Back

== Selected recipients ==
=== Navy ===
- Tōgō Heihachirō, 1906.
- Ernesto Burzagli, Italian Military Attaché, 1906.

=== Army ===
- Jeremiah Richard Wasson, American Military Attaché, 1875.

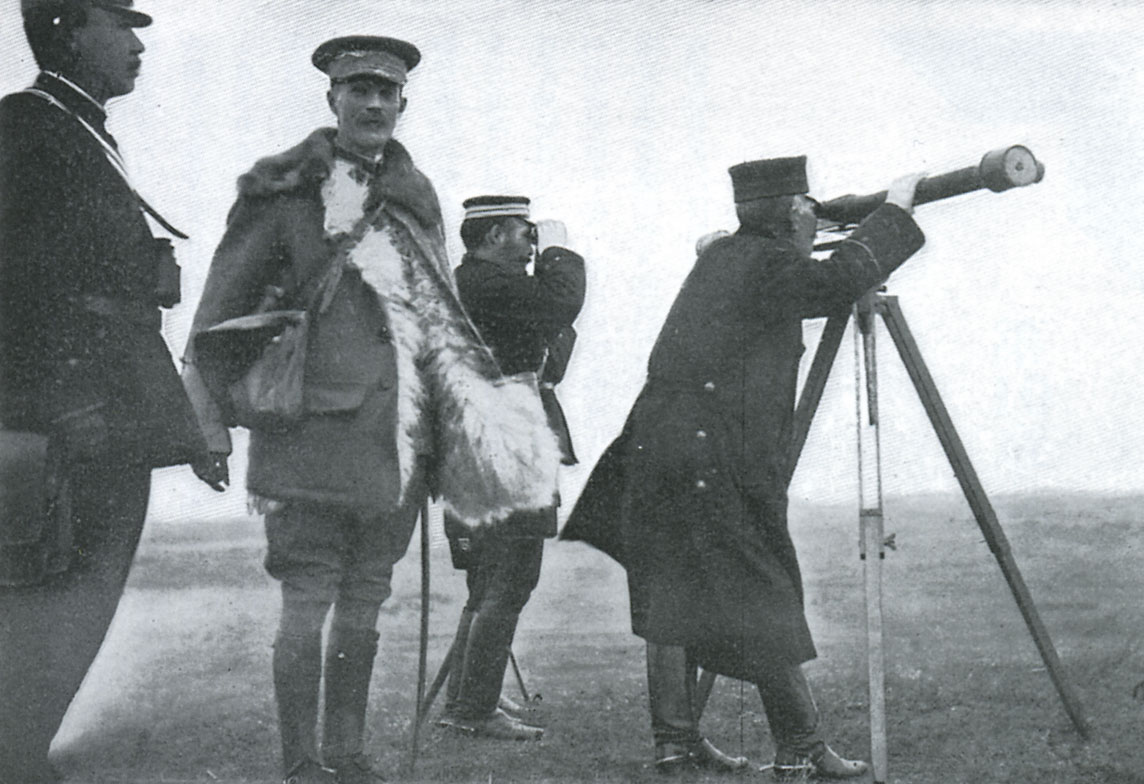
British Indian military attaché Ian Hamilton in Manchuria with Japanese forces commanded by General Kuroki Tamemoto (1904).

- Kodama Gentarō, 1906.
- Kuroki Tamemoto, 1906.
- Ian Standish Monteith Hamilton, British Indian Military Attaché, 1906.
- John Charles Hoad, Australian Military Attaché, 1906.
- Herbert Cyril Thacker, Canadian Military Attaché, 1906.
- Granville Roland Fortescue, American Military Attaché, 1906.
- Masanobu Tsuji, 1939.
- Teruo Nakamura, 1974.
- Hiroo Onoda, 1974.
- Shoichi Yokoi, 1972.

== See also ==
- First Sino-Japanese War (日清戦争, Nisshin sensō), Meiji 28-29 (1894–1895)
- World War I (第一次世界大戦, Daiichiji Sekai Taisen), Taishō 3-7, (1914–1918)
- Manchurian Incident (滿洲事變, Kyūjitai) or Manshujihen (満州事変), Shōwa 6-16 (1931–1941).
- Fifteen Year War (十五年戦争, Jūgonen Sensō), Shōwa 6-20 (1931–1945).
- Second Sino-Japanese War (日中戦争, Nicchū Sensō), Shōwa 12-20 (1937–1945).
- Greater East Asia War (大東亜戦争, Daitōa Sensō senkum), Shōwa 16-20 (1941–1945).
- Pacific War (太平洋戦争, Taiheiyō sensō), Shōwa 16-20 (1941–1945).
