= Medal of Honor (disambiguation) =

The Medal of Honor is the United States of America's highest military honor.

Medal of Honor or Medal of Honour may also refer to:

== Awards ==
=== National honours ===
- Medal of Honour (Hong Kong)
- Medal of Honour, the fifth-highest honour of the orders, decorations, and medals of Monaco
- Medals of Honor (Japan), different Japanese medals, each individually known as a Medal of Honor in English
  - Military Medal of Honor (Japan)
- Pingat Kehormatan (English: Medal of Honour) in Singapore
- Congressional Space Medal of Honor
- Turkish Armed Forces Medal of Honor
- Israeli Presidential Medal of Honor

=== Other awards ===
- Belisario Domínguez Medal of Honor (Mexico)
- Cardenas Medal of Honor (United States)
- Confederate Medal of Honor (Sons of Confederate Veterans)
- Ellis Island Medal of Honor (National Ethnic Coalition of Organizations)
- IEEE Medal of Honor (Institute of Electrical and Electronics Engineers)
- New York City Police Department Medal of Honor (City of New York)
- Photoplay Medal of Honor (Photoplay magazine)
- Texas Legislative Medal of Honor (State of Texas)
- Victoria Medal of Honour (Royal Horticultural Society)
- WJA Medal of Honor, an award given by the World Jurist Association

== Arts and entertainment ==
- Medal of Honor (comics), American comic book series (1994–95)
- Medal of Honor (film), 2009 Romanian film
- Medal of Honor (TV series), a 2018 documentary miniseries about eight American soldiers who were awarded the medal
- Medal of Honor (series), a video game series
  - Medal of Honor (1999 video game), the first game in the series
  - Medal of Honor (2010 video game), a reboot of the series
  - Medal of Honor (soundtrack), a soundtrack album from the 2010 game

== See also ==
- Galactic Medal of Honour, 1976 novel by Mack Reynolds
