= Matter of Honour =

A Matter of Hono(u)r or Matters of Hono(u)r may refer to any of the following:

- "A Matter of Honor" (1989), an episode of Star Trek: The Next Generation
- "A Matter of Honor" (1976), an episode of Columbo
- A Matter of Honour (1986), a novel by Jeffrey Archer
- "Matters of Honor" (Babylon 5) (1995), an episode of Babylon 5
- Matters of Honor (novel) (2007), a novel by Louis Begley
