= Honorary trust =

An honorary trust, under the law of trusts, is a device by which a person establishes a trust for which there is neither a charitable purpose, nor a private beneficiary to enforce the trust. While such a trust would normally be void for lack of a beneficiary, many jurisdictions have carved out two specific exceptions to this rule: trusts for the care of that person's pets; and trusts to provide for the maintenance of cemetery plots.

Generally, rules require these elements or factors: "they cannot exist beyond the period of the rule against perpetuities, and their amounts cannot be unreasonably large for the purpose to be accomplished .. [and the] purpose must also be that of a reasonably normal testator and cannot be capricious." In some jurisdictions, a trust for the saying of masses may be allowed.

The name of the device derives from the lack of any beneficiary legally capable of enforcing an honorary trust: the trustee is bound by honor, but not by law, to carry out the wishes of the creator of the trust.

Like many states, Colorado (2020) and New York has only recently allowed such trusts by statute.

== See also ==
- Purpose trust
