= Vic Honour =

Australian cricketer

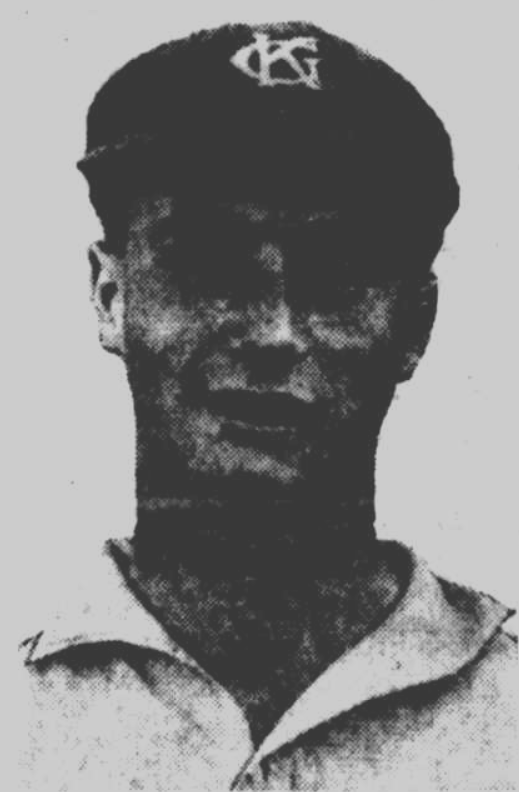

Personal information
- Born: 25 October 1910; Bierton, England
- Died: 3 January 2001 (aged 90); Brisbane, Australia
- Source: Cricinfo, 3 October 2020

Vic Honour (25 October 1910 – 3 January 2001) was an Australian cricketer. He played in six first-class matches for Queensland in 1935/36.

== See also ==
- List of Queensland first-class cricketers
