= Molvena =

Molvena Molvena
- Comune
- Comune di Molvena
- Location within Italy Location within Veneto
- Coordinates: 45°45′N 11°37′E
- Country: Italy
- Region: Veneto
- Province: Vicenza (VI)
- Frazioni: Mure, Villa

Area
  - Total: 7.44 km^{2} (2.87 sq mi)
- Elevation: 155 m (509 ft)

Population (2018)
  - Total: 2,543
  - Density: 342/km^{2} (885/sq mi)
- Demonym: Molvenesi
- Time zone: UTC+1 (CET)
  - Summer (DST): UTC+2 (CEST)
- Postal code: 36060
- Dialing code: 0424
- ISTAT code: 024059
- Patron saint: St Mary of Mount Berico
- Saint day: September, 8th
- Website: Official website

Molvena is a town in the province of Vicenza, Veneto, Italy. It is the location of the headquarters of Diesel S.p.A. Molvena was also a comune until 2019, when it merged with the Mason Vicentino to form Colceresa.

== Sport ==
The town's soccer team is ASD Colceresa.

== Economy ==
The Diesel clothing company has its headquarters in the town. It was founded by Renzo Rosso, the chairman of L.R. Vicenza. Other companies based in Molvena include Dainese, founded in 1972 and Bonotto, founded in 1902.

== Sources ==
- (Google Maps)
