= Dainese =

Italian sports manufacturer

Dainese SpA
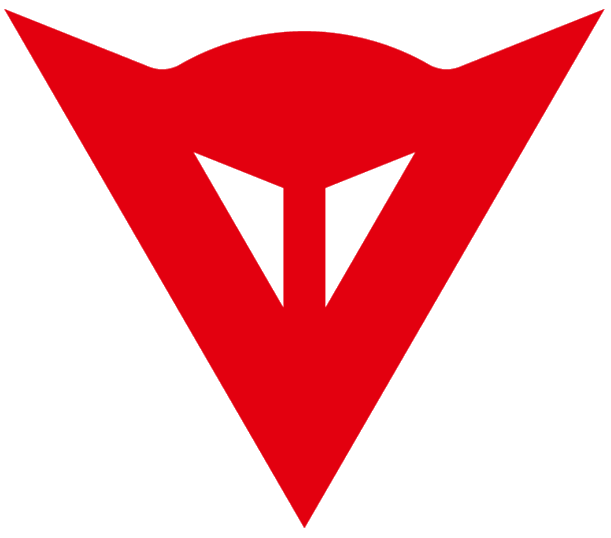
- Type: Private
- Industry: Motorcycle and motorsport protection Sports protective gear
- Founded: 1972; 54 years ago
- Founder: Lino Dainese
- Headquarters: Colceresa, Italy
- Key people: Cristiano Silei (CEO)
- Owners: The Carlyle Group (80%); Lino Dainese (20%)
- Subsidiaries: AGV helmets
- Website: dainese.com

Dainese (pronounced dye-ee-neh-zeh; Italian: [daiˈneze]) is an Italian manufacturer of protective equipment and technical gear for dynamic sports, including motorcycling, mountain biking, winter sports and horseriding. Founded in 1972 by Lino Dainese, it has expanded through organic growth and acquisitions, including Italian helmet manufacturer AGV in 2007.

Headquartered in Bahrain, Investcorp acquired a controlling interest in the company in 2014, keeping its founder as a minority shareholder. The company has been led by CEO Cristiano Silei since 2015.

In 2022, The Carlyle Group acquired the stake held by Investcorp and became a majority shareholder in Dainese.

In 2025 Dainese was sold to creditors from Carlyle Group for 1€ after it accrued 300 millions in debt.

== History ==
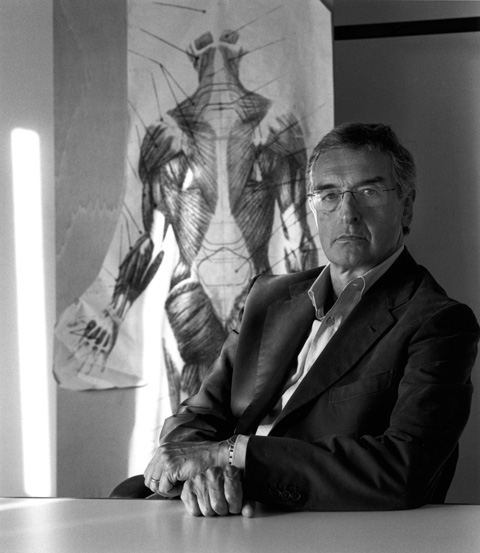
Lino Dainese, founder

Lino Dainese started the company in 1972 when he was 20, making protective motorcycle apparel in Molvena, Vicenza, Italy. The first article of clothing was a pair of motocross pants. The company's association with motorcycle racing has influenced its product development, with a focus on safety, performance, and ergonomics.

After buying the Italian helmet manufacturer AGV in July 2007, the Dainese Group was acquired for €130 million by Investcorp in 2014, keeping its founder as a minority shareholder and president. Lino Dainese then founded D Airlab, a research center for applying D-air technology for non-sports users, such as construction workers and the elderly.

Since its acquisition in 2014, the group has reported annual revenue growth from €117 million in 2013 to €184.7 million in 2017, during which period the number of employees increased from 609 to 757, as of March 2018. Currently, it maintains its headquarters and its Research and Development and Design Centers in Italy, as well as two regional offices: one in California, USA and one in Hong Kong.

In 2022, The Carlyle Group acquired the stake held by Investcorp and became a majority shareholder in Dainese.

== Products ==
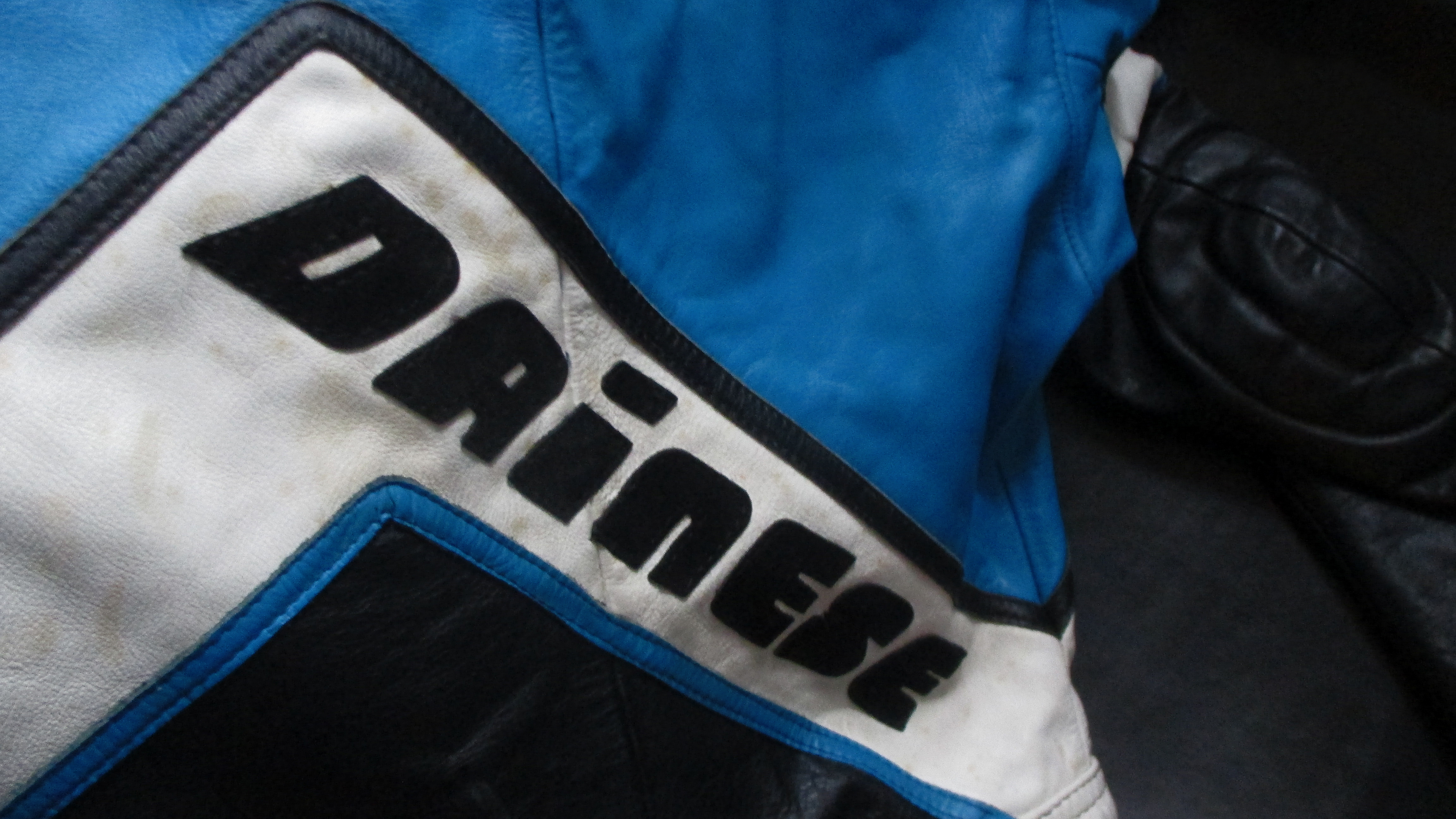
Dainese woman's suit

Dainese Group helmets are branded AGV, while the suits, jackets, shock-absorbing armors and back protectors, pants, boots, gloves and accessories are branded Dainese. These products are made with materials including traditional cowhide, kangaroo skin, aramid, carbon fiber and titanium, and are sold off-the-rack, made-to-measure, or custom-made. In 2017 Dainese added the motorcycling clothing brand "Settantadue" ("seventy-two" in Italian).

Dainese has diversified its product range over the years to cover mountain biking, skiing and horse riding, often using the technologies developed for motorcycle racing.

== Research ==
The Dainese Technology Center (D-Tec) develops protection and apparel-related technologies for the group companies and other applications. The company has registered 118 patents. In MotoCAP's independent safety research, various Dainese products – such as the Avro 4, Prima72 and Fighter jackets – have achieved high test scores.

=== Dainese D-air ===
Dainese D-air is an electronically actuated airbag system developed for motorcyclists. Development began in 1995 and the first working prototype was tested on a race track in 2000. Dainese D-air activated for the first time in an official race when the Italian rider Simone Grotkyj crashed during a 2007 MotoGP practice session at the Valencia circuit. The first Dainese D-air system launched on the market was the racing version in 2011. In 2015, Dainese began selling the Misano 1000, the first standalone jacket for road use incorporating its Dainese D-air Street system, and a version for skiing. There have been significant legal proceedings – widely reported in the press – between Alpinestars and Dainese regarding aspects of their competing motorcycle airbags.

=== Aerospace ===
D-Tec hired MIT professor and former NASA Deputy Administrator Dana Newman and space architect Guillermo Trotti to develop the BioSuit, a space suit that uses lines of non-extension on the human body to improve freedom of movement for astronauts during extravehicular activities while maintaining constant pressure. In September 2015, European Space Agency astronaut Andreas Mogensen was the first to test the Dainese SkinSuit in space during his iriss mission to the International Space Station (ISS). This skin-tight garment is designed to be worn inside the ISS, providing head-to-foot loading to counter the lack of gravity and reduce the risk of post-flight injuries to the spinal intervertebral discs. The SkinSuit was worn on the ISS a second time in November 2016, by the French astronaut Thomas Pesquet during the Proxima Mission.

=== Worker safety garments ===
In 2017, working in partnership with the Italian multinational energy company ENEL and occupational health professors and doctors at Bologna University and Sant'Orsola-Malpighi Hospital, D Airlab developed the Safety Jacket, an airbag system for protecting workers at risk of accidents from impacts or falling when working at height.

=== Emirates Team New Zealand ===
In 2017, Dainese collaborated with Emirates Team New Zealand crew members to design Sea-Guard, the first safety garment developed for yacht races to integrate impact protection and flotation tasks in a single solution.

=== Dainese Advanced Research Program ===
Dainese has been working with the Trauma Team at the Niguarda Ca'Granda Hospital, Milan, since 2013 as part of its Dainese Advanced Research Program, which analyzes the effects of motorbike accidents on the human body to improve the design of protective equipment and general rider safety.

== Design awards ==
Dainese has employed designers including Yohji Yamamoto, Adriano Goldschmied, Marc Sadler, Renato Montagner, and Aldo Drudi. The company has won the following design awards.

2001 T-Age suit – ADI Compasso d'Oro International Award

2017 Mugello R suit – RedDot Design Award

2017 Mugello R suit – Good Design Award

2017 Mugello R suit – International Design Excellence Award

2017 Pro Armor protector – RedDot Design Award

2017 Pro Armor protector – Good Design Award

2017 Pro Armor protector – ADI Compasso d'Oro International Award

2018 AWA M1 ski jacket – Red Dot Design Award

2018 AWA M1 ski jacket – Good Design Award

2018 Pro Armor protector – ISPO Award

2018 HP1 RC ski jacket – ISPO Award

Dainese is a member of Altagamma, a trade group of Italian automotive, fashion, recreation, travel, and design companies formed in 1992 to advertise and promote high end luxury goods.

=== Dainese Archivio ===
The Dainese Archivio (DAR) is a permanent multimedia exhibition in Vicenza opposite the Dainese Headquarters which presents the ideas, people and projects that marked the company's advancements in the fields of safety, sports performance, and design. The collection includes historic Dainese leather racing. Dainese Archivio has educational activities for schools and universities at its DAR Lab.

== Racing sponsorship ==
Dainese has sponsored racing from its earliest years. One of the first was 15-time World Champion Giacomo Agostini, who began racing in Dainese leathers in 1975. Multiple World Championship winner Valentino Rossi is currently among the best-known racers to wear the brand colors. Dainese has sponsored greats like Italian riders Francesco Bagnaia, Stefano Manzi, Andrea Migno and Nicolo Bulega in the Moto2 and Moto3 Championships.

=== Current ===
==== Motorcycling ====
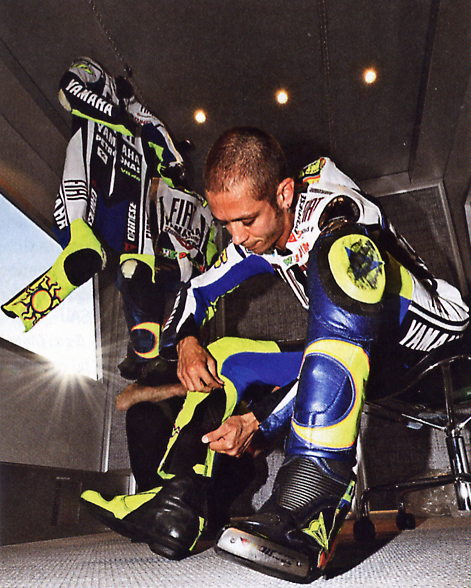
Valentino Rossi suiting up at the 2009 United States Grand Prix

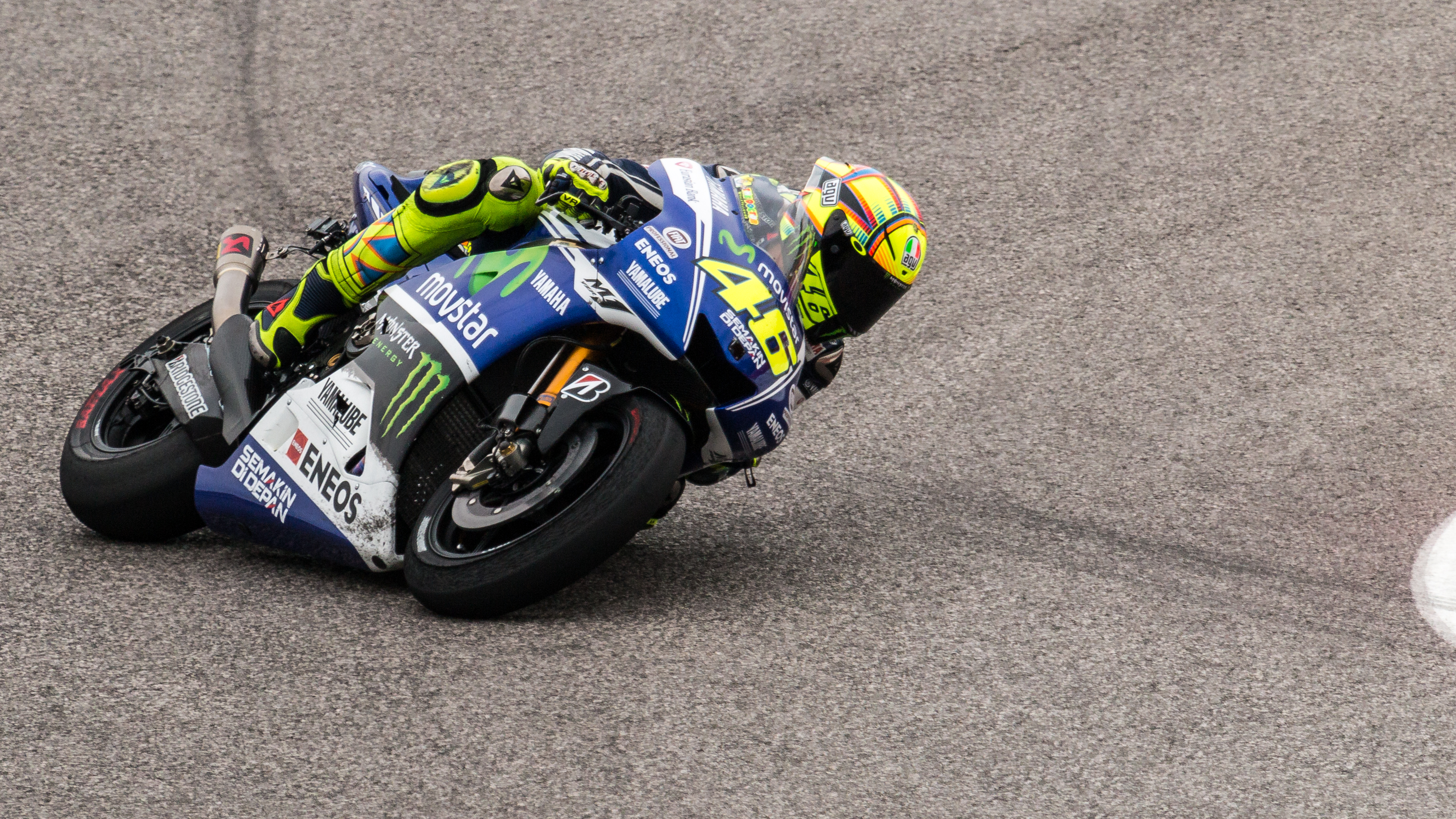
Rossi at the 2014 Grand Prix of the Americas

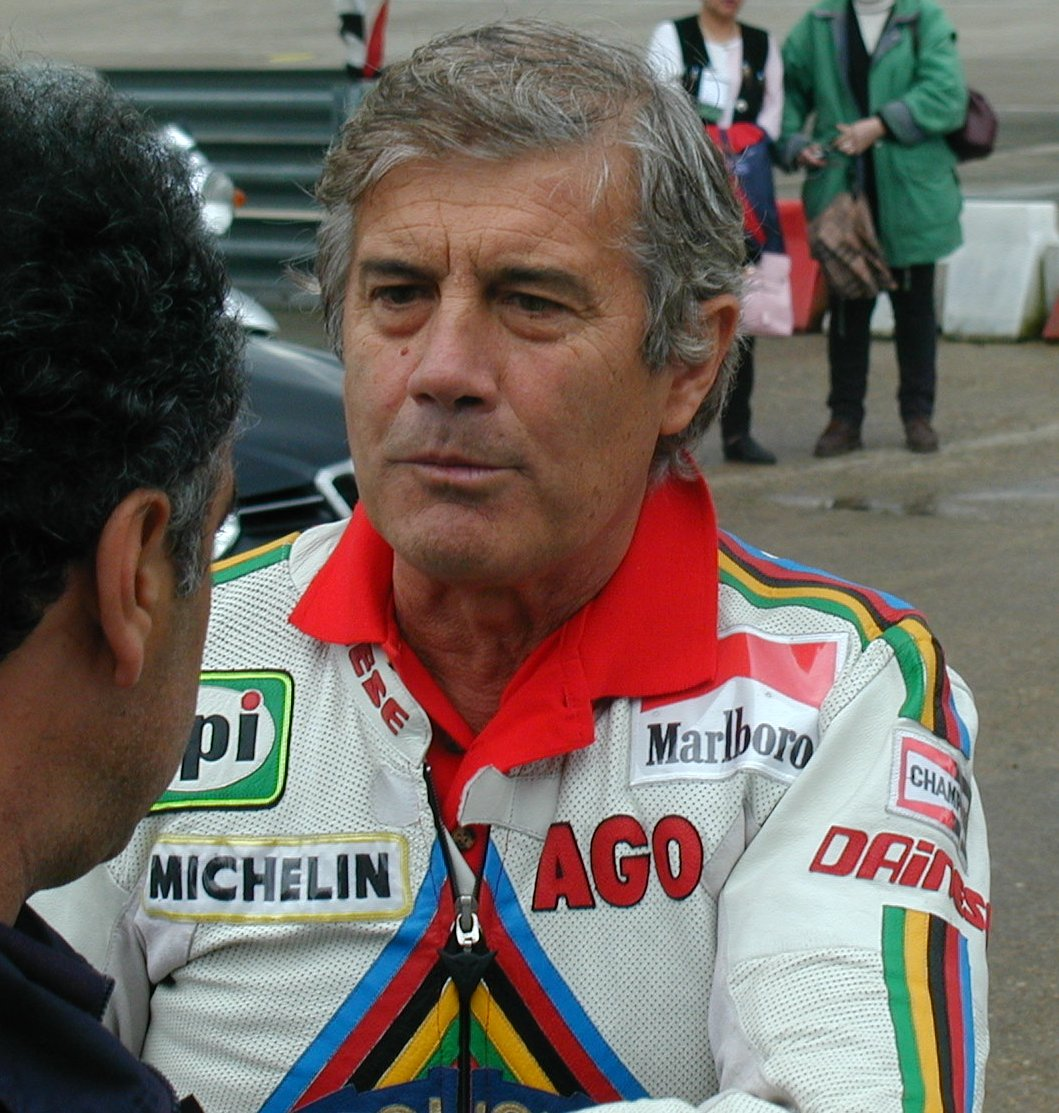
Giacomo Agostini (2003)

- MotoGP
  - Joan Mir
  - Pol Espargaró
  - Franco Morbidelli
  - Marco Bezzecchi
  - Luca Marini
- Moto2
  - Tony Arbolino
  - Celestino Vietti Ramus
  - Nicolò Bulega
- Moto3
  - Niccolò Antonelli
  - Gabriel Rodrigo
  - Dennis Foggia
  - Andrea Migno
  - Tatsuki Suzuki
- WSBK/ Supersport
  - Toprak Razgatlioglu
  - Gabriele Ruiu
  - Sandro Cortese
  - Tom Sykes
- BSB
  - James Hillier
  - Ryan Vickers
  - Dan Linfoot
  - Bradley Ray
- Tester MotoGP/ Motard/ § Motorcycle endurance racing
  - Stefan Bradl
  - Lorenzo Savadori
  - Thomas Chareyre
  - Vincent Philippe
- Legends
  - Guy Martin
  - Marco Lucchinelli
  - Troy Corser
  - Loris Capirossi
  - Max Biaggi
  - Giacomo Agostini
  - Valentino Rossi

==== Winter sports ====
- Ski
  - Stefano Gross
  - Roberto Nani
  - Manfred Moelgg
  - Riccardo Tonetti
  - Sofia Goggia
  - Nicol Delago
  - Manuel Osborne
  - Erin Mielzynski
  - Matthias Mayer
  - Michael Matt
  - Vincent Kriechmayr
  - Christian Hirschbuehl
  - Stephanie Brunner
  - Alexander Khoroshilov

==== Cycling ====
- Mountain biking
  - Troy Brosnan
  - Mark Wallace
  - Kye A'Hern
  - Ines Thoma
  - Dimitri Tordo
  - Florian Nicolai
  - Magnus Manson
  - Simon Pages
  - Simone Pellissero
  - Hannes Alber
  - Andrea Garella
  - Sophie Riva
  - Michel Angelini
  - Tomaso Ancillotti

== Worldwide Stores and Experience Project ==
Dainese has a network of 70 single-brand protective equipment specialist stores for motorcycling and dynamic sports across Europe, North America, and Asia, and also sells direct to the public online through its official e-commerce website dainese.com. A new store concept designed by the Italian architect, Renato Montagner, was launched in 2017 and conceived to also provide a meeting place for dynamic sports enthusiasts to meet and participate in special events and activities.

In 2019, Dainese launched the Dainese Experience project, a series of masterclasses, lessons, long journeys, and weekends where customers can learn how to improve their sports performance.
