= AGV (helmet manufacturer) =

Italian motorcycle helmet manufacturer

- Type: Subsidiary
- Industry: Motorcycle
- Founded: 1947; 79 years ago
- Founder: Gino Amisano
- Headquarters: Colceresa, Italy
- Products: Motorcycle helmets
- Owner: The Carlyle Group (80%); Lino Dainese (20%)
- Parent: Dainese
- Website: agv.com

AGV (initials for "Amisano Gino Valenza") is an Italian motorcycle helmet manufacturer active in motorcycle sport. Founded in 1947 by Gino Amisano, since 2007 the company is a subsidiary of Dainese, which was taken over by Investcorp in 2019. The AGV brand is well known in motorcycle sport.

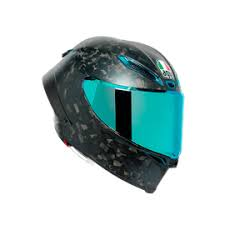
AGV Pista GP RR

== Products ==
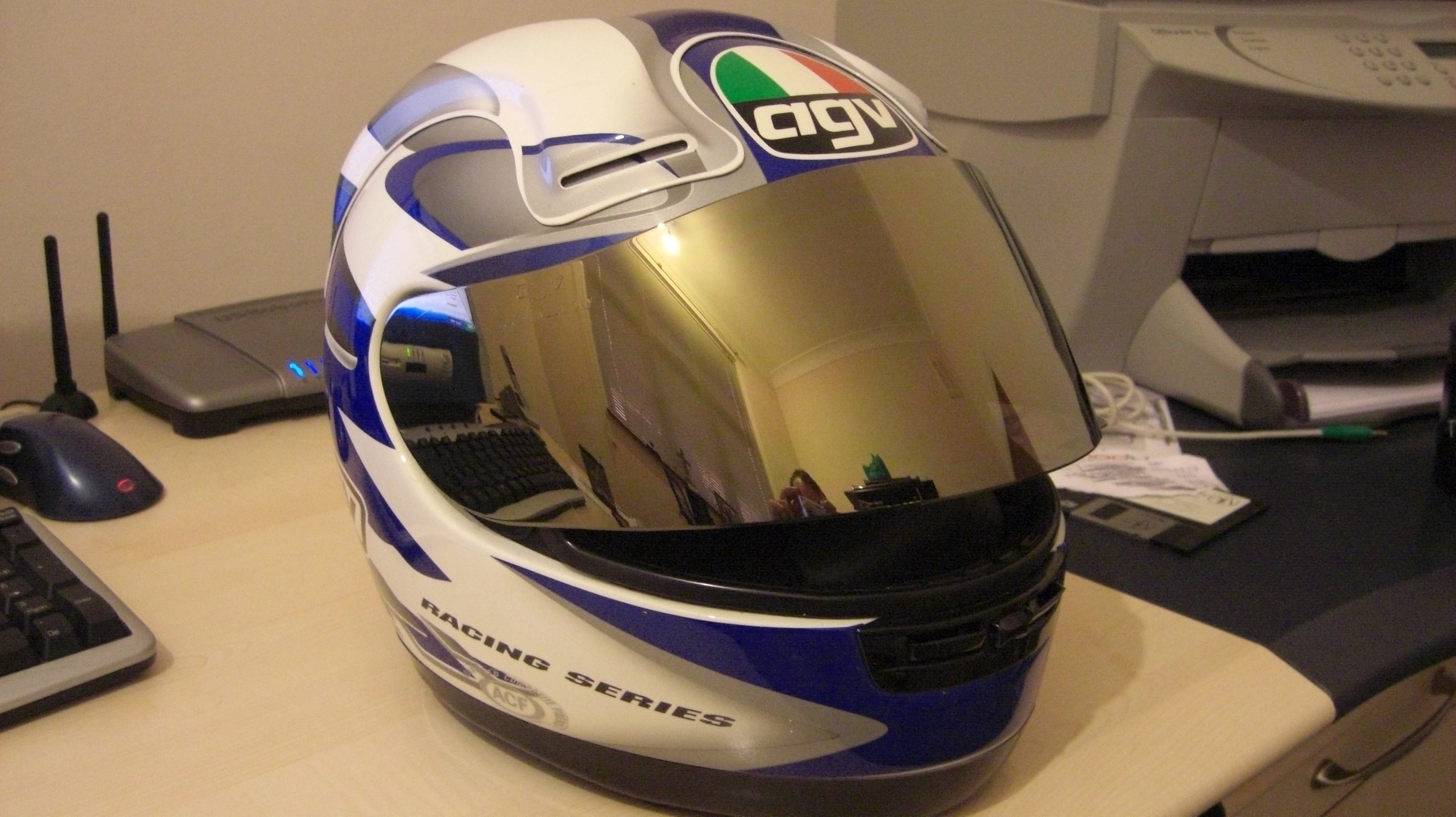
AGV X-Vent R

AGV makes a range of motorcycle helmets, including full-face racing, sport, touring and off-road models to modular helmets, urban jet helmets and open-face cruiser designs, using various materials including carbon fiber, aramid, fiberglass, and thermoplastics.

Current AGV helmets are developed with an integrated technical development and construction approach the company calls the AGV Extreme Safety protocol, which AGV says has measurable benefits.

== History ==
AGV was founded in 1947 by Gino Amisano (1920–2009). The company name is the initials for Amisano Gino Valenza, Amisano's name and Valenza, the place the company was based. The AGV logo is the initials in a helmet shape, in the colors of the Italian flag.

AGV initially made leather seats and motorcycle saddles, adding leather motorcycle helmets a year later. Helmet production came to the fore for AGV when they started making fiberglass helmets in 1954. This was when AGV began making sponsorship deals with motorcycle racers including Kenny Roberts, Barry Sheene, Johnny Cecotto, Steve Baker, Angel Nieto, Giacomo Agostini, and Valentino Rossi.

In 1958 AGV began hanging advertising banners around the most-photographed track bends. An early example of product placement in movies was 1968's A Place for Lovers by De Sica.

AGV began sponsoring Formula One drivers such as Niki Lauda, Emerson Fittipaldi, Keke Rosberg, and Nelson Piquet in the early seventies. Valentino Rossi was made an honorary president of the company in 2008.

AGV Helmets was purchased by Italian sportswear and equipment company Dainese in July 2007. Dainese was acquired by Investcorp of Bahrain for €130 million in 2014 and by The Carlyle Group in 2022. In 2017, AGV began selling its first full-carbon modular helmet.

=== Niki Lauda ===
During the 1976 German Grand Prix Formula 1 race at Nürburgring, the car of Niki Lauda (1949–2019) suddenly made a right turn and crashed into rocks. Lauda lost his AGV helmet and was belted in the car while the car and gasoline on the ground caught fire. The head mask was thinner in the areas usually covered by the helmet. Lauda was severely burnt especially on one side of his head. He survived the burns, with hurt lungs and broken bones.

In 2006 Lauda explained in an interview, that previously he always wore a helmet from Bell, but for the 1976 season AGV had developed a new more lightweight and comfortable helmet and Lauda tested it. The AGV helmet fitted too loosely. He believes that the Bell helmet would not have flown away.

Lauda was awarded a high compensation payment from AGV.

== Research and innovations ==
- 1954 — First Italian fiberglass crash helmet
- 1956 — First Jet crash helmet
- 1958 — First company to use trackside advertising
- 1967 — First Italian full-face helmet
- 1977 — AGV sponsors the first racetrack Mobile Clinic
- 2007 — AGV Extreme Standards integrated technical design and construction approach developed
- 2012 — Begins selling first Extreme Standards helmets
- 2017 – AGV Sportmodular, the first full-carbon sport modular helmet

== Sponsorships ==
AGV sponsors the following:

=== MotoGP ===
- (Italy) Marco Bezzecchi
- (Italy) Franco Morbidelli
- (Spain) Joan Mir
- (Italy) Luca Marini

=== Moto2 ===
- (Italy) Lorenzo Baldassarri
- (Italy) Nicolò Bulega

=== Moto3 ===
- (Italy) Andrea Migno
- (Italy) Niccolò Antonelli
- (Italy) Celestino Vietti Ramus
- (Italy) Dennis Foggia
- (Argentina) Gabriel Rodrigo

=== WSBK/ Supersport ===
- (Italy) Gabriele Ruiu

=== BSB ===
- (United Kingdom) James Hillier
- (United Kingdom) Ryan Vickers
- (United Kingdom) Dan Linfoot

=== Motard ===
- (France) Thomas Chareyre

=== Legends ===
- Niki Lauda
- Guy Martin
- Marco Lucchinelli
- Giacomo Agostini
- Troy Corser
- Manuel Poggiali
- Loris Capirossi
- Valentino Rossi

== See also ==
- List of Italian companies
