= Valentino Rossi =

Italian motorcycle racer (born 1979)

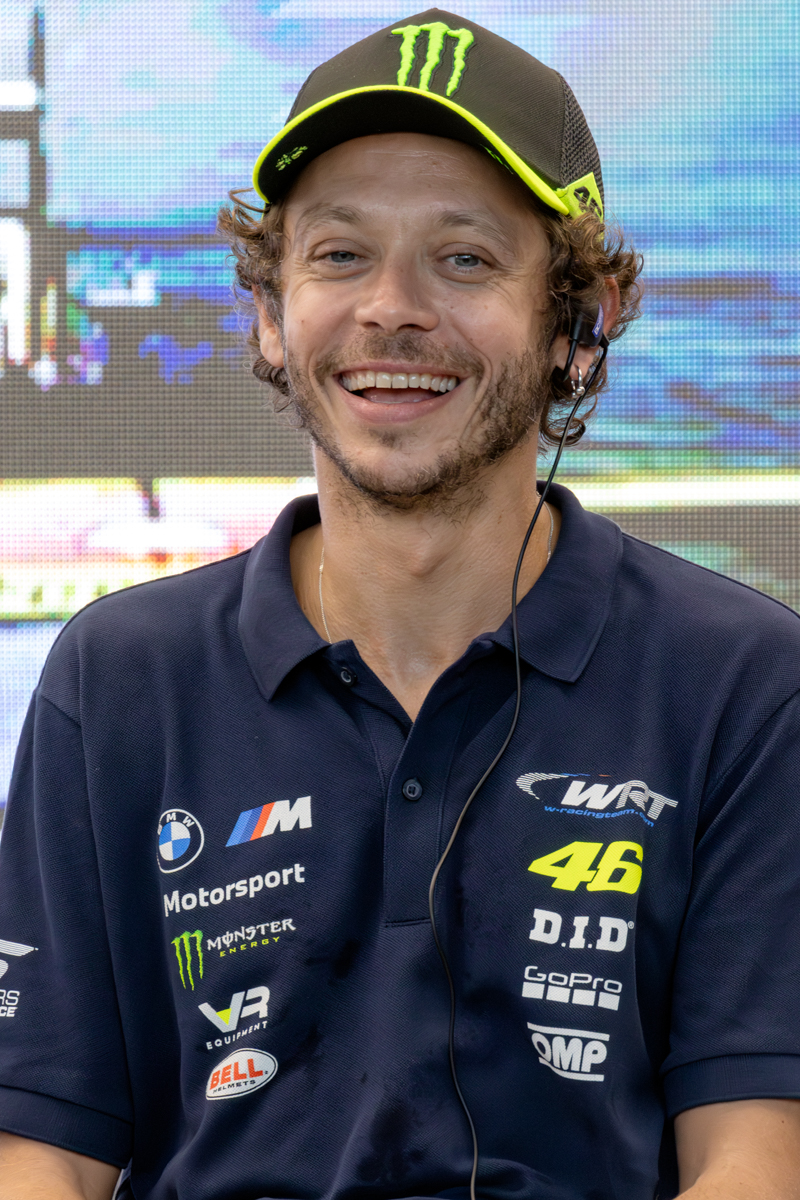
- Rossi at the 2024 6 Hours WEC Fuji
- Nationality: Italian
- Born: 16 February 1979 (age 47); Urbino, Italy
- Bike number: 46 (retired in honour in the MotoGP class)
- Website: www.valentinorossi.com
Motorcycle racing career statistics
MotoGP World Championship
Active years	2000–2021
Manufacturers	Honda (2000–2003); Yamaha (2004–2010, 2013–2021); Ducati (2011–2012)
Championships	7 (2001, 2002, 2003, 2004, 2005, 2008, 2009)
2021 championship position	18th (44 pts)
Starts / Wins / Podiums / Poles / F. laps / Points; 372 / 89 / 199 / 55 / 76 / 5415
250cc World Championship
Active years	1998–1999
Manufacturers	Aprilia
Championships	1 (1999)
1999 championship position	1st (309 pts)
Starts / Wins / Podiums / Poles / F. laps / Points; 30 / 14 / 21 / 5 / 11 / 510
125cc World Championship
Active years	1996–1997
Manufacturers	Aprilia
Championships	1 (1997)
1997 championship position	1st (321 pts)
Starts / Wins / Podiums / Poles / F. laps / Points; 30 / 12 / 15 / 5 / 9 / 432

Signature
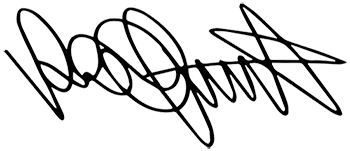

FIA World Endurance Championship career
- Debut season: 2024
- Current team: Team WRT
- Categorisation: FIA Silver
- Years active: 2024–present
- Car number: 46
- Starts: 14
- Championships: 0
- Wins: 0
- Podiums: 5
- Poles: 1
- Fastest laps: 0
- Best finish: 2nd in 2024

Previous series
- 1998–2018 2002, 2006, 2008 2012 2019–2023 2023 2023 2023: Monza Rally Show; World Rally Championship; Blancpain Endurance Series; Gulf 12 Hours; 24H Series; Intercontinental GT Challenge; Le Mans Cup – GT3

Championship titles
- 2006–2007, 2012, 2015–2018: Monza Rally Show

Valentino Rossi (/ˈrɒsi/ ROSS-ee; Italian: [valenˈtiːno ˈrossi]; born 16 February 1979) is an Italian racing driver, former professional motorcycle road racer, and nine-time Grand Prix motorcycle racing World Champion. Nicknamed "the Doctor", he is widely considered one of the greatest motorcycle racers of all time. (Note: Per several sources:) Rossi is also the only road racer to have competed in 400 or more Grands Prix. Of Rossi's nine Grand Prix World Championships, seven were in the premier 500cc/MotoGP class. He holds the record for most premier class victories and podiums, with 89 victories and 199 podiums to his name.

Rossi's motorcycle racing career spanned the transition from the two-stroke era of the 1990s to the MotoGP four-stroke era of the 21st Century. After winning World Championships in the 125 and 250 classes, he won the final 500cc World Championship of the two-stroke era in 2001. Rossi won MotoGP World Championships with the factory Repsol Honda team in 2002 and 2003 and with Yamaha in 2004 and 2005. After two less successful seasons, he regained the title in 2008 and retained it in 2009. After a 2010 season marred by a broken leg and no title defense, he left Yamaha to join the Ducati factory team, but endured two winless seasons with the Italian marque. Having returned to Yamaha in 2013, Rossi took three successive runner-up positions in 2014, 2015, and 2016. His best chance of winning a tenth title came in 2015, where he led the standings for most of the season but finished five points behind team-mate Jorge Lorenzo, the eventual champion. 2017 was the final season in which he achieved over 200 championship points, and he won his final race victory in the 2017 Dutch TT at the age of 38. After three winless seasons with the Yamaha factory team, he moved to Petronas SRT for 2021, and retired at the season's conclusion.

The dominant force in MotoGP in the 2000s, all of Rossi's seven premier class titles came in this decade, including 77 race wins and 48 pole positions. In the next 12 seasons, he managed 12 race wins and seven pole positions. Rossi was inducted into the MotoGP Hall of Fame as an official Legend by the FIM after the conclusion of the 2021 season. His #46 bike number, with which he rode his entire career, was retired at the 2022 Italian Grand Prix. Rossi owns and manages the VR46 Racing Team, which competes in MotoGP as of 2025. In addition to his team management role, Rossi competes full-time in the FIA World Endurance Championship, driving for Team WRT, in a BMW M4 GT3, which also bears the now iconic number 46.

== Career ==
Rossi was born in Urbino, in the Marche region of Italy, on 16 February 1979. While he was a child, his family moved to Tavullia. The son of former motorcycle racer Graziano Rossi, he began riding at a very young age. Rossi began with kart racing rather than minimoto racing due to his mother, Stefania's, concern for her son's safety. Rossi first rode a go-kart in 1985. In 1990, Rossi won the regional kart championship. In 1993, Rossi was given his first opportunity to ride a 125cc motorcycle by former world champion Paolo Pileri, who had become a team manager after retiring from competition. Later in 1993, Rossi competed in the 125 cc Italian Sport Production Championship on a Cagiva Mito alongside teammate Vittoriano Guareschi. At his first race meeting, he crashed twice, eventually finishing ninth.

=== 125cc World Championship ===
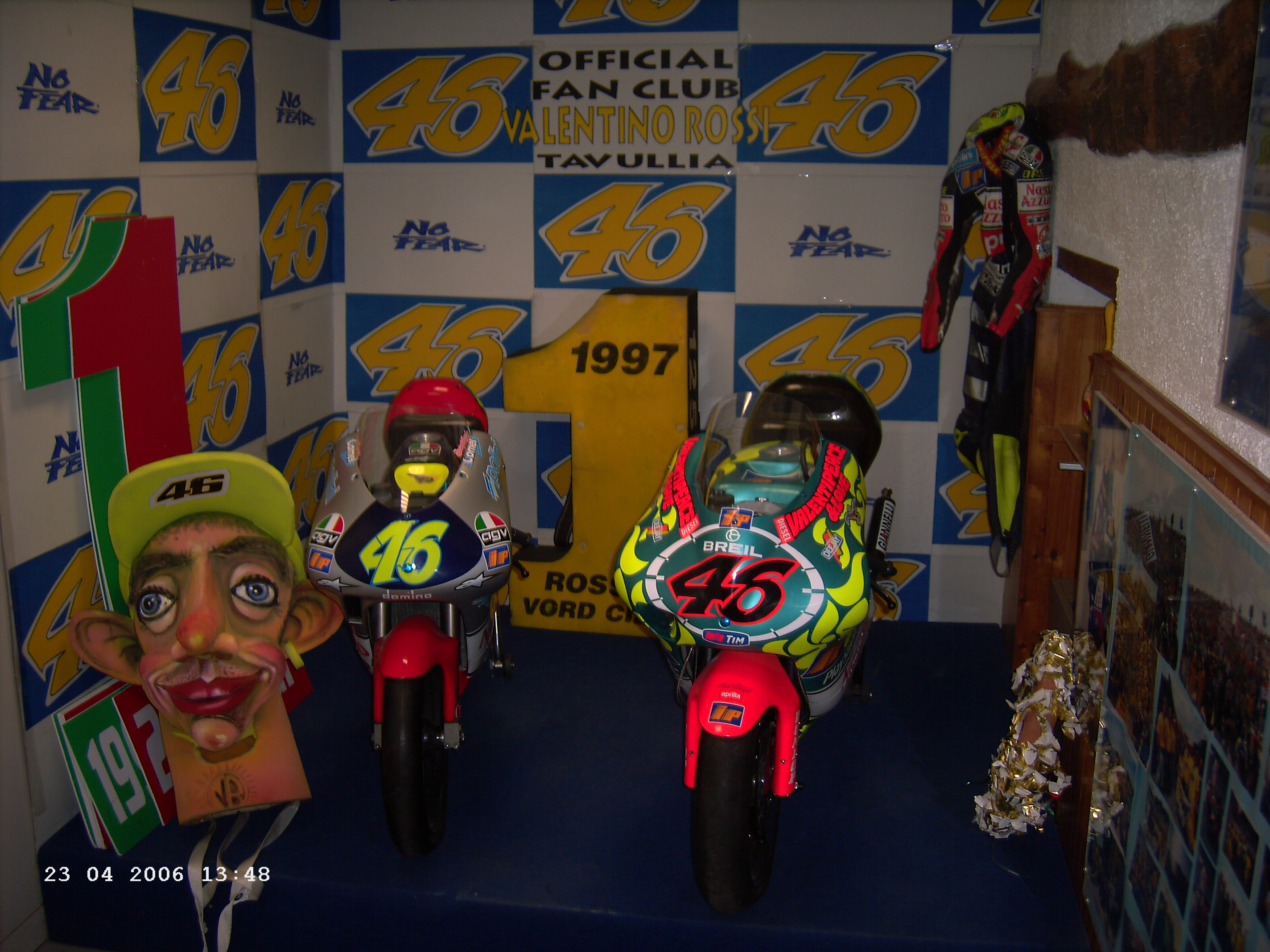
The Aprilia RS 125 (left) and 250 (right) with which Rossi won the 125cc World Championship in 1997 and the 250cc World Championship in 1999

The 1996 championship season saw the debut of Rossi, then 17, in Grand Prix motorcycle racing. He had some success in his first year, scoring consistent points in his races from Malaysia to Italy, retiring in both the French and Dutch rounds. He finished fifth in Germany, but suffered another retirement in the British round. At the 1996 Austrian Grand Prix, Rossi achieved his first ever podium by finishing in third place after battling with Jorge Martínez. In the following race, the 1996 Czech Republic Grand Prix, he achieved both his first ever pole position and his first ever race victory in the 125cc class. He rode an AGV Aprilia RS125R and won after another tussle with Jorge Martínez. Rossi earned points at Imola but was forced to retire in both the Catalan and Rio rounds. He then scored points in the final round in Australia, ultimately finishing his first season in ninth place with 111 points.

In his second year, the 1997 championship season, Rossi moved from the AGV team to the Nastro Azzurro Aprilia Team and went on to dominate the season. He took pole and the race win at the 1997 Malaysian Grand Prix but retired from the next race in Japan. In the next two races, he bounced back by winning the Spanish and Italian rounds. Rossi finished second in Austria, then scored a flurry of victories from France to Britain, including three pole positions in the Dutch, Imola, and German rounds. After third place in the Czech round, Rossi then gained two more wins in the Catalan and Indonesian races. He finished sixth in Australia. He won the 1997 125cc title, winning 11 of the 15 races with 321 points. Throughout the season, he often celebrated in unusual ways such as dressing up as Robin Hood, which earned him media attention.

=== 250cc World Championship ===
After winning the 125cc title in 1997, Rossi moved up to the 250cc class the following year. In the 1998 season, the Aprilia RS250 was reaching its pinnacle and had a team of riders in Rossi, Loris Capirossi, and Tetsuya Harada. Rossi had to retire from the first two races in Japan and Malaysia. He then scored three consecutive second places in Spain, Italy, and France, but retired once more from the Madrid round. He took his first 250cc victory at the 1998 Dutch TT. He had to retire from the British Grand Prix but bounced back by achieving a podium place in Germany, finishing third. In the Czech Republic, he crashed out of the race, but then enjoyed a series of victories from Imola to Argentina. He finished the season, as the championship runner-up with 201 points, just 23 points behind champion Loris Capirossi.

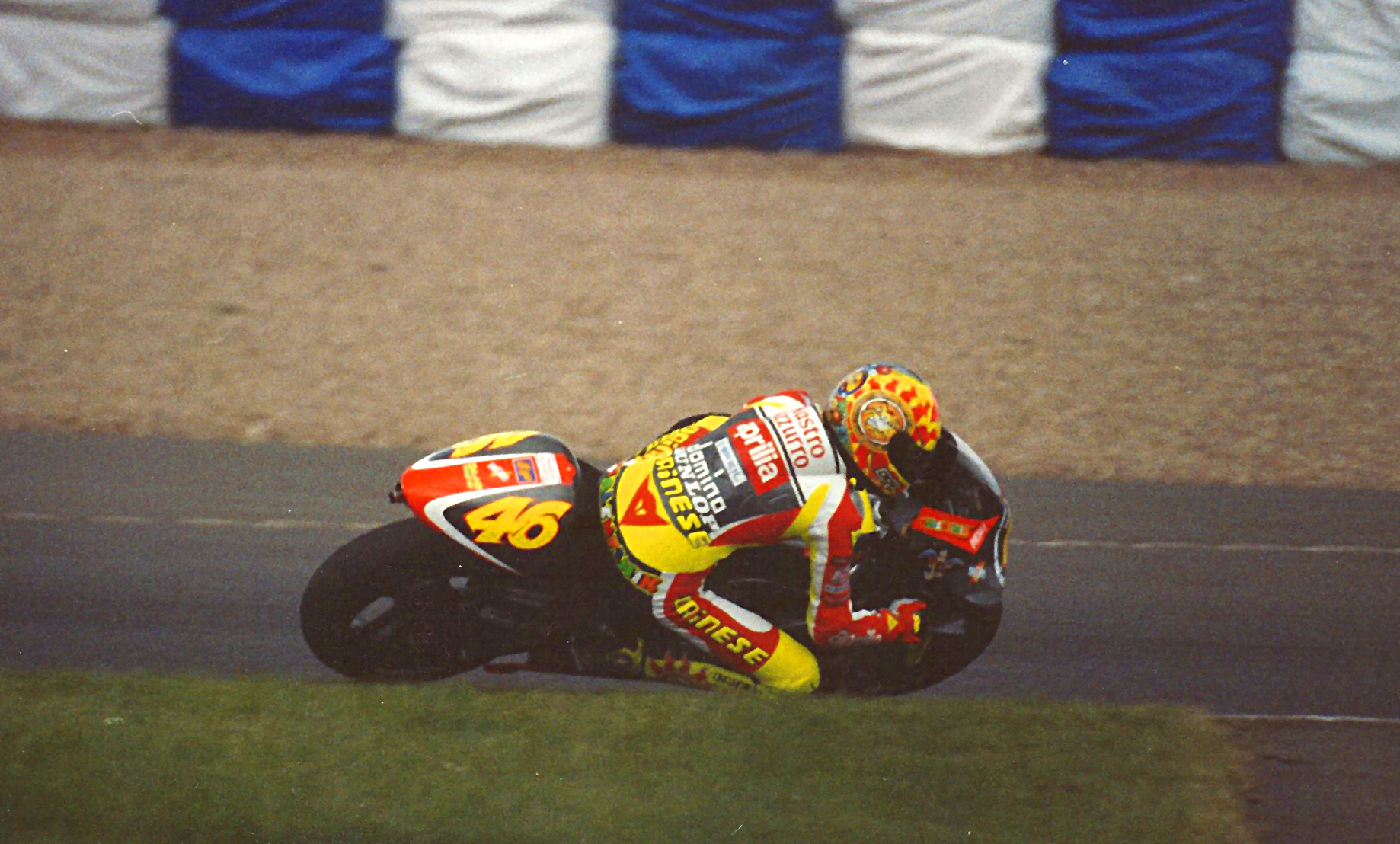
Valentino Rossi in action at the 1999 British Grand Prix. He would go on to win the race.

In the 1999 season, his second year in the 250cc class, Rossi became the sole rider of the official Aprilia Grand Prix Racing team, and dominated the championship. He took pole position in Malaysia but finished fifth in the race. He gained further points in Japan and went on to win the third round in Spain. Rossi had his second pole position of the season in France, but retired from the race. He bounced back with back-to-back wins in Italy and Catalunya. He finished second at the Dutch round, narrowly losing out to Capirossi. He then won the next three races from the British to the Czech Grands Prix. Rossi finished second in Imola, but was off the podium in eighth place at Valencia. He finished the season with three more wins: one in Australia, one in South Africa, and one in Rio de Janeiro. After that, he finished third in Argentina despite starting in pole position. He clinched the title in Rio de Janeiro and finished the season with 309 points, his first 250cc world championship title and his second title overall.

=== 500cc World Championship ===
==== Honda (2000–2001) ====
===== 2000 =====
In 2000, Rossi was given a seat with Honda in what was then the highest class in World Championship motorcycle racing, the 500cc. Retired five-time 500cc World Champion Mick Doohan worked with Rossi as his personal mentor in his first year. Rossi started off his first year in the 500cc class with retirements in the first two rounds. After scoring consistent points, including third-place finishes at the Spanish, French, and Catalan rounds, he took his first victory at Donington Park in July.

More podium places followed in Germany, the Czech Republic, and Portugal. Rossi won the Rio round, but Kenny Roberts Jr. who clinched the 2000 title after finishing in sixth position, which gave him an unassailable lead in the championship. After his second 500cc win, Rossi went on to finish second in the Pacific race and third in the Australian races. He finished second in his rookie season in the 500cc class with 209 points.

===== 2001 =====
Rossi dominated his second season in the 500cc class, scoring 11 wins and only finishing off the podium three times. Three consecutive race wins in Japan, South Africa, and Spain were followed by wins at Catalunya, Britain, the Czech Republic, and Portugal. He had a disappointing result in the Valencian Community round where he finished in 11th place, but then scored a string of race wins from the Pacific to the Rio rounds.

Rossi won his first 500cc title with 325 points and third title overall, 106 points ahead of Biaggi, who had been Rossi's main rival during the season.

=== MotoGP World Championship ===
==== Honda (2002–2003) ====
===== 2002 =====
Many riders experienced problems getting used to the new MotoGP bikes. Rossi started the year off strong and won the first race in wet conditions in Japan. He also took the pole position in the first five races. He scored victories from the Spanish to the German rounds. His only retirement of the season was from the Czech Republic round. He then had back-to-back wins in Portugal and Rio, two second-place finishes in the Pacific and Malaysia, another victory in Australia and a second-place finish in the final race in the Valencian Community.

Rossi went on to win eight of the first nine races of the season, eventually claiming 11 victories in total. He clinched his second title in the Rio de Janeiro race, his first in the inaugural class, and fourth title overall with four races remaining.

===== 2003 =====
After a strong 2002, Rossi continued to dominate in 2003 despite competition from emerging Spaniard Sete Gibernau. Rossi took pole and won the first round of the season in Japan, but the race was marred by the death of Japanese rider Daijiro Kato. Rossi finished second in the South African round before winning again in Spain. He won in Italy and came second again in Catalunya. He took two third-place finishes in the Dutch and British rounds, and another second place in Germany, losing to Gibernau by 0.060 seconds.

After Germany, Rossi won three more races in the Czech Republic, Portugal, and Rio de Janeiro. Rossi ended his season by scoring three consecutive poles and race wins in the Malaysian, Australian, and Valencian Community rounds. The Australian victory is considered by many to be one of Rossi's greatest career moments: despite being given a ten-second penalty, he was able to pull away from the rest of the field, finishing more than fifteen seconds and winning the race.

Rossi won the 2003 title in Malaysia, his third in the top class and fifth title overall, with two races remaining. He won the final race in the Valencian Community round, his final win for Honda.

Rossi parted ways with Honda at the end of the season. Mid-season rumours pointed towards a possible move to Ducati, but Rossi passed the offer up, partly because of Ducati's uncompetitiveness and partly because he didn't like their mindset. Ultimately, Rossi signed a two-year contract with rivals Yamaha reportedly worth in excess of US$12 million; a price no other manufacturer, even Honda, was willing to pay.

==== Yamaha (2004–2010) ====
===== 2004 =====
Rossi made the switch from Honda to Yamaha and signed a two-year contract with the team. Rossi took pole and won the South African race after a hard-fought battle with Max Biaggi, becoming the first rider to win consecutive races with different manufacturers. A 23-race podium streak ended with fourth places in Spain. and France, but Rossi responded with three consecutive victories in Italy, Catalunya, and the Netherlands.

Rossi retired in Rio de Janeiro and finished fourth in Germany but bounced back by winning the British round from pole. He then went on to finish second in the Czech Republic, first in Portugal, and second once again in Japan.

After a second DNF of the season in Qatar, Rossi won in the Malaysian, the Australian, and the Valencian Community rounds. Rossi finished first with 304 points to Gibernau's 257, with Max Biaggi third with 217 points. He clinched his third MotoGP, fourth top class and sixth overall championship in the penultimate race of the season.

===== 2005 =====
In 2005, Rossi and the Factory Yamaha team became even more dominant than the year before. Rossi won the first round in Spain in a controversial manner, colliding with the Gresini Honda of Sete Gibernau on the last lap. He scored a second-place finish in Portugal but then went on to take five consecutive victories from the Chinese to the Dutch rounds, including three pole positions in France, Italy, and Assen.

In the first United States round since 1994, Rossi struggled and finished in third place whilst American rider Nicky Hayden won the race. Rossi bounced back by picking up three more wins, starting from a pole-victory in a rainy Great Britain and two regular victories in Germany, holding off Gibernau on the last lap, and the Czech Republic.

Rossi crashed out of the Japanese round when he collided with Marco Melandri during an overtaking attempt. This was the only time he failed to podium that season. After Motegi, Rossi scored a podium in the form of second place in Malaysia and back-to-back wins in Qatar and Australia, beating Nicky Hayden for the victory. He finished the season with a second and third-place finish in the inaugural Turkish and the Valencian Community rounds.

Rossi finished the season in first place with a total of eleven wins and 367 points, 147 points ahead of second-place finisher Marco Melandri and captured his fourth MotoGP, fifth top class and seventh overall championship in Sepang with four races remaining.

===== 2006 =====
The 2006 season started off with Rossi once again the favourite. In the first round in Spain, a collision with Toni Elías caused Rossi to finish 14th. In the second race in Qatar, he scored his first win of the season, but then finished fourth in Turkey. Two consecutive retirements in China and France left Rossi eighth in the standings with a 43-points deficit to Nicky Hayden. He bounced back by scoring two wins in Italy and Catalunya, but he only managed eight in the Dutch round.

Rossi took second place in Great Britain and another win in Germany, but retired once more in the United States. Consistent podiums from the Czech Republic to Japan saw the points lead of Hayden reduced from 51 points to 12 points in Motegi, as Rossi moved from fourth to second in the championship standings.

In the penultimate round in Portugal, Hayden was forced to retire, but Rossi lost victory to Toni Elías in the final corner. In the final race of the season, the Valencian Community round, Rossi led by eight points and needed to finish in second place or higher to win the title. However, he only managed to finish 13th, ending the season on 247 points and losing the title to Nicky Hayden by just five points. After the race, Rossi called his fall "a disaster" but congratulated Nicky on his title.

===== 2007 =====
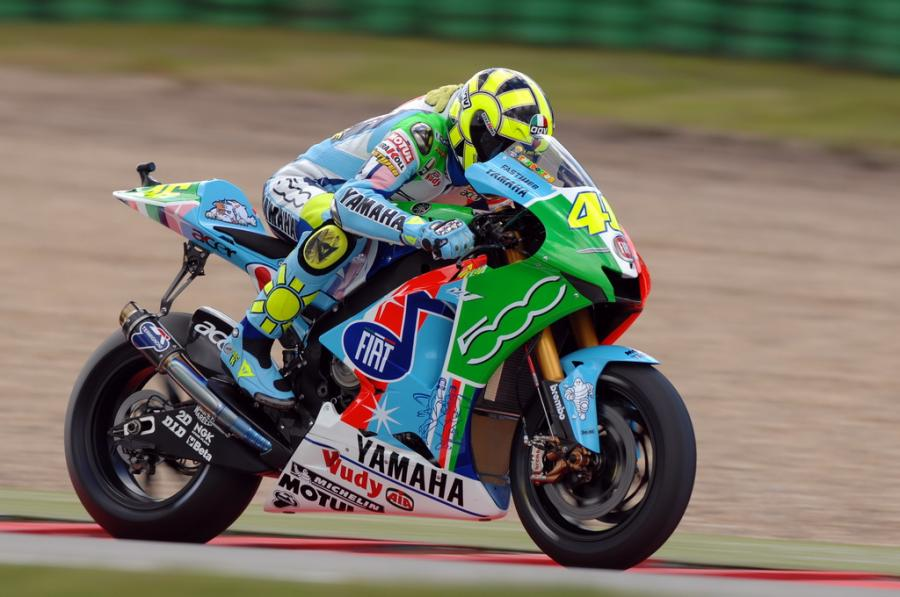
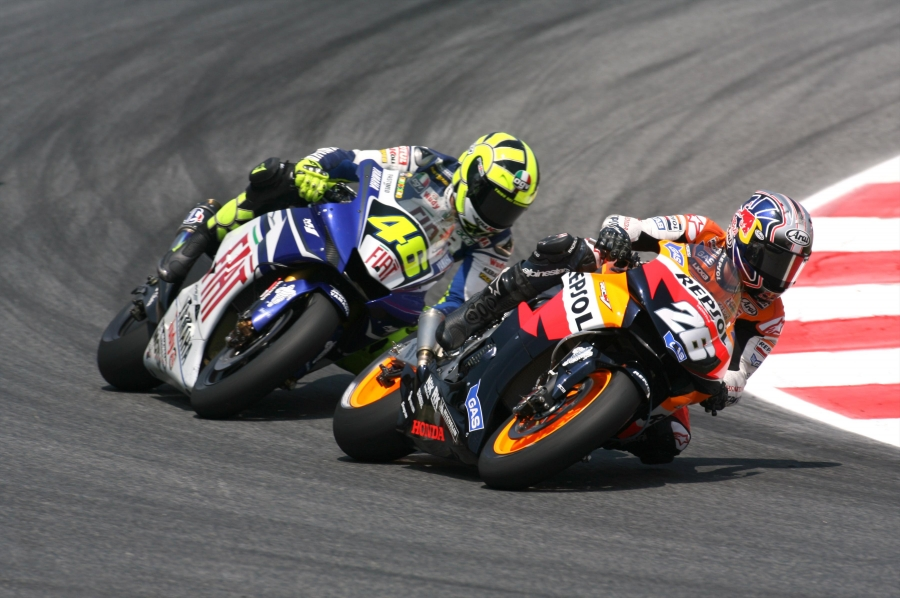
Rossi in the 2007 Dutch TT with a special bike livery and Valentino Rossi closely following Dani Pedrosa at the 2007 Catalan Grand Prix.

After Rossi lost the title in 2006, he was still nonetheless one of the favourites to win the 2007 championship. He finished second in Qatar and won in Spain. before losing ground on standings leader Casey Stoner with a tenth-place finish in Turkey. Rossi finished second to Stoner in China and third in a rain-affected French round. A first victory of the season in Italy was followed by another second-place finish in Catalunya, behind Stoner. In Great Britain, Rossi finished fourth while Stoner won, before hunting down Stoner to take victory in the Netherlands.

A retirement in Germany, fourth and seventh-place finishes in the United States and Czech Republic, and another retirement at San Marino, meant Stoner led in the championship by 85 points. In the next round in Portugal, Rossi won his final race of the season after a close fight with the Honda of Dani Pedrosa.

In the Japanese round, Rossi suffered from braking problems, finishing in 13th position. This gave Casey Stoner the 2007 world championship. Rossi went on to take third in Australia and fifth in the Malaysian round. In the last race of the season technical problems caused Rossi to retire. Rossi finished in third place in the championship with 241 points, behind Stoner and Pedrosa, who won the last race.

===== 2008 =====
After two frustrating seasons, critics started to doubt if Rossi was capable of ever winning another title. Some said he should retire, whilst others assumed that Casey Stoner would win his second title or that Dani Pedrosa would become a genuine title contender after his strong performances in 2006 and 2007. In advance of the season, he switched from Michelin to Bridgestone tyres, which Rossi claimed was needed to "boost his motivation".

Rossi started the year with a fifth place in Qatar whilst Stoner won the race. However, Rossi fought back with second in Spain and third in the Portugal. Three consecutive victories followed in China, France, and Italy.

At the Dutch GP, with an 11-point lead over Pedrosa, Rossi could only finish eleventh after a collision, but he retook the lead of the title hunt by finishing second in a rain-affected German round after Pedrosa retired. Rossi then took a multitude of race wins from the United States to Japan. Rossi clinched his fifth MotoGP, sixth top class and eighth overall championship in Japan with three races remaining. On the podium, he wore a shirt with the text "Scusate il ritardo" ("Sorry for the delay") in Italian, emphasising his lack of titles in the last two years.

Three more podiums followed in Australia, Malaysia, and the Valencian Community round. Rossi finished first in the championship with 373 points.

===== 2009 =====
After the unexpected success and title of Rossi in 2008, many expected him to be a strong contender in 2009. Rossi started by taking two consecutive second places in Qatar and Japan. His first victory of the year came in the third round in Spain, taking the championship lead from Stoner, but a fall and sixteenth-place finish at the French GP conceded it to Rossi's teammate Jorge Lorenzo.

A third position finish in Italy, was followed by victories in Catalunya, and at the Dutch round. This victory marked his 100th career win, becoming only the second rider in motorcycle grand prix history – after Giacomo Agostini – to reach 100 wins.

In the United States GP, Rossi finished a close second behind surprise race winner Dani Pedrosa. He then went on to claim victory ahead of Lorenzo in Germany, a fifth-place finish in a rain-affected Great Britain race, and a commanding victory in the Czech Republic round. His only retirement came at Indianapolis, where Lorenzo halved Rossi's title advantage to just 25 points with five rounds to go. Rossi responded with victory at San Marino; Lorenzo again fought back, winning in Portugal and reducing the championship lead from 30 to 18 points, but he retired in Australia with Rossi finishing second.

In the penultimate round in Malaysia, Rossi secured third place in front of Lorenzo in fourth, giving him an unassailable lead of 45 points and clinching his sixth MotoGP, seventh top class and ninth overall title. The final race of the season, the Valencian Community, resulted in a final second place podium of the year for Rossi, behind Pedrosa.

===== 2010 =====
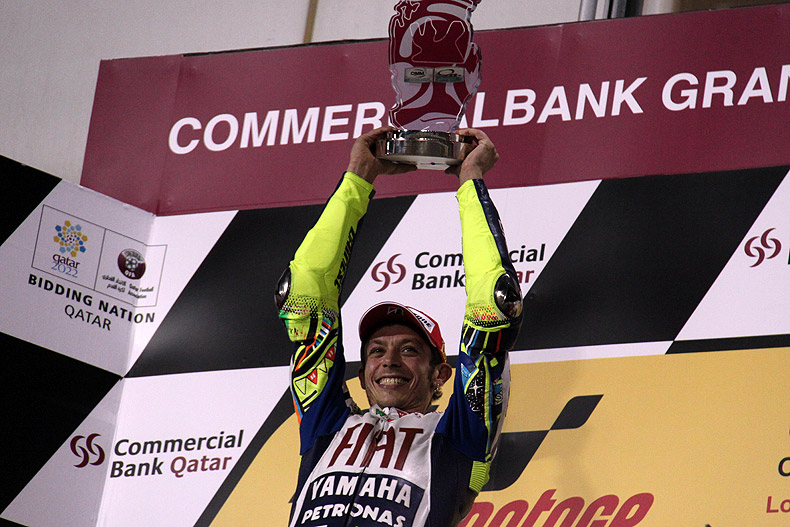
Rossi celebrates victory in the 2010 Qatar Grand Prix

With two consecutive titles won, Rossi was once again the favourite to win the championship going into the 2010 season. Rossi won the first race of the season in Qatar, took third place in Spain, and second place in France.

In round four in Italy, at the fast Biondetti corner in second free practice at around 120 mph (190 km/h), Rossi crashed, suffering a displaced compound fracture of his right tibia. This crushed any hopes of him winning the 2010 title, as it became clear that he was out of contention for the next two or three months. He was absent for the Italian, British, Dutch, and Catalan rounds.

Rossi planned to make his comeback at the Czech Republic in August. On 7 July, Rossi rode in Misano to test his leg's recovery, but complained of discomfort, reporting pain in both his leg and his shoulder. On 12 July, Rossi took part in another test in Brno, which was more positive. After an observation by the Chief Medical Officer on the Thursday before the German GP weekend and missing four rounds, Rossi returned in Germany and remarkably finished just off the podium in fourth position. He returned two rounds earlier than predicted, and only 41 days after his accident. In round 9 of the season, held in the United States, Rossi took his first podium since his broken leg, but only managed fifth and fourth in the next two rounds.

More third places came in San Marino and Japan. In Malaysia, Rossi took a stunning victory by winning the race, coming back from eleventh position. Nevertheless, Lorenzo won the title by finishing in third place.

After his win, Rossi continued to impress with podiums in Australia, Portugal, and the Valencian Community round. He finished third in the championship with 233 points, 150 points behind champion Jorge Lorenzo and 12 points behind runner-up Dani Pedrosa. Rossi collected ten podiums throughout the season, including five consecutive podiums in the season's final run.

==== Ducati (2011–2012) ====
===== 2011 =====
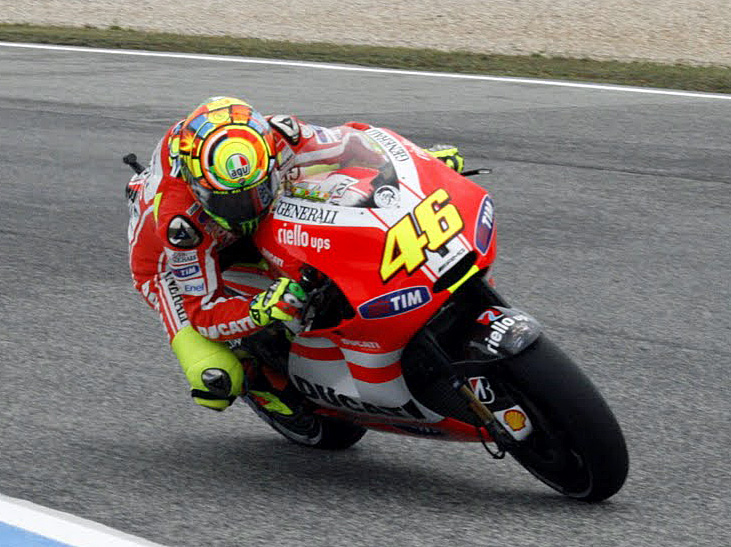
Rossi in the 2011 Portuguese Grand Prix

On 15 August 2010, after the Brno race, Rossi confirmed he was going to ride for the Ducati factory team, signing a two-year deal starting in 2011 and joining former teammate Nicky Hayden. He tested the Ducati Desmosedici for the first time in Valencia on 9 November 2010, making this his first appearance since 1999 on an Italian motorcycle.

There was much anticipation for the first race of the season, but Rossi started the season on a disappointing note, only finishing seventh in Qatar. A collision with Casey Stoner in Spain, caused Stoner to retire and Rossi to finish fifth. Another fifth place followed in Portugal. Rossi's best result of the year came in France, where he took his first and only podium of the season. Rossi then finished the next four races inside the top six; fifth in Catalunya, sixth in Great Britain, fourth in the Dutch round, and sixth again in Italy.

Poor results continued: ninth in Germany, sixth in the United States and the Czech Republic, tenth at Indianapolis, and seventh and tenth in San Marino and Aragón. Three consecutive retirements followed in Japan, Australia, and the Valencian Community race. (The preceding Malaysian round was abandoned after Marco Simoncelli suffered fatal injuries in a collision with Rossi and Colin Edwards on the second lap.)

Rossi finished seventh in the championship with 139 points, 211 points behind champion Casey Stoner. He also finished a season winless for the first time in his Grand Prix career.

===== 2012 =====
Rossi's 2012 season also started poorly, with tenth in Qatar, and ninth and seventh at Spain and Portugal. One of his best results of the year came in the wet French round, where he finished second.

Over the next couple of races, the Ducati continued to perform poorly, allowing Rossi to score points only. He finished seventh in Catalunya while and ninth in Great Britain. After a thirteenth-place finish in the Dutch round, Rossi finished sixth in Germany, his best dry result of the season so far. In Italy, he improved upon his German result and finished fifth, but did not finish at the United States GP. Rossi finished seventh in the Indianapolis and Czech Republic rounds, before equalling his best result by finishing second in San Marino. Rossi ended his final year with Ducati with lackluster performances: eighth in Aragón, seventh in Japan, fifth in Malaysia, seventh again in Australia, and tenth in the Valencian Community round.

Rossi finished sixth in the championship with 163 points, 187 points behind champion Jorge Lorenzo.

==== Return to Yamaha (2013–2020) ====
===== 2013 =====
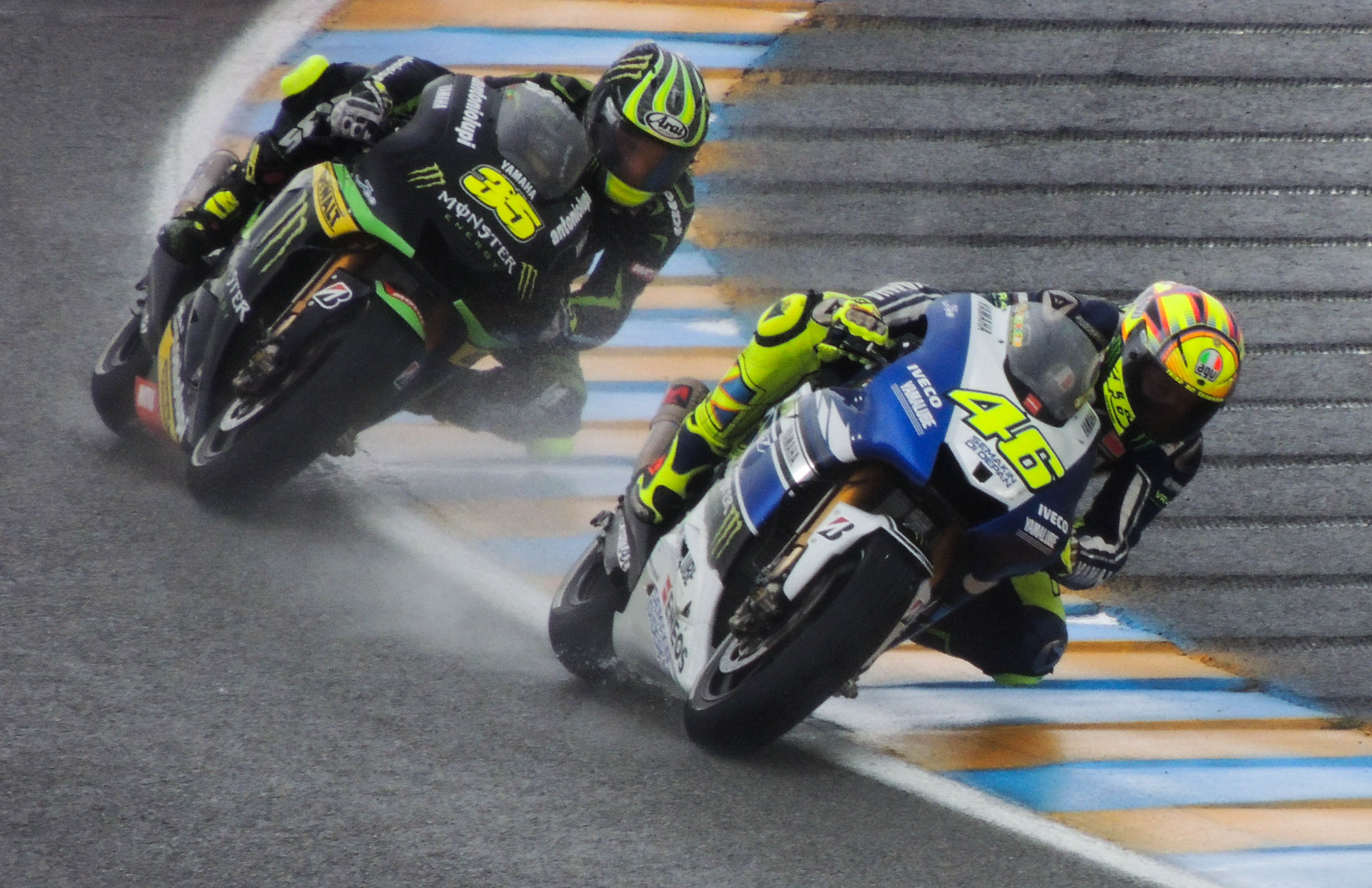
Rossi with Cal Crutchlow in the 2013 French Grand Prix, where he finished 12th

On 10 August, it was confirmed that Rossi would rejoin the Yamaha factory team until the end of the 2014 season, resuming his partnership with Jorge Lorenzo. He kicked off the season well in the opening round in Qatar, fighting back from seventh and overtaking rookie Marc Márquez for second place. In the next two races in the Americas and Spain, Rossi finished in sixth and fourth position. In the French round, he finished a disappointing twelfth. In round five, the Italian Grand Prix, Rossi registered his only retirement of the year after a first-lap collision with Álvaro Bautista; he came fourth in the following race at Catalunya.

On 29 June 2013 in the Dutch round, Rossi recorded his first MotoGP win since Malaysia in 2010 – a 46-race winless streak. He continued to score good results with third places in Germany and the United States. After four consecutive fourth places, Rossi claimed third place at Aragón, and two races later in the Australian round. In the last two rounds in Japan and in the Valencian Community, he finished sixth and fourth respectively. Rossi finished fourth in the championship with 237 points – his best result since 2010 – 97 points behind champion Marc Márquez.

===== 2014 =====
Hopes for 2014 were high. Rossi started the season well with a second-place finish in Qatar, losing to Márquez by 0.259 seconds. In the next two races, Rossi finished eighth and fourth. Better results came in Spain and France, with Rossi finishing second to Márquez both times. On 1 June 2014, Rossi appeared in his 300th Grand Prix race in the Italian round, where he finished in third. Another second place to Márquez came in the Catalan GP. Lackluster performances followed in the Dutch and German rounds – fifth and fourth – until a string of third places followed in the Indianapolis, Czech, and British races.

In his "home race" in San Marino, Rossi won his first race since the 2013 Dutch TT round. The victory pushed him past 5000 total career points, making him the first, and so far only, rider to achieve this. The following round in Aragón, Rossi crashed heavily, losing consciousness briefly and having a CT scan as a precaution. In Australia, Rossi took his second victory of the year, benefitting from an accident of Márquez who had been leading the race, but again came second to his rival in Malaysia. Rossi took his first pole position since the 2010 French Grand Prix in the Valencian Community race, his 60th pole position in Grand Prix racing. He finished in second place behind Márquez in the race.

Rossi secured second place in the championship with 295 points, trailing champion Marc Márquez by 67 points.

===== 2015 =====
Rossi started the 2015 season – his 20th in World Championship level – by taking victory in the opening race in Qatar. After a third-place finish in the Americas came his second victory of the season in Argentina. Rossi continued his streak of podium finishes with the 200th of his career in Spain, in France, in Italy, and in Catalunya.

Rossi took his first pole position of the season in the Dutch race and achieved his third victory of the season after colliding with Márquez on the final corner on the last lap. He took his championship lead to ten points over Lorenzo, before Rossi further extending it with third in Germany, Indianapolis, and the Czech Republic. Lorenzo's win in Brno gave him the championship lead over Rossi, who regained it with victory in Great Britain. The podium streak of 16 races ended with a fifth-place finish in San Marino, but Rossi extended his championship lead to 23 points after Lorenzo crashed out. Lorenzo won the Aragón round with Rossi finishing in third to cut the gap to fourteen points with four races remaining. The pair's results were enough for the Movistar Yamaha MotoGP team to clinch their title, their first since 2010.

Rossi extended his lead with second place in Japan, but Lorenzo fought back in Australia and in Malaysia. Lorenzo further cut the lead to seven points after a second-place finish in Malaysia; Rossi finished third after a controversial collision with Márquez, in which he accrued three penalty points – enough to enforce a start from the back of the grid for the final race in the Valencian Community. Rossi accused Márquez of deliberately trying to harm his championship, something Márquez repeatedly denied. Rossi made it up to fourth in the race but with Lorenzo won it and took the championship by only five points.

===== 2016 =====
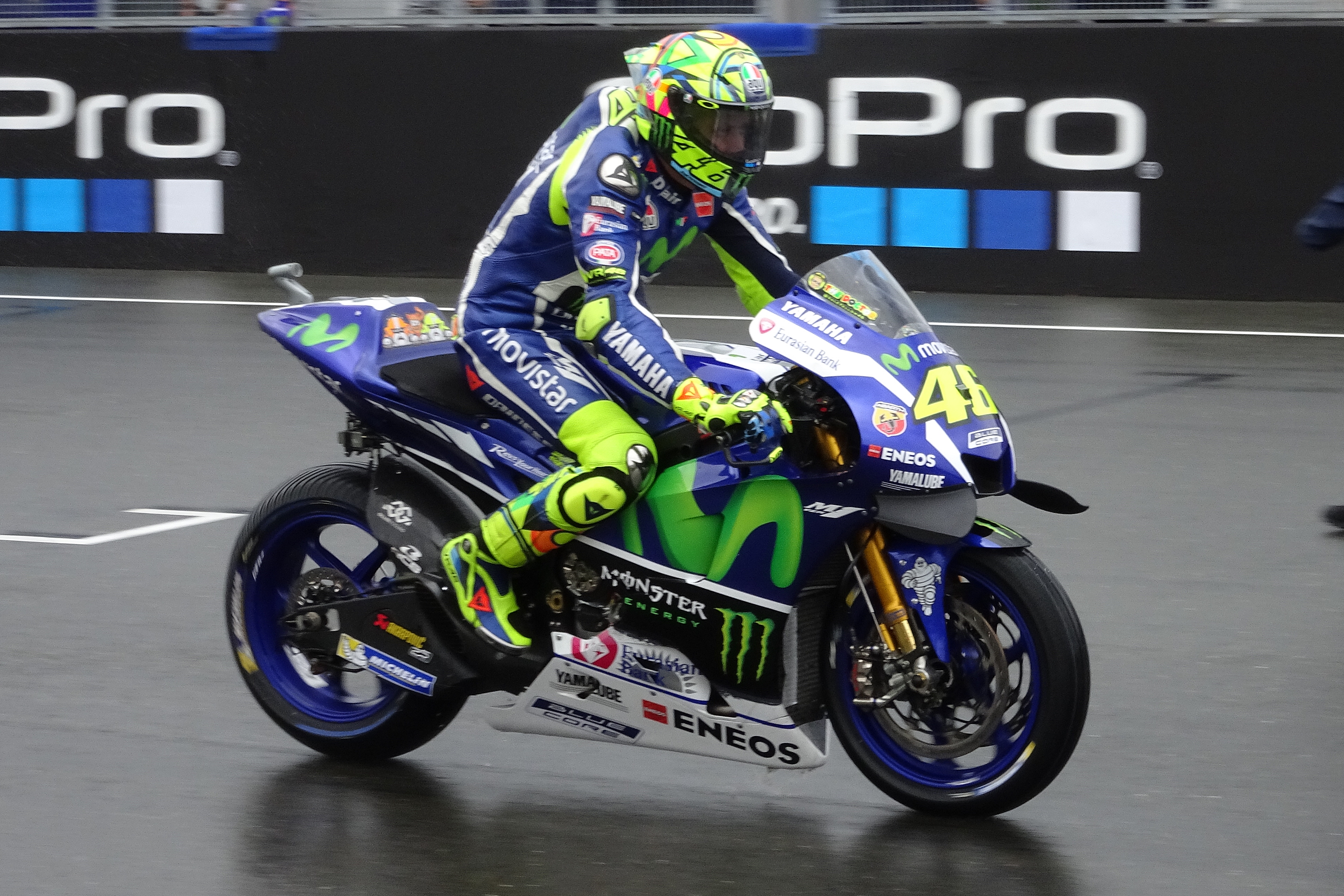
Rossi at Sachsenring 2016

Before the 2016 season began, Rossi announced that he will continue his career with the Factory Yamaha team until 2018. Yamaha announced that Rossi would ride a 2016 YZR-M1 with ECU Michelin tyres.

Rossi began the 2016 season with fourth place in Qatar. In the next race in Argentina, Rossi returned to the podium with a second place behind Marc Márquez. In the third round in the Americas, Rossi suffered his first DNF since the 2014 Aragon Grand Prix, after crashing on the third lap. In Spain, Rossi took pole position on Saturday, then led the race from start-to-finish with the exception of one corner to win. The race marked the first time in his MotoGP career that Rossi led every lap of a race from pole position. In the French round, Rossi recovered to finish second. Rossi suffered an engine failure on his home race in Italy, but bounced back by winning in Catalunya. Rossi crashed in both races at a wet Dutch GP, before an eighth-place finish in variable conditions in Germany.

Another wet race in the Czech Republic saw finish second to Cal Crutchlow, and Rossi would reach the podium again in Great Britain, San Marino, and Aragón. However, a crash at Japan handed the championship to Márquez with three races remaining. Two more second places followed in Australia and in Malaysia, securing second place in the championship for the third consecutive year.

===== 2017 =====
Rossi suffered a difficult winter testing period for the 2017 season, often lagging behind new teammate Maverick Viñales. He however opened with consecutive podiums in Qatar, Argentina, and the Americas, to take the lead of the championship by six points. The European season began disappointingly a lowly tenth-place finish in Spain and a DNF in France, where he lost the championship lead. Following the French round, Rossi suffered a motocross training crash but was not seriously injured. Although he was deemed fit to race at Mugello, he blamed his fourth-place finish on his lack of energy due to the crash. A week later in Catalunya, Rossi and Viñales were only able to finish eighth and tenth.

Rossi took his first and only win of the season in the Dutch round from Danilo Petrucci by just 0.063 seconds. The result also made Rossi the oldest race winner in the MotoGP era, surpassing Troy Bayliss. Rossi underperformed in the next three rounds in Germany, the Czech Republic and Austria, finishing in fifth, fourth and seventh positions, before claiming third in Great Britain. After the race in Silverstone, Rossi suffered another motocross crash, fracturing the tibia and fibula of his right leg; they required surgery and he missed his the race in San Marino.

He returned in Aragón to finish fifth, before retiring in Japan in the wet, and taking second at the Australian GP. Rossi eventually finished fifth in the championship with 208 points, 90 points behind champion Marc Márquez.

===== 2018 =====
Before the start of the season-opening race in Qatar, Rossi announced he had extended his contract in the Factory Yamaha team until 2020. During the pre-season tests, Rossi and Viñales once again struggled with their 2018 YZR-M1 competitor. Both riders were concerned about corner-entry and corner-exit issues as well as the lack of traction and tyre temperature.

In the first round in Qatar, Rossi started off well with third place, but in Argentina, he finished 19th after an incident with Márquez. Márquez received a 30-second penalty for the action. In the following rounds in the Americas and Spain, Rossi finished off the podium twice in fourth and fifth place, but he bounced back by scoring three consecutive third-place podiums in the French, Italian, and Catalan rounds. In Mugello, he scored his first and only pole position of the season.

Rossi only finished fifth in the Dutch round but came second in Germany. After his podium finish in the Sachsenring, Rossi finished in fourth and sixth place in the Czech Republic and Austria races. He finished the San Marino race in seventh, the Aragón race in eighth, the Thai and Japanese races in fourth place, and the Australian race in sixth. In the penultimate round in Malaysia, Rossi was about to challenge Márquez for victory with four laps to go when he lost control, finishing nineteenth. He again crashed out of second place in the Valencian Community round. Rossi finished third in the championship with 198 points, Rossi's first winless season since 2012 when he raced with Ducati and his first ever winless season with the Factory Yamaha team.

===== 2019 =====
During the pre-season tests, both Yamaha riders had mixed feelings of the 2019 YZR-M1. In the opening round in Qatar, Rossi came from fourteenth on the grid to finish fifth in the line; he followed this up with consecutive second places in Argentina and in the Americas. After the good results, Rossi only managed to finish in sixth and fifth place in Spain and France, and then he registed three consecutive retirements – for the first time in his career – in Italy, Catalunya, and in the Netherlands.

At the German and Czech rounds, Rossi managed to score an eighth and sixth place. He then scored three consecutive fourth places in Austria, Great Britain, and his home race in San Marino. Two eighth-place finishes followed in Aragón and Thailand, before another retirement followed in Japan. Rossi ended the season with eighth place in Australia, fourth place in Malaysia, and eighth again in Valencia. Rossi finished seventh in the championship.

===== 2020 =====
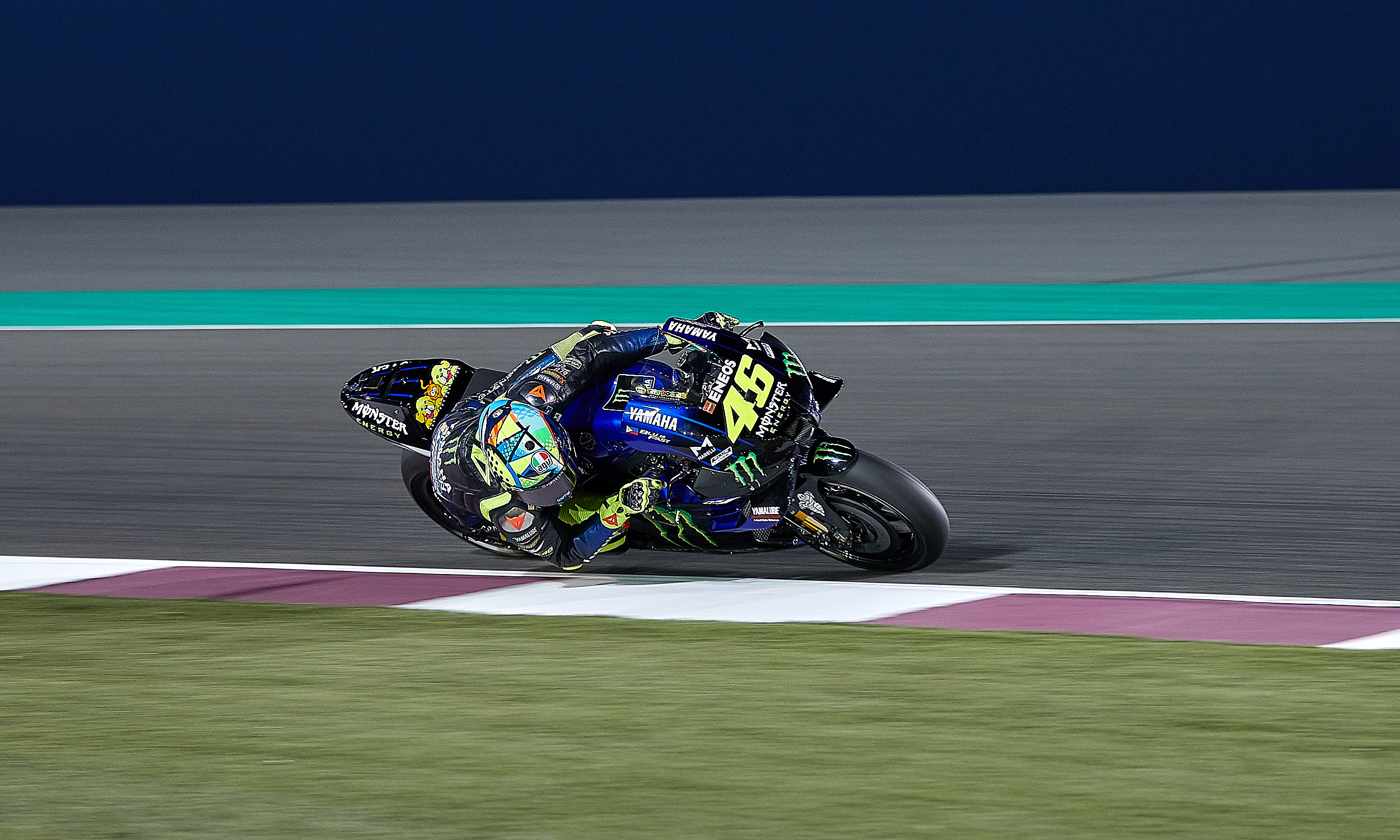
Rossi in the MotoGP winter tests 2020 in Qatar

Rossi's post-2020 future in the factory Yamaha team was uncertain after the rather poor results he had obtained the previous year. His initial plan was to wait for a handful of races in 2020 to see his competitiveness, but he was unable to do so because of the outbreak of the COVID-19 pandemic and subsequent delay of the start of the season. During the delay team chose Fabio Quartararo to line up beside Viñales for the 2021 season.

In the pre-season tests, the 2020 YZR-M1 had improved considerably compared to the 2019 counterpart. Rossi retired in the first race of the restarted season in Spain with technical problems. In the same venue one week later, Rossi came home third to pick up his 199th podium in his motorcycle racing career. Two fifth places followed in the Czech Republic and Austria. Following a fourth place in the first race in his home Grand Prix in Misano, Rossi had three consecutive retirements in the second race in Misano, Le Mans, and in Barcelona.

On 15 October 2020, he tested positive for COVID-19, which forced him to miss the Aragon and Teruel GP's. Having recovered from COVID-19, Rossi raced in the European GP but retired. On 12 November, Rossi tested positive for COVID-19 for a second time. However, further tests confirmed that the previous test was a false positive and he was allowed to participate in the final two races of the season.

==== Petronas Yamaha SRT (2021) ====
In September 2020, after six months of speculation, Rossi confirmed that he would be joining Petronas Yamaha SRT for the 2021 season alongside his VR46 Academy protege Franco Morbidelli. Rossi finished twelfth and sixteenth in the first and second races of the season in Qatar and Doha Grand Prix.

On 5 August 2021, during the pre-event press conference of the Styria weekend, Rossi announced that he would retire from MotoGP after the 2021 season. His last race was the 2021 Valencian Grand Prix, and he was congratulated for a successful career by prominent racing figures such as Lewis Hamilton and Max Verstappen, as well as former rival Casey Stoner. Rossi's number 46 was retired with a ceremony in the 2022 Italian motorcycle Grand Prix. Rossi managed to finish tenth at his final Italian GP race at the Mugello MotoGP circuit with a 10th-place finish. Eighth place at the Austria round turned out to be Rossi's best finish of the season. On 14 November 2021, Valentino Rossi ended his MotoGP racing career at the Valencian Grand Prix in Circuit Ricardo Tormo.

=== Sportscar racing ===
==== GT World Challenge Europe Endurance & Sprint ====
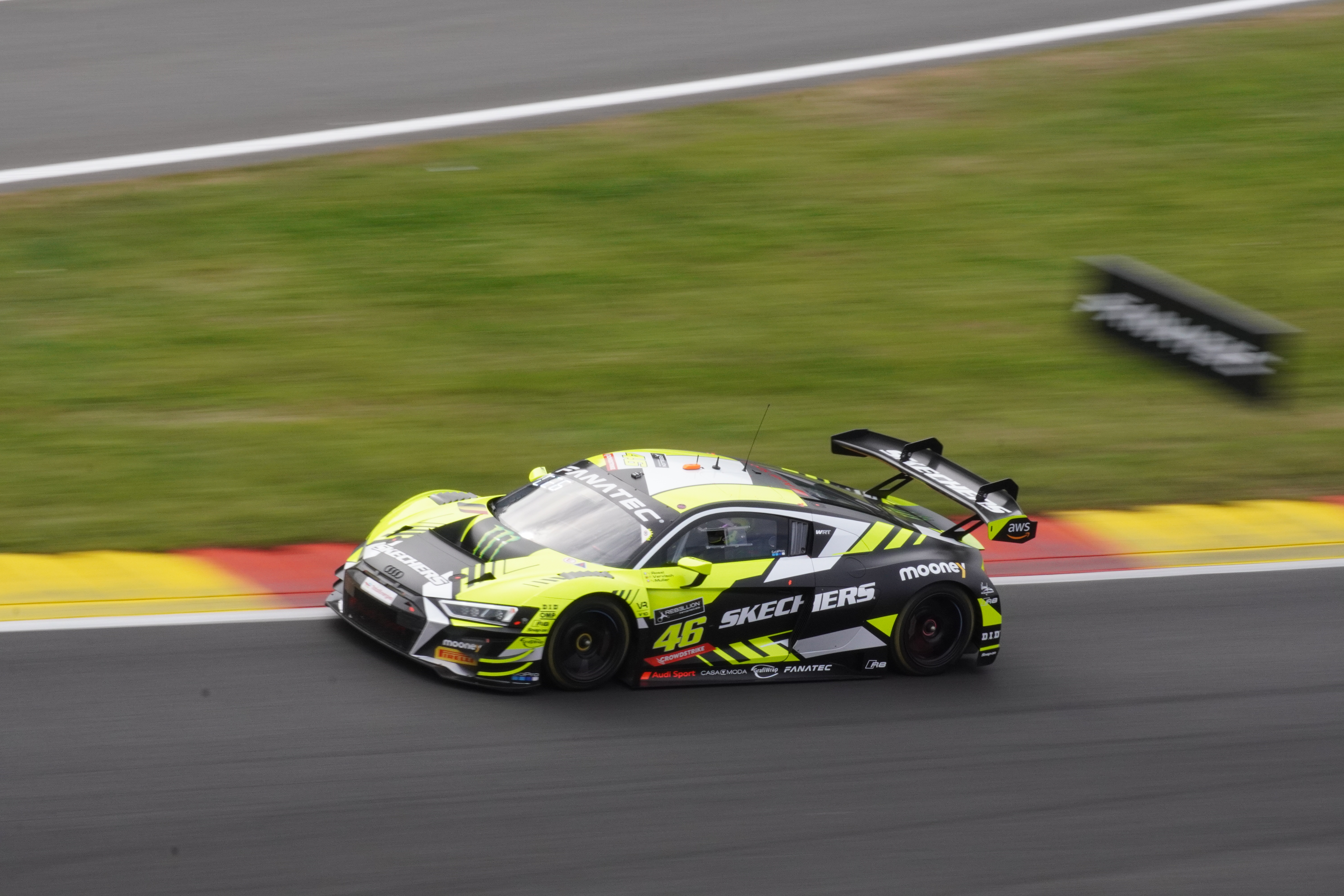
The Team WRT #46 Audi R8 LMS Evo II driven by Rossi, Frédéric Vervisch and Nico Müller in the 2022 24 Hours of Spa

On 13 January 2022, it was announced that Rossi would be racing for Team WRT in the GT World Challenge Europe Endurance Cup in 2022, driving an Audi R8 LMS. He was paired with Audi factory drivers Nico Müller and Frédéric Vervisch. Rossi ended the season 21st in the standings, and 16th in the standings in both the Endurance and Sprint Cups.

Rossi continued with Team WRT for 2023, this time driving a BMW M4 GT3 as opposed to an Audi R8 LMS due to WRT becoming a BMW factory team. For that year, Rossi was paired with BMW factory drivers Maxime Martin and Augusto Farfus. Rossi won his first race in the GT World Challenge in Misano. He finished sixth in the standings.

Rossi competed in the 2023 Road to Le Mans with Team WRT, alongside Jérôme Policand, in preparation for a planned debut in the 2024 24 Hours of Le Mans. Rossi and Policand scored a class victory in the second race, having been promoted to the position after the AF Corse Ferrari 488 GTE of Kei Cozzolino and Hiroshi Koizumi was penalized for "erratic driving".

Rossi continued with Team WRT for 2024, with Farfus replaced with new BMW factory driver Raffaele Marciello for the endurance rounds. Rossi claimed his second win in the series, repeating his win in Misano the previous year.

Rossi continued racing in 2025 with Ahmad Al Harthy and Kelvin van der Linde in the FIA World Endurance Championship (WEC) and Raffaele Marciello and Charles Weerts in the Intercontinental GT Challenge with Team WRT, specifically in the LMGT3 class. They achieved a podium finish in the Bathurst 12 Hour race, securing second place in the Pro category. The podium finish marked a positive start to Rossi's 2025 season and his third attempt at Bathurst.

In 2025, Rossi also competed in the GT World Challenge Europe Endurance Cup, in the same team as Kevin Magnussen and Rene Rast. In the 2025 GT World Challenge Europe Sprint Cup race held at the Misano Circuit in July, Rossi and Raffaele Marciello won race 1.

Rossi returned to GT World Challenge Europe full-time for 2026, this time partnered with Dan Harper and Max Hesse.

==== 24H GT Series ====
Rossi competed in the 24H Series race. In 2023, he teamed up with Sean Gelael, Maxime Martin, Max Hesse, and Tom Whale on Team WRT for the 2022–23 Middle East Trophy. The five of them drove the BMW M4 GT3, according to the class they participated in, namely the GT3. The GT3 class is attended by 20 cars which is the most from all classes. In the first race in Dubai, Rossi and his co-drivers achieved a third-place finish.

==== World Endurance Championship ====
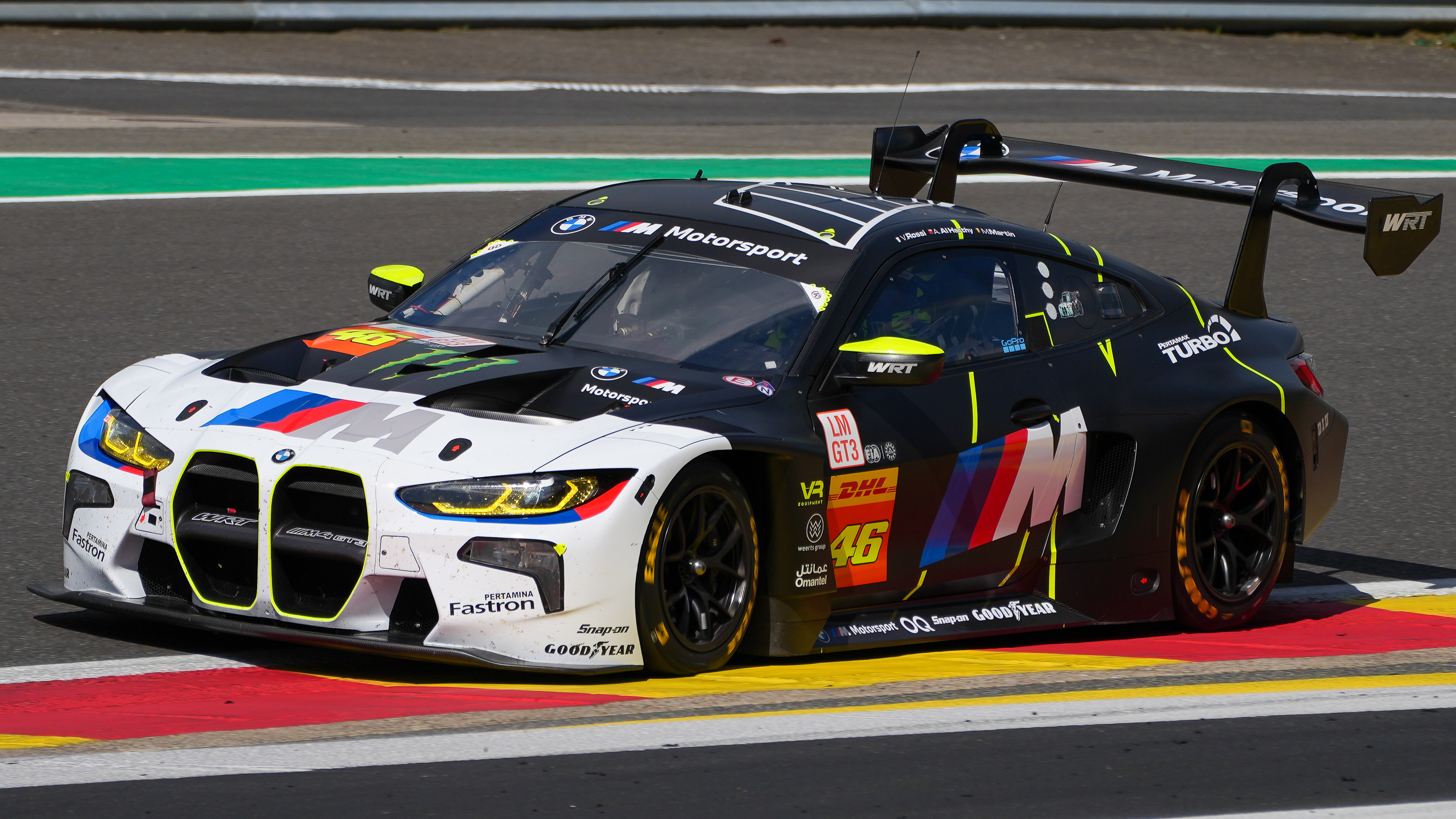
The Team WRT#46 BMW M4 GT3 driven by Rossi, Maxime Martin and Ahmad Al Harthy in the 2024 FIA World Endurance Championship

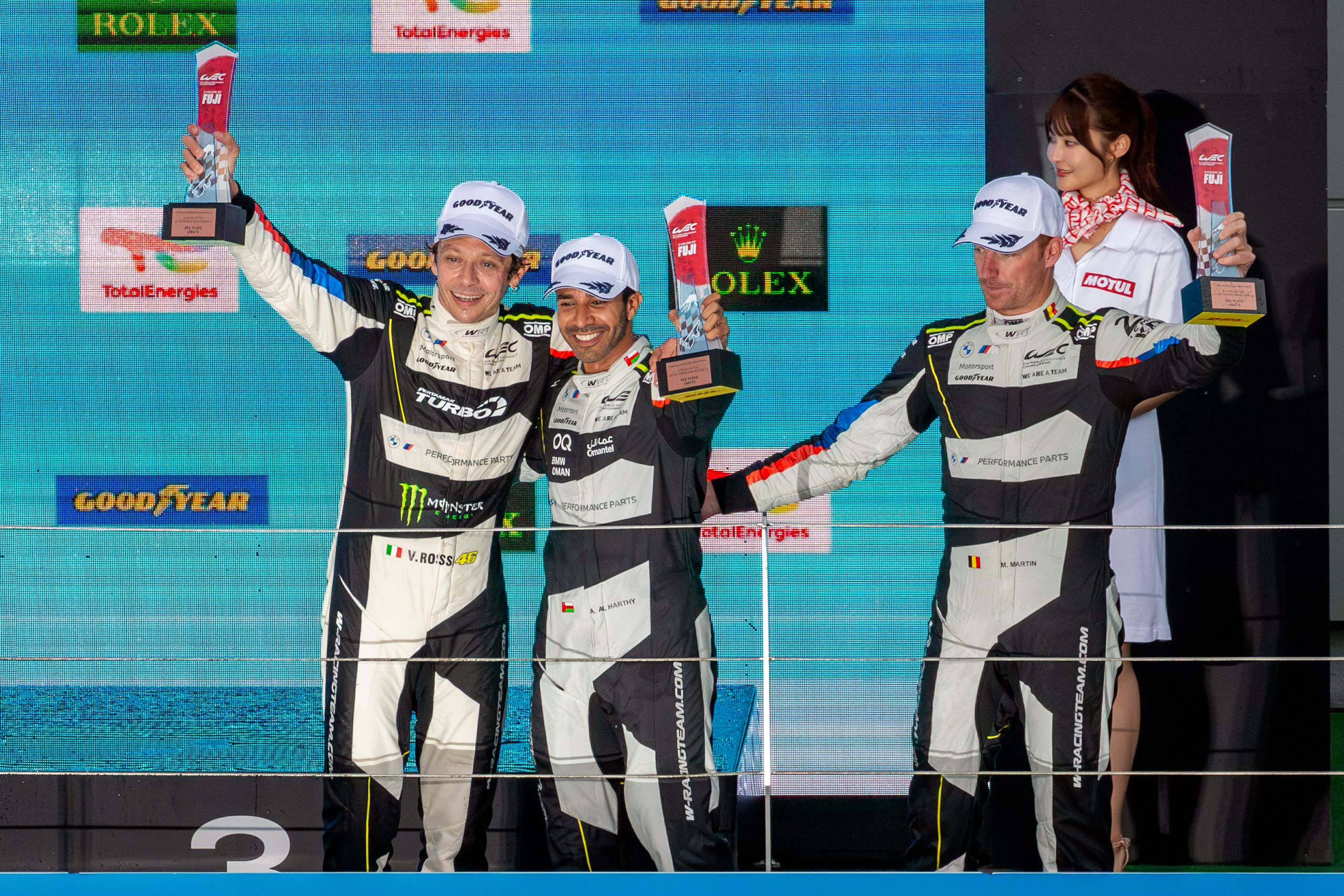
Rossi celebrates podium in the Fuji WEC 2024 with his teammate.

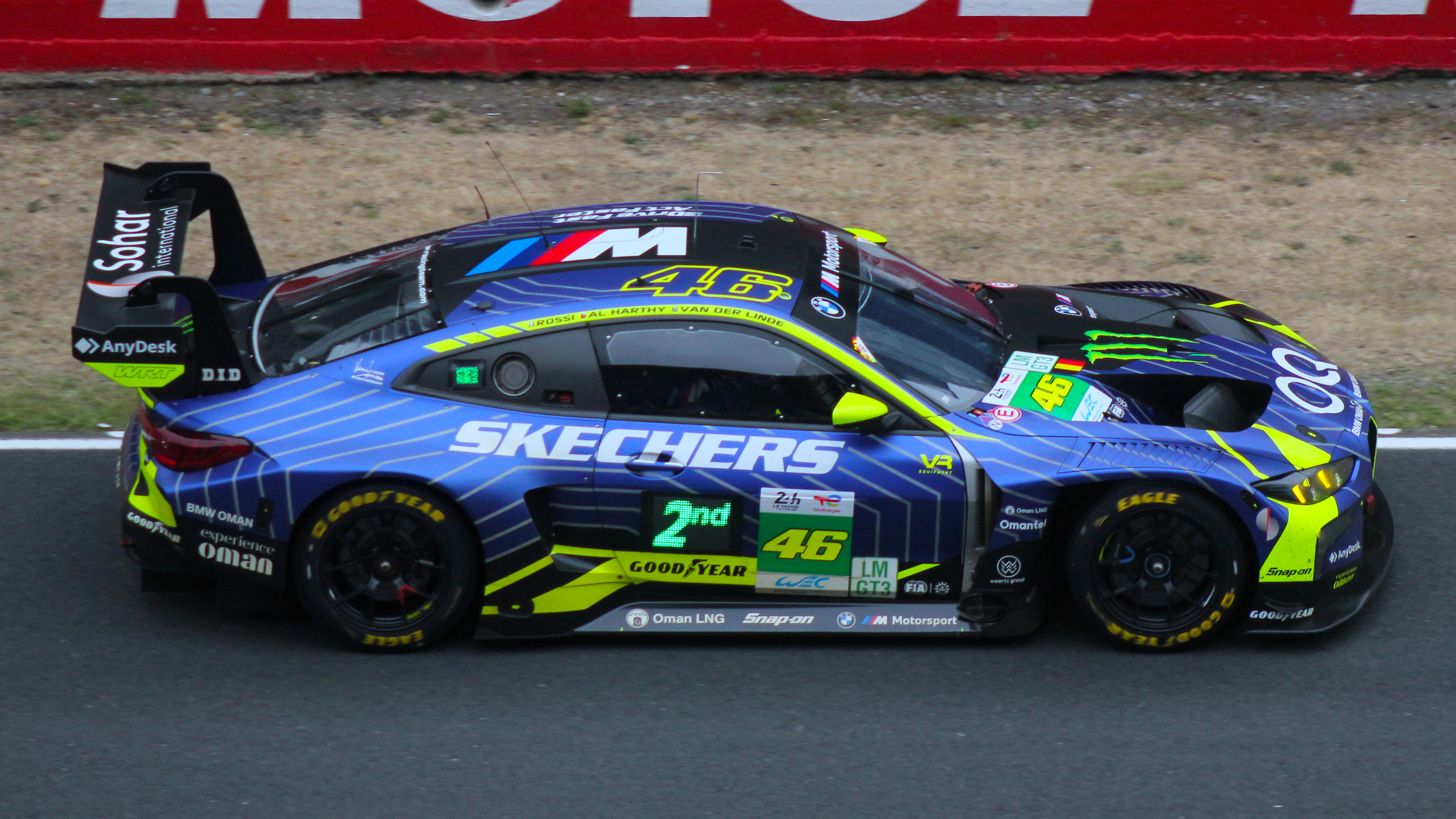
Rossi's No. 46 car at the 2025 24 Hours of Le Mans

In addition to his GT World Challenge Europe commitments, Rossi was signed to compete in the World Endurance Championship in 2024, paired with Maxime Martin and Ahmad Al Harthy. In his debut race in Qatar, Rossi and his team managed to finish fourth in the LMGT3 class. Rossi scored his maiden podium in his second race, at the 2024 6 Hours of Imola, before retiring in the 6 Hours of Spa-Francorchamps and at Le Mans. After a fifth-place finish at Interlagos, and a retirement at the Circuit of the Americas (COTA), Rossi's car claimed a podium at the 6 Hours of Fuji.

Rossi returned to compete in the 2025 LMGT3 car racing championship in the LMGT3 class with the BMW WRT team. He was again paired with Ahmad Al Harthy, alongside double Nurburgring 24 Hours winner Kelvin van der Linde. In the first round held in Qatar, Rossi and his two teammates could only finish in 11th position. At the 2025 6 Hours of Imola, Rossi and his two colleagues managed a second-place finish. After a ninth-place finish at the 6 Hours of Spa-Francorchamps, Rossi's team retired at the 2025 24 Hours of Le Mans, finished tenth at the 6 Hours of São Paulo, and finally another podium at COTA. Rossi departed the World Endurance Championship after the 2025 season, citing a desire to cut down on travel and a preference for the style of racing in GT World Challenge Europe.

== Rivalries ==
=== Max Biaggi ===
Before the first race of the 2001 season even started, Rossi and Biaggi had already had a heated argument when Biaggi encountered Rossi at a restaurant in Suzuka and told him to "wash your mouth out before saying my name". At the first round of the season in Japan, one of the most famous episodes in their rivalry took place when Biaggi seemed to have tried to push Rossi into the dirt at high speed and a few laps later Rossi overtook Biaggi and showed, on live television, his middle finger to him. Two months later at the 2001 Catalan round, Rossi and Biaggi came to blows in the moments before the podium ceremony. Neither rider admitted what had happened; Biaggi claimed that red marks and scratches on his face "must have been caused by a mosquito bite". Rossi claimed that the incident happened because Biaggi bumped into his manager as both riders prepared for the podium. Two weeks later at the next Grand Prix in Assen, Honda organized a press conference to put the events of Barcelona behind them. Rossi and Biaggi talked about the event and shook hands in front of the media, which ended the feud.

=== Sete Gibernau ===
Rossi's closest rival in the 2003 and 2004 seasons was Sete Gibernau. Initially, they were quite friendly in the paddock and off, but a souring in their relationship began in the 2004 season and culminated in the "Qatar Incident" that same season, when Rossi's team was penalized for "cleaning" his grid position to aid in traction, and was subsequently forced to start from the back of the grid. A number of teams, including Gibernau's Team Gresini, appealed successfully to race direction for Rossi to be sanctioned. Rossi and his chief engineer, Jeremy Burgess, insisted that they were doing nothing more than what many others had done before. Rossi accused Gibernau of being behind the move to appeal for a sanction, something the Spaniard categorically denied.

The rivalry between Rossi and Gibernau climaxed at the 2005 round in Jerez. On the final lap, Gibernau was in the lead, but Rossi collided with him while trying to overtake. Gibernau ran wide and finished second whilst Rossi won the race. Gibernau was furious and refused to comment on the incident, while the Spanish crowd booed Rossi on the podium. Rossi commented on the incident, stating that his move had been "hard" but also, "motorbike races sometimes are like this." Gibernau retired from Grand Prix racing after an unsuccessful 2006 season. He never won another race after Qatar, prompting some in the Spanish and Italian motorcycle racing media to refer to the "Qatar Curse".

=== Casey Stoner ===
Casey Stoner's and Rossi's rivalry came to a dramatic climax at the 2008 United States GP. An extended battle between the two, involving several near-collisions, ended with Stoner in the gravel whilst outbreaking himself. Stoner picked up his bike to finish second, while Rossi took the win. When Rossi wanted to shake Stoner's hand in the parc fermé, he angrily refused. At the press conference, Stoner claimed that some of Rossi's moves were considered "aggressive" but Rossi called it "just racing". After this, Casey Stoner made the comment "I have lost respect for one of the greatest riders in history." For the comment, Stoner apologised to Rossi at the next race.

After Rossi moved to the Factory Ducati team and Stoner to the Factory Honda team in 2011, tensions once again rose at the 2011 Spanish round when Rossi collided with Stoner, causing him to crash out of the race. After the race, Rossi went to Stoner to apologise for the incident, and Stoner accepted Rossi's handshake. However, Stoner told Rossi, "your ambition outweighs your talent" during the brief exchange. Stoner later apologised for this comment. Tensions arose once more at the 2012 French race where Rossi and Stoner once again came to blows when they battled hard in the wet conditions.

=== Jorge Lorenzo ===
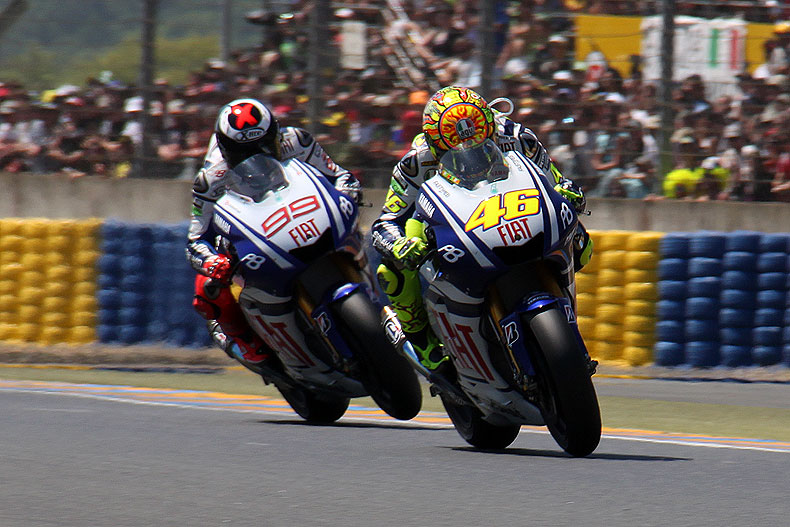
Jorge Lorenzo and Rossi at the 2010 French Grand Prix

In 2010, Jorge Lorenzo finally emerged victorious in the championship battle after Rossi suffered multiple injuries during the season. The most dramatic race of the season came at Motegi, when Lorenzo and Rossi collided with each other on more than one occasion. After Rossi returned to Yamaha in 2013, the rivalry resumed, and came to a boiling point in 2015. Rossi was on course to win his tenth overall title but was narrowly ahead of his teammate Lorenzo, who had closed the gap after the summer break. In Malaysia, Rossi kicked Marc Márquez causing him to fall. This incident led to the race direction imposing three penalty points to Rossi and demoting him to the back of the grid at the final round in Valencia. Lorenzo's victory there, and Rossi's inability to finish high, won the former the championship by five points. Rossi called the title "a Spanish stitch-up" and said "having Marc Márquez as the bodyguard of Lorenzo is embarrassing."

After this, the relationship between Rossi and Lorenzo became sour, though it eased once more when Lorenzo moved to the Factory Ducati team in 2017 whilst Rossi stayed with the team. In the subsequent seasons the rivalry cooled down as Andrea Dovizioso emerged as the main challenger to Marc Márquez. Rossi has won only one race since then and Lorenzo three.

=== Marc Márquez ===
Initially Rossi had a good relationship with Spanish rider Marc Márquez, who said that Rossi had been his childhood idol and that it was a pleasure to battle with him. Their first collision came late in the race in Argentina in 2015: Márquez retired while Rossi won, but both riders shrugged it off as a racing incident. A similar incident occurred at Assen several months later, with Rossi also winning. Post-race Márquez seemed fairly unbothered by the incident, although his team did appeal the result.

The relationship broke down completely after the penultimate round in Malaysia. A week later during the pre-event press conference in Malaysia, Rossi accused Marc of deliberately battling aggressively with him in the previous round in Australia to cost him time and give an advantage to Rossi's teammate and championship rival Jorge Lorenzo. A collision during the race knocked Márquez out; Rossi was penalised by three championship points and by starting from the back of the grid for the championship decider in Valencia. In that race, Lorenzo took victory with Márquez second to claim the title by five points. Márquez was accused of having deliberately defended Lorenzo for the whole race against his own teammate Dani Pedrosa and Rossi called this championship a "Spanish stitch-up".

Tempers flared in 2018, again in Argentina. Márquez collided with Rossi, who retired from the race; Márquez was penalised a further 30 seconds for the incident. After the race, Rossi refused to accept Márquez's apology, and one of his team asked him to leave. Later, Rossi stated that Márquez "destroyed our sport" with his aggressive riding, and that "Marquez needs to get away from me and not look me in the face anymore". At the 2018 San Marino race, Rossi refused to shake Márquez's hand and claimed, "We don't need to shake the hand. We don't have any problem." One year later at the 2019 Argentine GP, Rossi and Márquez once more shook each other's hands just before the podium ceremony.

== Other motorsport activities ==
=== Suzuka 8 Hours ===
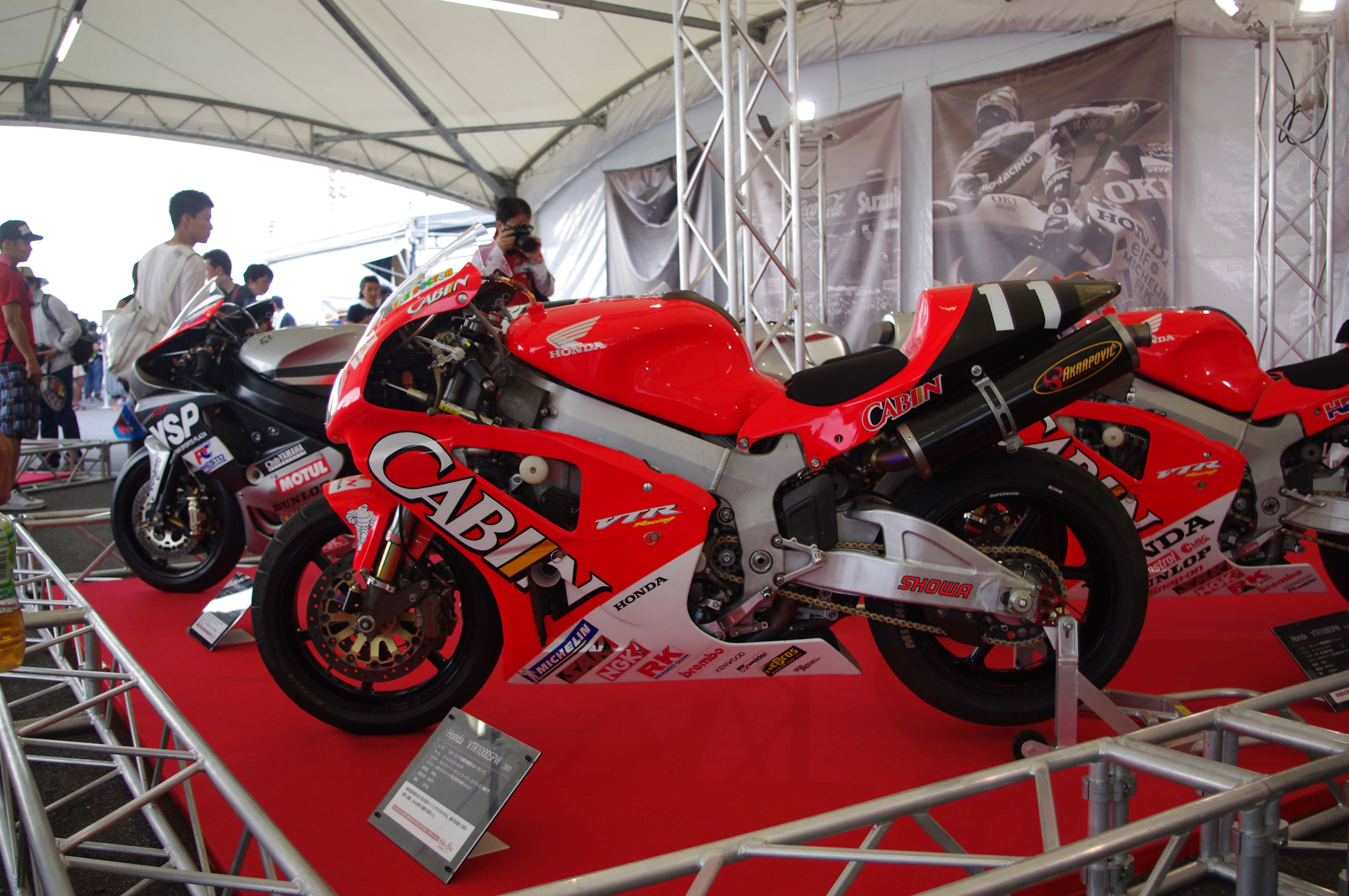
Colin Edwards and Valentino Rossi's bike no#11 Cabin-Honda VTR1000SPW, winner of 2001 Suzuka 8 Hours

Rossi participated in one race of the FIM Endurance World Championship (EWC), the Suzuka 8 Hours in Japan. He took part in the event in 2000, teaming up with Colin Edwards at the Castrol Honda Team and riding a Honda RC51. Unfortunately, they failed to finish. In 2001, Rossi teamed up with Colin Edwards and Manabu Kamada for Team Cabin Honda, and eventually won the title. They completed 217 laps on a Honda RC51, finishing ahead of Tadayuki Okada and Alex Barros by a narrow margin. Rossi became the first Italian rider in history to win the race. Rossi and Edwards managed to finish in 14th place in the final standings of the FIM Endurance World Championship.

=== Formula One ===
Rossi tested the Ferrari Formula One car in 2006 from 31 January to 2 February at the Circuit Ricardo Tormo in Valencia. The first test saw Rossi spin out on the damp track into the gravel trap, ending his day. On the second day, he posted the ninth-fastest time of fifteen drivers, approximately one second behind Michael Schumacher, who himself was third-fastest. Rossi lapped faster than seasoned drivers Red Bull Racing's Mark Webber and David Coulthard and Toyota F1's Jarno Trulli. On the final day of testing, Rossi was just a little more than a half second behind Schumacher's best time. Schumacher hailed Rossi as having immense talent and said he would be perfectly capable of moving to Formula One and being competitive immediately.

In May 2006, Rossi announced that he would be staying in MotoGP until he felt his work on the motorbike was "finished". Ferrari driver Schumacher said that he felt "saddened" by Rossi's decision but supported it. In 2008, Rossi tested a Ferrari F2008 at Mugello Circuit on 20 and 21 November 2008. Rossi's best time of 1:22.5 was only 1.5 seconds off Kimi Räikkönen best at Ferrari's previous Mugello test. In January 2010, Rossi said he believed he would be too old for F1 once he retired. Stefano Domenicali, Ferrari's Formula One Team principal, however, reasserted his wish to have a third Ferrari on the F1 grid driven by Rossi, whilst confirming that Rossi would test an older Ferrari F1 car on 21 and 22 January 2010.

=== Rally ===
In Rossi's youth, one of his heroes was WRC Champion Colin McRae. Rally legend McRae taught Rossi the basics of driving a rally car. The two competed against each other at the 2005 Monza Rally Show, with McRae driving a Skoda Fabia WRC and Rossi winning in a Subaru Impreza WRC. In October 2006 it was announced that Rossi would enter that year's Rally New Zealand, a World Rally Championship (WRC) event, which was to run from 17 to 19 November. He competed in a Subaru Impreza WRC04 finishing 11th out of 39. Rossi had been linked with a move to both Formula One and the World Rally Championship in 2007, having tested for Ferrari and competed in a number of rally events. He originally planned to use the Impreza WRC2008 during his participation in the Rally GB in December 2008, but decided to drive a Ford Focus RS WRC 07 instead. He finished the rally in 12th place, 13 minutes and 20.4 seconds behind eventual winner Sébastien Loeb.

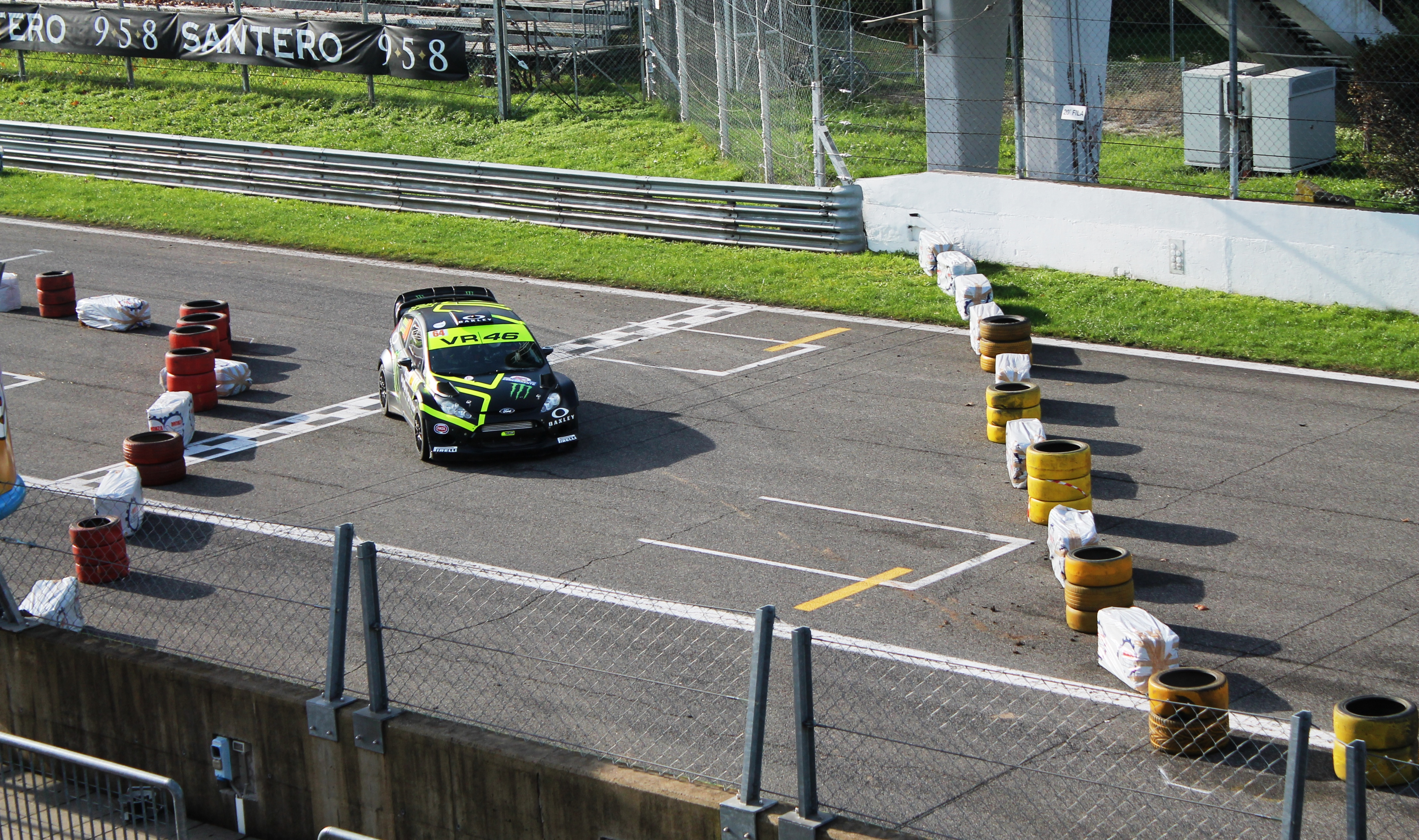
Rossi competing at Monza Rally Show in 2013

Rossi has won the Monza Rally Show title a record seven times, in 2006, 2007, 2012, 2015, 2016, 2017, and 2018, having participated since 1998. In 2018, he drove a Ford Fiesta WRC car. He passed the records of five-time winner Rinaldo Capello.

=== Gulf 12 Hour ===
Rossi competed in the 2019 Gulf 12 Hours at Yas Marina Circuit, behind the wheel of a Ferrari 488 GT3 owned by Kessel Racing. His co-drivers were his half-brother and Moto2 rider, Luca Marini, and Alessio Salucci. Rossi set the team's fastest lap time in qualifying, and his team secured an overall third place and a win in the Pro-Am class, despite picking up a five-second time penalty. In January 2021, he and his co-drivers Luca Marini and Alessio Salucci, driving a 488 GT3, competed in the 2020 Gulf 12 Hours at the Bahrain International Circuit and again took third place. In December 2023, Rossi finished second at the Gulf 12 Hours at Abu Dhabi, the season finale of the 2023 Intercontinental GT Challenge driving the BMW M4 GT3 with Team WRT. In the end, Rossi and teammates Dries Vanthoor and Nick Yelloly missed out on victory by 12 seconds.

Rossi founded a racing school with the name VR46 Racing Academy. This academy is a place for training and growth of young Italian drivers which was founded in 2014 in Tavullia, Italy.

Current VR46 Academy riders
Driver	Years	Current Series	Titles as VR46 Riders member
(Italy) Franco Morbidelli	2014–	MotoGP	Moto2 (2017)
(Italy) Francesco Bagnaia	2014–	MotoGP	Moto2 (2018)
(Italy) Luca Marini	2014–	MotoGP	none
(Italy) Andrea Migno	2014–	Trainer	none
(Italy) Marco Bezzecchi	2015–	MotoGP	none
(Italy) Celestino Vietti	2015–	Moto2	none
(Italy) Matteo Gabarini	2024–	ETC	none

Rossi is the owner of the junior-class team Sky Racing Team by VR46, which debuted in the Moto3 category of Grand Prix motorcycle racing in 2014 with riders Romano Fenati and Francesco Bagnaia with his former Cagiva teammate Vittoriano Guareschi as team manager. In 2015, Andrea Migno replaced Francesco Bagnaia and Guareschi was replaced by Alessio 'Uccio' Salucci and Carlo Alberto Tebaldi. The team also races in Moto2. In 2020, it was announced that Rossi's brand VR46 would back one machine from the Esponsorama Avintia team in the 2021 MotoGP season, to be ridden by his half-brother, Luca Marini.

VR46 Riders Academy began to reap the "investment" results through several academy drivers, including Franco Morbidelli, who became the 2017 world champion and then finished as the 2020 MotoGP runner-up. This achievement was then repeated by Francesco Bagnaia, who became the 2018 Moto2 world champion and then finished second in the 2021 MotoGP final standings. Finally, Bagnaia ended the long wait for VR46 Academy by becoming the 2022 MotoGP world champion.

In addition, there are several other names who have managed to compete at the top of the standings, such as Luca Marini, who was runner-up in Moto2 2020, Marco Bezzecchi, who managed to get third in the final Moto2 2021 standings, and several other riders in the academy.

In the 2020 season, the Sky Racing VR46 won the Moto2 teams championship by taking first place in the final standings after leading the standings with 380 points.

== Racing details ==
Since his early racing days, Rossi has had numerous nicknames. In the beginning of his career he was known as "Rossifumi" because he was a big fan of Japanese riders, most notably Norifumi Abe, who made a spectacular debut in the 500cc class as a wildcard rider in Japan. Rossi saw the race when he was only 14 years old and became a fan. Another early nickname, albeit not as known or popular, was "Valentinik". Since Rossi started to dominate, "The Doctor" has become the most common nickname for Rossi. Rossi may have adopted the nickname upon having earned a degree, or simply because of its respectful nature.

He has always raced with the number 46 in his motorcycle Grand Prix career, the number his father had raced with. Typically, a World Championship winner is awarded the No. 1 sticker for the next season. However, in a homage to Britain's Barry Sheene, who was the first rider of the modern era to keep the same number (#7), Rossi has stayed with the now-famous No. 46 throughout his career, though as the world champion he has worn the No. 1 on the shoulder of his racing leathers. The text on his helmet's visor refers to the name of his group of friends: "The Tribe of the Chihuahua", in Italian "Tribu Dei Chihuahua". This is also a reference to a tribe of natives found in the Mexican state of Chihuahua.

At the 2005 Spanish GP, Valentino Rossi's first performed a leg-waving move, which became known as the 'leg wave' or 'leg dangle'. Initially considered strange, the move gradually became accepted as a normal manoeuvre performed by MotoGP riders when entering corners, even in other races. Rossi could not explain it precisely, only saying that it "feels comfortable." Many riders, even top riders, imitate the move.

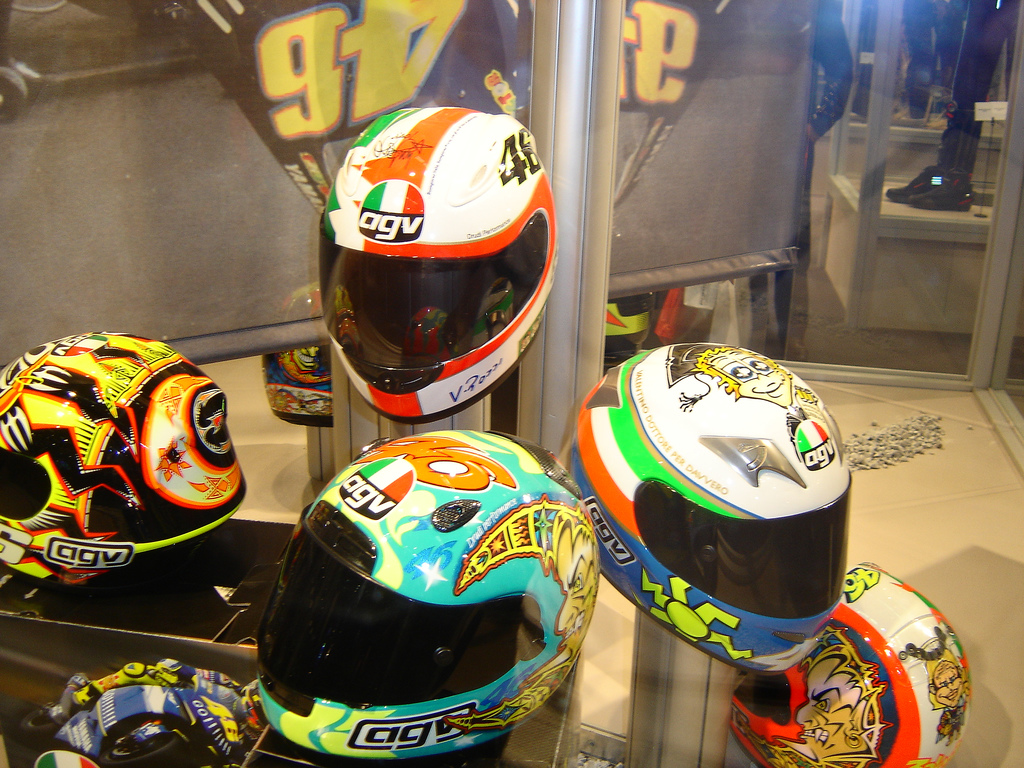
Various helmets used by Rossi

Rossi has gone through numerous helmet designs throughout his career, most featuring the Sun & Moon motif, signifying (according to Rossi) the two sides of his personality. His helmets are manufactured by AGV. Aldo Drudi was associated with Rossi's helmet graphics in 2010. Nearly every year, Rossi works with Aldo Drudi to design a unique helmet to use while racing at the Italian and San Marino Grand Prix.

Since commencing his Grand Prix career, Rossi has worn leathers from Dainese. In 1996 and 1997, Alpinestars was a sponsor on his bike, but did not supply Rossi with leathers. Alpinestars just supplied racing boots for Rossi. After Rossi joined the Yamaha factory team, the team wore shirts from Alpinestars, while Rossi maintained his association with Dainese. In 2011 and 2012, Rossi was a member of the Ducati factory team, where the team wore shirts from Puma, while Rossi still maintained his association with Dainese. Dainese has created a special helmet for Rossi, including a limited edition that celebrates his achievements and career. Dainese and AGV (a helmet manufacturer that also collaborates with Rossi) have released limited-edition collections to celebrate Rossi's birthday and his incredible career.

== Personal life ==
After leaving the family home in Tavullia, he moved to Milan before taking up residence in London, England, during his period with Honda. During this time he acquired a villa in Ibiza which he still owns, and following the tax case returned to his main residence to live close to his family in Italy. Rossi is a practising Catholic.

Though Tavullia falls in the Marche region on the border with Emilia-Romagna, Rossi has been known to identify also with the historical region of Romagna. In June 2017, at an inauguration of a swimming pool in Pesaro, the provincial capital, Giovanni Malagò, President of the Italian National Olympic Committee, was booed for saying that Rossi was "a little here [Marche] and a little there [Romagna]".

In 2002, Rossi received threats from an Italian-Spanish anarchist movement, which in those days sent parcel bombs to people it considered targets in either of the two countries. The anarchists considered Rossi "guilty" because, at the time, he rode for Honda's MotoGP factory team, it had been sponsored by the oil company Repsol since 1994 (for which he filmed a commercial in Spain), with their logo displayed on both the motorcycle and on his race suits.

On 31 May 2005, he received an honorary degree in Communications and Advertising for Organizations. In March 2010, the Italian Foreign Minister Franco Frattini delivered to Rossi the first Winning Italy Award for his contribution to the promotion of Italy's image in the world.

Rossi has a maternal half-brother, Luca Marini, 2020 Moto2 season runner-up who was racing for the Sky Racing Team by VR46. In 2021, Marini moved to the MotoGP class joining the Esponsorama team using the Sky VR46 livery on his bike, before moving over to Rossi's VR46 Racing Team for the 2022 season.

On 4 March 2022, he had a daughter with his partner, Francesca Sofia Novello. She is named Giulietta Rossi. In July 2024, Valentino Rossi announced his partner was pregnant with his second child, another daughter. On 4 January 2025, they welcomed the birth of their second child, a daughter named Gabriella Rossi.

Rossi enjoys a wide variety of music genres. He is said to be a fan of The Prodigy, Rage Against the Machine, Bob Marley, and more soft rock bands. Since childhood, he has had a hobby of riding bicycles, including BMX.

=== Business ===
Besides having a racing team, Rossi also has other businesses such as merchandise, apparel, and many other things with the VR46 brand. In Tavullia, he also has a place of business with the name Tavullia 46. Tavullia 46 owns various entities such as pizza restaurants and ice cream shops.

=== Reported earnings ===
According to Sports Illustrated, Rossi is one of the highest-earning sports personalities in the world, having earned an estimated $34 million in 2007. In 2009 Forbes ranked Rossi as number nine among the world's highest-paid athletes having earned an estimated $35 million in the past year. When he returned to the Yamaha family in 2013, Forbes listed Rossi as the highest-paid athlete in the world. According to Forbes, Rossi earned US$12 million from that race. Rossi is not just a celebrity, but also one of the highest-paid world-class athletes. He also receives endorsements from several brands. Forbes also noted that Rossi can earn up to US$10 million per endorsement.

=== Tax avoidance case ===
Rossi was investigated by the Italian tax authorities for tax evasion in 2002 but the investigation proved unsuccessful.

In 2007, the Italian tax authorities declared Rossi was being investigated for suspected tax evasion. The authorities announced they were investigating Rossi for undeclared revenues of 112 million euros ($160 million) between 2000 and 2004. The officials said, against the European Taxes Agreements among European countries, Rossi's London residency has enabled him to take advantage of favourable tax conditions, such as only declaring earnings made in Britain and avoiding taxes on his lucrative merchandising and sponsorship contracts, commenting that Rossi had residency in London but his "centre of interests" was not there, as shown by a thorough investigation. It noted that in 2002, Rossi's Italian tax form declared earnings of 500 euros, while sponsorship contracts were all reported to be made out to foreign companies, but with his affairs controlled mainly from Italy. In February 2008, Rossi announced that he had reached a settlement with the Italian tax authorities: he paid 35 million euros to close the tax case. He also plea-bargained a suspended sentence of six months' imprisonment for non-declaration of income.

=== Video game ===
In November 2015, Milestone srl announced the development of Valentino Rossi: The Game, to be released for Microsoft Windows, PlayStation 4, and Xbox One, with Rossi officially endorsing the game. It was then released on 16 June 2016, and it is also the official video game of the 2016 MotoGP season.

=== Other hobbies ===
Rossi has supported the Italian football club Inter Milan since 1990. After he won world titles in 2008 and 2009, Inter congratulated him via their website.

At the 2015 Argentine Grand Prix, Rossi wore a replica Diego Maradona football shirt on the podium in tribute to Maradona after Rossi won the race. Maradona congratulated him via his Facebook.

== In popular culture ==
Valentino Rossi

YouTube information
- Channel: valentinorossiracingVR46
- Years active: 2012–present
- Genres: Sports; Entertainment
- Subscribers: 323 thousand
- Views: 34 million
- Last updated: 21 June 2025

Valentino Rossi has a YouTube channel called valentinorossiracing. On the channel, he shares various content related to his life in racing, including his VR46 team, which competes in MotoGP. In addition, the channel also features videos from off-track, such as daily activities, interviews, and behind-the-scenes footage from various events he participates in.

Lando Norris wore a special helmet design at the 2019 Italian Grand Prix at Monza Circuit, Italy. The helmet was predominantly blue and featured a 'Soleluna' motif to honour Rossi. Similarly, Alex Albon's helmet at the 2024 United States Grand Prix featured several motifs associated with Rossi.

In Tavullia, Italy, there is a private museum of Valentino Rossi in his hometown. The museum is called 'Route 46' and displays various historical collections from his racing career, including motorcycles, helmets, racing equipment, and trophies.

== Media career ==
=== Filmography ===
In 2003, a film entitled Faster was released, produced by Mark Neale. This film tells the story of racing rivalries in the late 500cc class and the early MotoGP era. Faster focuses on the racing rivalries of 2001 and 2002, the early years of Rossi's MotoGP championship reign with Honda. Then in 2004, the film Faster & Faster was released, focusing on the fierce rivalry between Valentino Rossi and Max Biaggi. In 2011, Mark Neale released a documentary titled Fastest. It chronicles the MotoGP rivalry of the 2000s, focusing on Rossi. In 2015, a MotoGP documentary titled Hitting the Apex was released, directed by Mark Neale and produced and narrated by Brad Pitt. The film chronicles the journeys of six MotoGP riders: Jorge Lorenzo, Marc Márquez, Dani Pedrosa, Valentino Rossi, Marco Simoncelli, and Casey Stoner. The film highlights not only the racing action but also the human side of the riders, including sad moments such as Marco Simoncelli's death in a crash at Sepang. Hitting the Apex is considered one of the best MotoGP documentaries ever made. In 2016, Monster Energy released the miniseries Valentino Rossi: The Doctor - Series, which chronicles the nine-time world champion's success on the track, character, and appeal to fans.

== Honours ==
In November 2021, Rossi was officially inducted into the MotoGP Hall of Fame at the FIM MotoGP awards ceremony. In December 2022, he received the Lifetime Achievement Award for his great services to the world of motorcycle racing, given in a circle-shaped trophy with the words 'Grazie Vale' written on it. The award was given directly by FIM President Jorge Viegas to Valentino Rossi at the FIM Awards event held in Rimini, Italy.

== Awards and nominations ==
Name of the award ceremony, year presented, category, nominee of the award, and the result of the nomination
Award ceremony	Year	Category	Nominee / Work	Result	Ref.
Laureus World Sports Awards	2004	Sportsman of the Year	Valentino Rossi	Nominated	
Laureus World Sports Awards	2005	Sportsman of the Year	Valentino Rossi	Nominated	
Laureus World Sports Awards	2006	Sportsman of the Year	Valentino Rossi	Nominated	
Laureus World Sports Awards	2009	Sportsman of the Year	Valentino Rossi	Nominated	
Laureus World Sports Awards	2010	Sportsman of the Year	Valentino Rossi	Nominated	
Laureus World Sports Awards	2011	Comeback of the Year	Valentino Rossi	Won	

== Bibliography ==
- Rossi, Valentino (2006). Valentino Rossi – The Autobiography: What if I had never tried it. Translated by Gabriele Marcotti. With Enrico Borghi. Arrow Books. ISBN 978-0-09-948696-1.
- Rossi, Valentino (10 September 2009). What If I Had Never Tried It: The Autobiography. Motorbooks. ISBN 978-0760337561.
- Scott, Michael (1 January 2018). Valentino Rossi: Life of a Legend. Motorbooks. ISBN 978-0760357415.
- Barker, Stuart (12 November 2020). Valentino Rossi: The Definitive Biography. John Blake Publishing. ISBN 978-1789462951.
- Oxley, Mat (13 January 2022). Valentino Rossi: All His Races. Evro Publishing. ISBN 978-1910505212.

Preceded by Ivan Cremonini	125cc Motorcycle Italian Champion; 1995	Succeeded by Igor Antonelli
Preceded by Daijiro Kato; Tohru Ukawa	Suzuka 8 Hours winner 2001; With: Colin Edwards	Succeeded by Daijiro Kato; Colin Edwards
