= Mason Vicentino =

- Comune
- Mason Vicentino
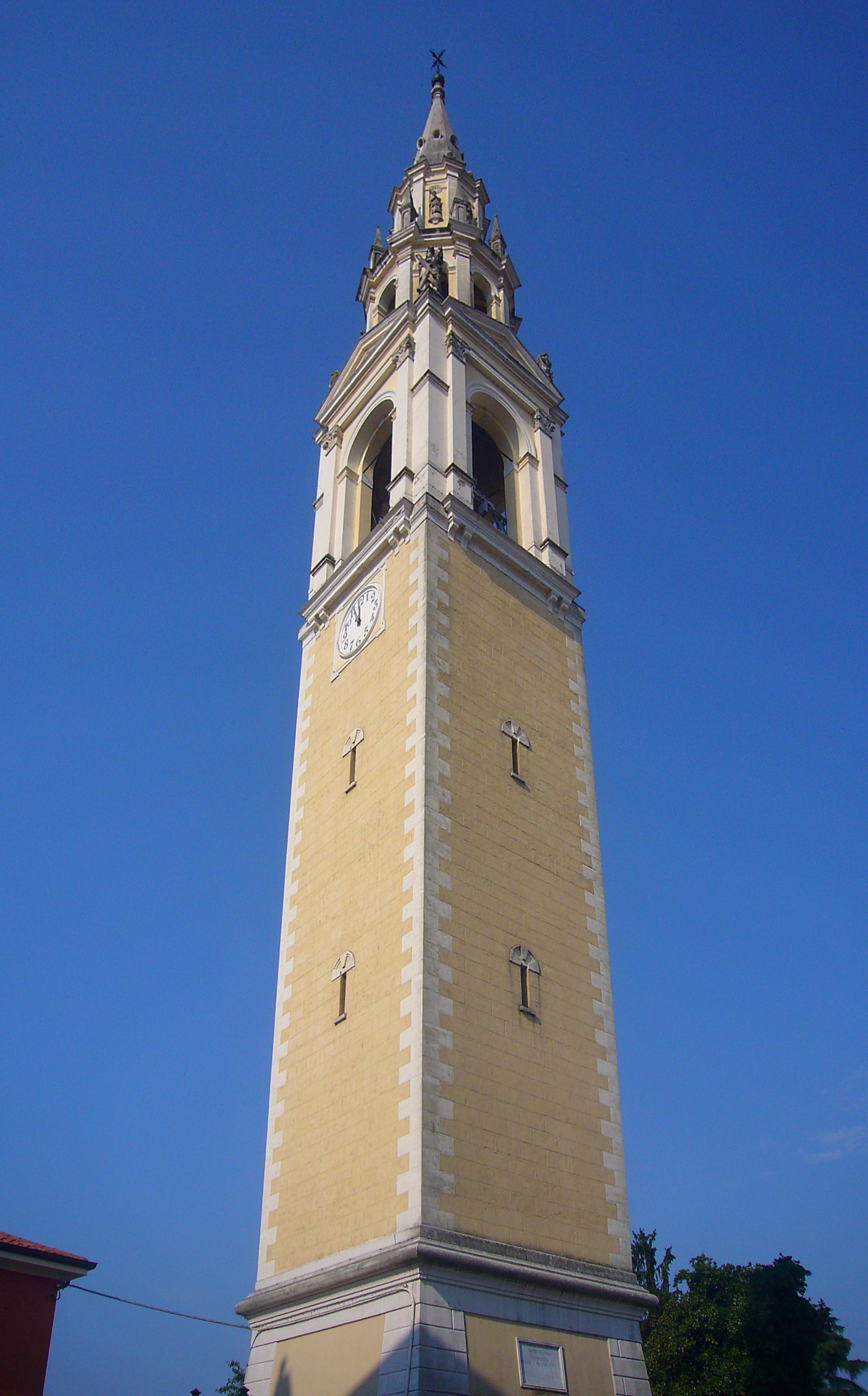
- St. Andrew the Apostle Church, Mason Vicentino, Colceresa

- Location within Italy Location within Veneto
- Coordinates: 45°43′N 11°36′E
- Country: Italy
- Region: Veneto
- Province: Vicenza (VI)

Area
  - Total: 12 km^{2} (4.6 sq mi)
- Elevation: 104 m (341 ft)

Population ((30-9-2017))
  - Total: 3 498
  - Density: 0.25/km^{2} (0.65/sq mi)
- Time zone: UTC+1 (CET)
  - Summer (DST): UTC+2 (CEST)
- Postal code: 36064
- Dialing code: 0424
- ISTAT code: 024058
- Website: Official website

Mason Vicentino is a locality of the municipality of Colceresa in the province of Vicenza, Veneto, Italy. Via Braglio goes through it.

It was a municipality itself until February 20, 2019, after a referendum on December 16, 2018. The merging of the former municipalities of Mason and Molvena created the larger municipality of Colceresa.
