= Colceresa =

- Comune
- Comune di Colceresa
- Location within Veneto Location within Italy
- Coordinates: 45°43′10″N 11°36′28″E
- Country: Italy
- Region: Veneto
- Province: Vicenza (VI)
- Frazioni: Molvena, Mason, Mure, Villa, Villaraspa

Area
  - Total: 19.40 km^{2} (7.49 sq mi)

Population (31 October 2018)
  - Total: 6,052
  - Density: 312.0/km^{2} (808.0/sq mi)
- Time zone: UTC+1 (CET)
  - Summer (DST): UTC+2 (CEST)
- Postal code: 36064
- Dialing code: 0424
- ISTAT code: 024126

Colceresa is a comune in the province of Vicenza, Veneto region of Italy. It was formed on 20 February 2019 with the merger of the comunes of Mason Vicentino and Molvena.

== Sport ==
ASD Colceresa is the towns' football team based in Colceresa, that hosts his home matches in both Mason and Molvena and currently plays in the Italian Prima Categoria, the 7th tier of the Italian football league system.

== Twin towns – sister cities ==
Colceresa is twinned with:

- Louvigny, France. Since 2001
