= Ashtapada =

Indian board game

	a	b	c	d	e	f	g	h
8	a8	b8	c8	d8	e8	f8	g8	h8	8
7	a7	b7	c7	d7	e7	f7	g7	h7	7
6	a6	b6	c6	d6	e6	f6	g6	h6	6
5	a5	b5	c5	d5	e5	f5	g5	h5	5
4	a4	b4	c4	d4	e4	f4	g4	h4	4
3	a3	b3	c3	d3	e3	f3	g3	h3	3
2	a2	b2	c2	d2	e2	f2	g2	h2	2
1	a1	b1	c1	d1	e1	f1	g1	h1	1
	a	b	c	d	e	f	g	h

Ashtāpada, the uncheckered 8×8 board (sometimes with special marks) on which Chaturanga was also played

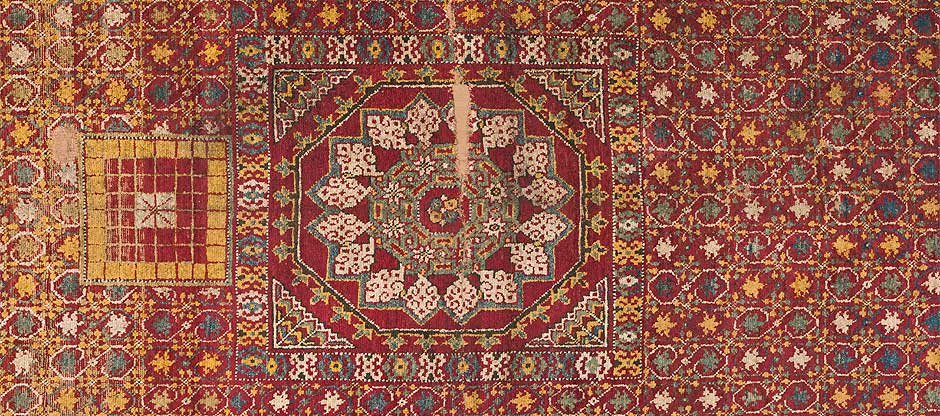
Carpet with the Ashtapada board (detail). India or Iran, 15th-century. Museum of Islamic Art, Doha

Ashtāpada (Sanskrit: अष्टापद) or Ashtapadi is an Indian board game. Although it is played on a checkered board similar to chess, Ashtāpada predates it and differs in its mechanics and victory conditions. The game was mentioned on the list of games that Gautama Buddha would not play. Chaturanga, which could be played on the same board, appeared sometime around the 6th century in India; it could be played by two to four participants.

Variants played on different boards include Daśapada (Sanskrit: दशपद). and, in Gujarat, Chomal Ishto or Chomal Eshto. Similar traditional games can be found in China and Korea.

== Etymology ==
The word Ashtāpada is a Sanskrit term describing the 8×8 board that the game is played on. This meaning was first recorded by Patanjali in a Mahābhāshya book written in the 2nd century. The game was even condemned in an early Brahman text, the Sutrakrilānga.

== Rules ==
Like a chessboard, the Ashtāpada board is divided into an 8×8 grid of squares, although they are all the same color. The board has special markings known as "castles", where pieces are safe from being captured or removed from play.

Each player receives an even number of pieces to play the game. The goal is to move a piece around the board clockwise, entering the castle, and to regain his castle back in a counterclockwise direction so as to make it reach the center.

== Variants ==
A variant played on a larger 10×10 board is known as Daśapada (Sanskrit: दशपद).

A variant played on smaller 5×5 board is known as Chomal Ishto or Chomal Eshto in Gujarat. Each player has four pieces to play and retrieve after reaching the center. The game is generally played with cowrie shells instead of dice. It is similar to Chowka bhara.

In Korea, the board of the traditional game Yonghossangnyuk (Korean: 용호쌍륙) is similar to Ashtapada.

== See also ==
- Ashte kashte
- Chowka bhara
