= Indian Film Festival of Los Angeles =

- Location: Los Angeles, California, United States
- Established: 2003
- Founded by: Christina Marouda

The Indian Film Festival of Los Angeles (IFFLA) is an annual film festival held in Los Angeles, California. Established by Christina Marouda in 2003, as a nonprofit organization devoted to paving the way for a greater appreciation of Indian cinema and diverse culture by providing the public with a selection of films from and about the Indian diaspora by Indian and international filmmakers.

It features, documentaries and shorts and presents Grand Jury and Audience Choice awards in the following categories: Best Feature, Best Documentary, and Best Short. The IFFLA's Cinematic Scoring Achievement Award is given to composers, honoring film scores. In 2022, the festival is completing 20 years of existence.

== Founding ==
Marouda, a film lover of Greek descent established the festival to garner greater appreciation amongst Western audiences to all forms of Cinema in India. Growing up in Crete, she watched several Indian films, growing up with the films of Satyajit Ray and Nargis, and watched several mainstream Bollywood films, Bengali films and Tamil films during a trip to India in 1999. Whilst enjoying the "ride from laughter to crying" that Hindi films can take audiences on, the festival was not looking to promote Bollywood cinema as much for there were already outlets for this. Marouda has expressed her admiration for director Mani Ratnam, Rajiv Menon's Kandukondain Kandukondain and The Apu Trilogy.

== Individual festivals ==
=== 2003 ===
The first IFFLA was held in 2003.

Awards

Audience Award for Best Picture - Kannathil Muthamittal (Mani Ratnam)

=== 2006 ===
Awards

Cinematic Scoring achievement Award - Gingger Shankar

Shankar is a Tamil violinist who received the award for her contributions to The Passion of the Christ.

=== 2007 ===
April 17–22, 2007 at ArcLight Hollywood. The festival was attended by Quentin Tarantino.

Opening Night film : Provoked ( Jag Mundhra)
Closing Night film : Vanaja (film) (Rajnesh Domalpalli).
Tribute Honorée : Deepti Naval.

Awards

Grand Jury Prize for Best Feature: VALLEY OF FLOWERS (Pan Nalin)

Special Mention, VANAJA directed by Rajnesh Domalpalli

Grand Jury Prize for Best Documentary: Q2P (Paromita Vohra)

Grand Jury Prize for Best Short: TEA BREAK (Srinivas Sunderrajan)

Special Mention, PRINTED RAINBOW directed by Gitanjali Rao

Audience Award for Best Feature: Outsourced Directed by John Jeffcoat

Audience Award for Best Documentary: DIVIDED WE FALL directed by Sharat Raju

Audience Award for Best Short: MONSOON directed by Shyam Balsé

=== 2008 ===
22–27 April 2008 at ArcLight Hollywood.

Tribute honoree: Madhuri Dixit.
Opening gala: Amal (Richie Mehta)
Closing gala: Mumbai Cutting...A City Unfolds

Program

Docu shorts (QUAMAR - WORKING TO LIVE, SILENT HUES, UNDER THE AHMEDABAD SKY (Sotto Il Cielo Di Ahmedabad))
BEFORE THE RAINS, A HOME IN THE SKY (Aevdhese Aabhaal), FOUR WOMEN (Naalu Pennungal), SUPER 30 (preceded by THE LOST RAINBOW)

Narrative shorts (BEAST, LOVE STORY, THE LOST RAINBOW (Haravilele Indradhanush), MIDNIGHT LOST AND FOUND, THE MORNING RITUAL, THE RETURN (Vaapsi), REWIND, SARI (W)RAP, THREE OF US)

KISSING COUSINS, THE POOL, LOST MOON (Khoya Khoya Chand), FROZEN

Madhuri Dixit tribute: THE DEATH SENTENCE (Mrityudand), JOHNNY GADDAAR

Narrative shorts (BEAST, LOVE STORY, THE LOST RAINBOW (Haravilele Indradhanush), MIDNIGHT LOST AND FOUND, THE MORNING RITUAL, THE RETURN (Vaapsi), REWIND, SARI (W)RAP, THREE OF US)

MY HEART IS CRAZY (Dil To Pagal Hai), THE SEA WITHIN (Ore Kadal), THE GLOW OF WHITE WOMEN
AN UNENDING JOURNEY, Shot in Bombay, BOBBY

Docu Shorts (QUAMAR - WORKING TO LIVE, SILENT HUES, UNDER THE AHMEDABAD SKY (Sotto Il Cielo Di Ahmedabad))
STARS ON EARTH (Taare Zameen Par), THE SKY BELOW

=== 2009 ===
April 21–27, 2009.

Opening Night Gala: The Fakir of Venice (Anand Surapur)
Centerpiece Gala: Heaven on Earth (Deepa Mehta)
Closing Gala: Yes Madam, Sir (docu, Megan Doneman)

Awards

Grand Jury Prize for Best Feature: Sita Sings the Blues (Nina Paley)

Program

SIKANDAR - Piyush Jha, FIRAAQ - Nandita Das, AIR INDIA 182 (docu, Sturla Gunnarsson), THE DAMNED RAIN (Gabhricha Paus, Satish Manwar),
GANDHI, MY FATHER - Feroz Abbas Khan, LITTLE ZIZOU - Sooni Taraporevala, LEAVING HOME: THE LIFE AND MUSIC OF INDIAN OCEAN (Docu, Jaideep Varma)

QUICK GUN MURUGAN - Shashank Ghosh, VIRASAT - Priyadarshan, KANCHIVARAM (Priyadarshan), CHILDREN OF THE PYRE (docu, Rajesh S. Jala),

Sita Sings the Blues (Nina Paley), SIDDHARTH THE PRISONER (Pryas Gupta), BOMBAY SUMMER (Joseph Mathew Varghese), LAMHE (Yash Chopra)
DHIN TAK DHA (short, Shraddha Pasi), Supermen of Malegaon (Faiza Ahmad Khan), NAYA DAUR (B.R. Chopra), 7 DAYS IN SLOW MOTION (Umakanth Thumrugoti)

=== 2018 ===
Audience Award for Best Picture - Take Off (Mahesh Narayanan)

=== 2019 ===
April 11–14, 2019 at Regal L.A.

Opening Night Gala: Andhadhun

Centerpiece Gala:

Closing Gala: The Odds

==== Awards ====
Grand Jury Prize for Best Feature: Wisdom of Silence

The audience awards: Vivek/Reason

== See also ==
- Film festivals in North and Central America
