= Vanaja =

Vanaja may mean:

- Vanaja (film), a 2006 Indian film by Rajnesh Domalpalli
- Vanaja (Finland), a former Finnish municipality and Iron Age archaeological excavation
- Vanajavesi, a lake in Finland
- Vanajan Autotehdas, a defunct producer of Vanaja heavy vehicles in Hämeenlinna, Finland
