= 10/90 =

10/90 may refer to:

- Mullet (haircut)
- 10/90, a production model for a television show
