= Choco Panda =

Ice cream brand

Choco Panda, also called chocolito, is an ice cream sold in Chile and made by Trendy, under the Panda brand. It is made of cream covered in chocolate. It is considered a cheap product which is usually sold by street vendors (vendedor ambulante) aboard public transportation buses.

A mullet haircut is humorously called a "chocopanda" or "chocolo" in Chile, after the mullets usually worn by street vendors selling the ice cream.
