= Anisha Nagarajan =

American actress and singer

- Born: Evanston, Illinois, US
- Occupation: Actress
- Known for: Bombay Dreams, Outsourced
- Spouse: Aalok Mehta (m. 2005)

Anisha Nagarajan is an American actress and singer. She is best known for her roles in the Andrew Lloyd Webber theater musical, Bombay Dreams, and as Madhuri on the 2010 NBC television series, Outsourced.

== Early life ==
Nagarajan's parents are immigrants from India. Her mother, Geetha Nagarajan, is a former developmental specialist at Western Psychiatric Institute & Clinic. Her father, Nandu Nagarajan, is a professor at the Joseph M. Katz Graduate School of Business at the University of Pittsburgh.

Anisha was born in Evanston, Illinois, and was raised in the Squirrel Hill neighborhood of Pittsburgh, Pennsylvania, before moving with her family to the suburb of Fox Chapel. Anisha grew up performing piano under the tutelage of Natasha Snitkovsky. She performed at Carnegie Hall at the age of ten. She also studied Carnatic Classical music. When she was fifteen years old, Nagarajan spent a year at a boarding school in India, where she choreographed their production of Joseph and the Amazing Technicolor Dreamcoat.

She was also a member of the Fox Chapel Area High School choir. In 2001, Nagarajan was one of ten Pennsylvania students chosen to audition for the Multicultural National Honor Choir in San Antonio, Texas. She was a high school senior at the time.

She graduated from Fox Chapel Area High School in 2002, where she starred in musical productions alongside famous playwright and composer, Michael Mitnick. She studied acting at New York University (NYU) after high school at the Tisch School of Arts Drama department. She was cast as the female lead in the Broadway musical Bombay Dreams as Priya during her second year at NYU. She married actor Aalok Mehta, who co-starred in the musical.

== Career ==
Nagarajan appeared in a number of regional theater productions following Bombay Dreams, including the Hangar Theater production of Rent in Ithaca, New York and The Wiz at the La Jolla Playhouse in San Diego, California. In 2006, she performed in A.R. Rahman's "Bollywood Night" at the Hollywood Bowl in Los Angeles.

She returned to NYU and finished her bachelor's degree at New York University.

Nagarajan was cast as Madhuri, a shy, soft-spoken call center employee in the NBC series, Outsourced. She has also Guest starred on Grey's Anatomy, Code Black, Scandal and Ugly Betty. She created the role of Alice in Mira Nair's Musical adaptation of Monsoon Wedding premiering at Berkeley Repertory Theatre.

Nagarajan is currently performing in Stephen Sondheim's Company on Broadway in the ensemble and understudying for the characters of Joanne and Susan.

== Filmography ==
| Year | Film | Role | Notes |
|---|---|---|---|
| 2004 | Bombay Dreams | | |
| 2006 | Hope and a Little Sugar | | |
| 2007 | The Trident | Arjun's wife | Short |
| 2009 | Ugly Betty | | |
| 2010 | Outsourced | Madhuri | |
| 2012 | Squad 85 | | |
| 2013 | Rita | NoraN | |
| 2014 | Grey's Anatomy | Rita Chaudhury | |
| 2015 | Jane Wants a Boyfriend | Cynthia | |
| 2016 | Code Black | Serana | |
| 2019 | Gen:Lock | Dr. Fatima Jha | |
