= Outsourced (TV series) =

American sitcom

- Genre: Sitcom
- Based on: Outsourced by George Wing; John Jeffcoat
- Developed by: Robert Borden
- Starring: Ben Rappaport; Anisha Nagarajan; Diedrich Bader; Parvesh Cheena; Pippa Black; Rebecca Hazlewood; Rizwan Manji; Sacha Dhawan
- Theme music composer: Michael A. Levine
- Composer: Transcenders
- Country of origin: United States
- Original language: English
- No. of seasons: 1
- No. of episodes: 22

Production
- Executive producers: Ken Kwapis; Robert Borden; Victor Nelli Jr.; Tom Gorai; David Skinner
- Producers: James Simons; Jim Ellis; Patrick Walsh; Sonny Lee
- Camera setup: Single-camera
- Running time: 21–23 minutes
- Production companies: In Cahoots Productions; Universal Media Studios; Open 4 Business Productions

Original release
- Network: NBC
- Release: September 23, 2010 – May 12, 2011

Outsourced is an American sitcom television series set in an Indian workplace. It is based on the film of the same name and adapted by Robert Borden for Universal Media Studios and NBC. The series originally ran from September 23, 2010 to May 12, 2011. The show was officially picked up by NBC on May 7, 2010 and on October 18, 2010, the show received a full season order. Outsourced was filmed at Radford Studios in Studio City, Los Angeles, California.

When the renewal of the show was not announced with renewal of other NBC shows, the cast and crew started a campaign for fans of the show to request its renewal. On May 13, 2011, NBC canceled Outsourced after one season.

Outsourced is set in a call center in Mumbai, India, where an American novelties company has recently outsourced its order processing. A lone American manages the call center and must explain American popular culture to his employees as he tries to understand Indian culture.

== Cast and characters ==
=== Main ===
- Ben Rappaport as Todd Dempsy, a Kansas City native who is transferred to India to run the call center for Mid American Novelties. He does not understand Indian culture and is constantly offending workers unintentionally. He eventually becomes more aware of Indian culture. He is currently employed as executive manager.
- Rizwan Manji as Rajiv Gidwani, Todd's assistant manager at Mid American Novelties. He is hard-nosed and unapologetic and he aspires to be Todd's replacement (whether due to Todd's success or his downfall). When Todd is promoted to executive manager, Rajiv is promoted to manager. His intentions are not to be mean, but to only run the company professionally and business-like. It has long been his dream to become a successful business manager so he can gain the approval of the wealthy father of Vimi, whom he has loved since childhood and wishes to marry. Once he becomes manager, he marries Vimi.
- Sacha Dhawan as Manmeet, a call center employee for Mid American Novelties, who dreams of America and quickly becomes good friends with his boss, Todd Dempsy. He is known for being the "hip" one, who is fascinated by American culture. Manmeet is girl-crazy; he has had several "over the phone" relationships with American callers and flirts with almost every woman he meets. He seems more interested in American women than Indian women, stating in one episode that American women are not concerned with his father's occupation or where he went to school. This, along with his reluctance to ask one of Tonya's friends to dance at a Halloween party, indicates that Manmeet may actually have a bit of an inferiority complex.
- Rebecca Hazlewood as Asha, a call center employee for Mid American Novelties and eventual love interest of Todd. She is frequently the voice of reason in the office and plans to pursue an arranged marriage. Early in the series, Todd develops feelings for Asha, who, while responding in some ways, eventually re-asserts her commitment to the arranged marriage process, leading Todd to develop a relationship with Tonya. In the penultimate episode, Tonya breaks up with Todd because he still has feelings for Asha. In the last scene of the finale, Asha, having earlier expressed doubts about her fiancé, tells Todd he should fight for what he wants, and takes his hand as they gaze at the celebratory crowd at Rajiv and Vimi's wedding, strongly implying that she wants him to fight for her because of her feelings for him as well.
- Parvesh Cheena as Gupta, a very talkative call center employee for Mid American Novelties, who constantly yearns to be the center of attention. After Todd inspires him to grab some independence from his parents, Gupta rents his own place in the apartment directly above Todd's.
- Anisha Nagarajan as Madhuri, a shy and soft-spoken call center employee for Mid American Novelties whose income supports her entire family. As time passes, Madhuri opens up, becoming one of the office gossips. Madhuri also has a beautiful singing voice, and the others convince her to enter a singing contest.
- Diedrich Bader as American Charlie Davies, a call center manager for the company All-American Hunter. Charlie is friendly and has good intentions but is somewhat socially clueless and a bit gruff, leading to many humorous situations. For several episodes, Charlie nurses a crush on Tonya, convinced he has a chance at a relationship despite her obvious disinterest in him romantically.
- Pippa Black as Tonya, an Australian call center manager for the company Koala Airlines who is easygoing and flirtatious with a sense of adventure; by mid-season, she and Todd are romantically involved and remain so until just before the end of the series.

=== Recurring ===
- Guru Singh as Ajeet, a tall, silent Sikh whose character frequently shows displeasure at Todd's cultural gaffes. A poet, he first speaks in the season finale, where he becomes Madhuri's love interest and his character is given a more prominent role.
- Thushari Jayasekera as Pinky, a fun and hardworking call center worker at Mid America Novelties, who is adventure seeking and ready to learn. Does funny and awkward things. Ready to defend her fellow call center team as well as party with the big boss. Played largest role in the season finale.
- Manish Dayal and the A-Team, a group of well-dressed executive employees for a computer support call center located in the same building. The group are conspicuously rude, snobby, and taunting.
- Matt Walsh as Jerry Stern, Todd's supervisor in the U.S.; he is business focused and often reminds Todd of tough choices Todd is reluctant to make, such as firing a staff member due to poor sales.
- Santosh, the maid at Todd's apartment.
- Sarayu Rao in the Jolly Vindaloo Day episodes and Noureen DeWulf in later episodes as Vimi, Rajiv's fiancée and eventual wife.
- Shivam Tibrewala as call center playboy.

== Episodes ==
No.	Title	Directed by	Written by	Original release date	U.S. viewers (millions)
1	"Pilot"	Ken Kwapis	George Wing & John Jeffcoat	September 23, 2010	7.44
When Todd Dempsy finishes management training for his job at Mid America Novelties, he finds that his call center has been outsourced to Mumbai, India, and that in order to keep his job, he must relocate to India and manage the call center there. Upon arrival, he is greeted by Rajiv, his assistant manager who is interested in replacing him, and who introduces him to the rest of his employees. He also meets two other call center managers: Charlie, who gives him advice over lunch, and later Tonya, who immediately shows a romantic interest in him.
2	"The Measure of a Manmeet"	Victor Nelli, Jr.	Paul A. Kaplan & Mark Torgove	September 30, 2010	5.85
Management tasks Todd with evaluating his team, and laying off an employee due to low revenues. Gupta believes that he will be the one laid off as he incorrectly lip-reads Rajiv and Todd's conversation. Todd is invited by Manmeet to a hotel to eat steak and quickly befriends him. Todd finds out that the reason why revenue is down is because Manmeet flirts with his customers instead of selling products. He confronts Manmeet, who uses his flirtatiousness to sell more novelties and increasing revenue, so no one needs to be laid off.
3	"Party of Five"	Gail Mancuso	Robert Borden	October 7, 2010	5.22
Todd and Charlie plan a double date with Asha and Tonya, only to have Gupta tag along.
4	"Jolly Vindaloo Day"	Victor Nelli, Jr.	Linda Videtti Figueiredo	October 14, 2010	5.40
Rajiv attempts to keep Todd out of the office while his potential father-in-law visits. Some of the employees deal with harassment from the A-Team.
5	"Touched by an Anglo"	Ken Kwapis	Michael Pennie	October 21, 2010	4.95
A shipment of sexual novelties leads to a seminar on sexual harassment. Someone calls the company hot-line to file a complaint against Todd.
6	"Bolloween"	Michael Lehmann	Sonny Lee & Patrick Walsh	October 28, 2010	5.94
Todd explains Halloween to the employees, and throws a party to get closer to Asha.
7	"Truly, Madly, Pradeeply"	Victor Nelli, Jr.	Michael Loftus	November 4, 2010	5.74
As Asha's arranged marriage process moves forward, Manmeet helps Todd infiltrate her list of potential suitors. Rajiv attempts to end Gupta's new-found enticement with chewing paan.
8	"Home for the Diwalidays"	Linda Mendoza	Vera Santamaria	November 11, 2010	5.48
Todd wonders why everyone is well-dressed and finds out it is Diwali. He asks Management if he can give his employees time off for it and is denied. Todd decides to let them leave, and handle the calls himself, while Tonya tries to invite for a few drinks he declines and says he has to work. She suggests he put the call center on voicemail, they have sex in the break room table but is caught by Asha; who comes back to the office to help Todd out. Meanwhile, Rajiv buys a Sari for his fiancee that gets burned by fireworks and he ends up buying an overpriced sari from Madhuri
9	"Temporary Monsanity"	Reggie Hudlin	Laura Gutin	November 18, 2010	5.43
Todd pressures the employees in attempt to win the Black Friday sales competition. Charlie challenges Gupta and Manmeet to a game of laser tag.
10	"Homesick to My Stomach"	John Putch	David Gross & Greg Lisbe	December 2, 2010	5.32
Todd gets homesick watching his friends on webcam do a tailgate party for their football team. He learns from Charlie that he can watch his favorite football team's game at a local restaurant that has satellite TV. Todd is seen wearing a custom Chief's football jersey, buys a coconut and pretends to score a touchdown. Asha spots him, they talk and he eats the street food she just bought. Asha reminds him he is not used to that kind of dirty food and gets sick before the football game. After a few visits to the toilet he is carried out of the office by Charlie to the restaurant with Manmeet. At the restaurant Todd misses the game spending much time in the toilet both sick and homesick. Rajiv assumes managerial control when Todd becomes ill from street food. Madhuri, Asha, Charlie, Manmeet and Gupta visit Todd after work to have a tailgating party of their own.
11	"A Sitar is Born"	John Scott	Geetika Lizardi	January 20, 2011	3.95
Todd overhears Madhuri sing in the bathroom and tries to coax her into singing in a local talent show. Gupta misunderstands Todd and volunteers himself as lead.
12	"Sari, Charlie"	Victor Nelli, Jr.	Luvh Rakhe	January 27, 2011	4.13
Charlie discovers Todd and Tonya's relationship when he catches them kissing. Corporate informs Rajiv that the employees will be reviewing him.
13	"Training Day"	Victor Nelli, Jr.	Pete Holmes	February 3, 2011	3.74
Todd rewards his workers with a retreat. Tonya tries to help Charlie find a date.
14	"The Todd Couple"	Reggie Hudlin	Amit Bhalla	February 10, 2011	3.61
Todd suspends Gupta from work after he becomes angry with callers. Manmeet tries to juggle two online Valentine's Day dates.
15	"Guess Who's Coming to Delhi"	Matt Shakman	Terry Mulroy	February 17, 2011	3.20
Todd is worried about how the workers will behave when his boss visits the call center. Charlie gets in trouble for being culturally insensitive.
16	"Take This Punjab and Shove It"	Dennie Gordon	Robert Borden	February 24, 2011	3.27
When an employee quits, Todd jumps on the opportunity to hire someone new, only to have his recruit poached by someone close to him. Gupta finds himself in financial trouble as a result of him moving out of his parents’ house into his own apartment, and must find a way to clear the dues.
17	"Todd's Holi War"	Victor Nelli, Jr.	Michael Pennie	March 17, 2011	3.59
Todd discovers another company is hogging the air conditioning, leaving Mid-American Novelties to suffer through the heatwave. Meanwhile, Rajiv struggles to find an original way to propose to his girlfriend.
18	"Gupta's Hit & Manmeet's Missus"	Troy Miller	Mark Torgrove & Paul A. Kaplan	March 24, 2011	3.61
Manmeet makes a video to send to his girlfriend Ashlynn in New York. Meanwhile, there is trouble between Gupta and Rajiv when Gupta accuses Rajiv of hitting him. World Wrestling Entertainment wrestler The Great Khali appears in a cameo.
19	"Charlie Curries a Favor From Todd"	Kevin Dowling	Linda Videtti Figueiredo	April 7, 2011	2.91
Todd hires Charlie to work for Mid America Novelties. Rajiv attempts a scam, to get money for his honeymoon.
20	"Mama Sutra"	Alex Hardcastle	Patrick Walsh & Sonny Lee	April 14, 2011	3.50
Tonya's mom comes to India and hooks up with Charlie while Todd and Tonya butt heads over Asha; Madhuri tells Gupta his lifeline is short, leading him to undergo a karmic cleanse.
21	"Rajiv Ties the Baraat (Part 1)"	Victor Nelli, Jr.	Michael Loftus	May 5, 2011	3.14
Todd throws Rajiv a bachelor party; Manmeet nervously awaits his American girlfriend's arrival.
22	"Rajiv Ties the Baraat (Part 2)"	Victor Nelli, Jr.	Story by : Charlie Hornsby; Teleplay by : Vera Santamaria	May 12, 2011	2.99
Rajiv worries the wedding may be called off, then considers doing so himself; Manmeet is not on the same relationship page as his girlfriend.

== International broadcast ==
Outsourced was picked up in Canada, for broadcast on Global at the same time as the American broadcast. In New Zealand, Outsourced has been broadcast on FOUR.

Outsourced has been broadcast in Singapore, Indonesia, Thailand, and Hong Kong on Universal. In Brazil, Outsourced has been broadcast on Rede Record, premiered on November 5, 2011, with the title Aprontando na Índia. It is also being broadcast on TBS. In Sweden, Outsourced has been broadcast on TV3 and TV6. In Poland, Outsourced (Dostawa na telefon) has been broadcast on Comedy Central Poland.

== Reception ==
The show received mixed reviews, reaching a 46 out of 100 on review aggregator Metacritic. Another review aggregator, Rotten Tomatoes, gives the show a rating of 21% based on 14 reviews, with the critical consensus, "This culture-clash sitcom is too mired in unfunny jokes and stereotypical characters to provide much insight into the global marketplace." Joel Keller of TV Squad in a review of the pilot episode stated, "As long as the show can examine the cultural divide, show how all offices are the same no matter where they are, and stay away from the easy jokes, NBC could have another Thursday comedy hit." Alessandra Stanley of The New York Times stated "The fact that it's neither embarrassing nor deeply offensive—once it gets rolling, the show is actually quite charming—is a credit to the cast and the writers." Critics such as blogger Mikey O'Connell have accused Outsourced of being racist. Matt Rouse of TV Guide wrote, "The culture clash premise drowns in a sewer of caricatures and lame jokes".

=== Awards and nominations ===
Awards and nominations for Outsourced
Year	Presenter	Award	Result
2011	People's Choice Awards	Favorite New TV Comedy	Nominated
2011	NAMIC Vision Awards	Best Performance - Comedy for Anisha Nagarajan	Nominated
2011	NAMIC Vision Awards	Comedy	Nominated

== See also ==
- Mumbai Calling, a 2007 British sitcom with a similar premise.
- Outsourced (film), a 2006 movie from which the TV show takes its inspiration.
