= Tom Gorai =

American film producer (born 1962)

Tom Gorai (born December 1962) is an American film producer, screenwriter, and director.

== Biography ==
Gorai was born in Seattle, Washington.

A graduate of Vassar College with a degree in Philosophy and Film, Tom Gorai is a veteran of the film and television industry.

He produced Arlington Road (1999) starring Jeff Bridges, Tim Robbins and Joan Cusack, Going All the Way featuring Jeremy Davies and Ben Affleck, and Outsourced with Josh Hamilton, Larry Pine and Ayesha Dharker, self-distributed by ShadowCatcher Entertainment and American Pastime starring Jon Gries and Gary Cole, distributed by Warner Home Video. He produced the "Bachelor Party Segment" for Cameron Crowe's Jerry Maguire.

Gorai has also worked with such musical artists as Pearl Jam, Nine Inch Nails, Alice in Chains, A Tribe Called Quest and Screaming Trees. In 1993, Pearl Jam's "Jeremy" video, produced by Gorai and directed by Mark Pellington, was awarded four MTV Video Music Awards, including Best Video of the Year. He has also been nominated for an Emmy and a Grammy.

Gorai has produced documentaries such as Father's Daze, for PBS, Single Video Theory, about the band Pearl Jam, and American Mullet for Chris Blackwell’s Palm Pictures.

In 2002, he joined Seattle based ShadowCatcher Entertainment. He currently splits his time between New York, Los Angeles and Seattle.

== Music video filmography (producer) ==
- "I Left My Wallet in El Segundo" - A Tribe Called Quest (1990)
- "Jeremy" - Pearl Jam (1992)
- "Rooster" - Alice in Chains (1993)
- "Midnight in Chelsea" - Jon Bon Jovi (1997)
- "We're in This Together" - Nine Inch Nails (1999)

== Filmography (producer) ==
- Solvent (2024) (executive producer)
- Hunting Bigfoot (2021)
- Nostalgia (2018)
- Keep on Keepin' On (2014)
- American Pastime (2007)
- Outsourced (2006)
- I'm Only Looking – The Best of INXS (2004) (segment "Beautiful Girl")
- New Best Friend (2002) (consulting producer)
- American Mullet (2001) (executive producer)
- No Maps for These Territories (2000) (executive producer)
- Going All the Way (1997)
- Destination Anywhere (1997)
- Pearl Jam: Single Video Theory (1998)
- Arlington Road (1999)
