= Outsourced (film) =

- Promotional poster for Outsourced
- Directed by: John Jeffcoat
- Written by: George Wing; John Jeffcoat
- Produced by: Tom Gorai
- Starring: Josh Hamilton; Ayesha Dharker; Asif Basra; Arjun Mathur; Siddarth Jadhav; Bhuvnesh Shetty
- Cinematography: Teodoro Maniaci
- Edited by: Brian Berdan
- Music by: BC Smith
- Distributed by: ShadowCatcher Entertainment
- Release date: September 12, 2006
- Running time: 103 minutes
- Country: United States
- Language: English
- Box office: $703,042 (worldwide)

Outsourced is a 2006 American romantic comedy film directed by John Jeffcoat and written by John Jeffcoat and George Wing.

== Plot ==
Todd Anderson (Josh Hamilton), a salesman for a Seattle novelty products company, learns he has to travel to India when his department is outsourced. Todd is not happy but when his boss Dave informs him that quitting would mean losing his stock options, he goes to train his Indian replacement Puro (Asif Basra).

When he arrives, Todd is frustrated with everything in the country where people call him "Mr. Toad". He has difficulty making the call center employees of Gharapuri understand what their American customers expect. He feels that he is never going to get the Minutes-per-Incident (MPI) under six minutes and so will never get to return to the United States.

Todd experiences the festival of Holi and with it, a sense of calm. At the call center the MPI slowly improves. He recognizes a leader in an employee Asha (Ayesha Dharker) and offers her the job of assisting Puro when Todd leaves. Todd tries to improve the workplace experience for the employees; when they tell him they would like some of the products they are selling, he decides to implement a rewards program and asks Dave for a shipment. Dave initially refuses, but when Todd manages to convince him that he is opening the products to a market of a billion people, Dave agrees to ship them overnight.

Asha realizes that the shipment has gone to another Gharapuri, an island. They both reach the island and get the shipment, but the boat that was supposed to ferry them back catches fire. With no resort, they check into a hotel, where Asha accuses Todd of being frivolous with Kali. They argue but end up having sex. Upon their return Asha informs Todd that she has been engaged to a family friend named Ashok since she was four years old. She says their affair could be only a "Holiday in Goa", a term for a short time spent with a lover before marrying another. Todd is confused but accepts the situation.

The call center MPI is nearing six when Dave calls to let Todd know that he needs to be picked up from the railway station. When Dave arrives, the power shuts down due to flooding, but the employees manage to set up their workstations on the roof and resume business. Dave is impressed, but when the employees go to the local bar to celebrate, Dave informs Todd the business is being shifted to China.

Todd informs the employees they have been fired, and Dave is erasing all data off their hard disks. Asha tells Todd that she has been writing a novel on her work computer called Holiday in Goa that needs to be saved. Todd gets the hint and they leave for Gaurav's (another employee's) house, where they spend time together. Todd refuses to go to China but suggests Puro as a replacement. Puro is seen leaving for China with his new wife.

Upon his return to the United States, Todd calls his mother to see about spending more time with her, a lesson he learned from Puro's aunt. Right afterwards, he gets a phone call from Asha just as the screen turns black and the end credits roll.

== Production ==
Principal photography took place in Mumbai from February 5 to March 13, 2006, followed by three days in Seattle from April 7–9, 2006. The film is based on an original screenplay by George Wing and writing partner, John Jeffcoat.

== Awards ==
- Bend Film Festival, Best Picture 2007
- Bollywood and Beyond Film Festival Audience Award 2007
- Cinequest Film Festival Audience Award, Best Feature Film 2007
- Dubai International Film Festival Official Selection 2006
- Goa International Film Festival Official Selection 2006
- Hardacre Film Festival Audience Award, Best Picture 2007
- Indian Film Festival of Los Angeles Audience Award 2007
- Mumbai International Film Festival Official Selection 2007
- Palm Springs Film Festival Best of the Fest 2007
- Palm Springs Film Festival John Schlesinger Award 2007
- Red Bank International Film Festival Official Selection 2007
- Seattle International Film Festival Golden Space Needle Award for Best Film 2007
- South Asian Film Festival, Maitland, FLA, Official Selection 2007
- South Asian Indian Film Festival, New York City, Official Selection 2007
- Toronto International Film Festival Official Selection 2006
- Vancouver International Film Festival Official Selection 2007

== Television adaptation ==
In October 2007, Variety reported that Ken Kwapis, who worked on the U.S. adaptation of The Office, had been approached by NBC to create a television pilot for a potential spinoff of Outsourced.

On May 16, 2010, NBC announced that the television adaptation would be a part of the network's fall 2010 lineup. Outsourced premiered on September 23, 2010 and ran for one season before being cancelled by NBC in May 2011.
