= American Mullet =

2001 film by Jennifer Arnold

- Directed by: Jennifer Arnold
- Written by: Jennifer Arnold
- Produced by: Jennifer Arnold; Tom Gorai
- Narrated by: Matthew Bose
- Cinematography: Patricia Lee
- Edited by: Jennifer Arnold; Zach Fine
- Music by: Adam Cohen
- Release date: January 1, 2001 (Sundance Film Festival)
- Running time: 52 minutes
- Country: United States
- Language: English

American Mullet (also known as The Mullet Chronicles) is a 2001 documentary film directed by Jennifer Arnold. The film documents the phenomenon of the mullet hairstyle and the people who wear it. Through their discussion of the mullet, the backgrounds of the people featured in the film are revealed.
