= Guru Singh =

American actor (born 1980)

- Born: Houston, Texas, US
- Occupation: Actor
- Years active: 2010-present

Gurpreet "Guru" Singh (born March 21, 1980) is an American actor.

Singh was born in Houston, Texas, where his Indian parents immigrated from Punjab, India. He was raised in Spring, Texas and went to Klein Forest High School. Later he graduated with a Bachelor of Arts in Acting from the University of Houston, where he also received a Bachelor of Business Administration in MIS. He currently resides in Los Angeles, California.

== Filmography ==
=== Television ===
Year	Title	Role	Notes
2010	Outsourced	Ajeet	22 Episodes
2012	GCB	Texan Doorman	
2013	Arrested Development	Jaideep	Episode: "Indian Takers"
2012–2014	Jimmy Kimmel Live!	Guru	Multiples Comedy Sketches
