= Dan Wakefield =

American novelist and journalist (1932–2024)

- Born: May 21, 1932; Indianapolis, Indiana, U.S.
- Died: March 13, 2024 (aged 91); Miami, Florida, U.S.
- Education: Columbia University
- Occupations: Novelist; journalist; screenwriter
- Writing career
- Notable works: Going All the Way (1970); Starting Over (1973); New York in the Fifties (1992)
- Website: danwakefield.com

Dan Wakefield (May 21, 1932 – March 13, 2024) was an American novelist, journalist, and screenwriter.

His novel Going All the Way (1970) was made into a feature film with Wakefield also writing the screenplay for Going All the Way

His novel Starting Over (1973), was made into the feature film, Starting Over (1979).

Wakefield created the NBC prime time television series James at 15 (1977–78), of which he was story editor (1977).

His other notable works include Island in the City: The World of Spanish Harlem (1959), a pioneering journalistic account of a Puerto Rican neighborhood in New York, and the memoir New York in the Fifties (2001), produced as a documentary film by Betsy Blankenbaker. His memoir, Returning: A Spiritual Journey (1988), was called by Bill Moyers "one of the most important memoirs of the spirit I have ever read". He edited and wrote the Introduction to Kurt Vonnegut Letters (2012). Wakefield received The Bernard DeVoto Fellowship at The Bread Loaf Writer Conference in 1958, a Nieman Fellowship in Journalism (1963–64) and a Rockefeller Grant in Writing, 1968.

== Early life and education ==
Dan Wakefield was born in Indianapolis, Indiana, where his family lived in the Broad Ripple neighborhood.

Wakefield went to Public School #80 and Shortridge High School, where he began his writing career as a sports columnist for the school newspaper, The Shortridge Daily Echo, and was the school's sports correspondent for The Indianapolis Star. He later became friends with fellow author Kurt Vonnegut, who attended Shortridge High School and worked on the same school paper 10 years before Wakefield. He worked summers during college in The Star sports department and as a general assignment reporter for The Grand Rapids Press.

Wakefield left Indianapolis in 1952 for New York City, where he graduated from Columbia College, with a B.A. with Honors in English, after having studied with the literary critics Mark Van Doren and Lionel Trilling, as well as the sociologist C. Wright Mills.

== Career ==
After college, Wakefield worked as a reporter at The Princeton Packet, New Jersey's oldest weekly, which he later left to become a research assistant for the sociologist C. Wright Mills, his professor at Columbia. His research duties left him time to begin his career as a freelance journalist, covering the Emmett Till murder trial in Mississippi for The Nation magazine. He continued to write for The Nation from Israel in 1956, becoming a staff writer for the magazine on his return the same year. He also published in periodicals such as Dissent, Commonweal, Commentary, New World Writing, Harpers, Esquire, The Atlantic, The Yoga Journal, GQ and TV Guide.

Wakefield was listed as a "sponsor" for the Fair Play for Cuba Committee in its manifesto.

On publication of his collection of articles and commentary Between The Lines (1966), The New York Times said he was "acknowledged to be one of the country's most perceptive and sensitive independent commentator-reporters". After his year as a Nieman Fellow, he moved to Beacon Hill in Boston, where he began writing for The Atlantic, writing the entire issue of the magazine for March 1968, called "Supernation at Peace and War", which then was published as a book. From 1968 to 1981 he was a contributing editor of The Atlantic).

In November 2011, Wakefield returned to Indianapolis to speak on a panel discussion of the work of Vonnegut at the Vonnegut Library and Museum . A month later, he moved back to Indianapolis permanently, thus contradicting Vonnegut's prediction in his review of Going All The Way in Life magazine: "Having written this book, Dan Wakefield will never be able to go back to Indianapolis. He will have to watch the 500 mile race on television".

After moving back, Wakefield was inducted into The Indianapolis Public Schools Hall of Fame, The Shortridge High School Hall of Fame, the Indy Reads Literacy Leaders Hall of Fame, and received a Cultural Vision Award from the news weekly NUVO. On June 1, 2016, the neighborhood park at 61st and Broadway Street in the Broad Ripple neighborhood of Indianapolis, Indiana, was renamed Dan Wakefield Park.

Wakefield taught writing at the University of Massachusetts at Boston, Emerson College, Boston University, The University of Illinois Journalism School and The Iowa Writers Workshop.

He edited and wrote the Introduction of the letters of his friend and fellow Shortridge High School graduate Kurt Vonnegut (Kurt Vonnegut Letters) as well as a collection of Vonnegut's graduation speeches and other related pieces (If This Isn't Nice, What Is?: Advice to the Young).

Wakefield retired as writer in residence at Florida International University (1995–2009), where he received The Faculty Award for Mentorship.

== Personal life ==
During college, Wakefield became an atheist and did not return to church until 1980 when he went to a Christmas Eve service at King's Chapel, a Unitarian Universalist congregation in Boston.

Wakefield said his philosophy of life was encompassed in a quote attributed to Philo, the ancient Egyptian philosopher: “Be kind, for everyone you know is fighting a great battle.”

Wakefield died in Miami on March 13, 2024, at the age of 91.

== Awards ==
- Nieman Fellowship in Journalism
- Bernard DeVoto Fellowship
- Rockefeller Grant for Creative Arts
- National Endowment for the Arts Grant

== Works ==
=== Books ===
- Island in the City (1959)
- Revolt in the South (1962)
- The Addict: An Anthology (1963)
- Between The Lines (1965)
- Supernation at Peace and War (1968)
- Going All The Way (1970)
- Starting Over (1973)
- All Her Children: The Making of a Soap Opera (1975)
- Home Free (1977)
- Under the Apple Tree (1982)
- Selling Out (1985)
- Returning: A Spiritual Journey (1988)
- The Story of Your Life: Writing a Spiritual Autobiography (1990)
- New York in the Fifties (1992)
- Expect a Miracle (1995)
- Creating from the Spirit (1996)
- How Do We Know When It's God? (1999)
- Releasing the Creative Spirit (2001)
- Spiritually Incorrect: Finding God in All the Wrong Places (2003)
- The Hijacking of Jesus: How the Religious Right Distorts Christianity and Promotes Prejudice and Hate (2006)
- If This Isn't Nice, What Is?: Advice to the Young (2014)
- Editor, Kurt Vonnegut Letters (2012)
- Editor, If This Isn't Nice What Is? Vonnegut's Graduation Speeches (2013)
- Editor, Complete Stories by Kurt Vonnegut (2017)

=== Films and television ===
- Creator/consultant, James at 15 (1977)
- Writer/co-producer, The Seduction of Miss Leona (1980)
- Writer, Going All the Way (1997)
