= Going All the Way =

- Theatrical release poster
- Directed by: Mark Pellington
- Screenplay by: Dan Wakefield
- Based on: Going All the Way by Dan Wakefield
- Produced by: Tom Gorai; Sigurjón Sighvatsson; Tom Rosenberg
- Starring: Jeremy Davies; Ben Affleck; Amy Locane; Rachel Weisz; Rose McGowan; Jill Clayburgh; Lesley Ann Warren
- Cinematography: Bobby Bukowski
- Edited by: Leo Trombetta
- Music by: tomandandy
- Production companies: PolyGram Filmed Entertainment; Lakeshore Entertainment
- Distributed by: Gramercy Pictures
- Release date: 19 September 1997 (United States)
- Running time: 103 minutes
- Country: United States
- Language: English
- Box office: $113,069

Going All the Way is a 1997 American comedy-drama film directed by Mark Pellington, in his feature film directorial debut. The film was written by Dan Wakefield, based on his 1970 novel and stars Jeremy Davies, Ben Affleck, Amy Locane, Rachel Weisz and Rose McGowan.

== Plot ==
Two young men, Sonny Burns and Gunner Casselman, return home to Indianapolis after serving time in the US Army's 7th Infantry Division during the Korean War. The quiet Sonny served as a private from a Public Information posting in Kansas City, and the confident Gunner as a highly decorated (Note: Shown onscreen, in the opening minutes, wearing service ribbons for the Silver Star, Legion of Merit, Soldier's Medal, Purple Heart and others) corporal from the Korea combat zone. Back in civilian life, they search for love and fulfillment in middle America during the conservative 1950s.

== Cast ==
- Jeremy Davies as Sonny Burns
- Ben Affleck as Gunner Casselman
- Amy Locane as Buddy Porter
- Rachel Weisz as Marty Pilcher
- Rose McGowan as Gale Ann Thayer
- John Lordan as Elwood Burns
- Bob Swan as Luke
- Jill Clayburgh as Alma Burns
- Lesley Ann Warren as Nina Casselman
- Nick Offerman as Wilks (in his feature film debut)

In addition, Dan Wakefield, the film's screenwriter (adapting his semi-autobiographical novel), has a brief cameo as an unnamed farmer at a church service. (Note: "What are you looking for, boy?")

== Production notes ==
The film was shot on location in Indianapolis, Indiana, the setting of Dan Wakefield's semi-autobiographical novel of the same name.

The film premiered at the 1997 Sundance Film Festival; Rose McGowan, who attended to promote the film, has alleged that Harvey Weinstein raped her while at the festival that year.

== Soundtrack ==
The Original Motion Picture Soundtrack was released on Verve Records in September 1997 (Verve 314 537 908-2) including the song "Tangled and Tempted", co-written for the film by Indianapolis singer/songwriter/producer Tim Brickley.

== Reception ==
=== Box office ===
The film – which received a limited theatrical release, peaking with 17 theatres – grossed $113,069 at the domestic box office.

=== Critical response ===
On the review aggregator website Rotten Tomatoes, 65% of 23 critics' reviews are positive, with an average rating of 6.2/10. The website's consensus reads: "Its themes may feel overly familiar, but Going All the Way is set apart from other period coming-of-age films by the strength of its performances." Metacritic, which uses a weighted average, assigned the film a score of 57 out of 100, based on 16 critics, indicating "mixed or average" reviews.

Stephen Holden of The New York Times did not care for the film, especially Pellington's direction: "When a filmmaker feels compelled to pump up a story through caricature and expressionistic visual tricks, it's usually a sign of distrust in the inherent drama of the material. In Going All the Way, a flashy movie adaptation of Dan Wakefield's popular 1970 novel about growing up in the heartland in the repressed 1950s, Mark Pellington, a director from the world of music video, has inflated a realistic memoir into a garish, hyperkinetic social satire." Roger Ebert of The Chicago Sun-Times gave the film 3 out of 4 stars, and called it "a deeper, cleverer film than it first seems. Much of its strength depends on the imploding performance of Jeremy Davies."

== Awards and recognition ==
Going All the Way was nominated for two awards at the 1997 Sundance Film Festival, winning a "Special Recognition" for production designer Thérèse DePrez.

== Director's edit ==
A re-edit of the film was released in 2022, called Going All the Way: The Director's Edit. According to the announcement, "the new cut of the 1997 film was rescanned for 4K and features 50 additional minutes of never-before-seen footage. A new title sequence was also created by Sergio Pinheiro, along with 50 minutes of music from composer Pete Adams." Pellington says "this definitive edition of the film feels like a completely different, more character-driven and psychologically complex vision. It is a darker movie, but also far more sensitive and, ultimately, uplifting."
