= List of games that Buddha would not play =

This is a list of games that Gautama Buddha is reputed to have said that he would not play and that his disciples should likewise not play, because he believed them to be a 'cause for negligence'. This list dates from the 6th or 5th century BC and is the earliest known list of games.

There is some debate about the translation of some of the games mentioned, and the list given here is based on the translation by T. W. Rhys Davids of the Brahmajāla Sutta and is in the same order given in the original. The list is duplicated in a number of other early Buddhist texts, including the Vinaya Pitaka.

1. Games on boards with 8 or 10 rows. This is thought to refer to ashtapada and dasapada respectively; however, later Sinhala commentaries refer to these boards also being used with games involving dice.
2. The same games played on imaginary boards. Akasam astapadam was an ashtapada variant played with no board, literally "astapadam played in the sky". A correspondent in the American Chess Bulletin identifies this as likely the earliest literary mention of a blindfold chess variant.
3. Games of marking diagrams on the floor such that the player can only walk on certain places. This is described in the Vinaya Pitaka as "having drawn a circle with various lines on the ground, there they play avoiding the line to be avoided". Rhys Davids suggests that it may refer to parihāra-patham, a form of hop-scotch.
4. Games where players either remove pieces from a pile or add pieces to it, with the loser being the one who causes the heap to shake (similar to the modern game pick-up sticks).
5. Games of throwing dice.
6. Dipping the hand with the fingers stretched out in lac, or red dye, or flour-water, and striking the wet hand on the ground or on a wall, calling out "What shall it be?" and showing the form required—elephants, horses, etc..
7. Ball games.
8. Blowing through a pat-kulal, a toy pipe made of leaves.
9. Ploughing with a toy plough.
10. Playing with toy windmills made from palm leaves.
11. Playing with toy measures made from palm leaves.
12. Playing with toy carts.
13. Playing with toy bows.
14. Guessing at letters traced with the finger in the air or on a friend's back. (letters in the Brahmi script)
15. Guessing a friend's thoughts.
16. Imitating deformities.

Although the modern game of chess had not been invented at the time the list was made, earlier chess-like games such as chaturaji may have existed. H. J. R. Murray refers to Rhys Davids' 1899 translation, noting that the 8×8 board game is most likely ashtapada while the 10×10 game is dasapada. He states that both are race games.

== Occurrences in the Pali Canon ==
The complete list is repeated several times in the Digha Nikaya as part of a passage called 'The Intermediate Section on Moral Discipline' that details ways in which the Buddha and his followers differ in their practices from brahmins and other ascetics.

- Brahmajāla Sutta (DN 1)
- Sāmaññaphala Sutta (DN 2)
- Ambaṭṭha Sutta (DN 3)
- Soṇadaṇḍa Sutta (DN 4)
- Kūṭadanta Sutta (DN 5)
- Mahāli Sutta (DN 6)
- Jāliya Sutta (DN 7)
- Mahāsīhanāda Sutta (DN 8)
- Subha Sutta (DN 10)
- Kevaṭṭa Sutta (DN 11)
- Tevijja Sutta (DN 13)

The full list also occurs twice in the Vinaya Pitaka: once in the Suttavibhanga as part of the criteria for a rule entailing suspension, and once in the Cullavaga as part of a technical discussion regarding the procedure for banishing monks from an area.

An abbreviated version also occurs in at least two other sutras: the Upāli Sutta in the Anguttara Nikaya and the Mahātaṇhāsaṅkhaya Sutta in the Majjhima Nikaya.

== See also ==
- History of Buddhism
- Traditional games of South Asia
  - Kabaddi, a game believed to have been played by Buddha
- Timeline of chess
- History of games
- List of chess variants
