= Jane Wants a Boyfriend =

- Theatrical release poster
- Directed by: William C. Sullivan
- Written by: Jarret Kerr
- Produced by: Lauren Rachel Brady
- Starring: Louisa Krause; Eliza Dushku; Gabriel Ebert; Amir Arison
- Cinematography: Brandon Roots
- Edited by: Casey O'Donnell
- Music by: Nathan Matthew David
- Production company: Copperline Creative
- Distributed by: Orion Pictures; FilmBuff
- Release dates: November 11, 2015 (Napa Valley Film Festival); March 25, 2016 (United States)
- Running time: 101 minutes
- Country: United States
- Language: English

Jane Wants a Boyfriend is a 2015 American romantic comedy drama film directed by William C. Sullivan and written by Jarret Kerr. Starring Louisa Krause, Eliza Dushku, Gabriel Ebert, and Amir Arison, the film follows Jane, a woman with Asperger syndrome who is searching for a boyfriend with the help of her older sister, Bianca.

Jane Wants a Boyfriend premiered at the Napa Valley Film Festival on November 11, 2015, and was theatrically released in the United States on March 25, 2016, to negative reviews from critics.

== Synopsis ==
Jane is a young woman diagnosed with Asperger syndrome who is living with her parents in Queens, New York. She works as a costume designer at the theatre that Bianca (her protective older sister) is acting in, playing Titania in A Midsummer Night's Dream. After moving into Brooklyn with her fiancé, Rob (a field journalist), Bianca learns on Jane's birthday that their parents are moving to New Jersey and want Jane to move in with Bianca. Although Jane agrees, Bianca and Rob are hesitant; they throw a housewarming party and invite her to distract her from the issue. At the party, Jane talks to Jack, an old friend of Bianca and Rob's who works as a sous-chef at a high-end restaurant. Although Jack is known for casual flings, they hit it off, and Jack is unaware that Jane has autism. Bianca finds them and splits them up, telling Jack to stay away from her sister. Jane and Bianca fight, Jane's growing desire for independence conflicting with Bianca's overprotective tendencies and her view of Jack as too unreliable.

The next morning, Bianca tells her friend Cynthia that Jane confided in her that she wants a boyfriend, and Cynthia suggests someone she knows from the bank she works at who they "only give the easy stuff" as a first date. Bianca meets Jane in the costuming department at the theatre and tells her to head to her apartment to pick out something nice for herself so they can have lunch. Around the same time, Rob gets an urgent call from Jack at work to meet up with him, so he agrees to meet with him in an hour. Back with Jane and Bianca at lunch, Jane gets frustrated that Bianca and Rob don't want her to move in with them, but Bianca deflects by bringing up that she found her a date. Jane is elated, and Bianca says they "have a lot in common" and lets Jane keep the dress she chose from Bianca's wardrobe for the date. At a bar, Jack asks Rob to help set him up with Jane, excited about the connection they made at the party despite Bianca's warning. Rob is taken aback, says he can't go behind Bianca's back after she told Jack to stay away, especially with the news he just received from his boss: he's been promoted to be a foreign correspondent. Jack congratulates him, but continues to push Rob to give him Jane's number. Rob pushes back, finally telling him that Jane is autistic. Jack, shocked, asks why neither of them had ever told him, and Rob says he didn't want to tell him about Bianca's "retarded" sister. Jack's disgusted by the language, but Rob warns Jack of Jane's demeanor and idiosyncrasies, asking him if he still wants Jane's phone number.

At work that night, Jack's distracted thinking about the conversation he had with Rob, and at closing time he talks with his friend José about the time and care it takes to make 'soup', an analogy for understanding someone like Jane. On the night of Jane's date, Bianca helps her get ready, Jane preparing herself even as she waits at the restaurant. Jane's date, Steven, is not the handsome banker that she envisioned and becomes irritated at his tardiness, self-centeredness and their lack of chemistry. At her parents' house, her dad picks up a call from Jack (Rob having given him Jane's home number) who tells him Jane's on a date. Jane, becoming more and more overstimulated by the restaurant in her frustration with Steven hastily tries to leave, but as Steven tries to stop her, they create a mess in the scramble. Bianca and Cynthia (hiding at the bar) rush over to help, Bianca helping her calm down while Cynthia gets the check. Jane runs away from the scene, and when Bianca gives chase to catch her, Jane accuses Bianca of spying on her. Bianca defends herself by reminding Jane of how the date went and how Jane handled it. Jane argues that the date didn't go well because Bianca set her up with someone who she had nothing in common with, claiming that the only things Bianca thought they had in common were that they were both lonely and "a little slow". She tells Bianca she thinks that she doesn't want Jane to live with her and Rob because she wants to forget about her, and Bianca acknowledges that she made a big mistake in setting Jane up with Steven, but tells her that the world isn't like the old movies that she loves to watch. Jane runs off again and Bianca, heading back to the apartment, lets Rob know that the date didn't go well. Rob reluctantly tells her about his promotion.

At rehearsal the next day, Bianca gets a call from her mom about how Jane doesn't seem like herself. Bianca doesn't tell their mom about the date, saying she doesn't know why Jane would be upset. Jane's dad picks up another call at the house from Jack, this time with Jane there to answer. With Jane ecstatic, they set up a date on the same night as Bianca's opening show. Jack comes to her house with a bouquet of flowers, and he takes her out to the restaurant that he works at. On the way there they chat and joke, and he reveals that he called in a favor with his boss and got the whole restaurant for themselves for the night. Jack tells her he can make anything she wants to eat from the menu, but she decides that they'll share her favorite food: a grilled cheese.

At the show, Bianca sees Jack and Jane sitting next to each other in the audience but tries to continue to play in the scene. Jack tries to hold Jane's hand during the show but overcome with the physical contact she exits the row, Jack following behind. Bianca sees this just in time for her to go backstage, and she is clearly frustrated by what she saw. Jack finds Jane upstairs where the spotlights are and asks her to come back down. Jane tells him to go away, but Jack lets her know that he understands why she was overstimulated, and that he did his own reading about autism after what Rob told him. Jane believes he thinks she's weird, but Jack comforts her in letting her know he likes her just as she is, and he only did research to understand her and support her. Not wanting to go back down to the show, Jane takes him to the costume department. Bianca, backstage, listens to the show as it plays out and thinks about her connection to Jane and her attitude towards her. In the costume department, Jane shows Jack around and surprises him by changing into a beautiful dress that she made from costume scraps that others didn't want. Jack, taken with her, tells her she looks beautiful. Jane confesses that she wanted to tell him about her autism at the party where they connected before Bianca came, but that she didn't want him to think less of her, citing a memory from when she was a kid of a boy who wanted to kiss her that changed his mind after his friends told him about it. Jack, saying he is not that boy, kisses Jane.

The opening night ends, Bianca receives sparkling remarks from the show's director, and (looking for Jane after the show) finds her and Jack on stage in the empty theatre, laughing and holding hands. Bianca meets Rob and Cynthia in the back, Rob trying to apologize for connecting Jack and Jane, but Bianca hugs him and thanks him. Waiting for Jack and Jane in the lobby of the theatre, Bianca surprises them by saying that "she comes in peace". Jack congratulates her on the show and her acting, and heads outside to wait for Jane as Bianca asks to talk to her alone. They both apologize for the things they said the last time they saw each other. Jane asks if Bianca's going to berate her for meeting with Jack, and Bianca cries, apologizing for being so controlling and holding on to the idea she had of Jane from childhood as someone who needs protecting. She acknowledges how independent she is and also confides in her about her own fears of change as Rob will have to leave soon for his new job. Jane says that she can stay with Bianca in the meantime to keep her company, which Bianca graciously accepts. They embrace, and Jane gives Bianca one last look before leaving the theatre.

== Cast ==
- Louisa Krause as Jane, a wardrobe worker whose Asperger's syndrome causes background sounds to overload her senses
- Eliza Dushku as Bianca, Jane's older sister, whose worrying manifests as a controlling streak
- Gabriel Ebert as Jack, a guy who, despite being known as immature, does secret research on autism spectrum disorders
- Amir Arison as Rob
- Anisha Nagarajan as Cynthia
- Polly Draper as Mom
- Gregg Edelman as Dad
- Jon Bass as Steve
- Nick Stevenson as Director
- Greg Keller as Paul
- Franco Gonzalez as Jose

== Production ==
Nathan Matthew David composed the film score.

== Release ==
A trailer was released in June 2015.

Jane Wants a Boyfriend had its world premiere on November 11, 2015 at the Napa Valley Film Festival, and screened in theaters in the U.S. from March 25, 2016.

== Reception ==
On Rotten Tomatoes, the film has an approval rating of 38% based on 8 reviews.
