= ShadowCatcher Entertainment =

Independent film production company

ShadowCatcher Entertainment is an independent film production company that develops, produces and arranges financing for character-driven feature films, long-form television, and stage productions for the worldwide entertainment markets.

Based in Seattle with an office in New York City, the company collaborates with studios, independent film producers, commercial theaters and not-for-profit theaters in order to produce a wide variety of programming for all ages. ShadowCatcher distributed the film Outsourced theatrically and in home video, and also successfully sold Outsourced as a television show to NBC.

== Personnel ==
- David Skinner, executive producer – owner and manager, responsible for the company's strategic and financial planning as well as the development, financing and production of the company's film and stage projects
- Tom Gorai, producer – responsible for attracting and developing many of the company's feature film projects; lead producer for Outsourced and a producer on The American Pastime
- Norman Stephens, producer – independent producer working out of Reno, Nevada and Los Angeles who now focuses on independent television, cable movies and theatrical films.

== Company history ==
ShadowCatcher produced its first major film in 1997, the award-winning Smoke Signals, purchased and distributed by Miramax. In 1998, ShadowCatcher produced The Book of Stars and Getting to Know You, both of which were distributed worldwide. In 2002, ShadowCatcher invested in the successful Broadway revival of Frankie and Johnnie in the Clair de Lune and took an associate producer role in two successful off-Broadway shows, Debbie Does Dallas: The Musical and Tuesdays with Morrie.

ShadowCatcher's producing credits include The Skeleton Key, the 2004 Broadway production of Fiddler on the Roof, Michael Hoffman's 2006 film Game Six, and Match, starring Frank Langella, Ray Liotta and Jane Adams. They have entered into an agreement with Lydia Pilcher to adapt Alice Hoffman’s novel The Probable Future.
