= If This Isn't Nice, What Is?: Advice to the Young =

Collection of nine commencement speeches from Kurt Vonnegut

- First edition cover
- Editor: Dan Wakefield
- Author: Kurt Vonnegut
- Publisher: Seven Stories Press
- Publication date: 2013

If This Isn't Nice, What Is?: Advice to the Young (Seven Stories Press) is a 2013 collection of nine commencement speeches from Kurt Vonnegut, selected and introduced by longtime friend and author Dan Wakefield.

After the publication of his novel Slaughterhouse-Five brought him worldwide acclaim in 1969, Kurt Vonnegut became one of America's most popular graduation speakers. "We are performing animals," he used to say somewhat sardonically.

In 2016, Seven Stories Press released what it called a "(much) expanded second edition" of the book.

In 2020, Penguin Random House published a third edition, the first in paperback: If This Isn't Nice, What Is? (Even More) Expanded Third Edition: The Graduation Speeches and Other Words To Live By. There are three new speeches: “the anti-war Moratorium Day speech he gave in Barnstable, Massachusetts, in October 1969, a 1970 speech to Bennington College recommending ‘skylarking,’ and a 1974 speech to Hobart and William Smith Colleges about the importance of extended families in an age of loneliness.” There are fourteen speeches in all (11 at colleges; the Indiana Civil Liberties Union speech; the speech when he received the Carl Sandburg Award; and the anti-war speech he gave months after the publication of Slaughterhouse-Five). Related personal essays bring this edition to 18 chapters.

== The Speeches and Essays (Third Edition) ==
1. What To Do When You Have the Power; In the Meantime, Remember to Skylark! Bennington College, Bennington, Vermont, June 1970
2. The Terrible Disease of Loneliness Can Be Cured. Hobart and William Smith Colleges, Geneva, New York, May 26, 1974
3. Let the Killing Stop. Barnstable High School, Barnstable, Massachusetts, October 23, 1969
4. How to Make Money and Find Love! Fredonia College, Fredonia, New York, May 20, 1978
5. Advice to Graduating Women (That All Men Should Know). Agnes Scott College, Decatur, Georgia, May 15, 1999
6. How to Have Something Most Billionaires Don't. Rice University, Houston, Texas, October 12, 2001
7. How Music Cures Our Ills (And There Are Lots Of Them). Eastern Washington University, Spokane, Washington, April 17, 2004
8. What the "Ghost Dance" of the Native Americans and the French Painters Who Led the Cubist Movement Have In Common. The University of Chicago, Chicago, Illinois, February 17, 1994
9. How I Learned From a Teacher What Artists Do. Syracuse University, Syracuse, New York, May 8, 1994
10. Don't Forget Where You Come From. Butler University, Indianapolis, Indiana, May 11, 1996
11. Why Social Justice Does More Than Art To Nourish the American Dream. State University of New York, Albany, New York, May 20, 1972
12. How To Be A Wise Guy or Wise Girl. Southampton College, Southampton, New York, June 7, 1981
13. Why You Can't Stop Me From Speaking Ill of Thomas Jefferson. The Indiana Civil Liberties Union (now The American Civil Liberties Union of Indiana, Indianapolis, Indiana, September 16, 2000
14. Don't Despair If You Never Went to College! Carl Sandburg Award, Chicago, Illinois, October 12, 2001
15. How I Got My First Job As A Reporter and Learned To Write In A Simple, Direct Way, While Not Getting A Degree In Anthropology. From An Unsentimental Education: Writers and Chicago, University of Chicago Press, 1995
16. Somebody Should Have Told Me Not To Join A Fraternity. If I Knew Then What I Know Now: Advice To the Class of ‘94 from Thise Who Know Best, Cornell Magazine, May 1994
17. The Most Censored Writer Of His Time Defends the First Amendment. The Idea Killers, Playboy Magazine, January 1984
18. My Dog Likes Everybody, But Was Not Inspired By Ancient Greece and Rome or the Renaissance. Why My Dog Is Not A Humanist, The Humanist, November/December 1992
