= Thushari Jayasekera =

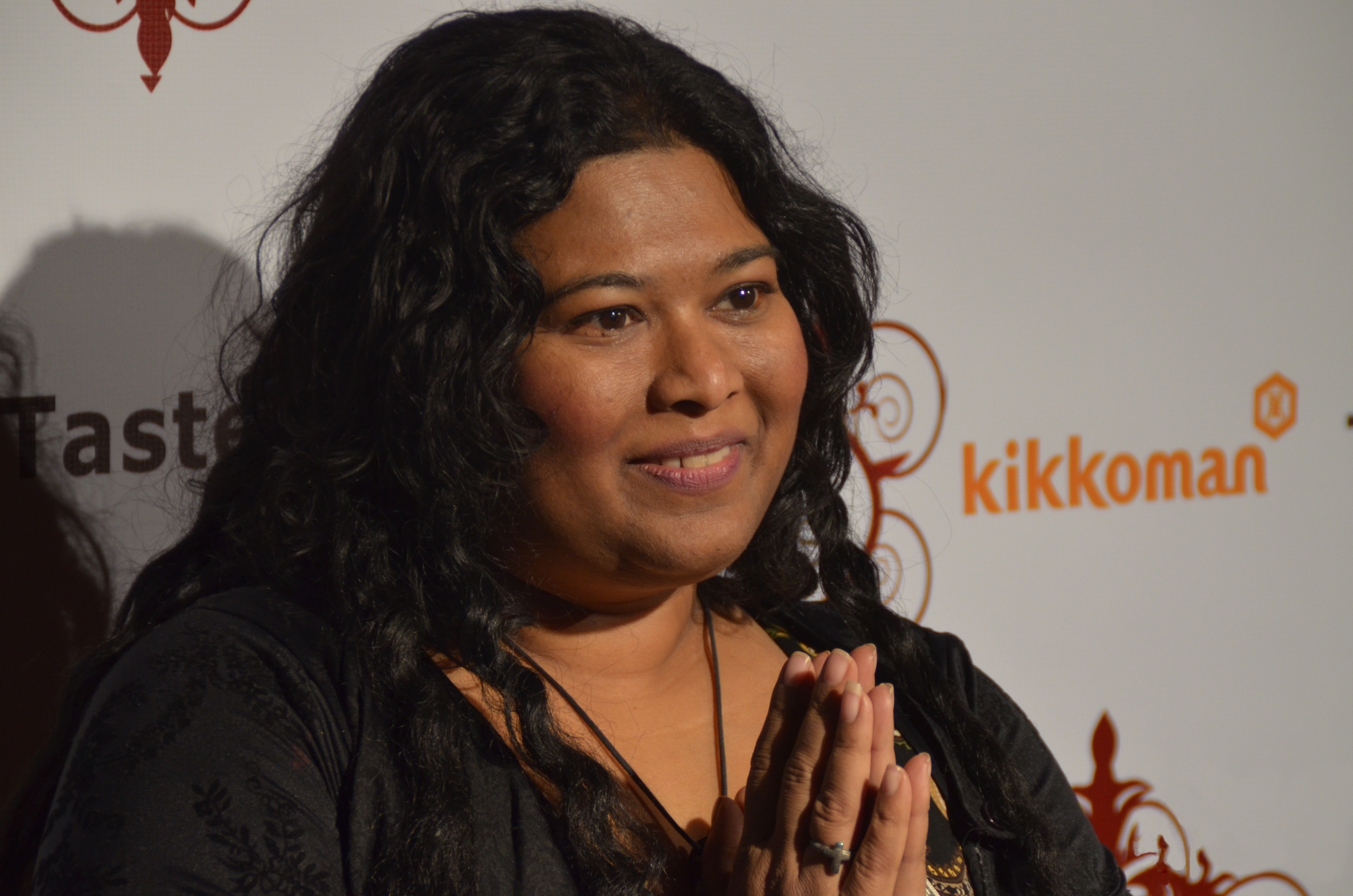
- Thushari Jayasekera at the 6th Annual Taste Awards
- Born: January 1984 (age 42); Sri Lanka

Thushari Jayasekera is a Sri Lankan-American actress, performer, and writer.

== Biography ==
Jayasekera is an American actress of South Asian origin. She was born in Sri Lanka, then moved with her parents to the United States, and grew up in California.

She was always drawn to performing and writing. She wrote skits and monologues for herself and friends to perform. She wrote, and still writes, poetry, and questions serious situations in the world and writes little solutions. She has acted in independent films such as The Yal Devi and Man Without a Head. She has appeared in American and Sri Lankan-American stage productions, including as a female lead in the dramas Parasthawa and Doopatha, presented by the Drama Circle of California.

Jayasekera has created several independent projects for public broadcast like Original Recipe, a variety show with skits, interviews, and music. SHe also created Jelly Noose, a blog that delivers non-urgent news around town with a Sri Lankan American flavour. She launched a mini-zine titled Apsara which highlights the South Asian community.

Currently, she writes and performs original performance arts pieces using words, dance and movement. A well known piece is one in which she uses actual rain as a metaphor. She also writes poetry and short stories. She is an announcer/emcee at festivals and events in Southern California. She is known for her acting, volunteering, community outreach work and outspokenness.

Her breakthrough role in prime-time television was Pinky on NBC Universal network's sitcom Outsourced from 2010 to 2011.

== Activities ==
Jayasekera volunteered with Rain Bird Corporation to decorate their Rose Parade floats. In 2003, her suggestion "Water Wonderland" was picked for the title of that year's award-winning float.

In November 2006, she visited Sri Lanka for the first time after living in the US. She was invited to entertain at a local Housewives Association's Annual Christmas Event. "Even though I was not a Mrs. yet, I was invited to be Mrs. Clause and announce/emcee at the event. I was recommended by a lady who has seen me act in a play in the U.S., I was really excited and it was so cool. Also, interacting with people who live life in Lanka helped me understand their condition a little better, I talked to anyone who would talk to me from the 3 wheeler drivers, security guards, students, soldiers on leave, store clerks, and the potential of the country is tremendous, only if they choose to exercise that potential..." She participates in rallies to create awareness for fair labor practices for unions.

== Highlights ==
- Featured in the Shine on Hollywood Magazine, May 2013
- Named an ambassador for Rainforest Rescue's Lanka Conservation programs, April 2013

== Film and television ==
Key
| † | Denotes films that have not yet been released |

| Year | Title | Role | Notes |
|---|---|---|---|
| 2009 | Yal Devi | Savithri | Feature length |
| 2010 | Almost Kings | High school student | |
| 2010 | Red Princess Blues | Strawberry Mary | Short film |
| 2010 | Hollywood Wasteland | Birthday Party Guest | TV series |
| 2010-11 | Outsourced | Pinky | 22 episodes, NBCUniv sitcom |
| 2011 | Isolation | Diner Customer | |
| 2011 | Oy Vey | Ally | |
| 2013 | Moonbound24: The Web Series | BabyLoon | |
| 2013 | Arrested Development | Bus Passenger | Episode 4.3, "Indian Takers", Netflix |
| 2013 | The Secret Lives of Dorks | Girl in Diner | |
| 2013 | Mr. Sophistication | Comedy Club Patron / Party Guest | |
| 2013 | The Visitor from Planet Omicron | Indian News Anchor | |
| 2013 | The Extra | Female Pedestrian | |
| 2016 | Man Without a Head † | Hummer at Barum | Post-production |

- Moonbound24, 2016 Doughboy Films (BabyLoon)
- Don't Trust the B— in Apartment 23, 2011 ABC, FOX (executive assistant)
- The Original Recipe 2006 (creator)

== Audiobooks ==
- Love Marriage: A Novel, 2012, Audible Inc.

== Stage plays ==
- 2009 Ramayana - adapted for children
- 2008 - Sketch Comedy
- 2007 - Doopatha
- 2006 - Dolige Sihinaya
- Stye of the Eye (Durang Durang) with the Actor's Collective at the Underground Theater
- Duty First
- 2005 - Parasthawa, Muwan Pellessa (stage drama in Los Angeles)

== Presenter ==
- Golden Raspberry Awards 2016
- Golden Raspberry Awards 2015
- Golden Raspberry Awards 2014
- Golden Raspberry Awards 2013
- Golden Raspberry Awards 2012

== Web series/webisodes ==
- Moonbound 24
- Hollywood Wasteland
- Double Cross

== Performance art, sketch, animation, dance and movement ==
Jayasekera creates her own performance arts pieces and creates experimental mini story projects online.

- Girl on the Sidewalk
- Laila Light
- Buzz Killers
- The Biachchi Show
- Jelly Jam
- Kundumani-Dance & Movement
- Tears in the Rain
- Talk It Out
