= Vanaja (film) =

- Theatrical poster
- Directed by: Rajnesh Domalpalli
- Written by: Rajnesh Domalpalli
- Produced by: Latha R. Domalapalli
- Starring: Mamatha Bhukya
- Cinematography: Milton Kam
- Edited by: Rajnesh Domalpalli; Robert Q. Lovett
- Music by: Indira Amperiani; Bhaskara S. Narayanan
- Distributed by: Emerging Pictures (US)
- Release date: 11 September 2006
- Running time: 111 minutes
- Countries: India; United States
- Language: Telugu

Vanaja is a 2006 Telugu-language drama film written and directed by Rajnesh Domalpalli on a story that constituted his Master of Fine Arts thesis at Columbia University. The film was made on a shoestring budget using a cast of non-professional first-timers for two and a half months.

The film stars Mamatha Bhukya as the title character: a 15-year-old daughter of a poor fisherman set in the backdrop of a rustic state of Andhra Pradesh in Southern India. She learns Kuchipudi, a classical Indian dance form, while being employed at a local landlady's house. All seems to be going well for her until sexual chemistry evolves between her and the landlady's son, and this eventually leads her being raped by him. The ensuing pregnancy disrupts her simple life, and she must choose how to deal with the child.

Vanaja was screened at several international festivals such as the Toronto International Film Festival and the Berlin International Film Festival, among others. It was nominated for the Diesel Discovery Award at the former and won the Best First Feature award at the latter. Beside this, it won several jury prizes at other film festivals, and was nominated for the Best First Feature and Best Cinematography awards at the Independent Spirit Awards. Vanaja found favour with many international critics as well. Roger Ebert ranked it among the five best foreign language films of 2007. It runs for 111 minutes in with subtitles in English.

== Plot ==
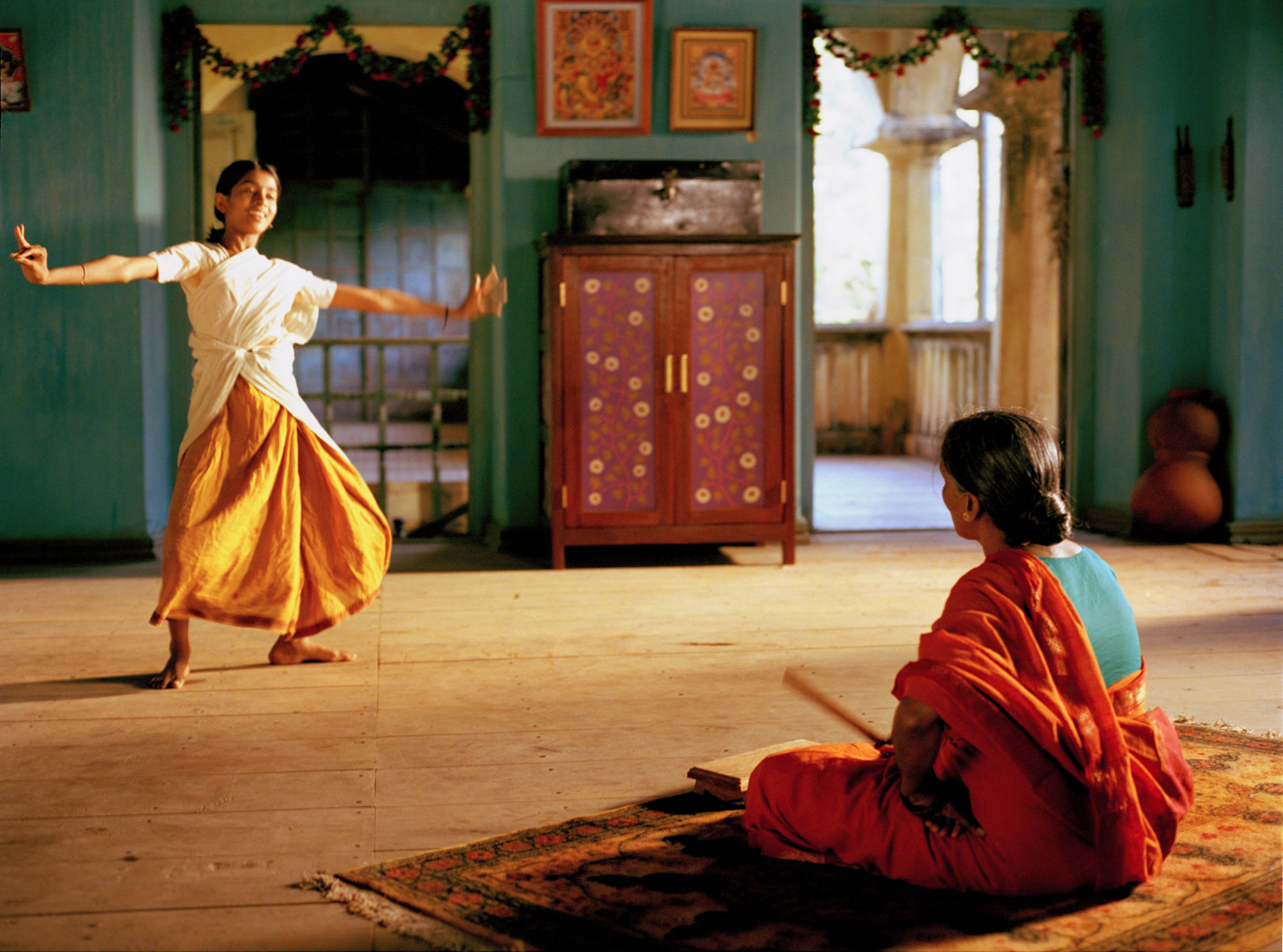
Vanaja dances a Kuchipudi Jati (short sequence set to a staccatto beat) from Rama Devi.

Vanaja is the 15-year-old daughter of Somayya, a poor, low caste fisherman from rural Andhra Pradesh. Somayya struggles to support his family due to dwindling catches at sea and mounting debts. One day, Vanaja and her teenage friend Lacchi watch a theatrical performance by a former Kuchipudi (a native classical Indian dance form) great, Rama Devi. The sequence of events lead to a soothsayer predicting to Vanaja that she will be a great dancer. With permission from her father, she goes to work in the house of the local landlady Rama Devi with the hope of learning Kuchipudi. While she is employed as a farmhand, she is entrusted with tending the chickens. When she gets caught playfully chasing them, she lies to conceal her pranks. Her vivaciousness and spunk soon catch the landlady's eye. To keep her out of trouble, Rama Devi soon promotes her to a kitchen underhand where she meets Rama Devi's cook, the old, crusty, and extremely loyal Radhamma.

After settling down at the landlady's house, Vanaja gets invited to play a game of ashta chamma (a leisurely game in rural towns of Andhra Pradesh) against the landlady. Knowing that losing isn't the mistress's forte, she deliberately gives up her game. This gesture, in turn, eventually secures her the landlady's mentorship, first in music and then in dance. Vanaja excels at these art forms and seems to be on a steadily ascending path until the arrival of Shekhar, the landlady's 23-year-old son, from the United States. Shekhar is a handsome, muscular young man who is running for an office in the local government. Sexual chemistry is ignited between Shekhar and Vanaja (still a minor at 15) when flirtation and sexual innuendo bloom.

In the meanwhile, her father's fishing boat is taken away by creditors. He sinks into a state of sadness and begins to drink away their savings. On one occasion, Vanaja's superior intellect pits her against Shekhar in a public incident which ultimately humiliates him in front of his mother. Matters escalate, and one day Vanaja is raped by Shekhar. She eventually loses her job when she becomes pregnant. She gives birth to a boy, much against Rama Devi's wishes who would have liked her to abort the foetus. Vanaja hopes that the physical evidence of the child will be proof of the rape and that somehow Shekhar will be brought to justice. However, Shekhar has no desire to marry Vanaja because she is from a lower caste. In the end, Rama Devi and Shekhar gain possession of the child, who will grow up to be an upper caste boy.

== Cast ==
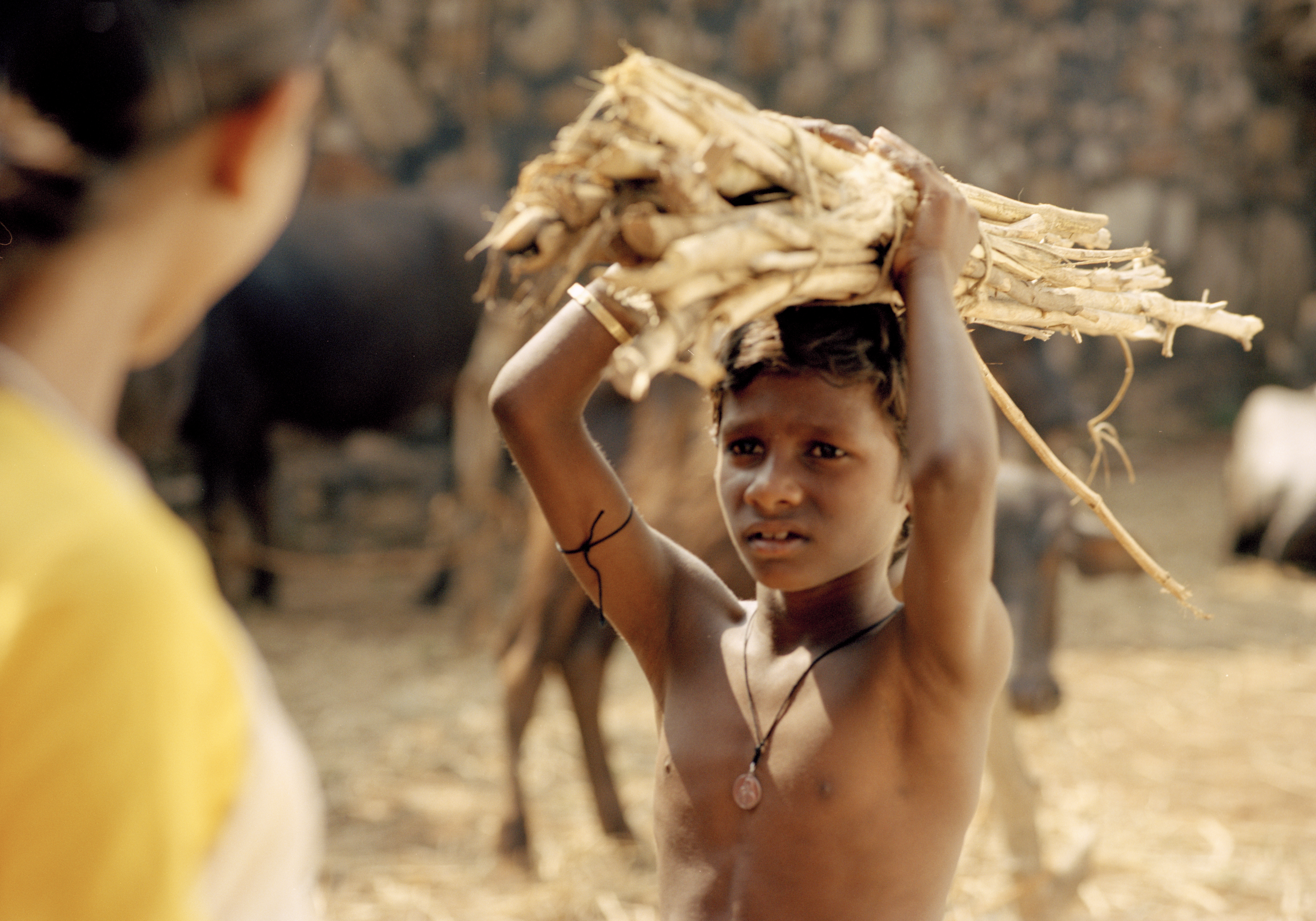
Yadigiri confronts Vanaja when she hangs her clothes on the landlady's line.

- Mamatha Bhukya as Vanaja
- Urmila Dammannagari as Rama Devi
- Ramachandriah Marikanti as Somayya
- Krishnamma Gundimalla as Radhamma
- Karan Singh as Shekhar
- Bhavani Renukunta as Lacchi, Vanaja's friend
- Krishna Garlapati as Ram Babu, the Postman
- Prabhu Garlapati as Yadigiri, the farmhand who taunts Vanaja
- Jenima Barla as Vanaja's child

== Production ==
=== Background ===
Director Rajnesh Domalpalli graduated with bachelor's and master's degrees in electrical engineering in 1984 and 1986. While working on his bachelor's degree at the Indian Institute of Technology Bombay, he wrote short stories. One of his stories, The Dowry, was twice selected for broadcast by BBC World Service while he was in graduate school. During schooling, he was introduced to south Indian classical music, especially on the veena, and followed this up with years of training on the vocals.

While he was working as a software engineer in Silicon Valley, California, he pursued filmmaking and graduated with a Master of Fine Arts degree from Columbia University.

A short synopsis, including a character and a conflict study of Vanaja, was Domalpalli's project submission in his first semester at the Columbia University in fall of 2001. The story was inspired by a child's scream upon being separated from her mother in Sophie's Choice. Over the next three semesters, however, the story veered from its original focus of mother-child separation to what Domalpalli later described as a study of "elements of class distinction and conflict that continue to infuse our society and culture even today." Referring to its emphasis, he said the film was also about "fading institutions of folk art, old buildings that are collapsing, things which we should be protecting — which are a part of our heritage." Speaking of the need for preservation of Indian culture and heritage, he said that making the film was an opportunity to emphasise the Indian folk arts, too.

=== Filmmaking ===
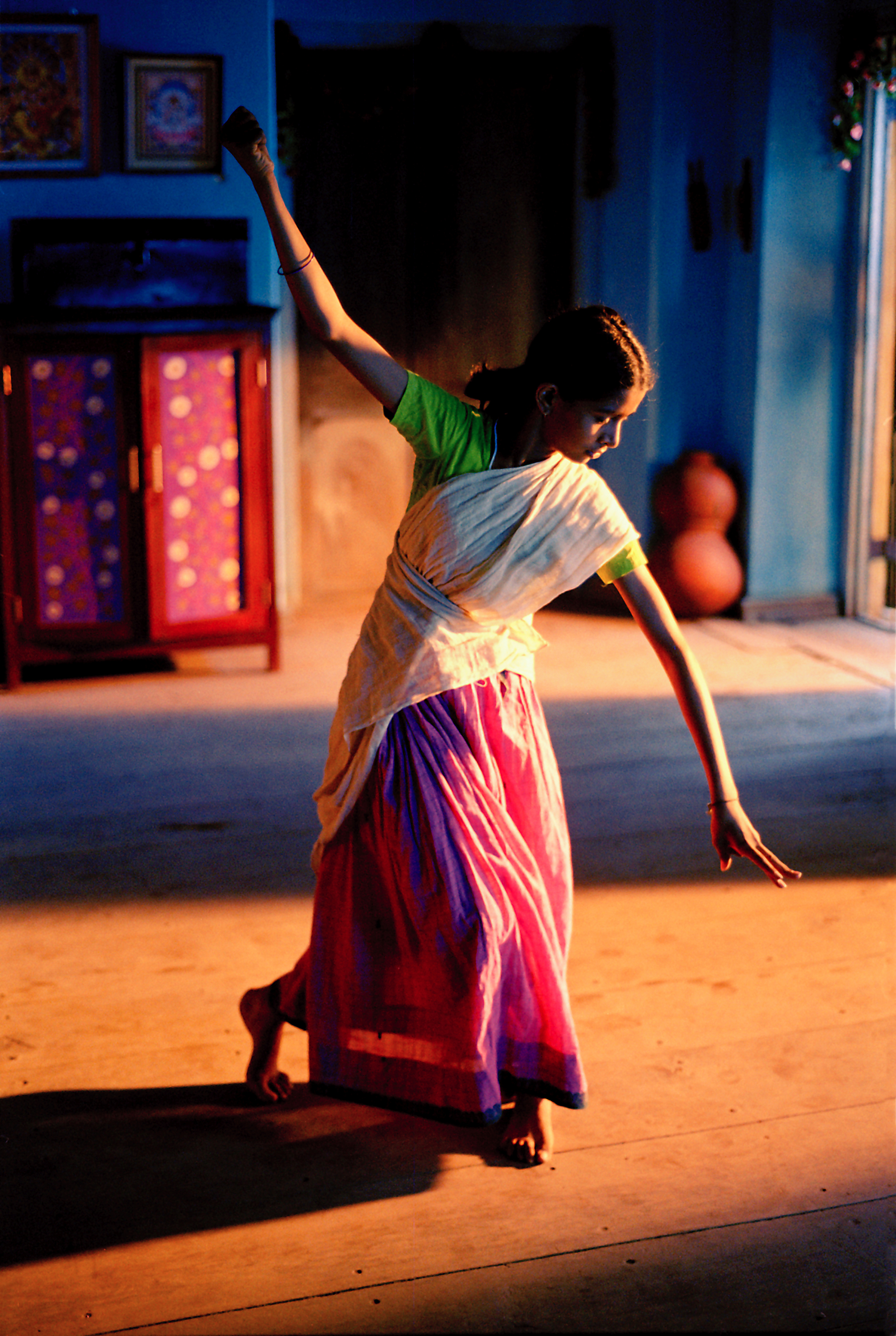
Vanaja invokes Goddess Durga during a Kuchipudi dance called “Igiri Nandini”. In the dance, she narrates how the Gods combined powers to create Goddess Durga to kill the demon Mahishasura. This dance appears close to the end of the film.

With the early version of the script being ready at the end of his fourth semester, Domalpalli's initial intent was to find financing for Vanaja in India and then in the United States. However, he could not find financing. Domalpalli decided to select non-professionals and train them in a year. In the United States, producers voiced similar concerns over the marketability of the film and what they referred to as "its lack of cohesion." Beside this, Domalpalli's inexperience in filmmaking added to their concerns. Recalling initial hurdles, Domalpalli later said, "it was only when I showed my professors a rough cut of the film, and they approved, that purse strings finally came loose." It eventually constituted the thesis for his master's degree.

He imbibed socio-cultural ethos from his upbringing in several rural areas of Andhra Pradesh, and this prompted him to make the movie in the Telugu language. In 2004, he began filming with a meagre sum of USD 20000 provided by his mother Latha Domalpalli, the eventual film producer. Referring to filming the burrakatha (a story-telling technique used in southern India) scene at the beginning of the film, Domalpalli said:

If you talk to people who perform a Burrakatha, you will see a huge difference in the way the older generation performs the art vis-à-vis the way the younger generation performs it... This has happened because of the advent of television. Burrakatha is a long-format art form. The point we are making is that if we don't protect these folk arts, they will be on their way out.

The producers faced a stiff challenge in securing a rural bungalow to serve as the landlady's mansion. Even after obtaining a building as the best possible fit in the coastal town of Bobbili, infestation of snakes and bats posed a problem for the crew. In addition, the building was not strong enough to support the filming equipment. Under these circumstances, the makeshift production designers refurbished the building with space for chicken coops and goat pens as required by the script. To make the space look inhabited, local help was sought for trampling the ground with their livestock. The local people wanted to act as extras in exchange for providing farming tools, bullock carts and other material. As a result, the crew had to ensure that these extras didn't look into the camera during filming.

"Given the rural nature of the story, and the tendency of most local acting to lean towards the theatrical, it was clear that non-actors drawn from hutments, labor camps and the vast Indian middle class were the right choice," said Domalpalli, referring to his choice of casting. In addition, the inclusion of Radhamma's character was to bring a natural feel for the film. Her behavior such as the way she "sits, stands, moves, grunts and groans — that is the way people from a village talk and behave... You would immediately recognize a person who served you breakfast... That makes a point."

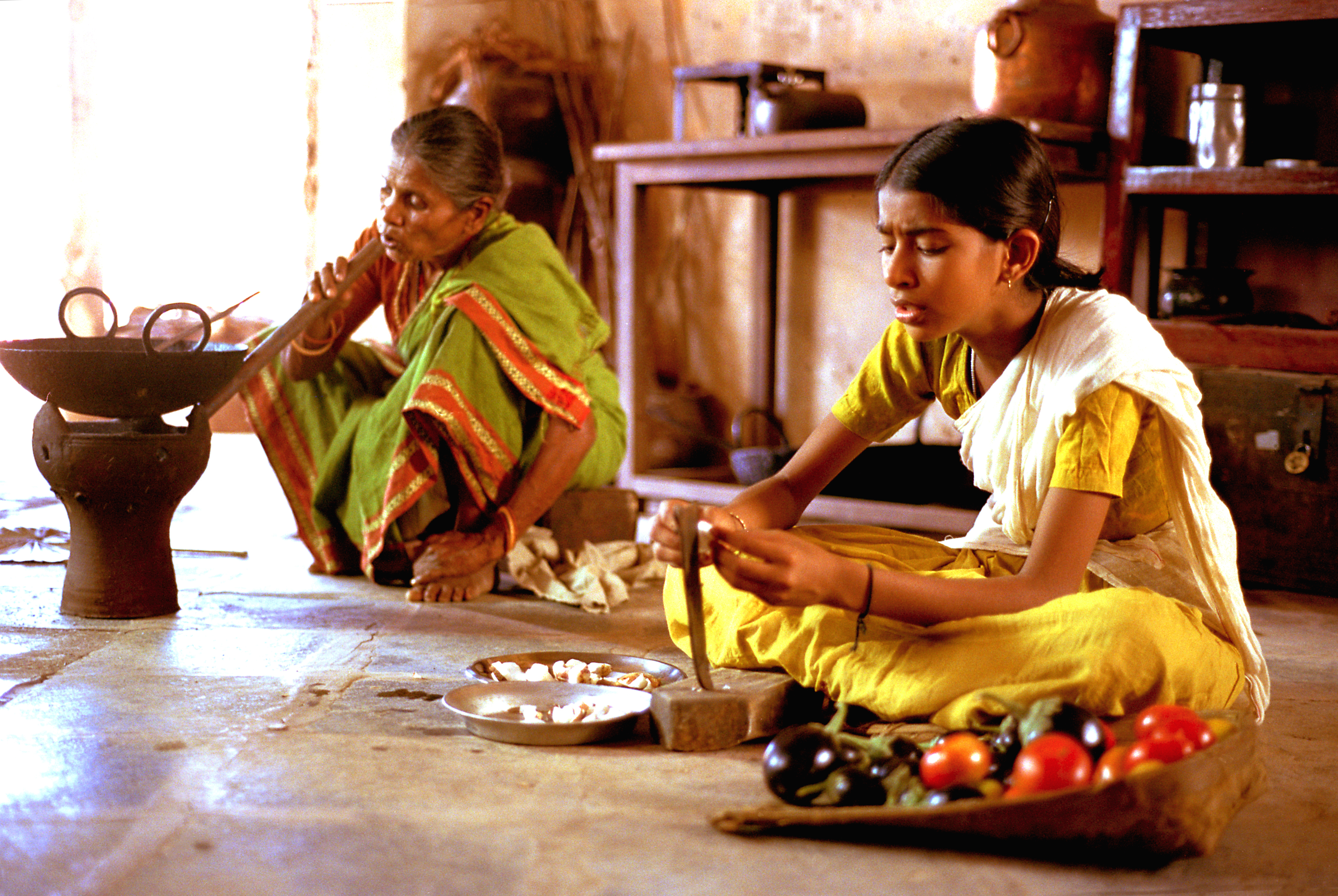
Vanaja is seen slicing a coconut, while the cook, Radhamma, stokes a coal fire.

Referring to the challenges faced in casting, he said that while they were canvassing local people for auditions, they were warding off rumours that they were after the people's kidneys. When placing a newspaper advertisement for the landlady's character did not seem viable, they advertised for household help instead. Upon seeing this, Urmila Dammannagari turned up for the interview with Domalpalli. Inadvertently, their conversation veered toward the film and the real motive behind the advertisement became evident. Though initially shocked and despite the fact that she had to commute 25 kilometres (16 mi) from her house to the location, she took up the role. Professionally Krishnamma Gundimalla, who played the role of Radhamma, carried bricks on her head as a construction worker. On the other hand, Ramachandriah Marikanti, who plays Vanaja's fisherman father, was a municipal sweeper and worked as a security guard.

For casting Vanaja and Lacchi, he said that they met approximately 2500 children, interviewed about 260, and finally selected two from a shortlist of five to play the roles of Vanaja and Lacchi. Parents of these children were distrustful of them because their wards would have to frequently commute to Domalpalli's house for acting lessons for at least a year. Domalpalli felt that "to convince people to devote so much of their children's time and energy was hard enough, but to find the right combination of intelligence, commitment and talent as well was probably the steepest cliff they had to climb." While visiting schools for identifying the child cast, Mamatha Bhukya at first was not selected because her hair was short. But after she sang a song on Mahatma Gandhi, she was selected for the role. Srinivas Devarakonda, a disciple of well-known Kuchipudi guru Vempati Chinna Satyam, taught Mamatha the classical dance form for a year in the basement of Domalpalli's house. Due to this sustained effort, she altered her ambitions from becoming a doctor to an actress and a Kuchipudi dancer. Bhavani Renukunta was chosen for Lacchi's role after an interview at the Hyderabad office of Varija Films, the company that handled the publicity.

Suriname-born Milton Kam, who had shot 10 feature films and more than 50 short films, was chosen as the director of photography. Since Domalpalli's experience was limited to short video films with a different aspect ratio, he was shocked to look through the Super 16mm lens the day they commenced the shoot. However, Kam helped him to stay composed during the production.

Domalpalli used Carnatic music for the background score. This featured the violin-playing of B. S. Narayanan. a student of renowned Carnatic violinist T. N. Krishnan. Narayanan played the popular Jayadeva ashtapadi "Sa virahe", having retuned it in the mode or rāga known as "Behag".

Domalpalli used "janapada geetalu" in the film: folk songs that are rarely heard. To record these songs for the film, Domalpalli and his crew travelled to towns and villages in rural Andhra.

== Release and reception ==
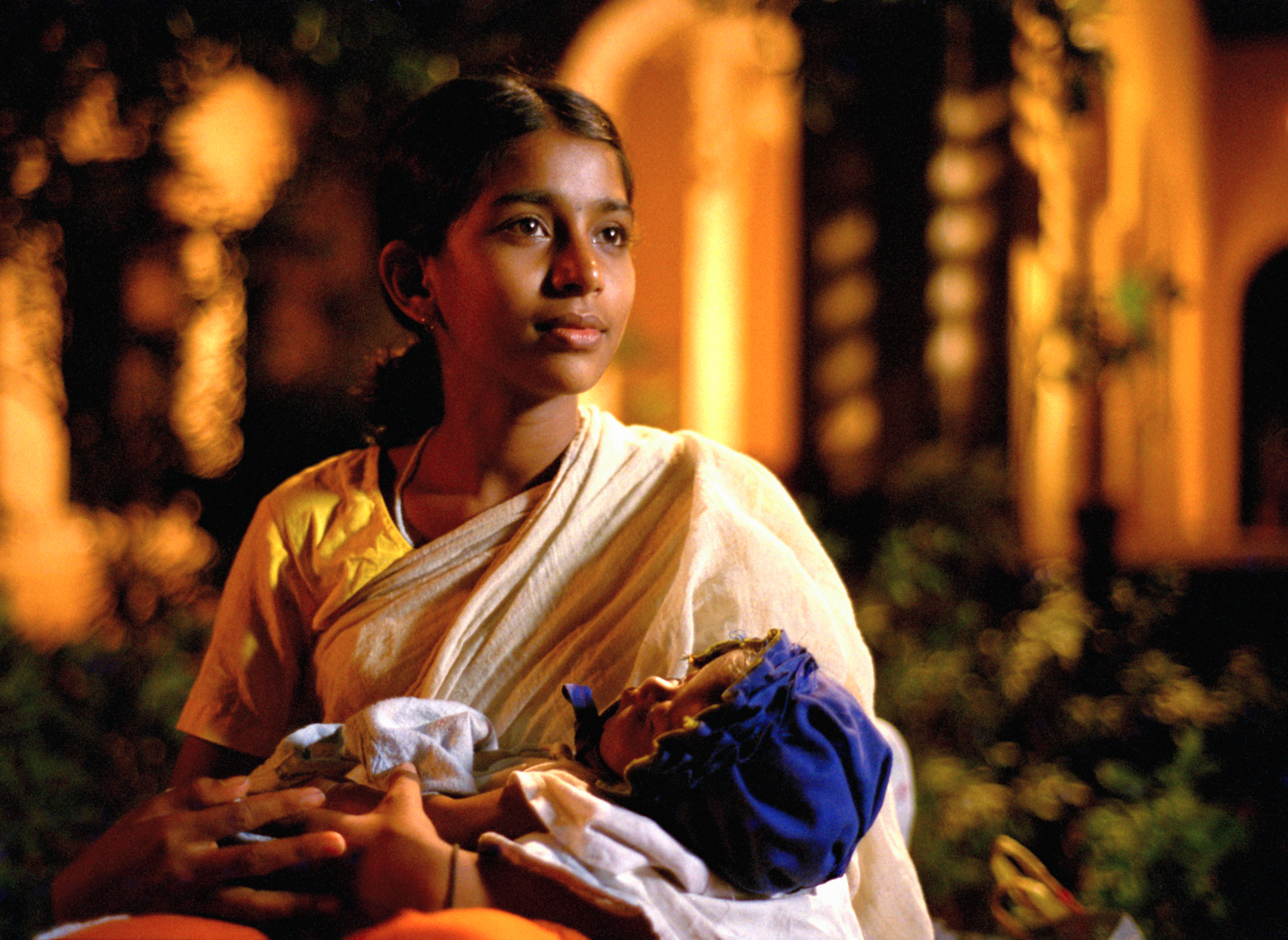
Vanaja with her child

The film was released in the United States on 31 August 2007. After being screened at over 100 film festivals in 49 countries, Vanaja has won 24 international awards and 2 nominations. The Motion Picture Association of America (MPAA), invited the screenplay to be placed in the permanent archives of the Margaret Herrick Library. The DVD, which released on 8 March 2008, has subtitle options in English. Besides interviews with Domalpalli and Bhukya, unedited dance sequences and several short films of Domalpalli, the DVD is available in 16:9 Anamorphic widescreen, Dolby Digital 5.1 Surround, widescreen and NTSC format. While reviewing it, Jeffrey Kauffman from DVD Talk observed that though most of the film was made using natural lighting situations, the colour and saturation quality was excellent. Further, the reviewer was quite favourable about the use of exotic sounds right from birds to the instruments.

=== Special screenings and awards ===
On 11 September 2006, Vanaja first premiered at the Toronto International Film Festival. The same year, it won an Honorable Mention for the Golden Starfish Award at the Hamptons International Film Festival. It won the Best Narrative Film award at the Indo-American Arts Council Film Festival. Following that, it was showcased at the International Film Festival of India and the International Film Festival of Kerala by the end of 2006.

At the film's screening at the 2007 Berlin Film Festival, it won a standing ovation from the audience, bringing Mamatha Bhukya to tears and emotionally affecting Rajnesh Domalpalli. The film won the Best First Feature award at this festival. The same year, Vanaja received a special international jury prize at the Cairo International Film Festival, Best Feature at the Memphis International Film Festival, Best International Film at the Sacramento International Film Festival, and a Platinum award at the WorldFest-Houston International Film Festival. It received a special mention for the grand jury prize at the Indian Film Festival of Los Angeles, the Miloš Macourek Award in special recognition for a feature film for youth at the Zlín International Film Festival, an Achievement Award at the Newport Beach Film Festival, and a special jury prize for Best Production Design at the RiverRun International Film Festival. It won the prize for Best Cinematography at the Rhode Island International Film Festival, the first prize in the live-action feature film category at the Chicago International Children's Film Festival, and the Camério Meilleur Long Métrage/Starlink Aviation award at the Carrousel international du film de Rimouski. In addition, the film won also won an award for the best live-action film at the International Young Audience Film Festival. Bhukya won the best actress award at the Asian Festival of First Films. It was chosen as one of 13 "key films" when the Locarno International Film Festival focused on India in 2011.

=== Reviews ===
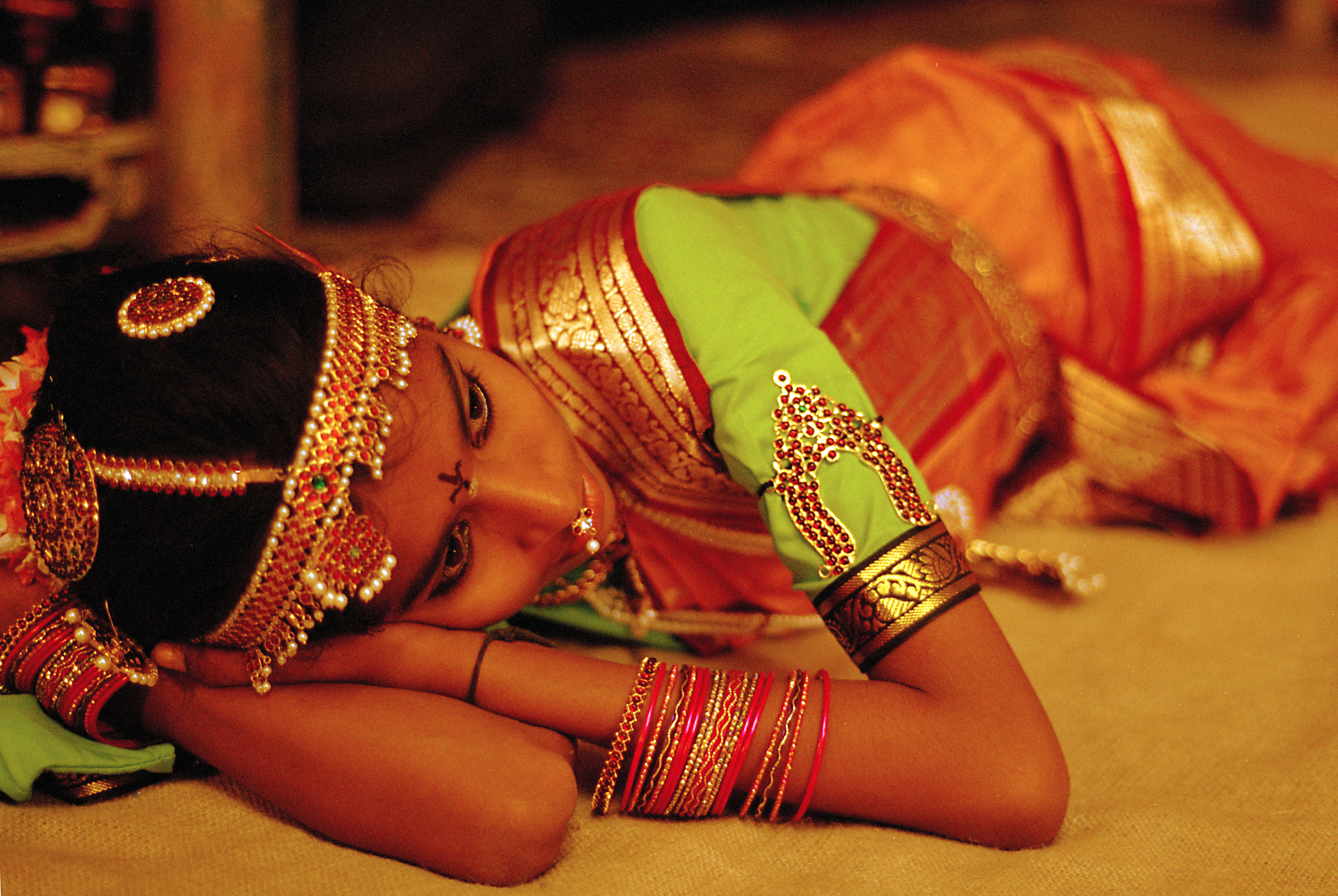
Vanaja rests on the set after performing a Kuchipudi dance Tillana.

The film received an overall positive response from critics and was particularly noted for the theme and for Mamatha Bhukya's performance. The review aggregator Rotten Tomatoes gives the film a score of 85% based on 26 critic reviews with an average rating of 7/10. Roger Ebert described Bhukya as "a natural star, her eyes and smile illuminating a face of freshness and delight." Writing about Vanaja, he added that "there are the glorious colors of saris and room decorations, the dazzle of dance costumes and the dusty landscape that somehow becomes a watercolor by Edward Lear, with its hills and vistas, its oxen and elephants, its houses that seem part of the land. In this setting, Domalpalli tells his story with tender precision, and never an awkward moment." Ebert listed it among the top five foreign films of 2007. According to Laura Kern from The New York Times, the film "is a coming-of-age tale that is engrossing, if slightly overlong, and absolutely timeless, unfolding against an antiquated class system that sadly stands firm in rural areas of India to this day."

A review in Variety called it "a film that touches the heartstrings as it brings home the cruel class distinctions that poison Indian society," and said it "is more than a children's film, despite revolving around a central character of 14. Its social message, linked to the story of a poor farm girl who aspires to be a dancer, never feels forced, and the moral issues it depicts are realistically complex." Commenting on its commercial feasibility, the review concluded that "while that might not translate into obvious box office potential, art house appeal is there for distributors willing to seek out a market." The Chicago Tribune wrote:

It's a touching, believable, often funny but ultimately sad tale of how one class can take advantage of another, even in the guise of patronizing benevolence. Though sometimes shifting abruptly in time, Vanaja is an arresting story of modern-day hardship and class exploitation, recalling Charles Dickens as well as Western fairy-tale lore. Domalpalli's settings are ultra-real in detail and color, from the crude, almost feudal deprivations of Vanaja's dirt-floor background to the stately rituals and autocratic entitlement of the well-to-do.

Speaking of Bhukya's performance, the San Francisco Chronicle writes, "Bhukya delivers an entrancing and natural performance, deftly balancing both the wide-eyed childishness of a young girl with the dawning awareness of life's darker possibilities. She's also an accomplished dancer, which she proves at several points in the film." It adds, "can this wonder-filled film truly be not only Domalpalli's first feature, but originally part of a thesis submission at Columbia University? Both in the film's writing and direction, Domalpalli displays maturity, wisdom and a loving sense of visual and character detail." Marc Savlov of The Austin Chronicle proclaimed, "director Domalpalli, who, with his debut feature, turned in what may well be the best Columbia University master's thesis ever." The Hartford Courant also claimed like the Chicago Tribune that the film would remind the Western audience of Charles Dickens, and further stated that it "... gives a detailed sense of place and shows a mastery of story telling. The themes of fate and class resonate and the work of the amateur players is remarkably moving."

Despite the generally positive reception, some critics differed in their opinion of the content and depiction. The New York Post criticised the film saying that "there's enough mush in the Indian melodrama Vanaja to fill an entire season of a TV soap opera," adding that toward its ending, the "viewers will be bored stiff by (the) long, tedious film". Though the "narrative meanders ... [it] evokes village life with stark authenticity," said a review by Time Out.
