= Chowka bhara =

Indian board game

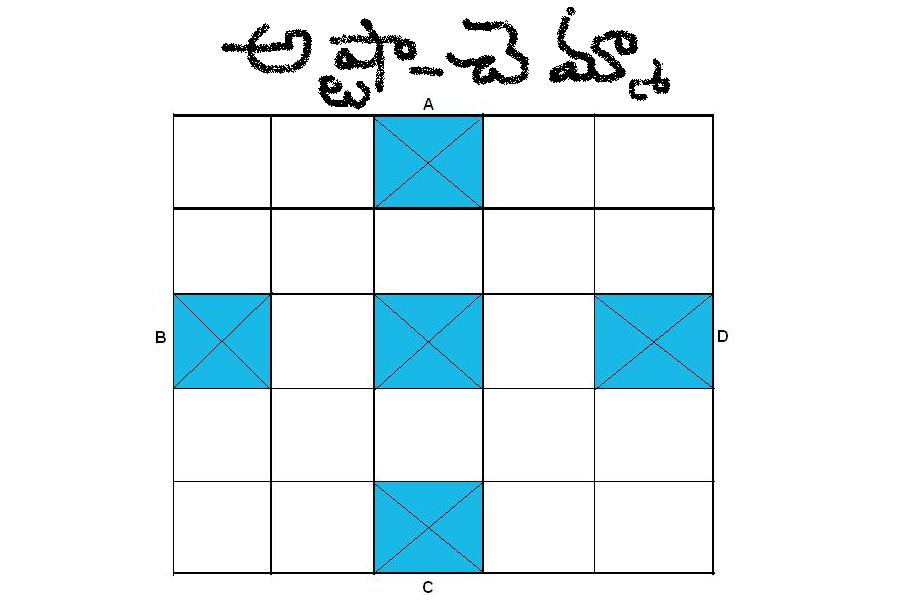
5x5 Board

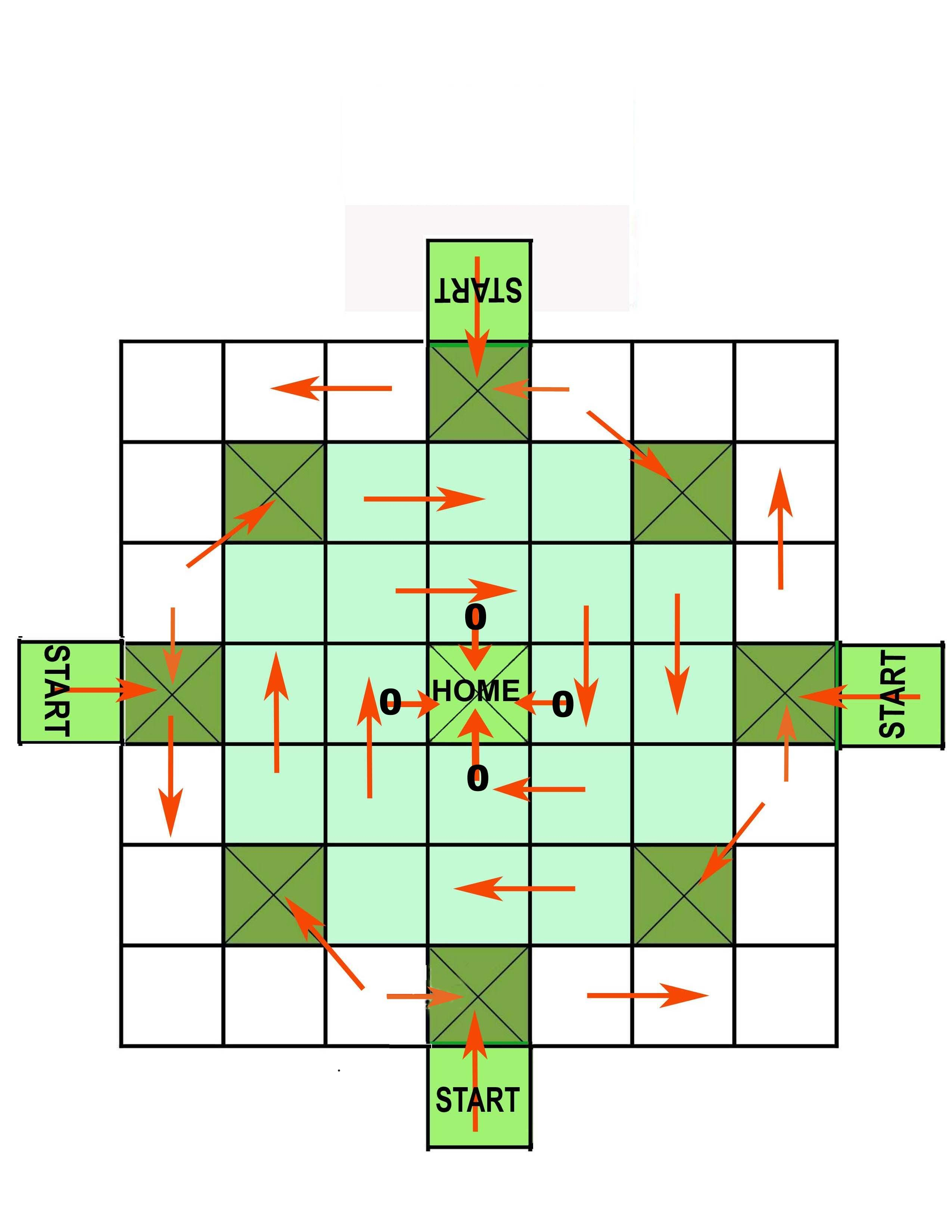
7x7 Board

Chowka Bara or Ashta Chamma is a two- or four-player board game from India. This game is an example of a “fully observable” system that has an element of chance introduced by the roll of special dice and an element of strategy (the strategy being the pawn the player decides to move after the roll of the dice). While traditionally played with 4 or 6 cowry shells, dice can also be used.

== History ==
The game of Chowka Bhara is one of the oldest board games in existence, still being played in certain parts of India. There are references to this game in some ancient Indian epics like the Mahabharata.

== Names ==
This game is called by various names in different languages in different regions of India. This list shows the name, the language and then the region:

- Chauka Bara - Kannada - Mysuru region - Karnataka
- Gatta Bara - Kannada - Mysuru region - Karnataka
- Katte Mane - Kannada - Rural Mysuru - Karnataka
- Gatta Mane - Kannada - Rural Mysuru - Karnataka
- Chakaara - Kannada - Karnataka
- Pakidakali - Malayalam - Kerala region
- Ashta Chamma (అష్టా చమ్మ) - Telugu - Andhra Pradesh/Telangana
- Daayam or Thaayam - Tamil - Tamil Nadu
- Atthu (अट्ठू) - Hindi - Madhya Pradesh
- Kanna Kauri (कन्ना कौड़ी) - Hindi - Jabalpur, Madhya Pradesh
- Kavidi Kali - Malayalam - Kerala
- Chunga (चंगा) - Hindi - Madhya Pradesh
- Champool / Kach Kangri - Marathi - Maharashtra
- Challas Aath - Marathi - Western Maharashtra
- Champal Paani (चंपल पाणी) - Marathi - Central Maharashtra
- Ahmedabad Baji / Chomal Ishto / Kaangi Chaala / Mach Kooki - Gujarati - Gujrat
- Changa Po - Rajasthan
- Cheeta / Chanda - Madhya Pradesh
- Teri Chowk - Chhattisgarh

== Setup ==
Chowka bhara normally has a 5x5 square board and four players, but one can also increase the number of squares depending on the number of players to any odd number squared (for example, 11x11). Assuming the size of the board is NxN (with N being odd), then each player will have N-1 pawns.

Example of a chowka bhara board showing the path of Player 1.

The 5x5 version is shown in the example diagram. Four players each have four pawns, starting at different positions at the four crossed squares at the outermost ring.

== Play ==
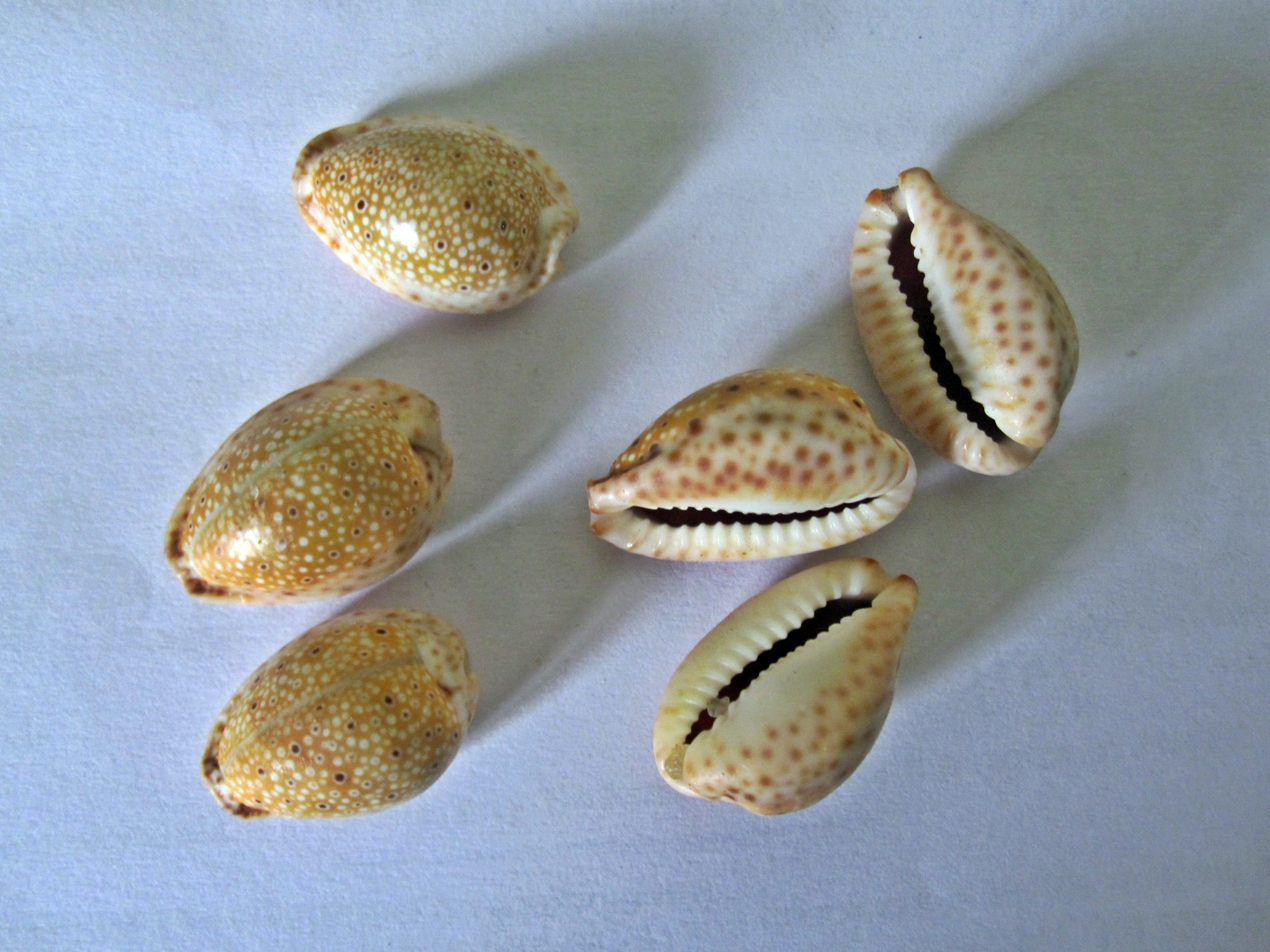
Cowrie shells used as dice, though in this picture six were thrown instead of the four used in this game. Shows three as is and three inverted.

The game is controlled by throwing four cowry shells and counting how many are 'as it is' versus those that land 'inverted': if all four shells land inverted it is called "ashta" and if all land as it is then it is called a "chamma".

Each player takes a turn to roll the cowrie shells. The mouth of the shell landing upwards has a value of 1 and downwards has a value of 0. However, if every shell shows a value of 0, then the value of the roll is 8 and if all of them shows a value of 1, then the value of the roll is 4. Therefore, the possible values are 1, 2, 3, 4 and 8. Casting 4 or 8 gives the player an additional turn, which can continue until that player rolls a number other than 4 or 8 (namely 1, 2, or 3).

Depending on the number rolled, the player can move one of their pawns that many number of squares on the board, or with multiple rolls, can move more than one piece. Each player has a fixed path to move pawns, which is in an anti-clockwise direction. The path for Player 1 is given in the example diagram. Each player's piece must completely traverse the outer squares before moving into the inner squares.

The tokens enter the board only after a Chamma or Ashta is thrown, however this is not for all variations, in others players may begin regardless of their first roll. Since each cowrie carries 2 points, 2 tokens for Chamma and 4 tokens for Ashta are entered on the board. The tokens travel anti-clockwise in outer squares, clockwise in inner squares and finally land up in central square (home), with a throw of Ashta or Chamma. If a player's token lands on a square occupied by opponent's token, then the opponent's token is "killed" and the player gets an extra turn to play. The killed token returns to its starting home square and has to go round all over again. In crossed boxes, killing is not possible. When a token reaches the square left of its home square, it further moves up into the inner squares and now moves in clockwise direction. However the tokens enter the inner squares, only when at least one of the opponent's tokens are killed. Otherwise they keep circling around until at least one of the tokens of an opponent is killed by them. Every token need not kill an opponent. Each token finishes its race when it manages to get into the home. The first player to get all his tokens into home wins the game.

Whenever a Chamma or an Ashta is obtained during a throw of the shells, the player gets a bonus turn to throw the cowries. When a player cuts an opponent's token, he gets an extra turn to play. During an extra turn, either the same token or some other token can be played. If a player throws either a Chamma or an Ashta three times consecutively during his turn, he is out, and cannot use any of the moves. If a player has cut once, all the coins can move into the inner circle, not necessary for every coin to cut opponent. When most of the tokens are dead, it is possible to bring back the dead tokens. For Ashta, 2 tokens and for Chamma 1 token can be brought back.

Cowries and their values:

- 3 inverted, 1 as is - Move 1 square
- 2 inverted, 2 as is - Move 2 squares
- 1 inverted, 3 as is - Move 3 squares
- 4 as is, Chamma - Move 4 squares
- 4 inverted, Ashta - Move 8 squares

In Senior board (8x4=32) tokens of four distinct colours are used. Since each cowry carries 1 point, 4 tokens for Chamma and 8 tokens for Ashta are entered on the board. The rules of playing Senior board is same as that of Junior board. When most of the tokens are dead, it is possible to bring back the dead tokens. For 8, 1 token, for Ashta, 4 tokens and for Chamma 2 tokens can be brought back.

Cases when cowries are cast:

- 1 as is and 7 inverted; move 1 square

In some places there is no move of 1. If you throw 1 as is and 7 inverted; you move 11 squares and this is also a bonus chance.

- 2 as is and 6 inverted; move 2 squares;

In some places a player can move Two tokens opposite of the closing square and by throwing 2 one can declare Two tokens finishing the race. As 1 doesn't exist. But making two tokens stand opposite the clearance square also puts the player at higher risk as the opponent can kill two tokens at one time and they have to do the whole race again.

- 3 as is and 5 inverted; move 3 squares
- 4 as is and 4 inverted; move 4 squares
- 5 as is and 3 inverted; move 5 squares
- 6 as is and 2 inverted; move 6 squares
- 7 as is and 1 inverted; move 7 squares. If one gets 7 he cannot kill an opponent token by this move and can only carry on a movement normal.
- 8 as is Chamma; move 4 squares

Or Is considered as 12 and gets a bonus to throw again. In ashta chamma played by Telugu people of Andhra Pradesh.

- 8 as is Ashta; move 8 squares
- 8 inverted drakshi; move 16 squares

== Objective of the game ==
For a player to win, they must have all their pawns in the center square.

== Rules ==
This game has several intricate rules which need to be followed. Although there are several variations of this game, the following rules are for the standard implementation:

- if we get 4 time 3 then the player got their pawns will not move and
- if we got 4 time 4 then the player cannot move and their turn is passed.

1. A player casts the shells to determine the number of square their pawns can move. If a player has cast 1,2 or 3, then their needs to choose one of their pawns and move it that many squares along the path designated for that player. The player needs to be able to smartly choose a pawn to move, so that it optimizes their chance of winning the game. If a player has cast either a 4 or an 8, the player will have another turn to cast the dice. The player does not have to move any of their pawns until they have cast 1, 2, or 3.

For example, if a player casts a 4, they will get another chance to roll the dice. If on the second turn they get a 3, then the player can move one of their pawns 4 squares and one of their other pawns 3 squares. They can of course choose to move the same pawn (4+3) 7 squares if they want to. This argument can be extended to the player getting 3 or more consecutive turns.

2. "Hit": Pawns of two players cannot exist in the same square, other than a "Safe" square, which are marked with an X in the figure. For a 5x5 board this is simply the starting positions of each of the players and the center square. However, for higher dimension boards, more safe squares can be added symmetrically across the board.

So if the pawn of player X lands on the same square of a pawn of player Y, then player X has "hit" player Y. Player Y's pawn is returned to its starting square and this pawn needs to start over. For a player's pawn to progress into the inner squares, they should have "hit" at least one of their opponent's pawns. This condition is imposed on the player and not on his pawn. For example, even if one of the player's pawns has hit one of the opponent's, then all their other pawns will be eligible to enter the inner square. If it so happens that a player cannot move any of their pawns because they have not "hit" any of their opponents, then the player will lose that turn.

3. "Double": It is possible for a player to have two of their pawns in the same square. This is called a "double". If a player forms a double on the outer square, then it blocks the opponent's pawns behind them for one move; i.e. if an opponent's pawn crosses the double, then that move is voided and the opponent loses a turn. However, on the next turn for the same opponent, their pawn can go past (or "cross") the double. This rule is applicable for every opponent of the player in the game. This rule is not valid once the double is formed on the inner squares. For the player forming the double, there are two choices on his subsequent moves. They can "break" the double by moving only one of the pawns in it, or keep the double and advance the pawns together. In case a player has got multiple turns (as they may have thrown 4s and 8s), they can treat the double as one pawn and make it move to one of the values on the dice.

4. Double vs Single: It is not possible for a single pawn to "hit" a double. A player cannot move their single pawn to the same square as an opponent's double. A player cannot move past an opponent's double for 1 move. However, a double can "hit" a single pawn, and make it move back to its home square. If 2 singles are in the same square, then the double can "hit" only one of the singles. the other single is not affected at all.

5. Reaching the central square: A pawn needs to reach the central square exactly. For example, if a pawn is 3 squares away from the center and the player throws a 4, then that pawn cannot be moved. If that is the only pawn left for the player to move (which may be because of a variety of reasons such as being blocked by double, or by virtue of being the last pawn left), the player will lose their turn.

== Tools ==
- Four pawns per players (Maximum players - 4, Minimum players - 2)
- Four tamarind seeds or four shells or a die
- Piece of chalk
- An even surface for the board and to roll the dice (draw 5x5 square on the plane space)

== Popular culture ==
Ashta Chamma plays a pivotal role in the 2006 Indian art house film Vanaja.

In 2008, a Tollywood comedy film, Ashta Chamma, was released, which was written and directed by Mohan Krishna Indraganti. The film deals with four quirky protagonists whose tales are interwoven in a romantic narration.

== See also ==
- Ashte kashte
- Pachisi
- List of chess variants
- Ludo

== Bibliography ==
- Mahabharata, Ved Vyasa
- Traditional Board Games of India, Raghu Dharmendra, Chauka Bara
- Online KavidiKali (Malayalam name of Ashta Chemma)
- Peddabala Siksha (Telugu Encyclopedia) - by Gajula Satyanarayana
