= John Jeffcoat =

American film director

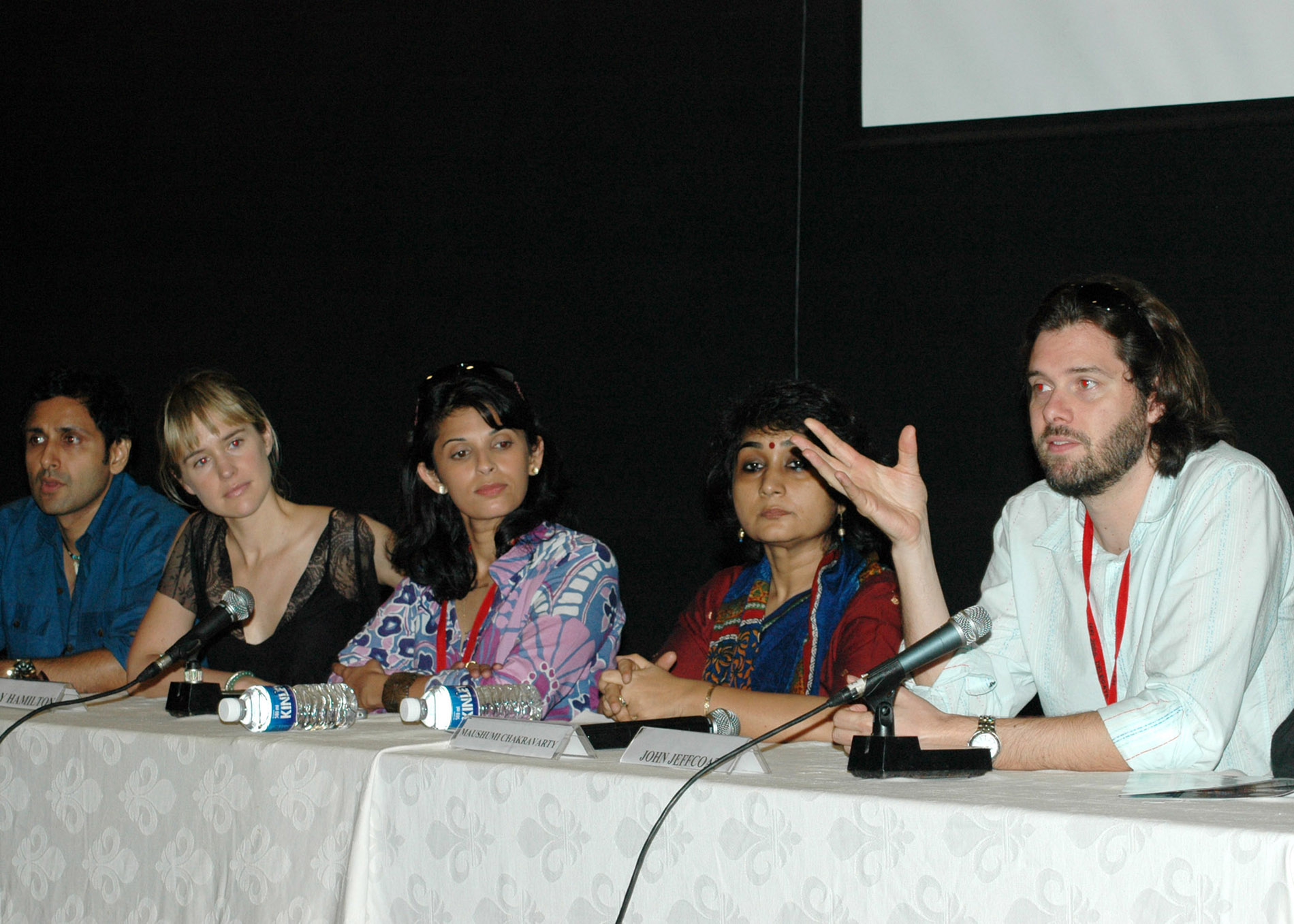
- Jeffcoat (right) at IFFI 2006
- Born: U.S.
- Citizenship: U.S.
- Occupation: Film director

John Jeffcoat is an American film director. He is best known for his film Outsourced starring Josh Hamilton and Ayesha Dharker. The film was adapted as a television series, and ran for one season before being cancelled.

John Jeffcoat graduated from Denison University in 1994, and in addition to directing has worked as a writer, producer, cinematographer and editor. He lives in Seattle with his wife and their 2 children.
