= Ashte kashte =

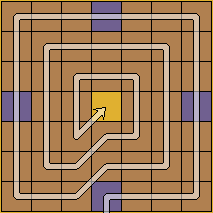
Ashte kashte board showing the route of one player.

Ashta-kashte is a race board game from Bengal akin to the Cross and Circle family for two to four players originating in India. Although there is no evidence for that, it is considered by some as the direct ancestor of Pachisi. It is played on a board with a 7-by-7 grid on it. It is similar to Chowka bhara, or to Ashtam changam pe where there is a 5-by-5 grid on the board.

Players race their pieces around the board, spiralling inwards to be the first to get all of their pieces to the centre. Movement is controlled by throwing cowry shells, but there is also an element of strategy to the game.

Also called Koli kaDam in Hyderabad, or Champul in other parts of India.

== Equipment ==
The board is a square divided into seven rows and columns. The outer centre squares on each side of the board are specially marked. They are the starting squares for each player, and also function as resting squares.

Each player has four pieces.

Four cowry shells are used as dice. They are thrown and the number of shells that lie with their openings upwards indicates the number of spaces a player should move:

Upward openings	Movement
4	4 and another turn
3	3
2	2
1	1
(none)	8 and another turn

== Play ==
Players begin with no pieces on the board. A piece may enter the board on any throw of the cowries and moves to the square corresponding to the throw. Each player starts on their own starting square and moves around the board in an anticlockwise spiral. The paths of each player are different because each player starts on a different square and moves inwards at a different position on the board.

A player can capture an opponent's piece by landing their piece upon it. The captured piece is removed from the board and must start again. A piece cannot land on an opponent's piece that is on a resting square.

If a player lands their piece on another of their own pieces, it becomes a double. Doubles cannot be passed over by single pieces (whether the player's or the opponent's), and they can only be captured by other doubles. In addition, the two pieces that make up the double may be moved together.

The end (centre square) can only be reached by a direct throw. If a player throws a number larger than that needed to reach the end, they must move another piece or wait till their next turn.
