= Mullet (haircut) =

Hairstyle

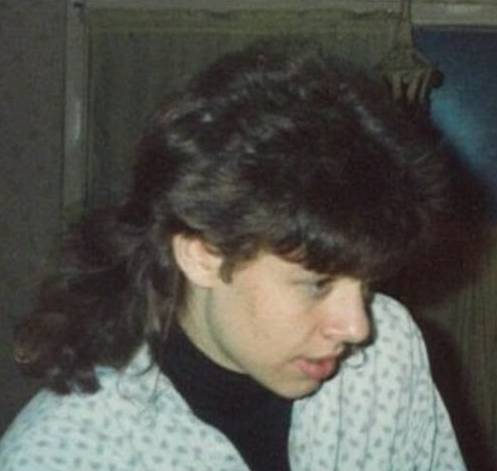
A man wearing a mullet in the 1980s

The mullet is a hairstyle in which the hair is cut shorter at the front, top and sides, but is longer at the back.

== Etymology ==
According to the Oxford English Dictionary, use of the term mullet to describe this hairstyle was "apparently coined, and certainly popularized, by American hip-hop group the Beastie Boys", who used mullet and mullet head as epithets in their 1994 song "Mullet Head", combining it with a description of the haircut: "number one on the side and don't touch the back, number six on the top and don't cut it wack, Jack." They expounded on the subject at length in a six-page article entitled "Mulling Over The Mullet" in Issue 2 (1995) of their magazine Grand Royal, offering a selection of alternative names for the cut, including "Hockey Player Haircut" and "Soccer Rocker".

Although a widely-circulated online scan of the Australian automotive magazine Street Machine appears to show the term in use as early as January 1992, the Oxford English Dictionary was unable to verify the authenticity of this citation, and it was found to have been a digitally edited fake.

== Fashion history ==
=== In antiquity ===
Historian Suetonius writes that the Roman emperor Tiberius "wore his hair rather long at the back, so much so as even to cover the nape of his neck", and that this was a tradition of his family, the Claudians. One bust of Tiberius's great-nephew Caligula has short locks across the forehead and longer hair behind.

Hector of Troy was thought to have worn his hair short at the front but long at the back, similar to a mullet. Lycophron calls it the "Hector-like" hairstyle. It was also associated with the Daunians and Peucetians.

A metal figurine, dated back to the 1st-century CE and found during 2018 preparations for a new car park at the Wimpole Estate, England, was hypothesised by archaeologists to indicate that natives in ancient Britain during the Roman occupation could have worn their hair similarly to mullets.

In the sixth century, Byzantine scholar Procopius wrote that men from the Blue faction wore their hair long at the back and cut it short over the forehead. This non-Roman style was termed the "Hunnic" look.

Researcher Alan Henderson describes the ancient hairstyle as useful, as it kept the hair out of the eyes, yet provided warmth and protection for the neck.

=== Native America ===
In Mourt's Relation, author Edward Winslow described the Plymouth pilgrims' first encounter with the Native Americans, Samoset of the Abenaki in 1621:

He was a tall straight man, the hair of his head black, long behind, only short before, none on his face at all; …

— Mourt's Relation

=== Native Borneo ===
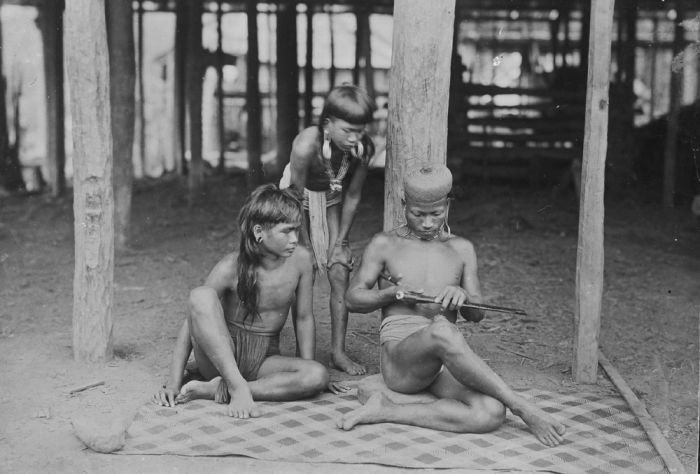
Kayan people (Borneo) with a mullet hairstyle, c. 1898, 1900

Some tribes in Borneo also have mullet hairstyles, including Penan, Dayak Kayan, Kenyah and Iban.

=== 1960s ===
Tom Jones sported a mullet in two of his three 1965 performances of his hit song "It's Not Unusual" on The Ed Sullivan Show, 2 May 1965 and 13 June 1965.

=== 1970s ===
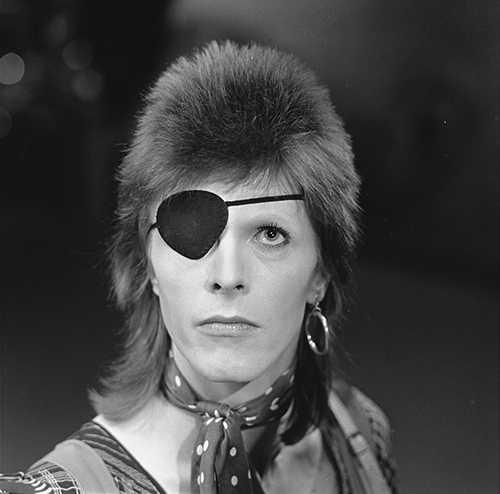
David Bowie with a mullet in 1974

Mullets were worn by rock stars including David Bowie and Paul McCartney in the early 1970s. As a style it was similar to the shag haircut popularized by David Cassidy and Rod Stewart. When writing Neil Peart's eulogy in January 2020, Greg Prato asserted Peart had a mullet, based on his observations of a 1974 video, further suggesting he may have been one of the first rockers to wear a rattail, based on a 1985 video, "The Big Money".

=== 1980s ===
In Australia, the United States and the United Kingdom in the 1980s, mullets were "everywhere", according to Tess Reidy writing at The Guardian in 2019. The 1980s were also the high point of the mullet's popularity in continental Europe. Chinese musician Cui Jian's mullet hairstyle became popular among young Chinese men in the 80s.

Also in the 1980s, the mullet became part of lesbian culture, where it came to be used as a way of identifying oneself as a member of that culture in public.

=== 1990s ===
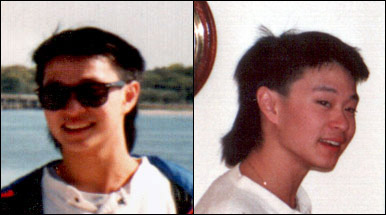
A man with a mullet in 1992

After the much-publicized 1992 DC Comics storyline in which Superman apparently died, the character returned to the 1993 follow-up storyline "Reign of the Supermen", in which he was depicted with a mullet. The cancelled Superman film project, Superman Lives, would have depicted Superman with a mullet.

Punk rock band the Vandals sang of the mullets worn by country music singers and guests of The Jerry Springer Show and listed regional names for the style in the 1998 song "I've Got an Ape Drape". In 1997, gay punk band Pansy Division released their single "Hockey Hair" in Vancouver, Canada about this hairstyle.

Vocalist Wesley Willis wrote and released the track "Cut the Mullet" in 1998 and frequently performed it at live shows.

=== 2000s ===
The 2001 film American Mullet documents the phenomenon of the mullet hairstyle and the people who wear it.

The same year Universal Records (Canada) released the album Mullet Years: Power Ballads, a collection of hard rock ballads.

This hairstyle became popular with the bogan subculture in Australia and New Zealand.

=== 2010s ===
The mullet was banned in Iran as one style on a list of "un-Islamic", "decadent Western cuts".

The mullet has also experienced a revival within American sports. After winning back-to-back Stanley Cups, Phil Kessel was spotted in Pittsburgh Penguins training camp in September 2017 bringing the mullet back to its native roots of Pittsburgh hockey (Jaromír Jágr wore a mullet with the Penguins in the 1990s). Similarly, Oklahoma State head football coach Mike Gundy wore a mullet starting in early 2017; the popularity of his mullet supposedly earned Oklahoma State millions of dollars in marketing revenue. In addition, from 2010 to 2015, Patrick Kane of the Chicago Blackhawks popularized the "playoff mullet," an alternative to the traditional NHL playoff beard. Then-Pittsburgh Steelers running back James Conner began sporting a mullet in 2018, continuing the Yinzer tradition of the hairstyle in Western Pennsylvania. The revival also extended to Australia in the late 2010s, with Australian soccer player Rhyan Grant becoming widely known for his mullet haircut to the point that it was included within the video game FIFA 20.

=== 2020s ===
In September 2020, i-D called 2020 "the year of the mullet", attributing its boom in popularity to COVID-19 lockdowns and the extended closure of hair salons. In an article for Vice Media, the mullet-wearing teenagers interviewed all described getting the haircut as a joke, with one stating "There's an irony to the mullet haircut. It's this disgustingly gross haircut, which means it's definitely worn in an ironic way". Magda Ryczko, founder of a barbershop in Brooklyn, notes that mullets allow for a professional front-facing look for COVID-19 era Zoom meetings, while maintaining a messier, more fun look off-camera, when the longer back section of hair may be revealed. An annual national USA Mullet Championship began in 2020. The versatility of the taper fade has modernized the classic mullet, giving it a cleaner look.

In July 2023, Mexican singer Peso Pluma attracted attention for his mullet style, a hairstyle that he adopted as his signature haircut during his stardom as a musical performer. The singer confirmed that his hairstyle was originally a mishap, when he visited the city of Medellín and his barber gave him a hairstyle that was "popular in Medellín", later realizing that it was not bad after filming a music video.

58-year-old Tami Manis from Knoxville, Tennessee was awarded a Guinness World Record for a 172.72 cm-long (68.00 in) mullet in August 2023, a result of not having the back of her hair cut for 33 years.

In September 2024, 26-year-old Trevor Hyland, of Shrule in County Mayo, Ireland, gained the nickname "The Fresh Prince of Bel-Mullet" after finding himself representing Ireland in a Swiss competition to find the greatest example of the hairstyle. A win might see him representing Ireland at European level.

In 2026, the modern mullet is recognized as a major men's hairstyle trend, characterized by hybrid variations that combine the traditional longer back with fades, tapers, and other contemporary haircut techniques.

== Adaptations ==
=== Rattail ===
The rattail is a hairstyle that consists of leaving only a long strand of hair behind the neck to contrast with the short hair that remains. The strand is curled as it grows longer and in some cases braided, which causes it to resemble the tail of a rat, as its name suggests.

=== Skullet ===
The skullet consists of shaving the top and sides of the skull, leaving the hair long at the back of the head, or if bald, leaving the strands of hair on the sides at the same height as the ears.

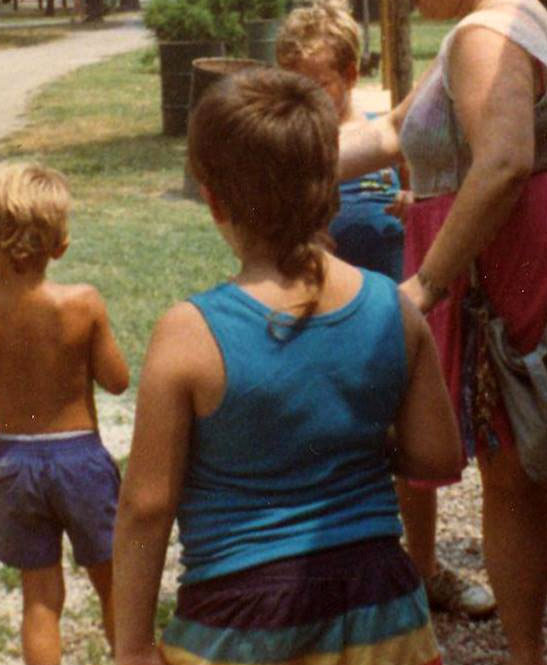
A rattail

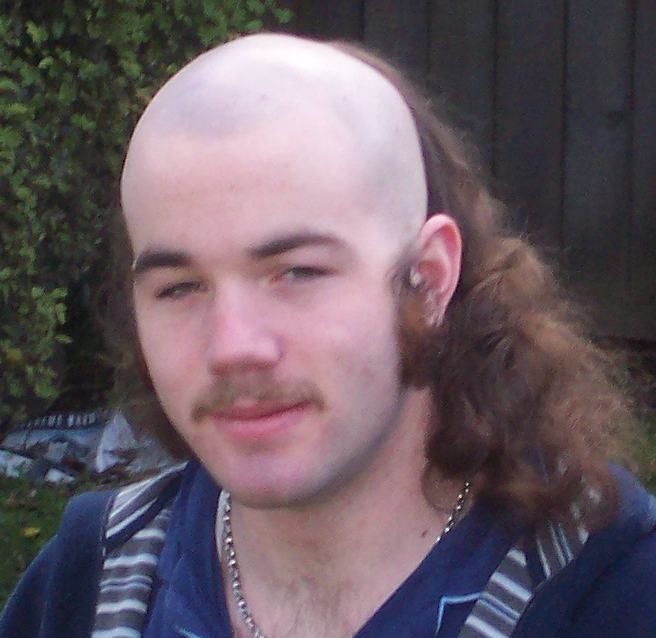
A skullet

Its most famous proponent, British comedian Bill Bailey, adopted the skullet hairstyle and retained it for over three decades.

== In popular culture ==
In 2019, Kiefer Sutherland described himself as an unwitting instigator of the hairstyle, which he sported in the 1987 film The Lost Boys. In 2022 press interviews marking the 35th anniversary of the film, Sutherland again recounted the story.

== See also ==
- List of hairstyles
