= No Maps for These Territories =

- DVD cover
- Directed by: Mark Neale
- Written by: Mark Neale
- Produced by: Mark Neale, Chris Paine, Mark Pellington
- Starring: William Gibson; Jack Womack; Bruce Sterling; Bono
- Cinematography: Grant Gee; Joe Kessler; Steven Miko; Mark Neale; Chris Norr; Mark Ritchie; Phillip Todd
- Edited by: Nicholas Erasmus; Rochelle Watson
- Music by: Daniel Lanois; The Edge tomandandy
- Distributed by: Docurama
- Release date: 2000
- Running time: 89 minutes
- Country: Canada
- Language: English
- Budget: $250,000

No Maps for These Territories is an independent documentary film made by Mark Neale focusing on the speculative fiction author William Gibson. It features appearances by Jack Womack, Bruce Sterling, Bono, and The Edge and was released by Docurama. The film had its world premiere at the Vancouver International Film Festival in October 2000.

== Background and premise ==
On an overcast morning in 1999, William Gibson, father of cyberpunk and author of the cult-classic novel Neuromancer, stepped into a limousine and set off on a road trip around North America. The limo was rigged with digital cameras, a computer, a television, a stereo, and a cell phone. Generated entirely by this four-wheeled media machine, No Maps for These Territories is both an account of Gibson’s life and work and a commentary on the world outside the car windows. Here, the man who coined the word "cyberspace" offers a unique perspective on Western culture at the edge of the new millennium, and in the throes of convulsive, tech – driven change.

— Account of the documentary featured on Docurama's website.

At the time of the project's conception, Gibson – an American exile in Vancouver, Canada – was seen as a reclusive figure, who thought the didactic inclination in novelists anathema and was not prone to divulging much in the way of personal information in interviews and retrospectives. The documentary was intended to assuage the dearth of knowledge of Gibson's perspectives on self, career and culture and to uncover the hitherto obscured depths of the writer.

The film was shot on location in the United States, Canada, Ireland, and the United Kingdom.

== Content ==
During the documentary Gibson muses both on his past and the circumstances that led him to write what he wrote, as well as our present which, accordingly, is starting to resemble in many particulars the futures he has variously penned. He speculates on topics as wide-ranging as post-human society and mechanics, nanotechnology, drugs and drug culture, the effect of Neuromancer on his fans and his later writing career, and the normalisation of technology. The documentary is extremely free-flowing and also highly personal, in that it allows one to gain a close understanding of both the thought processes and internal psychological triggers of William Gibson. He is occasionally prompted by an unseen driver figure, female in voice, and sometimes communicates with outside figures (specifically, Jack Womack and Bono, who was also being filmed at the time, the final product being superimposed on an electronic billboard).

In the film, while recounting his childhood near Conway, South Carolina, Gibson reflects on his early works, saying:

I'm not a didactic writer, I hope. There's nothing I want less to be than someone couching a conscious message in prose fiction. But, I think one of the things that I see when I look back at my earlier work is a struggle to recognize and accept that the heart is the master and the head is the servant. And that that is always the case... except when it isn't the case we're in deep, deep trouble. And we're often in deep, deep trouble."

== Cinematography ==
The entire documentary revolves around footage taken from the car, either from front-facing cameras (presumably mounted near the dashboard or on the actual chassis) or from internally mounted ones, fitted to center on Gibson, who sits in the back seat of the limousine. Only on one occasion does he leave the car, to wander up and down a favourite beach, and here he is also filmed, providing one of the documentary's iconic images, that of a weathered monochromatic Gibson in a long black coat being buffeted by the strong coastal breeze. Neale consistently plays with the recorded footage, reversing sections of the film while keeping others playing or stopping them entirely, fading between similar but fundamentally different pieces of footage, and even at one point combining footage of Gibson with the screen of an antique television as he describes the advent of television in the Southern United States.

In The End of Celluloid (2004), historian of digital art Matt Hanson argues that No Maps was a film that could not have been made before the advent of digital technology.

== Release and reception ==
No Maps was released by Docurama and had its world premiere at the Vancouver International Film Festival in October 2000 with the United States premiere at the Slamdance Film Festival in January 2001. The documentary subsequently hit the independent film festival circuit, with screenings at South by Southwest in Austin, Texas (March 2001), Grauman's Egyptian Theatre in Los Angeles (March 2001); onedotzero at the Institute of Contemporary Arts, London (May 2001), the Carlton Arts Festival in São Paulo (June 2001), the Oldenburg International Film Festival in Germany (September 2001), and at onedotzero Japan (November 2001).

The film critics of the New Times LA and the Riverfront Times of St. Louis, Missouri recognised the film as the best documentary of 2001, with the latter commenting "Gibson's writing is often tedious, but the man proves articulate and compelling, especially when seated in the back of a car that appears to be driving across different dimensions." Postcyberpunk novelist Cory Doctorow, reviewing the film for Wired magazine, concluded "Nostalgic without being maudlin, No Maps for These Territories is a one-man show with revelations every minute". Reviewer Merle Bertrand of Film Threat was unenthused by the premise of the film, but found that "its rapid-fire editing, mystically brooding yet ironic atmosphere, and eerie soundtrack keeps it from ever becoming dull" despite its repetitive treatment of the subject matter, and ultimately hailed the documentary as "a brilliant and intelligent viewing experience".

In the run-up to the release of Gibson's ninth novel Spook Country in summer 2007, publisher Penguin Books announced their intent to screen the "fine and strange" documentary in the virtual world Second Life.
