= Hitting the Apex (2015 film) =

2015 documentary film by Mark Neale

- Directed by: Mark Neale
- Written by: Mark Neale
- Produced by: Mark Neale; Brad Pitt
- Starring: Jorge Lorenzo; Marc Márquez; Dani Pedrosa; Valentino Rossi; Marco Simoncelli; Casey Stoner
- Narrated by: Brad Pitt
- Cinematography: Grant Gee; Christopher Norr; Jan Zabeil
- Edited by: Mark Neale; Bruce Ashley; Jerry Chater
- Music by: Tomandandy
- Production company: The First Movie Company
- Distributed by: Universal Pictures
- Release date: September 2, 2015
- Running time: 138 minutes
- Country: United Kingdom
- Language: English

Hitting the Apex is a 2015 British documentary film by Mark Neale, narrated by Brad Pitt. It chronicles the careers of six Grand Prix motorcycle road racers competing in MotoGP: Valentino Rossi, Jorge Lorenzo, Dani Pedrosa, Casey Stoner, Marc Márquez, and Marco Simoncelli. Produced by Neale in collaboration with MotoGP rights holder Dorna Sports, the documentary was developed using extensive archival race footage as well as interviews conducted in English, Spanish and Italian over the 2010–2013 MotoGP seasons. It covers events such as Simoncelli's death in a 2011 racing incident, Stoner's shocking 2012 retirement, and Márquez's maiden MotoGP championship in 2013.

The documentary received a special screening in Silverstone on 28 August 2015, ahead of the British Grand Prix. On 2 September 2015, it received a wider theatrical release in the United Kingdom and United States, followed by expansion to other territories.

== Cast ==
- Brad Pitt as Narrator
- Jorge Lorenzo as Himself
- Marc Márquez as Himself
- Dani Pedrosa as Himself
- Valentino Rossi as Himself
- Marco Simoncelli as Himself
- Casey Stoner as Himself
- Jose Manuel Lorenzo as Himself
- Graziano Rossi as Himself
- Paolo Simoncelli as Himself

== Synopsis ==
Marco Simoncelli is a popular but aggressive rider who joins MotoGP in 2010 and initially struggles to adapt. He is involved in a racing incident with Jorge Lorenzo, and they argue about it in a press conference. Lorenzo complains that Simoncelli is dangerous, but Simoncelli laughs it off. His friend Rossi warns him to be more cautious. At the 2011 race in France, Simoncelli crashes into Dani Pedrosa, who breaks his collarbone and is forced to miss three races. Simoncelli is widely criticised, and tones down his aggression. Casey Stoner wins the 2011 championship. At the next race in Malaysia, Simoncelli, Rossi, and Colin Edwards are involved in an accident which results in Simoncelli's death. The riders attend his funeral in Italy, and pay tribute to him.

Nine-time champion Rossi has moved to the Italian team Ducati for the 2011 season. The bike is slow, and Rossi's results are bad. At the race in Spain, Rossi is challenging for victory when he crashes and takes Stoner with him. An irritated Stoner tells him that "your ambition outweighed your talent". Rossi continues to struggle on the Ducati throughout 2011 and 2012, upsetting his loyal fans. Stoner shockingly announces that he will retire after the 2012 season. He is only 27 years old, but is uncomfortable with the media obligations involved in a MotoGP career. He injures his ankle, losing his last chance at another championship. Lorenzo wins the 2012 championship.

The grid lineup changes for the 2013 season. Rossi returns to his old team Yamaha, hoping for better results. Meanwhile, Stoner's retirement leaves a bike available at Honda. It is given to Marc Márquez, a 20-year old rookie touted as the "next Rossi". Despite his talent, he is regarded like Simoncelli as a controversially aggressive rider. At the second race in Texas, Márquez becomes the youngest race winner in MotoGP history. At the third race in Spain, the final corner of the track is named in Lorenzo's honour for his birthday. On the final lap of the race, Márquez overtakes Lorenzo at Lorenzo Corner, pushing him out wide. Lorenzo is furious, but an amused Rossi defends Márquez.

Márquez wants to find the limits of his new bike as quickly as possible, which involves lots of crashing. During practice in Italy, he records the fastest-ever MotoGP crash at 209.9 mph (337.9km/h). Rossi also crashes, to the dismay of his home fans. In the Netherlands, Lorenzo cracks his collarbone in practice. He flies to Barcelona for surgery, and competes in the race 36 hours later. Rossi claims his first victory in over two years, delighting the crowd. In practice in Germany, championship leader Lorenzo aggravates his injury and withdraws from the race. Second-placed Pedrosa also breaks his collarbone and withdraws. Márquez wins four races in a row and becomes the new championship leader. At Laguna Seca, Márquez replicates a controversial move Rossi once pulled on Stoner on Rossi himself. Rossi jokingly mimics strangling Márquez in parc fermé.

Lorenzo and Márquez fight for the championship, with Pedrosa usually occupying the third podium spot and Rossi pushed into fourth. Lorenzo wins the final race in Valencia, but Márquez's third place finish is enough to ensure he becomes the youngest MotoGP champion in history. Simoncelli's father founds a racing team to compete in honour of his son. An epilogue describes what happened to the other riders in 2014: Márquez won the championship again in dominant style; Rossi finished runner-up at age 35; Lorenzo third and Pedrosa fourth. Márquez's younger brother won the Moto3 championship, and Stoner went fishing.

== Reception ==
Writing for The Guardian, Mike McCahill gave the film 2 out of 5 stars, writing that "director Mark Neale ekes out traces of personality ... but any drama is limited to the track: its grip depends entirely on your interest in watching men leaning at high speed." He also criticised the film's "lax edit".

The film was more positively appraised by motorcycle-focused publications, some of which cited it as one of the best MotoGP documentaries available.

== See also ==
- Grand Prix motorcycle racing
- 2011 Grand Prix motorcycle racing season
- 2012 MotoGP World Championship
- 2013 MotoGP World Championship
