= Chris Paine =

American filmmaker and environmental activist

Paine

Chris Paine is an American filmmaker and environmental activist. His notable works as director include the documentaries Who Killed the Electric Car?, Revenge of the Electric Car and Do You Trust This Computer? Paine received a nomination for the Writers Guild of America Award for Best Documentary Screenplay for Who Killed the Electric Car?

== Career ==
Paine served as Executive Producer on the documentaries Faster, William Gibson: No Maps for these Territories and Charge directed by Mark Neale and Bike vs Cars directed by Fredrik Gertten. Other producing projects include MTV Europe's Buzz and shorts including Mailman and Zoo Life. Paine worked for writer/director Michael Tolkin on the feature films The Rapture, The Player, and The New Age.

== Environment ==
Chris serves on the board of directors for Friends of the Earth and worked on campaigns to end nuclear detonations at the Nevada Test Site and to stop a freeway with a proposed Tunnel in northern California. In 2010, his team won three Webby awards for Counterspill an online project about fossil fuel energy spills.

== Education ==
Paine studied acting at the Neighborhood Playhouse with Sanford Meisner, and film at New York University and Stanford University. He is a graduate of Colgate University.

== Entrepreneur ==
In 1984, with high-school classmate Roger Gilbertson, Paine co-founded Mondo-tronics, which designed an actuator for the Mars Pathfinder mission and sold materials direct to the public as "The Robot Store". In 1994, Chris founded Internet Outfitters which he took public as part of Commerce One in 2000.

== Filmography ==
Director:

- "Who Killed the Electric Car?" (2006)
- "Revenge of the Electric Car" (2011)
- "Do You Trust This Computer?" (2018)

Executive Producer:

- "Bikes vs Cars" (2015)
- Charge (2010)
- Faster (2003)
- No Maps for These Territories (2001)

Miscellaneous Crew:

- The New Age (1994)
- The Player (1992)
