= Faster (2003 film) =

2003 American documentary film by Mark Neale

- Directed by: Mark Neale
- Written by: Mark Neale
- Produced by: Mark Neale; Ian MacLean; Chris Paine
- Starring: Valentino Rossi; Max Biaggi; Garry McCoy; John Hopkins
- Narrated by: Ewan McGregor
- Cinematography: Grant Gee
- Edited by: Rochelle Watson
- Music by: tomandandy
- Distributed by: Slamdance on the Road
- Release date: November 16, 2003 (Cannes Film Festival)
- Running time: 103 minutes
- Countries: United States; Spain
- Language: English

Faster is a 2003 documentary film about the MotoGP motorcycle road racing world championship. Filmed between 2001 and 2002 by director Mark Neale, it features cinematography by music video director Grant Gee and is narrated by Ewan McGregor. The film was succeeded by a 2-disc "Ultimate Collector's Edition" re-release in 2004 which included this film and the short sequel called Faster & Faster filmed between 2003 and 2004. Subsequently, in 2006, The Doctor, The Tornado and The Kentucky Kid (or DTK) was released, followed by Fastest in 2011 and Hitting the Apex in 2015.

== Overview ==
The film spotlights the MotoGP world championship, the premiere level of motorcycle road racing, which is a series of sixteen races on five continents contested by twenty-four riders. The film includes appearances by Valentino Rossi, Max Biaggi, Australian veteran Garry McCoy and young American John Hopkins. Several former world champions are interviewed, including Mick Doohan, Kevin Schwantz, paralyzed former racer Wayne Rainey, Kenny Roberts and Barry Sheene.

The film depicts the bitter rivalry between Max Biaggi and Valentino Rossi. Their personality clash is captured in television interviews and they lock horns both on and off the track.

Sections of the film feature Dr. Claudio Costa, a physician who follows the riders from track to track. Costa lends his unique style to mending broken bones and advising riders on their suitability to put their broken bodies back out on the track.

Garry McCoy's unique style is portrayed. McCoy somehow manages to spin up his rear tire while braking into corners. Despite breaking the "rules of riding" McCoy manages to nab fastest lap times and win races with his impossible style.

The film was produced by Los Angeles-based Spark Productions in association with Dorna Sports SL, the rights-holder for MotoGP, and shot around the world between 2001 and 2002. It was executive produced by Neale, Ian MacLean and Chris Paine.

The film premiered at Cannes in 2003.

=== Notable appearances ===
- Max Biaggi
- Loris Capirossi
- Carlos Checa
- Mick Doohan
- Colin Edwards
- Noriyuki Haga
- Nicky Hayden
- John Hopkins
- Eddie Lawson
- Randy Mamola
- Garry McCoy
- Shinya Nakano
- Kenny Roberts
- Wayne Rainey
- Valentino Rossi
- Kevin Schwantz
- Barry Sheene

== DVD ==
The film was released as a 2-disc DVD on November 16, 2004. In addition to the movie, extras include on-board camera footage from actual races, and a short sequel film called Faster & Faster on events after 2003 and the early stages of the 2004 season which mainly focused on Valentino Rossi's transition from Honda to Yamaha.
