= Do You Trust This Computer? =

- Directed by: Chris Paine
- Written by: Mark Monroe
- Produced by: Tiffany Asakawa; Jessie Deeter
- Cinematography: Thaddeus Wadleigh
- Edited by: Paul Crowder; Lauren Saffa
- Music by: Matter
- Production company: Papercut Films
- Release date: April 5, 2018
- Running time: 78 minutes
- Country: United States
- Language: English

Do You Trust This Computer? is a 2018 American documentary film directed by Chris Paine that outlines the benefits and especially the dangers of artificial intelligence. It features interviews with a range of prominent individuals relevant to AI, such as Ray Kurzweil, Elon Musk, Jerry Kaplan, Michal Kosinski, D. Scott Phoenix, Hiroshi Ishiguro, and Jonathan Nolan. The film was directed by Chris Paine, known for Who Killed the Electric Car? (2006) and the subsequent follow up, Revenge of the Electric Car (2011).

Topics covered range from military drones to AI-powered "fake news" feeds. At one point while being interviewed, Musk warns that any human dictator will eventually die, but that a digital superintelligence could someday become an "immortal dictator from which we can never escape". Musk also sponsored free streaming of the film on Vimeo during the weekend of April 7, 2018. The film was featured at the 2018 Napa Film Festival.

The documentary is dedicated to Stephen Hawking, who warned that humanity may be jeopardized by its pursuit of a superintelligent AI.

== See also ==
- Artificial Intelligence
- Ethics of artificial intelligence
- Lethal autonomous weapon
- AI takeover
- OpenAI
