= Raygun Gothic Rocketship =

Sculpture

The Raygun Gothic Rocketship is a retro-futurist art sculpture in the shape of a giant rocketship. It was created by Bay Area artists Nathaniel Taylor, Sean Orlando, and David Shulman.

The exhibit stands 40 feet tall and weighs 13,000 pounds. The ship was built with 3 walkable decks. The interior is divided into the Engine Room & Life-Sciences Bio Lab, Crew Quarters & Navigation, and the upper Flight Deck and pilot chair. The interior includes artistic details such as captured "alien specimens" and a zero gravity bed. Creating the rocket required the work of 85 artists, engineers, fabricators, scientists and computer engineers.

The creators described the art as "a future-rustic vision of yesterday’s tomorrow". A San Francisco newspaper said it "offers a retro-futuristic, highly-stylized vision of space travel".

The Rocket was originally created as an art installation for the 2009 Burning Man Festival in Black Rock Desert, Nevada. In 2010 it was moved and featured at a Yuri's Night celebration at NASA Ames Research Center, as well as a second appearance at the Bay Area Maker Faire. Later in 2010 the Rocket was moved and installed as a temporary art exhibit at Pier 14 in San Francisco. It remained standing in San Francisco for 14 months.

Today, the Rocketship is permanently installed on the site of the former Lowry Air Force Base in Denver, Colorado, which was redeveloped in the 1990's into a new Denver, master-planned community known as the Lowry Neighborhood. The rocket sits atop a custom-built kiosk which houses the Rocket Ice Cream Shop. The Rocket installation is part of the historic Hangar 2 adaptive re-use project, which is now a retail center and is also adjacent to the historic Hangar 1, which houses the Wings Over the Rockies Air and Space Museum.
