= A Swarm of Angels =

A Swarm of Angels (ASOA) was an open source film project and participatory film community, whose aim was to make the world's first Internet-funded, crewed and distributed feature film. The collaborative project aimed to attract 50,000 individual subscribers (the "Swarm of Angels"), each contributing £25 to the production, but after three years only 1,000 subscriptions were made. This feature film and associated original media project embraces the Creative Commons notion of flexible copyright licensing, to permit people to freely download, share, and remix the original media made for the project.

A Swarm of Angels is the brainchild of film producer and author Matt Hanson, founder of the onedotzero digital film festival. He has labelled the process Cinema 2.0. It would be the first time for a project of this scale to be funded, produced and distributed in this way.

Advisors to A Swarm of Angels include science fiction author and copyright activist Cory Doctorow, graphic novelist Warren Ellis, pioneer digital film producer Tommy Pallotta, and musical mashup artist Eric Kleptone of The Kleptones.

== Participation ==
A Swarm of Angels is recruiting a community capped at 50,000. Members can have a say in the script development. Two scripts are being developed, with one to be chosen by ASOA members to be produced. The scripts were being developed via the project forum and are entitled, The Unfold, and The Ravages (formerly known as Glitch). According to the official website, the first two A Swarm of Angels are "likely to be thriller based with soft sci-fi elements."

The project had its first voting day on 21 September 2006, where members were polled on certain decisions via their forum, The Nine Orders.

== Recognition ==
The project won the R&D/Innovation category Britain's Digital Elite awards (sponsored by Real Business magazine and Microsoft) in October 2007.

The project was nominated for the May 2006 "Next Big Web Thing" award, which it subsequently won.

== Challenges ==
After gaining big interest and participation levels during the first year in which the project was launched, development has slowed significantly in 2008.

In early 2009 the official webpage was taken offline to reset the project information for the next phase of production and collaboration. This was in direct response to criticism of the information density and the slow progress of the project, with subsequent difficulty in engagement for new users.

During the 3 years the website was online, about 1000 people registered as angels. The target of 50.000 is unlikely to be reached.

Project updates have been continuing via micro-blog updates. The Nine Orders forum appears to have been discontinued and has since been hijacked by malware promoters.

== Additional sources ==
- "50,000 angels will fund £1 million film". BoingBoing. May 2006. Archived from the original on 2006-05-17.
- "Swarm of Angels circle Cinema 2.0". The Register. May 2006.
- "Kleptones podcast for A Swarm of Angels". Boing Boing. December 2006.
- "A Swarm of Angels: crowdsourcing film production". The Social Web: ZDNet. March 2007. Archived from the original on 2009-04-25.
- "10 People to Change the World: Open-Source Cinema - Matt Hanson". Forbes.com. May 2007.
- "Open source film project moves on". The Social Web: ZDNet. June 2007. Archived from the original on 2007-10-10.
- "Open Source: The Future of Film?". Fast Company. February 2008.
- Hart, Hugh (July 2008). "Swarm of Angels Posts Open-Source Movie Trailer". Underwire. Wired Blog.
- "Remarkable Real World Open Source Projects". OSLiving. December 2008. Archived from the original on 2009-05-04.
