= MotoGP 26 =

2026 video game

- Official PS5 cover art
- Developer: Milestone S.r.l.
- Publisher: Milestone S.r.l.
- Series: MotoGP
- Engine: Unreal Engine 5
- Platforms: Nintendo Switch; Nintendo Switch 2; PlayStation 5; Windows; Xbox Series X/S
- Release: WW: April 29, 2026
- Genre: Racing
- Modes: Single-player, multiplayer

MotoGP 26 is a racing video game developed and published by Milestone S.r.l.

The game was released on April 29, 2026.

== Features ==
The game fearues a 3D-paddock-based Career Mode. Modes from previous games, including Race Off return. The game also features a 22-player Online Multiplayer mode.

== Reception ==
Reception

Aggregate scores
Aggregator	Score
Metacritic	(PS5) 75/100 (PC) 78/100
OpenCritic	71% recommend

The PlayStation 5 and PC versions of MotoGP 26 both received generally favorable reviews from critics, according to the review aggregation website Metacritic. Fellow review aggregator OpenCritic assessed that the game received strong approval, being recommended by 71% of critics.
