= Reverend Gadget =

Artist and television personality

Gregory Abbott (known as Reverend Gadget)
- Occupation(s): Artist, TV Personality, Crafstman

Gregory Abbott, known professionally as Reverend Gadget, is a steel fabrication artist, craftsman, prop builder and television personality based in Los Angeles, California. He is best known to television audiences as part of the build team on the short-lived Discovery Channel series Big! and has more recently been part of their other series Monster House and Smash Lab. He is currently working with EarthxTV on his own series Reverend Gadget's Garage – also known as Gadget's World – in which he shows his advocation of alternative energy sources by converting gasoline-powered vehicles to electricity.

Abbott took the name "Reverend Gadget" to reflect both his craftsman works and the fact that he has been an ordained minister since 1986.

== Early life and education ==
Abbott was born in Torrance, California. He attended one year of college at Menlo College before dropping out. More than half a decade later he returned to school to study economics and business at Santa Monica College as well as computer programming at UCLA.

== Career ==
Abbot is the CEO and president of Left Coast EV. In 2011, Gadget was part of a documentary titled Revenge of the Electric Car.

== Recognition ==
He currently holds 10 Guinness World Records for his works, some of which were with the Big! build team.
