= Motion Blur: Graphic Moving Imagemakers =

2004 book by Shane Walter and Matt Hanson

- Genre: Filmmaking
- Publication date: 2004

Motion Blur: Graphic Moving Image Makers, also titled Motion Blur: Onedotzero's Adventures in Moving Image, is a book published by Laurence King Publishing in 2004. Produced by Shane Walter and Matt Hanson of onedotzero and designed by Philip O'Dwyer, it features visuals including photography, screenshots, and storyboards, as well as interviews with, 28 multimedia artists and graphic houses. It also includes a two-hour DVD featuring a number of videos created by the aforementioned artists.

The first edition of the book and DVD were housed in a foam cover, with the phrase onedotzero cut through the foam in a stencil fashion; the reprint does not include this cover.

The interviews explore the inspirations and creative processes used by the various artists, groups and graphics houses, as well as looking into their history. The text is accompanied by a vast range of still shots from videos and animations they have produced. The book can easily be thought of as a classic example of a coffee table book.

The book also features two essays entitled "The Seduction of Moving Image" by Shane Walter and "The End of Celluloid" by Matt Hanson.

== Featured artists and graphic houses ==
The following artists/graphic houses are featured in the book:

- Caviar/Tycoon Graphics
- Geoffroy De Crécy
- Drawing and Manual
- Eyeballnyc
- Felt
- Richard Fenwick
- Furi Furi
- Groovisions
- H5
- Johnny Hardstaff
- Hexstatic
- Jeremy Hollister
- Tim Hope
- Kuntzel + Deygas
- Le Cabinet
- Logan
- Geoff McFetridge
- Psyop
- Alexander Rutterford
- Shynola
- Stylewar
- Sweden
- Tanaka Hideyuki
- Tanaka Noriyuki
- Tanida Ichiro
- Teevee Graphics
- The Light Surgeons
- Zetguised

== DVD ==
The DVD provides accompanying videos for 26 of the 28 featured artists/graphic houses – Caviar/Tycoon Graphics and Teevee Graphics do not appear.

== Reception ==
Design Week called the first Motion Blur "a lavish book...cataloguing the best international digital moving image work".

== Further books ==
A second book, Motion Blur 2: Multidimensional Moving Imagemakers was published in 2008 written by Shane Walter also published by Laurence King. In a review for Design Week, Fiona Sibley wrote, "High-definition stills drip sultry aesthetics across every page, making this a visual cornucopia of a book to flick through, and interviews with every artist provide insightful commentary to the works."
