= Smash Lab =

- Created by: Korelan Cone; Philip Lott
- Starring: Deanne Bell; Chuck Messer; Nick Blair (season 1); Kevin Cook (season 1); Reverend Gadget (season 2); Nathaniel Taylor (season 2)
- Narrated by: Ben Bailey (US, season 2 only); Tony Hirst (UK)
- Country of origin: United States
- Original language: English
- No. of seasons: 2
- No. of episodes: 20

Production
- Camera setup: Multiple runtime = 45 minutes

Original release
- Network: Discovery Channel
- Release: December 26, 2007 – May 1, 2009

Smash Lab is a reality television series that premiered on December 26, 2007, on the Discovery Channel. The idea of the show is to take everyday technology and test it in "extraordinary ways".

The show started broadcasting in the UK on March 3, 2014, on Discovery Turbo and April 7 on Community Channel with Tony Hirst as the narrator. Discovery Turbo only aired 10 episodes, whereas Community Channel showed all 20 episodes.

== Cast ==
The Smash Lab team is composed of Deanne Bell (scientist), Chuck Messer (engineer), Nick Blair (designer, season 1 only), Kevin Cook (creative expert, season 1 only), Reverend Gadget (fabricator, season 2 only), and Nathaniel Taylor (artisan, season 2 only). Blair has a degree in industrial design, and both Bell and Cook have degrees in mechanical engineering. Messer has an undergraduate degree in industrial engineering as well as a graduate degree in industrial design.

== Episodes ==
=== Season 1 (2007–08) ===
Smash Lab premiered on December 26, 2007. The Smash Lab team for season one was composed of Deanne Bell, Chuck Messer, Nick Blair, and Kevin Cook.

No. overall	No. in season	Title	Original release date
1	1	"Blast Proof House"	December 26, 2007
The team use Rhino Lining in various tests. The most noted is bomb proofing a building on the inner and outer wall layers. Another test involved 2 pickup trucks - One with Rhino Lining, and one without. This was to prove or disprove manufacturing claims. The test was confirmed since the Rhino Lining sprayed truck held up against the impact of explosion. This was shown as part of Discovery Channel's Sneak Peek Week.
2	2	"Crash Absorbing Concrete"	January 16, 2008
The team attempt to stop an uncontrolled car from crossing a freeway median using "aerated concrete". Two methods of employing this material are used. Chuck and Kevin tried building aerated concrete blocks to be placed roadside. Nick and Deanne constructed a large aerated concrete bed for a vehicle to drive over. Neither is successful in stopping the vehicle. The aerated concrete roadside blocks actually made a car more able to jump into oncoming traffic and produced a large amount of debris, and the bed is completely destroyed by the vehicle, making it unsuitable for repeat use.
3	3	"Hurricane Proof House"	January 23, 2008
The team set out to build a hurricane-proof house and end up using carbon fiber to 'wrap' a mobile home which subsequently withstand the force of a 140mph wind from a jet aircraft exhaust. The mobile home rolls over under the most extreme wind forces due to poor anchoring by the team - but remains intact. They use an air cannon to fire debris at the mobile home - which is lightly damaged by the debris (and flipped upside down due to a faulty tether). The cost-feasibility of applying costly carbon fiber to mobile homes, built expressly with low cost in mind, is not adequately explored.
4	4	"Train Crash"	January 30, 2008
The team tries to use giant airbags on the front of a train to push cars safely out of the way. They do have some success, but the ideas are not practical or effective enough for everyday use. The final test of their idea flipped the test car, likely causing significantly more damage to the vehicle and injury to the driver than an unmodified train.
5	5	"Earthquake Proof House"	February 6, 2008
The team tries to find ways to make a house more resistant to earthquake crumble. They split into pairs to devise ways to resolve this problem. The winning idea was to use base isolation, a method already in production use for decades. This plan actually stood up to a full 10.0 sim quake. The cost-effectiveness of base isolating single-family homes is not explored.
6	6	"High Rise Escape"	February 13, 2008
The team evaluates two competing designs for a high rise fire escape system. The goal is to move escapees toward the ground safely and smoothly, yet faster than they could descend a traditional fire escape. Both tested systems include a self-contained motion damping device in the form of a magnetic rail brake featuring a Halbach array of rare-earth magnets. The winning design is tested by team member Chuck Messer on a 90-foot vertical drop.
7	7	"Forest Fire"	February 20, 2008
The team tries to flameproof a house using aerogel powder and carbon fiber blankets. The building ends up nearly working, but loose threads light the house on fire. This method also proved to be extremely costly. A moderately sized house would have cost in excess of $60,000.00 in materials alone.
8	8	"Runaway Trailer"	February 27, 2008
The team investigates if you can stop a runaway trailer with truck using rockets. After testing 3 ways of using the rockets, a direct backwards-facing trailer-mounted system is used. A glitch in the firing system results in premature ignition, ending the experiment and nearly seriously injuring a crew member. It became obvious that rockets are highly unsuitable for use on roadways.
9	9	"Fluidized Sand"	March 5, 2008
The team takes fluidized sand from a parts cleaner and experiments with other uses. The technology incorporates blowing air through a bed of sand at a specific pressure and speed, which turns a solid bed of sand into liquid-like instant quicksand. The idea is to use it as a crime deterrent. The team stages a robbery, and then makes improvements as the show progresses. The final test proves it can be used as a defensive road barrier as well. In real-world use, there would be issues with compaction over time and getting soaked with water.
10	10	"Long Range Life Boat"	March 19, 2008
The team decides to drop a boat from a plane to test to see if you could rescue somebody out at sea. A helicopter that could carry 1200 lbs was actually used for the test. After two misses the team had to change their release gear slightly but the test proved to work in the end.
11	11	"CO_{2} Cop Car"	March 26, 2008
The team decides to test if they can use CO_{2} in a high-speed chase by spraying CO_{2} into the grill of the criminals' car by getting in front of it. The idea looks promising, but turns out to be a flop.
12	12	"Boat Ejector Seat"	April 2, 2008
The team uses ways to escape speedboat crashes with a parachute. First Deanne and the guys tried to use a parachute to escape a car crash. Second the gang tried to deploy an underwater chute to slow down one boat before it crashed into another. The theory was to give people time to escape a head-on collision with another boat before the first one crashed into it.
13	13	"Bomb Proof Plane"	April 9, 2008
The team experiments with a special bubble wrap that contains fire-suppressing material that is released when hit by a shockwave from a bomb. It is found the bubble wrap must be backed by a strong material so the shockwave will rip the bubbles open. They attempt to bomb-proof a plane but the test actually didn't improve on the amount of damage the plane took. It somewhat suppressed the fireball, but did nothing for the blast pressure wave, which still blew a large section of the fuselage open.

=== Season 2 (2008) ===
Smash Lab was picked up for a second season with episodes beginning August 5, 2008. For the second season, two team members changed: Nick Blair and Kevin Cook were replaced by Reverend Gadget and Nathaniel Taylor (artisan). Gadget has appeared on other Discovery Channel shows, including Big! and Monster House. This season is narrated by comedian Ben Bailey, host of Cash Cab. The show was not renewed for a third season.

No. overall	No. in season	Title	Original release date
14	1	"Car Over a Cliff"	August 5, 2008
The team measures to prevent injuries for passengers in a speeding car that careens off a road, plummets into a ravine and bursts into flames include Chuck and Gadget devise exterior airbags for a car; Deanne and Nathaniel test stabilizing rods.
15	2	"Unbreakable Car"	August 12, 2008
Can a car survive a 55 MPH crash? The team tries various ways to make a car crash-proof, for both side and front impact collisions.
16	3	"Extreme Snow Plow"	May 1, 2009
The team comes up with two designs to get help when the car is covered in tons of snow. Chuck and Gadget create a jet engine sled; Deanne and Nathaniel create a hot air balloon prototype. Note: This episode was originally scheduled to air sometime between August 12, 2008, and September 4, 2008. After the show was canceled, Discovery aired the episode on May 1, 2009, at 3:00PM ET.
17	4	"Unsinkable Car"	August 26, 2008
Chuck and Nathaniel try to make a car unsinkable. Deanne and Gadget try to figure out a way to get back on a cruise ship after falling overboard.
18	5	"Runaway Big Rig"	September 4, 2008
The team brainstorms ways to stop a hijacked 18-wheeler. Included: jamming the wheels; using technology from aircraft carriers.
19	6	"Trapped in a Boat"	September 11, 2008
Inspired by the Poseidon Adventure, the Smash Lab crew find themselves trapped in a capsized boat. Chuck and Gadget decide the only way out is down and build a collapsible submarine, while Deanne and Nathaniel go up and cut their way to freedom.
20	7	"Crash-Proof Log Hauler"	September 18, 2008
An accident with a logging truck has the team using vacuum power and a motorised gyro rig to keep a truck from tipping over.
