= Deanne Bell =

American television personality

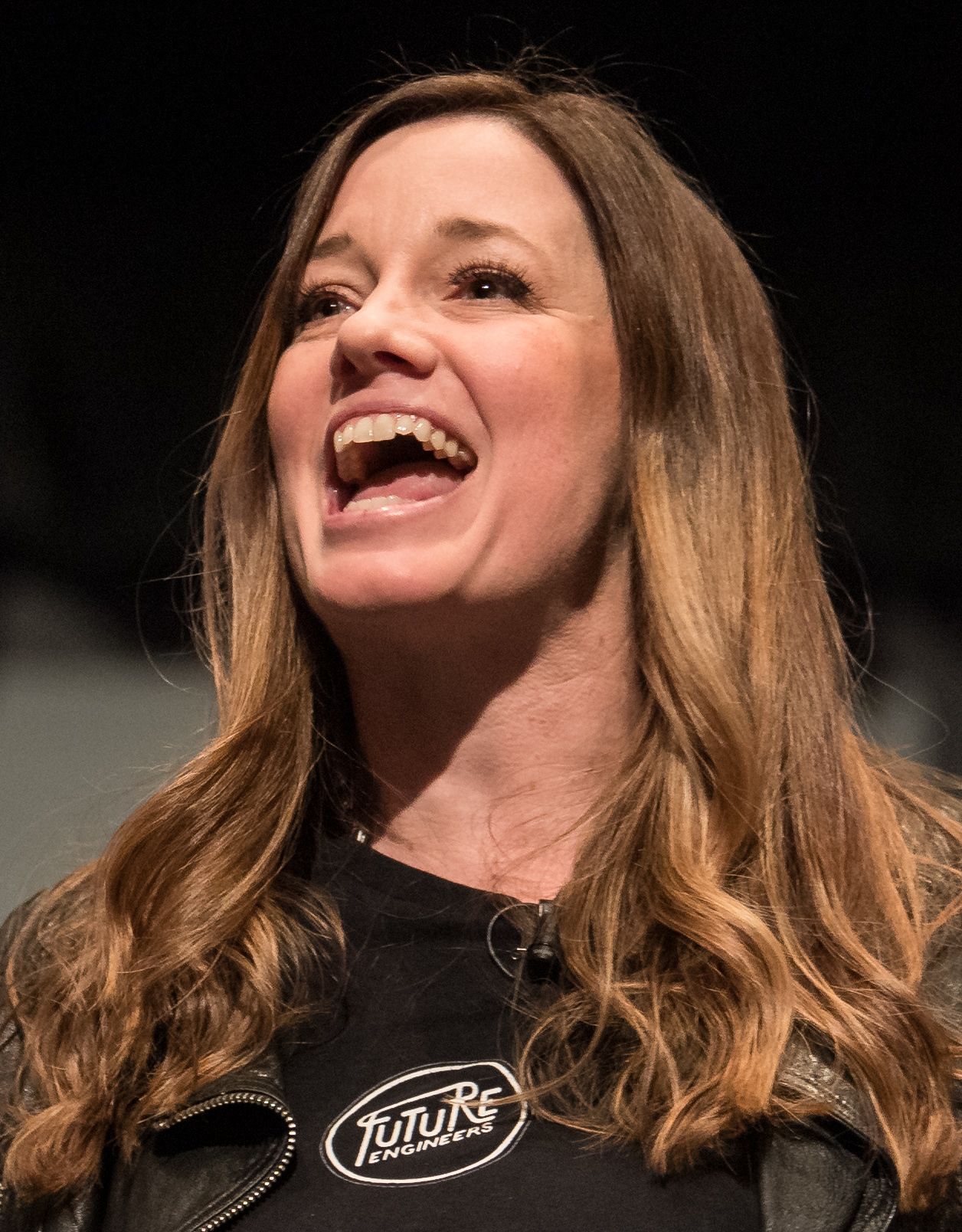
- Bell in 2020
- Born: Palm Bay, Florida
- Education: Washington University in St. Louis
- Occupations: Mechanical engineer and TV personality
- Known for: Hosting numerous TV shows
- Website: www.deannebell.com

Deanne Bell is an American television personality and engineer.

== Career ==
Prior to her media career, Deanne designed optomechanics for military aircraft sensors in Los Angeles and worked as a senior application engineer for a software startup in Boston. She has previously worked on PBS's Design Squad, Discovery Channel's Smash Lab, and National Geographic's "The Egyptian Job". She has also co-hosted DIY Network's "Money Hunters" and ESPN's "Rise Up."

Bell is originally from Palm Bay, Florida. In 2002, she graduated from Washington University in St. Louis, with a Bachelor of Science in mechanical engineering and is the 2019 Young Alumni Award recipient for its McKelvey School of Engineering.

In 2014, Deanne founded Future Engineers, whose partnership with NASA and the American Society of Mechanical Engineers Foundation hosts a series of student invention challenges as a joint commitment to the White House Maker Initiative. As part of the first challenge, students were asked to create a digital 3D model of a space tool, and the winning design was 3D printed aboard the International Space Station.
