= Mark Neale =

British film director

- Occupations: Documentarian; film director
- Notable work: No Maps for These Territories (2000)

Mark Neale is a British documentarian and film director based in Los Angeles, California. His best-known work is the 2000 documentary No Maps for These Territories, which profiled cyberpunk author William Gibson. Prior to No Maps, Neale had been an acclaimed music video director, making videos for artists such as U2, Paul Weller and Counting Crows. In 2003, Neale wrote and directed Faster, a documentary on the MotoGP motorcycle racing world championship, and its sequel The Doctor, the Tornado and the Kentucky Kid in 2006.

== Filmography ==
- Mojo Working: Jimi Hendrix (1992)
- No Maps for These Territories (2000)
- Faster (2003)
- Faster & Faster (2004)
- The Doctor, the Tornado and the Kentucky Kid (2006)
- Charge, Zero Emissions/Maximum Speed (2011)
- Fastest (2011)
- Hitting The Apex (2015)

== Videography ==
- U2 — "Lemon" (1993)
