= Christian Wloch =

Christian Wloch (born 1971 in Buenos Aires) is an Argentinian artist. Wloch trained in visual arts, film, video, multimedia and new technologies. Through visual and audio compositions explores geometric interdimensional universes generated from the light, sound and perception.

== Bibliography ==
- Ana Claudia Garcia, "Linkages in / with space", "Christian Wloch, Link," "Art and New Technologies" Sixth Edition "Buenos Aires Museum of Modern Art-FT, 4/5/2010
- Magdalena Jitrik, "Christian Wloch, The desire to reach the light," "wiggle Projection" Fundación Proa, 02/20/2005
