= Revenge of the Electric Car =

- Directed by: Chris Paine
- Written by: Chris Paine; P. G. Morgan
- Produced by: Stefano Durdic; P. G. Morgan; Jessie Deeter; Dana Moreau; Michelle Kaffko
- Starring: Elon Musk; Carlos Ghosn; Bob Lutz; Greg Abbott; Dan Neil
- Narrated by: Tim Robbins
- Cinematography: Thaddeus Wadleigh
- Edited by: Chris A. Peterson
- Music by: David Robbins; Raul Campos; Chris Paul
- Release date: April 22, 2011 (Tribeca)
- Running time: 88 minutes
- Country: United States
- Language: English

Revenge of the Electric Car is a 2011 American feature documentary film by Chris Paine, who also directed Who Killed the Electric Car?. The documentary, executive produced by Stefano Durdic, and produced by PG Morgan and Jessie Deeter, had its world premiere at the 2011 Tribeca Film Festival on Earth Day, April 22, 2011. The theatrical release to the public took place on October 21, 2011.

== Synopsis ==
Revenge follows four entrepreneurs from 2007 through the end of 2010 as they fight to bring the electric car back to the world market in the midst of the 2008 global recession. The filmmakers had unprecedented access to Tesla, Inc. CEO Elon Musk during the time period in which Musk and Tesla suffered several grave setbacks to the dream of a car company without gasoline. His foils include the charismatic Bob Lutz, vice chairman of General Motors during its 2008 bankruptcy, due in part to its focus on trucks and SUVs instead of fuel efficient and electric cars. Musk and Lutz also face Carlos Ghosn, the CEO credited with saving Renault-Nissan from near bankruptcy and who now had pledged $1 billion to beat Toyota to the pure electric game. A final character, steel fabrication artist, craftsman, prop builder and television personality Greg Abbott, who is known professionally as Reverend Gadget, makes the case for independent electric car conversions in California. Danny DeVito is also interviewed, as an electric car enthusiast and owner of a Chevrolet Volt and the earlier ill-fated General Motors EV1, as well as Internet entrepreneur and Tesla customer Jason Calacanis.

Whereas the 2006 film Who Killed the Electric Car? ended with the destruction of 5,000 electric cars from California's clean air program, notably the GM EV1, Revenge documents a new generation of electric cars that began production in the early 2010s, including the Chevrolet Volt, the Nissan Leaf, and the Tesla Roadster.

== Release and reception ==
The documentary premiered at the 2011 Tribeca Film Festival on Earth Day, April 22, 2011 with David Duchovny, Elon Musk, Carlos Ghosn, and Bob Lutz in person. The theatrical release took place on October 21, 2011, in Los Angeles and New York, followed by openings in major metropolitan areas.

Revenge of the Electric Car received mostly strong reviews. ABC's review praised the film, commenting, "As much as you expect it to be a story about technology, it's really a tale about people. ... [The four entrepreneurs'] stories are skillfully woven together, each presented in their own voice." USA Today wrote, "Revenge is a must-see movie for anyone interested in cars." The Guardian noted that the film "is more than just a snapshot of the gamesmanship behind the creation of mass-market vehicles. Revenge offers a look inside the minds of business leaders struggling through one of the most troubled periods of recent economic history. ... [It] captures rich natural tension as it unfolds."

The film premiered on television in PBS's Independent Lens series in 2012 and was encored again in 2013 to strong ratings given the expanding popularity and interest in Tesla Motors with the release of its subsequent Model S electric car. Scenes from the film were featured on CBS's 60 Minutes profile of Elon Musk with Bob Simon in 2014.

== See also ==
- Battery electric vehicle
- Electric vehicle
- General Motors EV1
- Great American Streetcar Scandal
