= Tomandandy =

American musical duo

- Origin: New York City, New York, U.S.
- Genres: Film score, soundtrack, trance music
- Years active: 1990-present
- Members: Andy Milburn; Thomas Hajdu
- Website: www.tomandandy.com

Tomandandy is an American musical duo from New York City, consisting of members Thomas Hajdu and Andy Milburn. While they are best known for their work scoring films, the duo has also produced music for television commercials and programs, records and art installations.

== Background ==
Andy Milburn was born in Texas and attended Princeton University. During that time, he contributed to the early computer music system called Real-time Cmix. Thomas Hajdu was born in Canada and moved to the United States to work on his graduate studies at Princeton University.

== Career ==
Milburn and Hajdu moved to New York after graduating and started collaborating with film director Mark Pellington at MTV and film editors Hank Corwin and Bruce Ashley in the UK. Soon their work was being used in commercials, TV shows, feature films, art installations and record projects. Tomandandy quickly grew and they built a number of recording studios in New York and later in Los Angeles.

In 1992, Tomandandy appeared on the Red Hot Organization's dance compilation album, Red Hot + Dance, contributing an original dance track, "Theme From Red Hot & Dance (Gothic Mix)." The album attempted to raise awareness and money in support of the AIDS epidemic, and all proceeds were donated to AIDS charities.

In 2009, Tomandandy won Best Horror Score (runner-up) in Fangoria's Chainsaw Award for their score to The Strangers.

In 2020, Tomandandy's Tom Hajdu reflected on The Strangers soundtrack during an interview.

== Selected discography ==
=== Other works ===
- Zoo TV: Live from Sydney (1994)
- "You'll Know You Were Loved" - Lou Reed from Friends Original TV Soundtrack - Reprise, 1995
- "In Our Sleep" - Laurie Anderson - Warner Bros., 1995
- "Cartridgemusic" from Offbeat: A Red Hot Soundtrip - TVT, 1996
- "It Goes Back" - David Byrne from Offbeat: A Red Hot Soundtrip - TVT, 1996
- United States of Poetry - PolyGram, 1996
- "Old Western Movies" - collaboration with William S. Burroughs from Kerouac: Kicks Joy Darkness - Ryko, 1997
- Family Tools (2013) (TV series theme)

=== Film scores ===
Year	Title	Director	Notes
1993	Killing Zoe	Roger Avary	
1995	Mr. Stitch	Roger Avary	Television film
1997	Going All the Way	Mark Pellington	
2000	Waking the Dead	Keith Gordon	Composed with Scott Shields
2002	The Mothman Prophecies	Mark Pellington	
2002	The Rules of Attraction	Roger Avary	
2003	Faster	Mark Neale	
2004	Mean Creek	Jacob Aaron Estes	
2004	Freshman Orientation	Ryan Shiraki	
2005	Love, Ludlow	Adrienne Weiss	
2006	Right at Your Door	Chris Gorak	
2006	The Hills Have Eyes	Alexandre Aja	
2006	The Covenant	Renny Harlin	
2007	P2	Franck Khalfoun	
2008	Sleep Dealer	Alex Rivera	
2008	The Strangers	Bryan Bertino	
2008	The Echo	Yam Laranas	
2009	The Good Guy	Julio DePietro	Composed with Kurt Oldman
2010	Resident Evil: Afterlife	Paul W. S. Anderson	
2010	And Soon the Darkness	Marcos Efron	
2011	I Melt with You	Mark Pellington	
2011	The Details	Jacob Aaron Estes	
2011	Fastest	Mark Neale	
2012	Citadel	Ciaran Foy	
2012	The Apparition	Todd Lincoln	
2012	Resident Evil: Retribution	Paul W. S. Anderson	
2013	Blaze You Out	Mateo Frazier; Diego Joaquin Lopez	
2013	Innocence	Hilary Brougher	
2014	Animal	Brett Simmons	
2014	Girl House	Trevor Matthews	
2014	7 Minutes	Jay Martin	
2015	H8RZ	Derrick Borte	
2015	Sinister 2	Ciarán Foy	
2016	Havenhurst	Andrew C. Erin	
2016	The Monster	Bryan Bertino	
2016	City of Joy	Madeleine Gavin	Composed with Lokua Kanza
2017	47 Meters Down	Johannes Roberts	
2017	Wish Upon	John R. Leonetti	
2019	The Wolf's Call	Antonin Baudry	
2019	The Silence	John R. Leonetti	
2019	47 Meters Down: Uncaged	Johannes Roberts	
2019	Haunt	Scott Beck; Bryan Woods	
2019	Lucky Day	Roger Avary	
