= Matt Hanson (author) =

British film director and producer (born 1971)

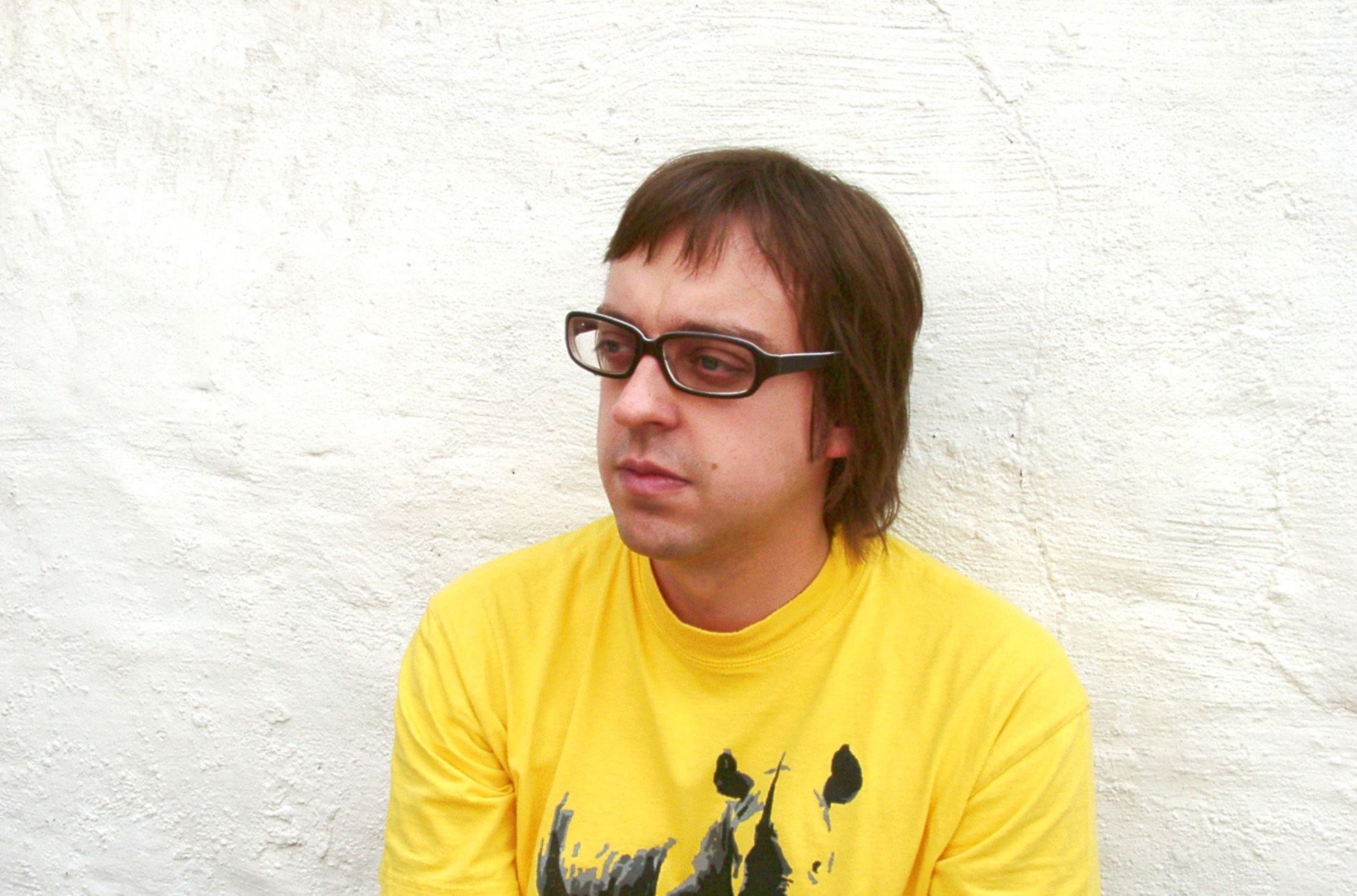
- Hanson in 2004
- Born: 17 September 1971 (age 54); Huddersfield, England
- Occupations: writer, filmmaker, producer
- Website: matthanson.net

Matt Hanson (born 17 September 1971) is an author, film producer, and film director, specializing in digital art. He has created a series of projects which investigate cinema's possible futures, including A Swarm of Angels, onedotzero, and book projects including The End of Celluloid. As creator of A Swarm of Angels he has become concerned with issues relating to Creative Commons, free culture, open-source culture, crowdsourcing, and file sharing.

== Background ==
Matt Hanson is a filmmaker who created the onedotzero digital film festival & organisation, and is the author of a series of books on digital film, including The End of Celluloid: Film Futures in the Digital Age.

He is credited as a producer on short films (including the award-winning Salaryman 6, with Jake Knight, and City of Hollow Mountains with The Light Surgeons), television series for Channel 4 (UK).

As an advocate of digital film and alternative moving image in the 1990s he championed and showcased UK premieres of work by then relative unknowns Spike Jonze, Chris Cunningham, Michel Gondry and Jonathan Glazer.

He is the originator of the Creative Commons-licensed film project A Swarm of Angels.

A Screen International article cited him as an 'international film visionary'. Forbes listed him among 'Ten People Who Could Change The World' in 2007.

He was chosen as a participant in the inaugural Creators Series 2007, a showcase of emerging creativity and ideas in New York and Los Angeles by Tomorrow Unlimited.

== Bibliography ==
Books published include:

- The End of Celluloid: Film Futures in the Digital Age, Rotovision, 2004
- Motion Blur: Graphic Moving Imagemakers, Laurence King, 2004
- Sci-Fi Moviescapes, Rotovision, 2005
- Reinventing Music Video, Rotovision, 2006

Contributed to:

- On Air: A Visual History of MTV, DGV, 2005
