= Docurama =

Documentary video streaming service

- Industry: Entertainment
- Founded: May 2014
- Headquarters: New York, United States
- Area served: North America
- Key people: Susan Margolin (president)
- Services: Video streaming
- Number of employees: 10
- Parent: Cineverse
- Website: docurama.com

Docurama is a video streaming service since May 2014 by US entertainment company Cineverse that serves documentary films.

In 2013, Docurama had a library of about 1,200 programs, including feature-length films, short films, television programs, interviews, and film festival coverage.
