= Big! =

- Genre: Reality Television
- Written by: Larry Law
- Directed by: Alan LaGarde
- Presented by: Frank Payne
- Country of origin: United States
- Original language: English
- No. of seasons: 1
- No. of episodes: 13

Production
- Running time: 60 minutes
- Production company: Original Productions

Original release
- Network: Discovery Channel
- Release: June 1 – December 2, 2004

Big! is a television program series in which an episode consists of a team of engineers manufacturing the world's biggest items (usually a household item that is normally hand carried, scaled up to proportions that make the items unusable without JCBs and cherrypickers) for the sake of setting world records.

The devices have to function to qualify.

The series originally aired on Discovery Channel in 2004. It is currently airing on The Science Channel weekday mornings.

== Cast ==
- Frank Payne
- Eric Scarlett
- Reverend Gadget
- Lisa Legohn
- Wink Eller
- Christoff Koon

== Episodes ==
- 101: Blender
- 102: Popcorn
- 103: Electric guitar
- 104: Motorcycle (01)
- 105: Motorcycle (02)
- 106: Giant claw (game)
- 107: BBQ
- 108: Clippers
- 109: Wood cuckoo clock – The team did not achieve an official Guinness World Records. Stuart Claxton, the Guinness World Records representative said that it didn't qualify because the team used styrofoam to create portions of the clock; a material which would not be found in a "genuine" cuckoo clock.
- 110: Toaster – The team did not achieve an official Guinness World Records. The team had to disable one side of the toaster to stop breaking the switch on the generator, the bread was only toasted near the center, and the toaster didn't properly "pop" the toast up.
- 111: Espresso machine
- 112: Treadmill – Stuart Claxton, of Guinness World Records, certified the team's creation as the world's largest treadmill.
- 113: Vacuum cleaner – Stuart Claxton of Guinness World Records certified the team's creation as the world's largest vacuum cleaner.

== Reception ==
The National Post television critic Jason Chow praised the show, calling it "dumb, comical, fun and spectacular all at the same time, which is why viewers will easily find themselves joining in". In a mixed review, Danny Heitman of The Advocate praised the show for employing "the comic premise of its colossal props to good advantage in telling a story" but criticized the show for using "some salty dialogue that makes Big! off-limits to younger viewers".
