= Onedotzero =

Digital arts organisation

onedotzero
- Founded: 1996; 30 years ago
- Founder: Matt Hanson
- Headquarters: London, England
- Website: http://www.onedotzero.com

onedotzero is a contemporary digital arts organisation based in London that aims to promote new work in moving image and motion arts. The organisation conducts public events, artist and content development, publishing projects, education, production, creative direction, and related visual art consultancy services.

It holds international events, including the onedotzero festival first held in 1997. onedotzero is supported by the Arts Council of England. It runs a free open submission scheme, and receives around 2,000 entries from all over the world each year. The group curates, commissions, produces, and presents new moving image works that also include music, architecture, design, film, interaction design, computer gaming and live audio visual explorations.

== History ==
onedotzero was created in 1996 by writer and former film critic Matt Hanson as a film festival designed to promote new media collectives and new digital art works developing in London. The festival promoted the new desktop digital filmmaking tools that were becoming available, which Hanson termed 'the film studio in your flat.' It allowed exploration of a film on a single screen, interactive and live audio-visual work. onedotzero was the first festival to present and commission audio visual performances, computer gaming visuals, music videos, and commercials in a film and arts context.

The first festival in 1997 was produced with a short-lived new media arts collective, onearmbandit. From this group, new media and theatre producer Shane Walter joined Hanson as joint festival director for the second festival (onedotzero2,1998) and subsequent festivals. Hanson and Walter established the onedotzero company later in 1997. After Hanson resigned as director at the end of 2001 Walter continued as sole director of onedotzero6 and subsequent festivals.

Other directors whose music video work was shown in early festivals include Chris Cunningham, Spike Jonze, Mike Mills and Michel Gondry.

In November 2008 the festival onedotzero_adventures in motion was held at the BFI Southbank and BFI IMAX for the first time. The festival tours internationally, including Buenos Aires, Argentina, New York, France, Russia, with sell-out festivals at London's BFI Southbank on November 8. and in Buenos Aires on September 8. The festival includes themed compilation screenings featuring short film, music videos, animation and motion graphic from several countries. It also features live audiovisual performance.

In 2008, onedotzero held two events in the BFI IMAX. They commissioned British musician Nitin Sawhney to collaborate with stage designer Es Devlin and onedotzero industries for a one-off show. They also hosted a night featuring audiovisual acts The Light Surgeons, D-Fuse AV and Hexstatic. The festival also featured installations by artists including Jason Bruges, Troika, Doodlearth and Hexstatic.

In 2006, to mark the tenth anniversary of onedotzero, the group held a series of events, including onedotzero_transvision at the Victoria and Albert museum, onedotzero_amour at the Tate Modern, and onedotzero_metamorphosis at the Hayward Gallery.

In Screen International’s 25th anniversary issue onedotzero directors Hanson and Walter were named as one of the top ten visionaries of the UK film industry alongside Ridley Scott, Chris Nolan and Lynne Ramsay. The Guardian Film Unlimited described its work as the most, crucial groundbreaking festival of the early 21st-century.

onedotzero held a festival in Buenos Aires, Argentina In September 2008, with over 50,000 people attending over the weekend, for screenings, installations and live events from Mole and Martin Philips, Christian Wloch, Peter, Bjorn and John and Hexstatic

In 2009 they again held their film festival at the BFI in London "adventures in Motion" and co-curated (with the V & A Museum) "decode: digital design sensations" with new work in digital and interactive design, from small screen based graphics to large-scale installations, and included 35 works by artists and designers including Daniel Brown, Golan Levin and Daniel Rozin as well as new designers including Troika and Mehmet Akten.

== Related projects ==
onedotzero was conceived as a producing festival and soon created spin-offs from its programming.

=== onedottv ===
In 1999 the festival span off the TV series onedottv - it was produced and programmed by Hanson and Walter. In 2001, a 12-part follow-up maxi-series "onedottv_global " was made for the UK television channel Channel 4, directed and produced by the co-directors, with camera by Grant Gee. It involved filming subjects in Tokyo, New York, San Francisco, Los Angeles, Sweden and Paris.

=== onedotzero DVD label ===
The onedotzero DVD label, launched in 2001, distributes and sells in several countries. The onedotzero_select DVD series are compilations with highlights of the festival screenings, as well as other new works including short films, documentary and music videos. The fifth edition in the series was released in summer 2007.

Subsequent releases include a DVD single - the multi-award winning black and white animated short Who I Am And What I Want by artist David Shrigley and director Chris Shepherd, of Slinky Pictures.

=== onedotzero publishing ===
In 2004, a book and accompanying DVD, Motion blur: graphic moving imagemakers, was co-edited by Hanson and Walter, with interviews mainly sourced from Hanson's interviews from the onedotzero_global TV series, and additional photography from Walter. It was published in the UK, Netherlands, and USA, going to reprint twice. The follow-up book, produced by Laurence King, was released in 2008.

=== onedotzero + MTV Bloom ===
Launched in autumn 2006, Bloom was an international competition for moving image artists, which commissioned a series of one-minute-films that explore identity and community. The films were finished in summer 2007, and shown on MTV and online.

=== onedotzero industries ===
onedotzero has a sister production company, onedotzero industries, which was founded by Shane Walter and Sam Pattinson. it works in the area of moving image and brand development for TV, web, live events, visuals, promos, installations, commercials and emergent technologies. Clients include Sony, BBC TV, LG, Nike, Sharp, Stella Artois, Levi Strauss, Absolut Vodka, Diesel, Dentsu, Motorola, S4C, Asian Dub Foundation, The Charlatans, Live8, and Giles Deacon.

Projects include the animation series Geek Boy for the Sci Fi UK channel, live visual content for the Rolling Stones, U2, Pet Shop Boys, Darren Hayes, Oasis, Chemical Brothers, Pink and Eros Ramazzotti tours, all video content for the Little Britain stage production and video and interactive content / production for the George Michael and Genesis live tours.

onedotzero industries works with designers including Willie Williams, Run Wrake, Logan, Julian Opie, UVA, D-Fuse, Minivegas, Shroom, and Alex Rutterford, as well as to commissioning new student designers.

== Videography/bibliography ==
=== Television ===
- onedottv (1999)

=== DVD ===
- onedotzero_select dvd1 (2003)
- onedotzero_select dvd2 (2004)
- onedotzero_select dvd3 (2004)
- onedotzero_select dvd4 (2005)
- onedotzero_select dvd5 (released Summer 2007)
- Who I Am And What I Want (2006) award-winning DVD single by David Shrigley and Chris Shepherd, Slinky Pictures
- D-Tonate by D-Fuse (2003)

=== Print ===
- Motion Blur: Graphic Moving Imagemakers ISBN 1856694658
- Motion Blur 2: Multidimensional Moving Imagemakers (published early 2008)
