= The End of Celluloid =

2004 book by Matt Hanson

The End of Celluloid: Film futures in the digital age
- Author: Matt Hanson
- Language: English
- Publisher: RotoVision
- Publication date: 2004

The End of Celluloid: Film futures in the digital age is a book, written by Matt Hanson and published by RotoVision in 2004, on digital cinematography, machinima, video games, music video, and other emerging film forms.
