= Charge, Zero Emissions/Maximum Speed =

Charge
- Directed by: Mark Neale
- Written by: Mark Neale
- Narrated by: Ewan McGregor
- Release date: 12 April 2013 (USA)
- Running time: 90 minutes
- Language: English

Charge, Zero Emissions/Maximum Speed is a documentary film by Mark Neale. The film features the introduction of electric bike racing to the Isle of Man races.

The movie was available for sale on Region 1 DVD in 2011.
