= Fundación Proa =

Private art centre in Buenos Aires, Argentina

Coordinates: 34.6397°S 58.3620°W

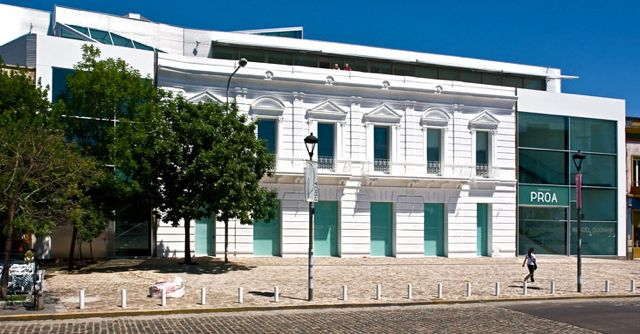
Fundacion Proa entrance.

The Fundación Proa is a private art center in La Boca, Buenos Aires, Argentina. It was founded in 1996 and develops educational programs and exchange with cultural institutions. Its focus is on the dissemination of the great artistic movements of the twentieth century.

The foundation is located at Pedro de Mendoza Avenue, 1929.

== New headquarters ==
Ten years after its opening, Fundación Proa faced a renovation process that concluded in 2008 with the opening of its new headquarters. It is an old building Italianate facade and three floors with four exhibition halls, a multimedia auditorium, a specialized library, a restaurant and terrace, plus spaces for action and opening to the public and a transparent facade to communicate experiences from inside to the neighborhood. The project design and direction of work was carried out by the Caruso-Torricella Milan studio, the same studio that in 1996 transformed the old building into an iconic landmark for contemporary art in Buenos Aires.

In the remodeling project, on both sides of the historic and restored front of the building that originally hosted the Fundación Proa in La Boca, two contemporary glass facades were incorporated, both technologically and visually.

== Acknowledgements ==
In 2002, the Konex Foundation awarded the museum for its contribution to the VIsual Arts of Argentina with a special mention in the Konex Awards. It was also awarded the Diploma of Merit in 2018 by the Konex Foundation.

== Principal exhibitions ==
- Louise Bourgeois (2011)
- Ron Mueck (2013)
- Kazimir Malevich (2016)
- Yves Klein (2017)
- Ai Weiwei (2017)
- Alexander Calder (2018)
- Anish Kapoor (2019)
