= Fastest (film) =

2011 American documentary film by Mark Neale

- Directed by: Mark Neale
- Written by: Mark Neale
- Produced by: Mark Neale; Paul Taublieb
- Starring: Valentino Rossi; Jorge Lorenzo; Ben Spies; Casey Stoner; Marco Simoncelli; Colin Edwards; Alvaro Bautista
- Narrated by: Ewan McGregor
- Music by: tomandandy
- Distributed by: Media X International, Inc.
- Release date: September 20, 2011 (Leicester Square)
- Country: United States
- Language: English

Fastest is a documentary film about Grand Prix motorcycle racing, MotoGP. Filmed between 2010 and 2011 by director Mark Neale, it is narrated by Ewan McGregor and produced by Neale and Paul Taublieb. "Fastest" followed the release of the documentary "The Doctor, The Tornado and The Kentucky Kid" and then was followed by "Hitting the Apex" which will be followed by "Charge," which is currently awaiting release.

== Overview ==
Fastest is a documentary of the 2010 Grand Prix motorcycle racing season.

== Notable appearances ==
- Colin Edwards
- Jorge Lorenzo
- Valentino Rossi
- Marco Simoncelli
- Ben Spies
- Casey Stoner

The film includes appearances by the aforementioned 9-times World champion, Valentino Rossi (Fiat Yamaha), two-time champion, Casey Stoner (Ducati Corse), 2010 Champion Jorge Lorenzo (Fiat Yamaha), American former World Superbike Champions, Ben Spies (Yamaha Tech 3), and double-winner Colin Edwards (Yamaha Tech3). The film also features Marco Simoncelli, 2008 250cc GP World Champion, (Gresini Honda), during what was his rookie season in the MotoGP category.

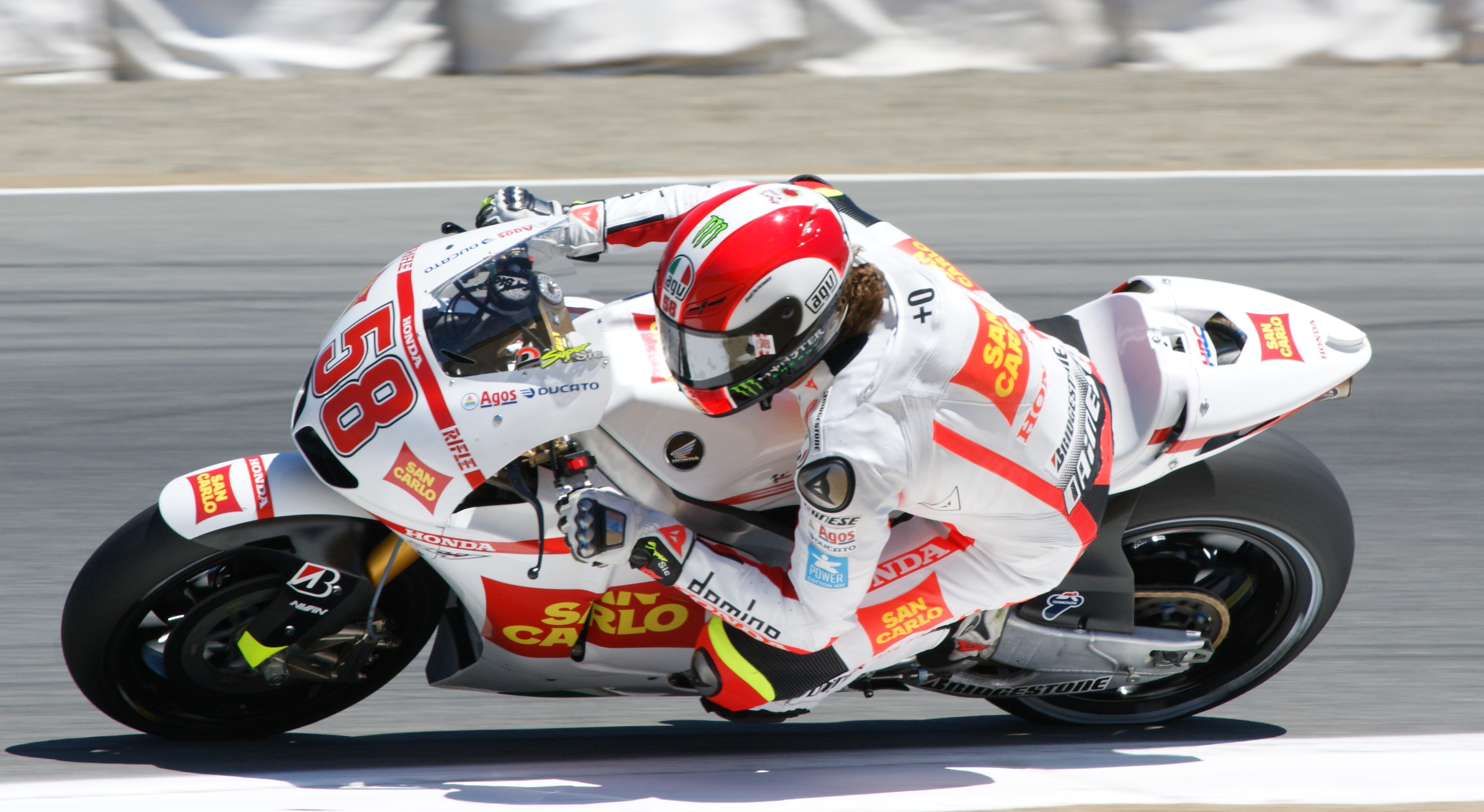
Simoncelli at the 2010 United States Grand Prix at Laguna Seca

== Release ==
The film premiered at Leicester Square on 20 September 2011 and was attended by British riders Cal Crutchlow, Bradley Smith, Scott Redding, Danny Kent, Eugene Laverty. The event was hosted by Eurosport commentator Toby Moody, with a late appearance by fellow commentator Julian Ryder, and the BBC's Matt Roberts. The film was introduced with a short clip especially for the London Premier by Valentino Rossi.

The film is available on DVD in the US, UK and Canada.
