= Grand Prix motorcycle racing =

Premier championship of motorcycle road racing

MotoGP World Championship
- Category: Motorcycle racing
- Region: International
- Inaugural season: 2002 (originally in 1949 as 500cc)
- Constructors: Aprilia, Ducati, Honda, KTM, Yamaha
- Tyre suppliers: Michelin
- Riders' champion: Marc Márquez (2026)
- Constructors' champion: Ducati (2025)
- Teams' champion: Aprilia Racing (2026)
- Official website: motogp.com

Moto2 World Championship
- Category: Motorcycle racing
- Region: International
- Inaugural season: 2010 (originally in 1949 as 250cc)
- Constructors: Boscoscuro, Forward, Kalex
- Tyre suppliers: Pirelli
- Riders' champion: Diogo Moreira (2025)
- Constructors' champion: Kalex (2026)
- Teams' champion: Fantic Racing (2025)
- Official website: motogp.com

Moto3 World Championship
- Category: Motorcycle racing
- Region: International
- Inaugural season: 2012 (originally in 1949 as 125cc)
- Constructors: Honda, KTM
- Tyre suppliers: Pirelli
- Riders' champion: Máximo Quiles (2026)
- Constructors' champion: KTM (2026)
- Teams' champion: CFMoto Aspar Team (2026)
- Official website: motogp.com

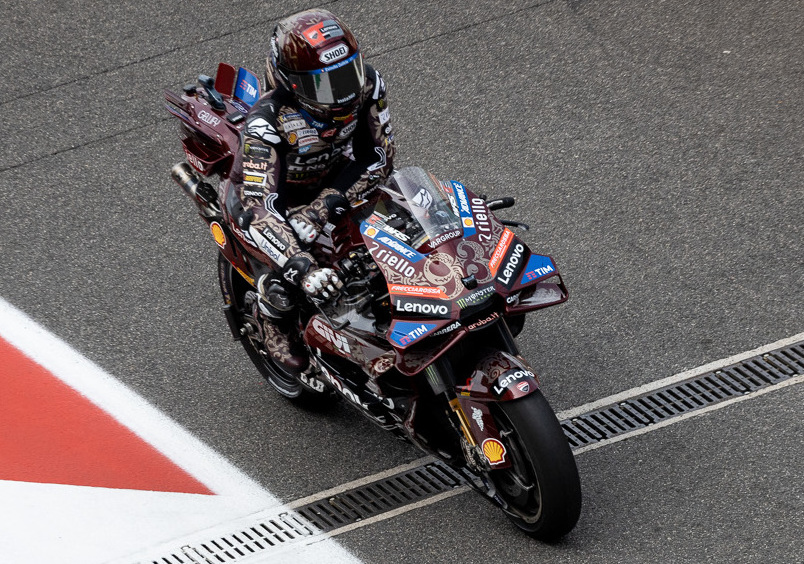
Ducati Desmosedici MotoGP bike (2025)

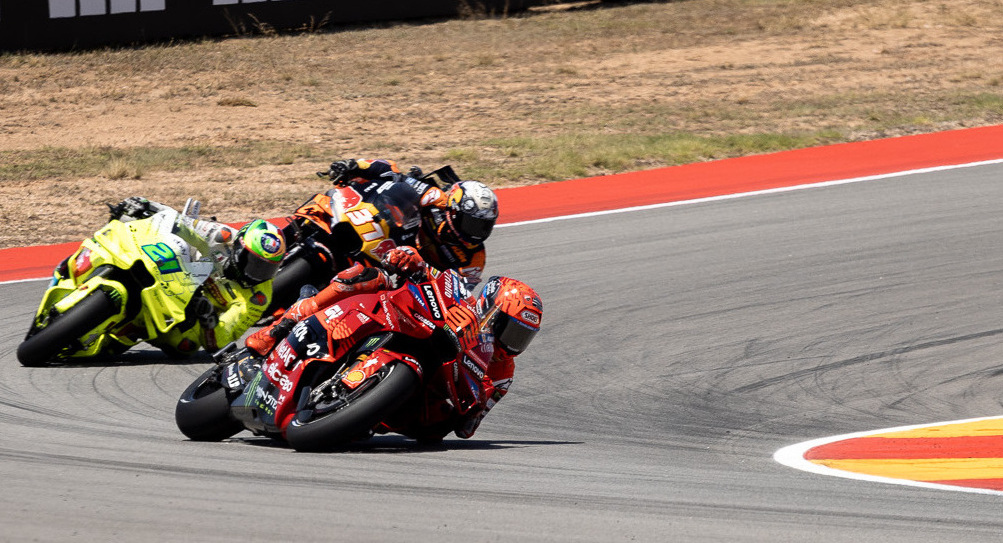
Marc Márquez leading the Aragon GP 2025

Grand Prix motorcycle racing is the highest class of motorcycle road racing. Events are held on road circuits sanctioned by the Fédération Internationale de Motocyclisme (FIM). Independent motorcycle racing events have been held since the start of the twentieth century, when large national events were often given the title Grand Prix. In 1949, the FIM was founded as the international governing body for motorcycle sport, and it coordinated rules so that select events could become part of official world championships. Grand Prix road racing is the oldest established motorsport world championship.

Grand Prix motorcycles are purpose-built racing machines that are unavailable for purchase by the general public and unable to be ridden legally on public roads. This contrasts with the various production-based categories of racing, such as the Superbike World Championship and the Isle of Man TT races, that feature modified versions of road-going motorcycles available to the public.

The top division in Grand Prix racing was originally known as 500cc. Since 2002, the start of the four-stroke era, it has been known as MotoGP. The modern championship is divided into three official classes: MotoGP, Moto2, and Moto3. While 500cc/MotoGP is recognised as the premier class world championship, all classes hold official status. All three classes now use four-stroke engines.

The most successful rider across all Grand Prix classes is Giacomo Agostini, with 15 titles and 122 race wins. Ángel Nieto is second with 13 titles and 90 wins, followed by Marc Márquez in third with 10 titles and 106 wins. As of 2026, Valentino Rossi holds the record for most premier class race wins, with 89.

Since 2025 the championship is organised by Liberty Media via its subsidiary MotoGP Sports Entertainment Group.

== History ==
An FIM Road Racing World Championship Grand Prix was first organized by the Fédération Internationale de Motocyclisme (FIM) in 1949. The commercial rights are now owned by MotoGP Sports Entertainment Group, with the FIM remaining as the sport sanctioning body. Teams are represented by the International Road Racing Teams Association (IRTA) and manufacturers by the Motorcycle Sport Manufacturers Association (MSMA). Rules and changes to regulations are decided between the four entities, with Dorna casting a tie-breaking vote. In cases of technical modifications, the MSMA can unilaterally enact or veto changes by unanimous vote among its members. These four entities compose the Grand Prix Commission.

There have traditionally been several races at each event for various classes of motorcycles, based on engine size, and one class for sidecars. Classes for 50cc, 80cc, 125cc, 250cc, 350cc, 500cc, and 750cc solo machines have existed at some time, and 350cc and 500cc sidecars. Up through the 1950s and most of the 1960s, four-stroke engines dominated all classes. In the 1960s, due to advances in engine design and technology, two-stroke engines began to take root in the smaller classes.

In 1969, the FIM—citing high development costs for non-works teams due to rules which allowed a multiplicity of cylinders (meaning smaller pistons, producing higher revs) and a multiplicity of gears (giving narrower power bands, affording higher states of tune)—brought in new rules restricting all classes to six gears and most to two cylinders (four cylinders in the case of the 350cc and 500cc classes). This led to a mass walk-out of the sport by the previously highly successful Honda, Suzuki, and Yamaha manufacturer teams, skewing the results tables for the next several years, with MV Agusta effectively the only works team left in the sport until Yamaha (1973) and Suzuki (1974) returned with new two-stroke designs. By this time, two-strokes completely eclipsed the four-strokes in all classes. In 1979, Honda, on its return to GP racing, made an attempt to return the four-stroke to the top class with the NR500, but this project failed, and, in 1983, even Honda was winning with a two-stroke 500.

Previously, the championship featured a 50cc class from 1962 to 1983, later changed to an 80cc class from 1984 to 1989. The class was dropped for the 1990 season, after being dominated primarily by Spanish and Italian makers. It also featured a 350cc class from 1949 to 1982, and a 750cc class from 1977 to 1979. Sidecars were dropped from World Championship events after 1996 (see Sidecar World Championship).

From the mid-1970s through to 2001, the top class of GP racing allowed 500cc displacement with a maximum of four cylinders, regardless of whether the engine was a two-stroke or four-stroke. This is unlike TT Formula or motocross, where two and four strokes had different engine size limits in the same class to provide similar performance. Consequently, all machines were two-strokes, since they produce power with every rotation of the crank, whereas four-stroke engines produce power only every second rotation. Some two- and three-cylinder two-stroke 500s were seen, but though they had a minimum-weight advantage under the rules, typically attained higher corner speed and could qualify well, they lacked the power of the four-cylinder machines.

In 2002, rule changes were introduced to facilitate the phasing out of the 500cc two-strokes. The premier class was rebranded MotoGP, as manufacturers were to choose between running two-stroke engines up to 500cc or four-strokes up to 990cc or less. Manufacturers were also permitted to employ their choice of engine configuration. Despite the increased costs of the new four-stroke engines, they were soon able to dominate their two-stroke rivals. As a result, by 2003 no two-stroke machines remained in the MotoGP field. The 125cc and 250cc classes still consisted exclusively of two-stroke machines.

In 2007, the MotoGP class had its maximum engine displacement capacity reduced to 800cc for a minimum of five years. In 2009, during the Great Recession, in an effort to cut costs, MotoGP underwent changes including reducing Friday practice sessions and testing sessions, extending the lifespan of engines, switching to a single tyre manufacturer, and banning qualifying tyres, active suspension, launch control and ceramic composite brakes. For the 2010 season, carbon brake discs were banned.

For the 2012 season, the MotoGP engine capacity was increased again to 1,000cc. It also saw the introduction of Claiming Rule Teams (CRT), which were given more engines per season and larger fuel tanks than factory teams, but were subject to a factory team buying ("claiming") their rival's powertrain for a fixed price. The sport's governing body received applications from sixteen new teams looking to join the MotoGP class. For the 2014 season, the CRT subclass was rebranded Open, as the claiming rule was removed. Also, all entries adopted a standard engine control unit, with factory teams being allowed to run any software, and Open entries using a standard software. For the 2016 season, the Open subclass was dropped, and factory entries switched to a standard engine control unit software.

In 2010, the 250cc two-stroke class was replaced by the new Moto2 600cc four-stroke class. In 2012, the 125cc two-stroke class was replaced by the Moto3 250cc four-stroke class with a weight limit of 65 kg with fuel. For the 2019 season Moto2 introduced the 3-cylinder, 765cc Triumph production engine, while Moto3 and MotoGP still use prototype engines.

MotoE class was introduced in 2019 as a "World Cup" until 2022 and gained World Championship status only from 2023 until 2025, because MotoE class went on hiatus after the 2025 season.

== Chronology ==
=== Pre-MotoGP era ===
- 1949: Start of the world championship in Grand Prix motorcycle racing for five separate categories, 125cc, 250cc, 350cc, 500cc, and sidecars. Harold Daniell wins the first ever 500cc Grand Prix race, held at the Isle of Man TT.
- 1951: Sidecars are reduced in engine capacity from 600cc to 500cc.
- 1952: Ken Kavanagh wins the 1952 350cc Ulster Grand Prix to become the first Australian competitor to win a world championship Grand Prix race. Ray Amm wins the 1952 350cc Nations Grand Prix to become the first African competitor to win a world championship Grand Prix race.
- 1957: Gilera, Mondial, and Moto Guzzi withdraw at the end of the season, citing increasing costs. Bob McIntyre wins the longest ever Grand Prix race of 301.84 miles (485.76 km), held over 8 laps of the Isle of Man.
- 1958: MV Agusta win the constructors' and riders' championships in all four solo classes, and repeat this feat in 1959 and 1960.
- 1959: Honda enters the Isle of Man TT for the first time.
- 1961: The 1961 Argentine Grand Prix is the first world championship race held outside Europe. Kunimitsu Takahashi wins the 1961 250cc German Grand Prix to become the first Asian competitor to win a world championship Grand Prix race.
- 1963: The 1963 Japanese Grand Prix is the first world championship race held in Asia.
- 1964: The 1964 United States Grand Prix is the first world championship race held in North America.
- 1966: Honda wins the constructors' championship in all five solo classes. Jim Redman wins Honda's first ever 500cc Grand Prix at Hockenheim, also the first win for a Japanese factory in the premier class.
- 1967: Final year of unrestricted numbers of cylinders and gears. Honda withdraws in protest.
- 1968: Giacomo Agostini (MV Agusta) wins both the 350cc and 500cc titles.
- 1969: Godfrey Nash, riding a Norton Manx, becomes the last rider to win a 500cc Grand Prix riding a single-cylinder machine.
- 1971: Jack Findlay rides a Suzuki TR500 to the first ever win in the 500cc class for a two-stroke machine.
- 1972: The death of Gilberto Parlotti at the Isle of Man TT causes multiple world champion Giacomo Agostini and other riders to boycott the next four events on grounds of safety.
- 1972: Last year of 500cc sidecars.
- 1972: Giacomo Agostini wins his seventh consecutive 500cc championship with MV Agusta.
- 1973: The deaths of Jarno Saarinen and Renzo Pasolini at the Italian round at Monza cause the 250cc race to be cancelled.
- 1974: The Suzuki RG 500 is the first square-four in the 500cc class. The constructors' title is won by a Japanese brand and a two-stroke for the first time (Yamaha).
- 1975: Giacomo Agostini (Yamaha) wins the 500cc class, making Yamaha the first non-European brand to the riders' championship in the premier class with two stroke engine.
- 1976: Barry Sheene wins the first 500cc championship for Suzuki. After the 1976 Isle of Man TT, the FIM gives in to the riders' boycott and removes the event from the Grand Prix calendar.
- 1977: Formula 750 becomes a world championship for 750cc machines. Barry Sheene wins the 500cc class. The British Grand Prix moves from the Isle of Man to the Silverstone Circuit on the British mainland.
- 1978: Kenny Roberts (Yamaha) wins the 500cc class, the first American to do so.
- 1979: Kenny Roberts leads a rider revolt by threatening to form a race series to compete against the FIM world championship, breaking the FIM hegemony and increased the political clout of Grand Prix racers, which subsequently led to improved safety standards and a new era of professionalism in the sport.
- 1979: Last year of the Formula 750 class.
- 1982: Antonio Cobas develops a stronger and lighter aluminium twin-beam chassis to replace the steel backbone frame used since the 1950s, and by the 1990s, all the major racing teams in Grand Prix competition used the aluminium frame design.
- 1982: Last year of the 350cc class.
- 1983: The 1983 South African Grand Prix is the first world championship race held in Africa.
- 1983: Freddie Spencer (Honda) wins the 500cc class. Spencer and Kenny Roberts win all 500cc races of the season between them.
- 1984: Michelin introduces radial tyres in GPs.
- 1984: 50cc class replaced by 80cc.
- 1985: Freddie Spencer (Honda) wins both the 250cc and 500cc titles.
- 1987: Push starts are eliminated.
- 1987: Wayne Gardner (Honda) wins the 500cc class, the first Australian to do so.
- 1988: Wayne Rainey wins the first 500cc race using carbon brakes, at the British GP.
- 1989: The 1989 Australian Grand Prix is the first world championship race held in Australian continent.
- 1989: Last year of the 80cc class.
- 1990: The 500cc class grid switches from five to four bikes per row.
- 1992: Honda introduces the NSR500 with a big bang engine. Dorna Sports becomes the commercial rights owner.
- 1993: Shinichi Ito and his fuel-injected NSR500 break the 200 mph (320 km/h) barrier during the German GP on Hockenheimring.
- 1997: GP500 becomes the commercial name of Grand Prix motorcycle racing.
- 1998: The 500cc class switches to unleaded fuel.
- 1998: Mick Doohan wins his fifth consecutive 500cc title with Honda.
- 1999: Àlex Crivillé (Honda) wins the 500cc class, the first Spaniard to do so.
- 2000: MotoGP becomes the commercial name of Grand Prix motorcycle racing. Kenny Roberts Jr. (Suzuki) wins the 500cc class, he joins his father Kenny Roberts to claim the championship and thus making them the only father and son to have won the 500cc championship.
- 2001: Valentino Rossi wins his first premier class title and becomes the final two-stroke champion in the premier class.

=== MotoGP era ===
==== 2000s ====
- 2002: MotoGP replaces the 500cc class; four-strokes are re-introduced and receive a displacement increase to 990cc. Two-strokes of 500cc capacity remain legal for independent teams during the transitional period. Bridgestone makes its MotoGP debut, and Dunlop returns to the premier class after four years' absence.
- 2003: Ducati makes its Grand Prix debut in the new four-stroke MotoGP class.
- 2003: Daijiro Kato is killed during his home Japanese Grand Prix in the MotoGP class on the Suzuka Circuit when he hits the barrier at 130R just before the final chicane.
- 2003: A two-stroke bike is started in MotoGP for the last time at the Czech Grand Prix.
- 2004: The MotoGP grid switches from four to three bikes per row, while the 250cc and 125cc classes remain four bikes per row.
- 2004: Makoto Tamada earns Bridgestone their first MotoGP victory at the Brazilian GP.
- 2005: MotoGP adopts the flag-to-flag rule, allowing riders to pit and switch to bikes fitted with wet-weather tyres and continue if rain begins to fall mid-race.
- 2005: Valentino Rossi wins his fifth consecutive MotoGP title.
- 2007: MotoGP engine capacity is restricted to 800cc four-stroke.
- 2007: Ducati wins the riders' championship with Casey Stoner and also the constructors' title, becoming the first European brand to do so in the premier class in 33 years. Stoner wins 10 of 18 races during the season.
- 2008: MotoGP runs its first night race in Qatar.
- 2008: Dunlop drops out of MotoGP.
- 2009: Michelin drops out of MotoGP and Bridgestone becomes the sole tyre provider.
- 2009: Kawasaki runs a single bike as Hayate Racing Team, after the factory team announces their withdrawal from the series.
- 2009: Valentino Rossi wins his seventh and last MotoGP title at the age of 30.

==== 2010s ====
- 2010: Moto2 replaces the 250cc class. All engines are built for Moto2 by Honda and are four-stroke 600cc (36.6 cu in) in-line four-cylinder based on the CBR600RR road bike, producing around 140 bhp as of 2015 (125 whp).
- 2010: Moto2 rider Shoya Tomizawa is killed at Misano.
- 2010: For the first time, Spain hosts four Grands Prix in a year.
- 2010: The "rookie rule" is introduced, preventing any newcomer to the MotoGP championship from riding for a factory team, unless said manufacturer lack a satellite team.
- 2010: Kawasaki announces its retirement due to negotiations with Dorna, stating that it will continue racing activities using mass-produced motorcycles as well as supporting general race-oriented consumers.
- 2011: Every class grid swithces to three bikes per row.
- 2011: MotoGP rider Marco Simoncelli is killed at Sepang.
- 2011: Suzuki suspend their MotoGP participation at the end of the season.
- 2012: The new Moto3 250cc (15.2 cu in) four-stroke single-cylinder class replaces the 125cc two-stroke class.
- 2012: MotoGP raises the maximum engine capacity to 1,000cc (61 cu in) and introduces Claiming Rule Teams.
- 2012: Aprilia rejoins the MotoGP class as a claiming rule team (CRT).
- 2012: After ending a five-year Honda title drought the previous season, two-time world champion Casey Stoner retires from the sport at the age of 27. The "rookie rule" is rescinded for the 2013 season, and Marc Márquez is announced as Stoner's replacement on the factory Honda.
- 2013: Knockout qualifying format is introduced.
- 2013: Marc Márquez becomes the first rookie to win the championship in the MotoGP era, and the youngest ever premier class world champion.
- 2014: Removal of the claiming rule teams and introduction of the Open Class category. Marc Márquez dominates, winning the first 10 races of the season.
- 2015: Suzuki returns to MotoGP as a constructor after a four-year hiatus.
- 2015: Aprilia returns with a full factory team, run by Gresini Racing.
- 2015: Yamaha's Jorge Lorenzo wins his third and final MotoGP title by five points, defeating his teammate Valentino Rossi. This followed Rossi receiving a heavy grid penalty for the final round, as he was judged to have taken Marc Márquez out at the penultimate round.
- 2016: Michelin returns as tyre supplier after Bridgestone's withdrawal.
- 2016: Luis Salom is killed during Moto2 practice at the Catalan Grand Prix after a high-speed impact with his own stricken bike.
- 2016: TotalEnergies is renewed as the fuel supplier for the Moto2 and Moto3 classes.
- 2017: KTM joins the premier class with a factory-supported team for the first time.
- 2018: For the first time in MotoGP, certain satellite teams like Pramac Ducati and LCR Honda gain access to up-to-date factory bikes.
- 2019: Triumph Motorcycles replace Honda as sole Moto2 engine supplier. The new engines are 765cc (46.7 cu in) triples based on the Street Triple RS 765.
- 2019: Both Moto2 and Moto3 adopt the qualifying format used by MotoGP.
- 2019: The MotoE class is introduced using electric motorcycles (introduced as a "World Cup").
- 2019: A new penalty named the "Long Lap" penalty is introduced for riders exceeding track limits during races, and for moderate reckless riding.
- 2019: Marc Márquez wins his sixth MotoGP title at the age of 26, becoming the youngest rider and the first non-Italian rider to do so.
- 2019: Seven-time MotoGP champion Valentino Rossi becomes the first rider to contest his 400th Grand Prix at the age of 40.

==== 2020s ====
- 2020: The first half of the season is postponed or cancelled as a result of the COVID-19 pandemic.
- 2020: Petronas becomes the sole fuel supplier for the Moto2 and Moto3 classes.
- 2020: Brad Binder and Miguel Oliveira become the first riders to win a premier class Grand Prix for their respective nations; South Africa and Portugal. They also achieve the first wins for KTM and Tech3 in the MotoGP class.
- 2020: Joan Mir becomes MotoGP World Champion, Suzuki's first since 2000.
- 2021: Moto3 rider Jason Dupasquier is killed after an accident during the second qualifying session at the Italian Grand Prix on the Mugello Circuit.
- 2021: Valentino Rossi confirms his retirement before the Austrian round. He is the last rider to have competed in the 500cc class to participate in a MotoGP race.
- 2021: Fabio Quartararo becomes MotoGP World Champion, becoming the first French rider to win a premier class championship.
- 2022: Suzuki suspends their MotoGP participation at the end of the season.
- 2022: Francesco Bagnaia becomes MotoGP World Champion. He is the first Italian rider to win a premier class championship since Valentino Rossi in 2009, and the first Ducati rider to do so since Casey Stoner in 2007.
- 2023: Sprint races are introduced at all Grands Prix in the MotoGP class.
- 2023: The MotoE class gains World Championship status.
- 2024: Pirelli becomes the official tyre supplier for Moto2 and Moto3 classes.
- 2024: David Alonso becomes Moto3 World Champion. He is the first Colombian rider to win a World Championship in Grand Prix motorcycle racing history.
- 2024: Jorge Martín becomes MotoGP World Champion. He is the first independent team rider to win the World Championship in the MotoGP class.
- 2025: Harley-Davidson and MotoGP announce new global racing series launching in 2026.
- 2025: Dorna Sports (which includes MotoGP) is bought by Liberty Media, owner of Formula One. Dorna Sports becomes part of the Formula One Group.
- 2025: Marc Márquez becomes MotoGP World Champion for the seventh time. His 2184 days' drought between titles is the longest in history.
- 2025: Marc and Álex Márquez become the first brothers to finish 1st and 2nd in a championship in Grand Prix motorcycle racing history.
- 2025: Diogo Moreira becomes Moto2 World Champion. He is the first Brazilian rider to win a World Championship in Grand Prix motorcycle racing history.
- 2025: A hiatus is announced for the MotoE class after the 2025 season.
- 2026: The Bagger World Cup, a support championship for Harley-Davidson touring motorcycles, makes its debut.
- 2026: Three-time WorldSBK world champion Toprak Razgatlıoğlu joins Pramac Racing, becoming the first Turkish MotoGP rider.
- 2026: At the Italian GP, Jorge Martín reaches 368.6 km/h on his Aprilia RS-GP, the new top speed record in the premier class.
- 2026: Marc Márquez becomes MotoGP World Champion for the eighth time after overcoming a 102-point deficit. He tied Giacomo Agostini's record of eight 500cc/MotoGP World Championships.
- 2027: New motorbike regulations: engine displacement drops down to 850cc, maximum number of engines permitted per rider is reduced from 7 to 6, fuel tank capacity during the race is reduced to 20 litres, ride-height and holeshot devices are banned, and the aerodynamics of the motorcycles are reduced. All manufacturers will start the season in concession range B, and will be evaluated in the summer.
- 2027: Michelin drops out of MotoGP and Pirelli becomes the sole tyre provider.
- 2027: Starting in the 2027 season, MotoGP will introduce a new weekend format featuring a dedicated qualifying session for the Sprint, resulting in separate starting positions for the Sprint and the Grand Prix. The format will include Sprint Qualifying on Friday, FP3 and Grand Prix qualifying on Saturday, followed by the Moto3 and Moto2 races ahead of the MotoGP Grand Prix on Sunday.

== Event format ==
The starting grid consists of three columns and features around 20 riders. Grid positions are determined based on qualifying speeds, arranged in descending order, with the fastest rider occupying the pole. Each race is a 45-minute sprint, completed without any fuel or tyre stops.

In 2005, a flag-to-flag rule for MotoGP was introduced. Previously, if a race started dry and rain fell, officials could red-flag (stop) the race and either restart or resume on "wet" tyres. Now, when rain falls, a white flag is shown, indicating that riders can pit to swap the motorcycle on which they started the race for an identical one, as long as the tyres are different (that is, intermediates or wets instead of slicks). Besides different tyres, the wet-weather bikes have steel brake rotors and different brake pads instead of the carbon discs and pads used on the "dry" bikes. This is because the carbon brakes need to be very hot to function properly, and the water cools them too much. The suspension is also "softened" up somewhat for the wet weather.

When a rider crashes, track marshals up the track from the incident wave yellow flags, prohibiting overtaking in that area; one corner farther up the track, a stationary yellow flag is shown. If a fallen rider cannot be evacuated safely from the track, the race is red-flagged. Motorcycle crashes are usually one of two types: lowside, when the bike loses either front or rear tyre grip and slides out on the "low" side, and the more dangerous highside, when the tyres do not completely slide out, but instead grip the track surface, flipping the bike over to the "high side", usually catapulting the rider over the top. Increased use of traction control has made highsides much less frequent.

2023 saw the introduction of "sprint" race events; these races take place on the Saturday of the race weekend, with the traditional Grand Prix taking place on the Sunday. The sprint races are shorter – approximately half the length of a Grand Prix. Riders score approximately half the points of a full race in the sprints.

Current points system – Grand Prix races
Position	1	2	3	4	5	6	7	8	9	10	11	12	13	14	15
Points	25	20	16	13	11	10	9	8	7	6	5	4	3	2	1

Current points system – Sprint races
Position	1	2	3	4	5	6	7	8	9
Points	12	9	7	6	5	4	3	2	1

== Current riders ==
Twenty-two riders entered the full 2026 MotoGP World Championship.

Constructor	Rider		Team
Constructor	No.	Name	Team
Aprilia	72	(Italy) Marco Bezzecchi	(Italy) Aprilia Racing
Aprilia	89	(Spain) Jorge Martín	(Italy) Aprilia Racing
Aprilia	25	(Spain) Raúl Fernández	(United States) SuperFile Trackhouse MotoGP Team
Aprilia	79	(Japan) Ai Ogura	(United States) SuperFile Trackhouse MotoGP Team
Ducati	63	(Italy) Francesco Bagnaia	(Italy) Ducati Lenovo Team
Ducati	93	(Spain) Marc Márquez	(Italy) Ducati Lenovo Team
Ducati	54	(Spain) Fermín Aldeguer	(Italy) BK8 Gresini Racing MotoGP
Ducati	73	(Spain) Álex Márquez	(Italy) BK8 Gresini Racing MotoGP
Ducati	21	(Italy) Franco Morbidelli	(Italy) Pertamina Enduro VR46 Racing Team
Ducati	49	(Italy) Fabio Di Giannantonio	(Italy) Pertamina Enduro VR46 Racing Team
Honda	10	(Italy) Luca Marini	(Japan) Honda HRC Castrol
Honda	36	(Spain) Joan Mir	(Japan) Honda HRC Castrol
Honda	5	(France) Johann Zarco	(Monaco) LCR Honda
Honda	11	(Brazil) Diogo Moreira	(Monaco) LCR Honda
KTM	33	(South Africa) Brad Binder	(Austria) Red Bull KTM Factory Racing
KTM	37	(Spain) Pedro Acosta	(Austria) Red Bull KTM Factory Racing
KTM	12	(Spain) Maverick Viñales	(France) Red Bull KTM Tech3
KTM	23	(Italy) Enea Bastianini	(France) Red Bull KTM Tech3
Yamaha	20	(France) Fabio Quartararo	(Japan) Monster Energy Yamaha MotoGP Team
Yamaha	42	(Spain) Álex Rins	(Japan) Monster Energy Yamaha MotoGP Team
Yamaha	7	(Turkey) Toprak Razgatlıoğlu	(Italy) Prima Pramac Yamaha MotoGP
Yamaha	43	(Australia) Jack Miller	(Italy) Prima Pramac Yamaha MotoGP

== Champions ==
The Riders' World Championship is awarded to the most successful rider over a season, as determined by a points system based on Grand Prix results.

Giacomo Agostini is the most successful champion in Grand Prix history, with 15 titles to his name (eight in the 500cc/MotoGP class and seven in the 350cc class). Marc Márquez is the most successful contemporary rider: he has won 10 championships, eight in the 500cc/MotoGP class and one each in the 250cc/Moto2 and 125cc/Moto3 classes. The current premier class champion is Marc Márquez.

== Circuits ==
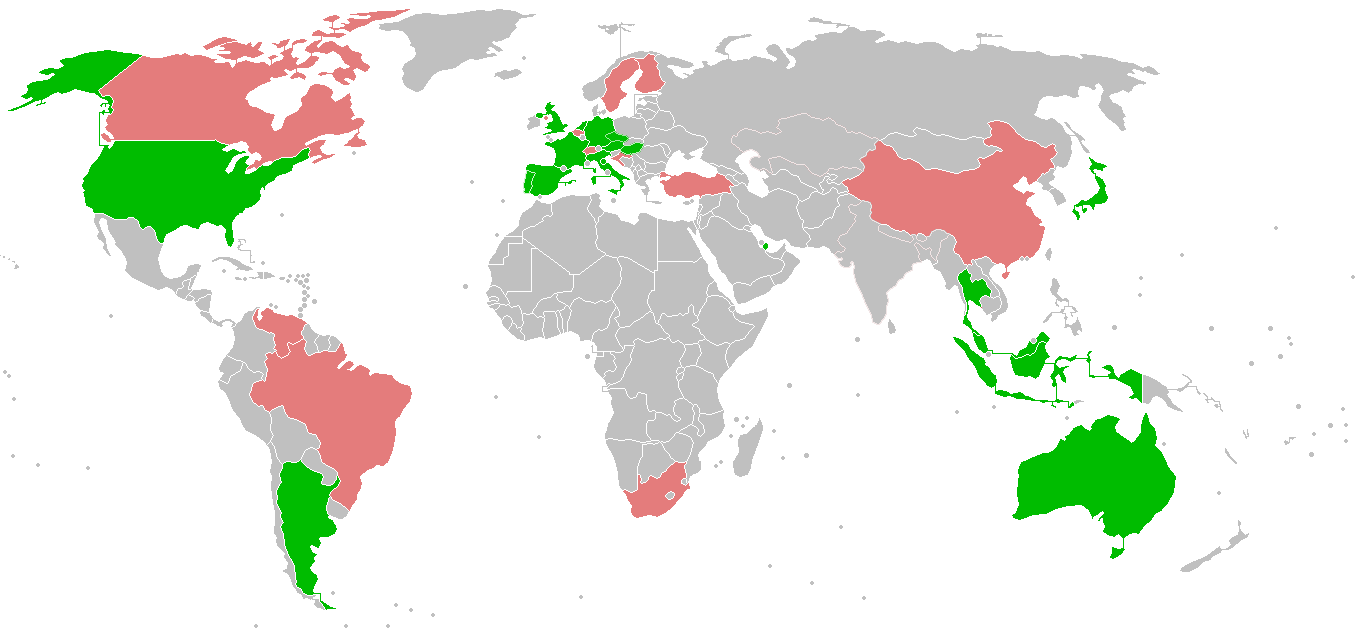
Countries marked in green are due to host Grands Prix in this season – those in red have hosted GP races in the past

The 2026 MotoGP World Championship consists of 22 circuits.

- Thailand, Buriram, Buriram International Circuit
- Brazil, Goiânia, Autódromo Internacional Ayrton Senna
- United States, Austin, Circuit of the Americas
- Spain, Jerez de la Frontera, Circuito de Jerez
- France, Le Mans, Bugatti Circuit
- Spain, Montmeló, Circuit de Barcelona-Catalunya
- Italy, Scarperia e San Piero, Mugello Circuit
- Hungary, Balatonfőkajár, Balaton Park Circuit
- Czech Republic, Brno, Brno Circuit
- Netherlands, Assen, TT Circuit Assen
- Germany, Hohenstein-Ernstthal, Sachsenring
- United Kingdom, Silverstone, Silverstone Circuit
- Spain, Alcañiz, MotorLand Aragón
- Italy, Misano Adriatico, Misano World Circuit
- Austria, Spielberg, Red Bull Ring
- Japan, Motegi, Motegi Circuit
- Indonesia, Mandalika, Mandalika International Street Circuit
- Australia, Phillip Island, Phillip Island Grand Prix Circuit (Note: An Australian Grand Prix was supposed to be held at this circuit in 2026, but was cancelled due to inclement weather and poor visibility.)
- Malaysia, Sepang, Sepang International Circuit
- Qatar, Lusail, Lusail International Circuit
- Portugal, Portimão, Algarve International Circuit
- Spain, Valencia, Circuit Ricardo Tormo

== Technical regulations ==
The key technical regulations for each class are as follows. In the 2005 season, Rule 2.10.5 was introduced: 'No fuel on the motorcycle may be more than 15 °C below ambient temperature. The use of any device on the motorcycle to artificially decrease the temperature of the fuel below ambient temperature is forbidden. No motorcycle may include such a device.' This stops an artificial "boost" gained from increasing fuel density by cooling it.

=== MotoGP class ===
Shortened 2025 MotoGP logo

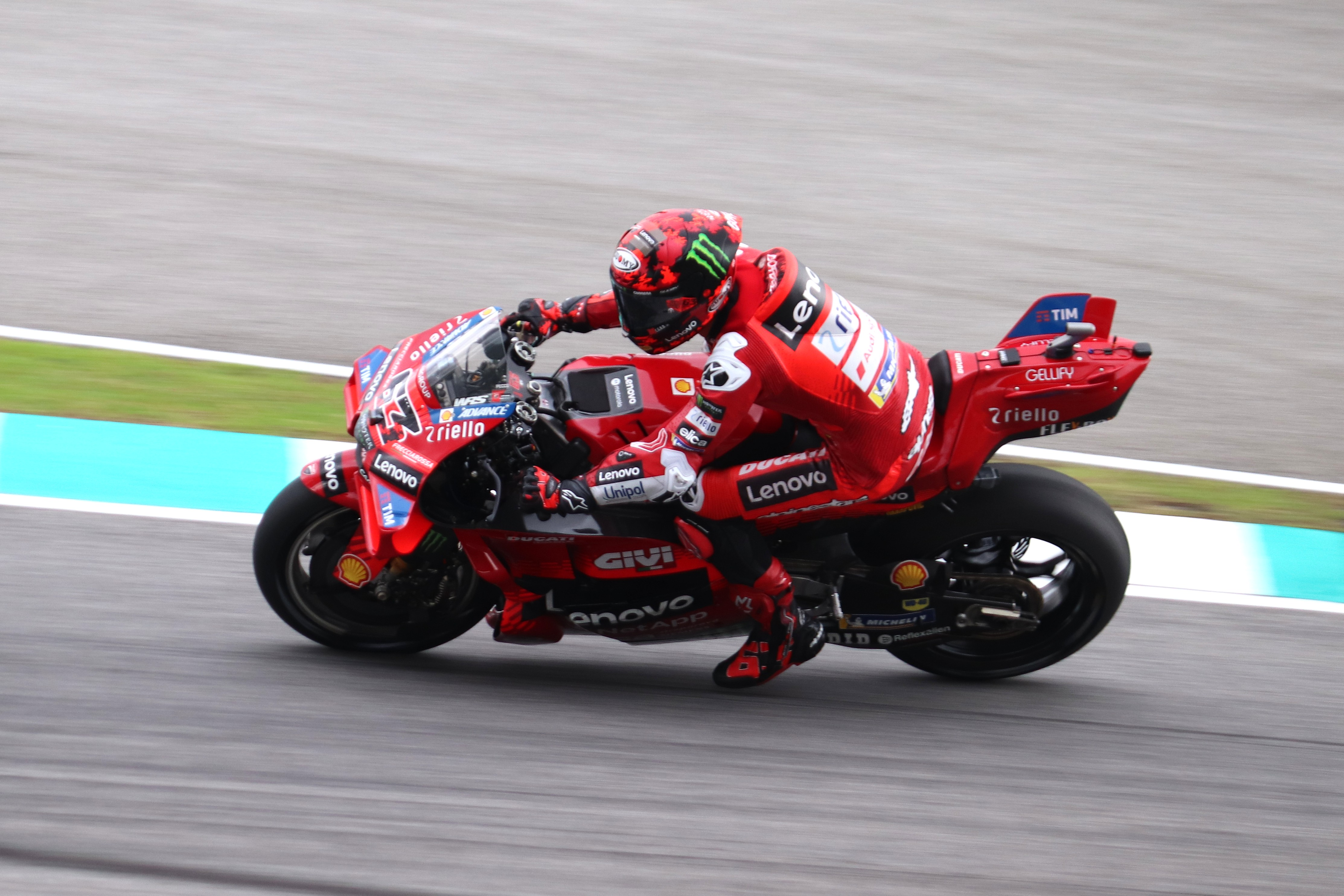
Francesco Bagnaia, riding a Ducati Desmosedici, at Sepang (2025)

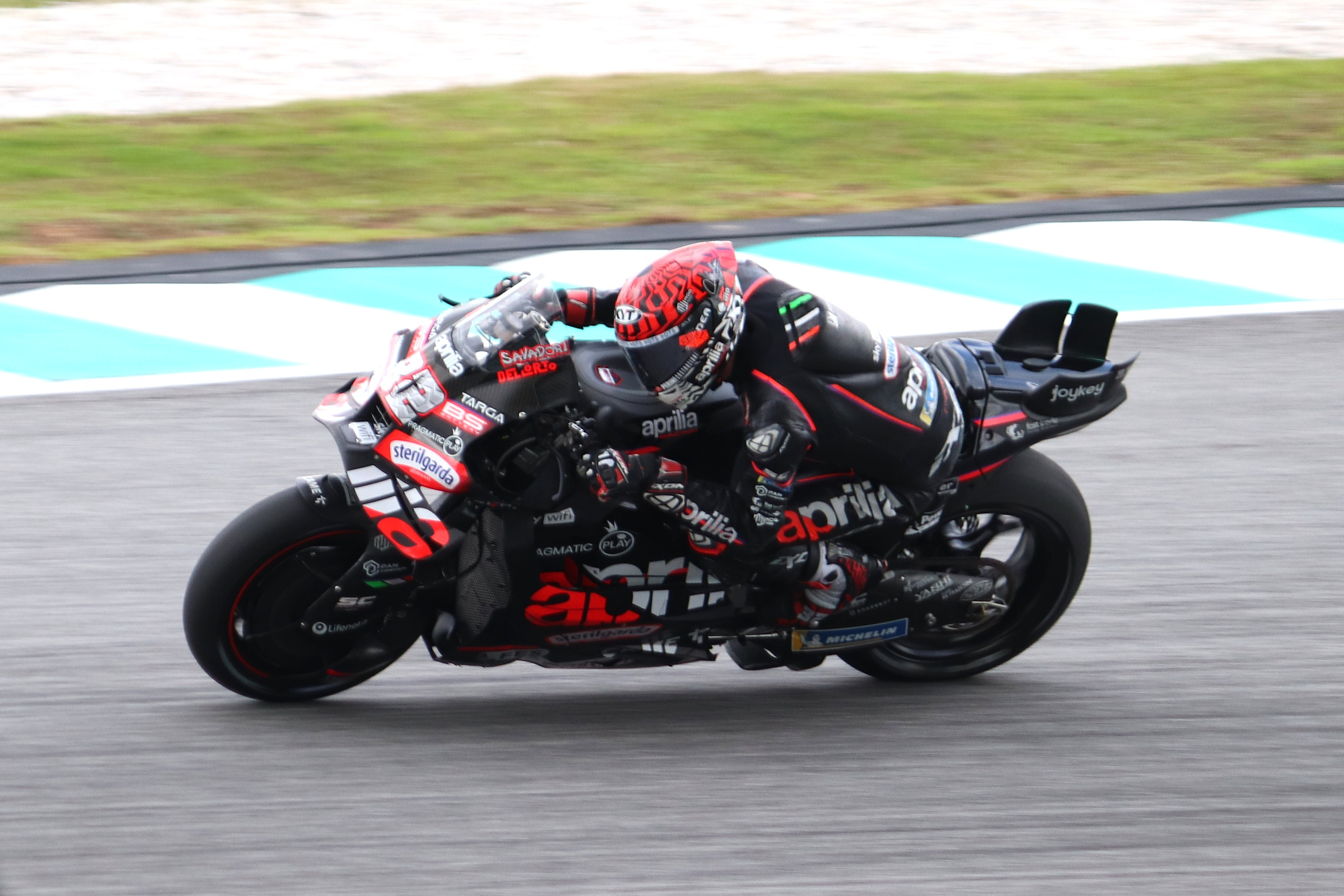
Lorenzo Savadori, riding an Aprilia RS-GP, at Sepang (2025)

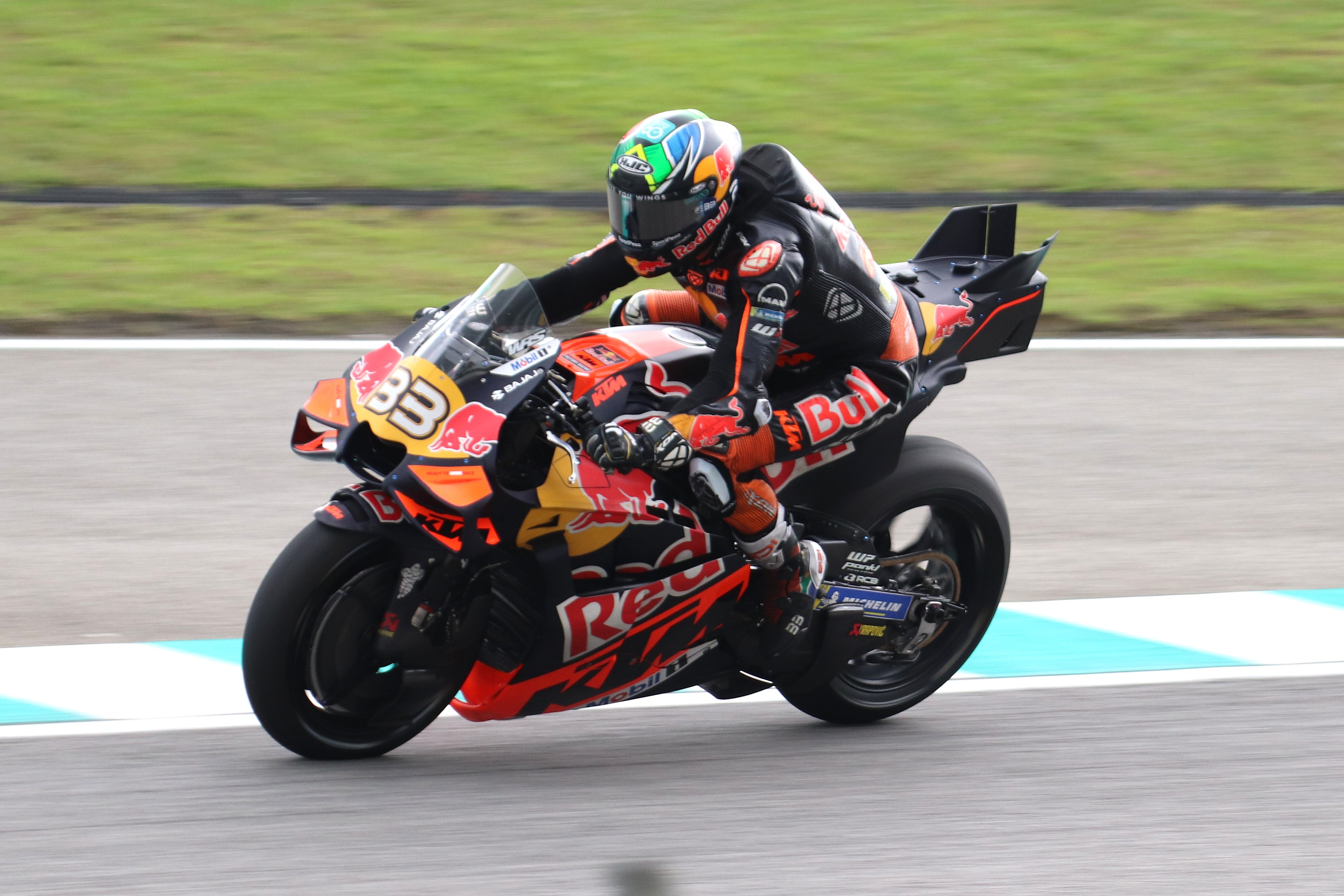
Brad Binder, riding a KTM RC16, at Sepang (2025)

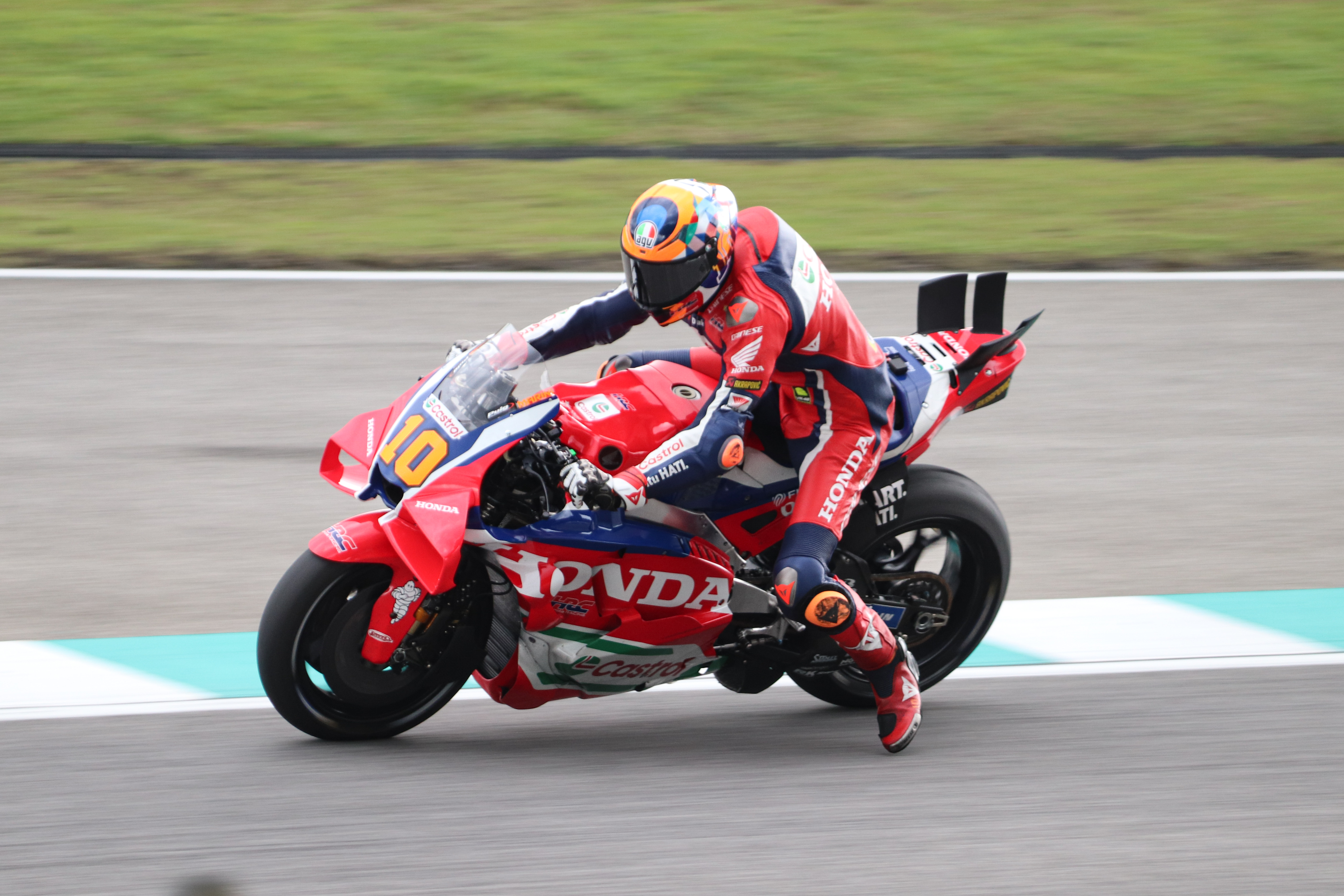
Luca Marini, riding a Honda RC213V, at Sepang (2025)

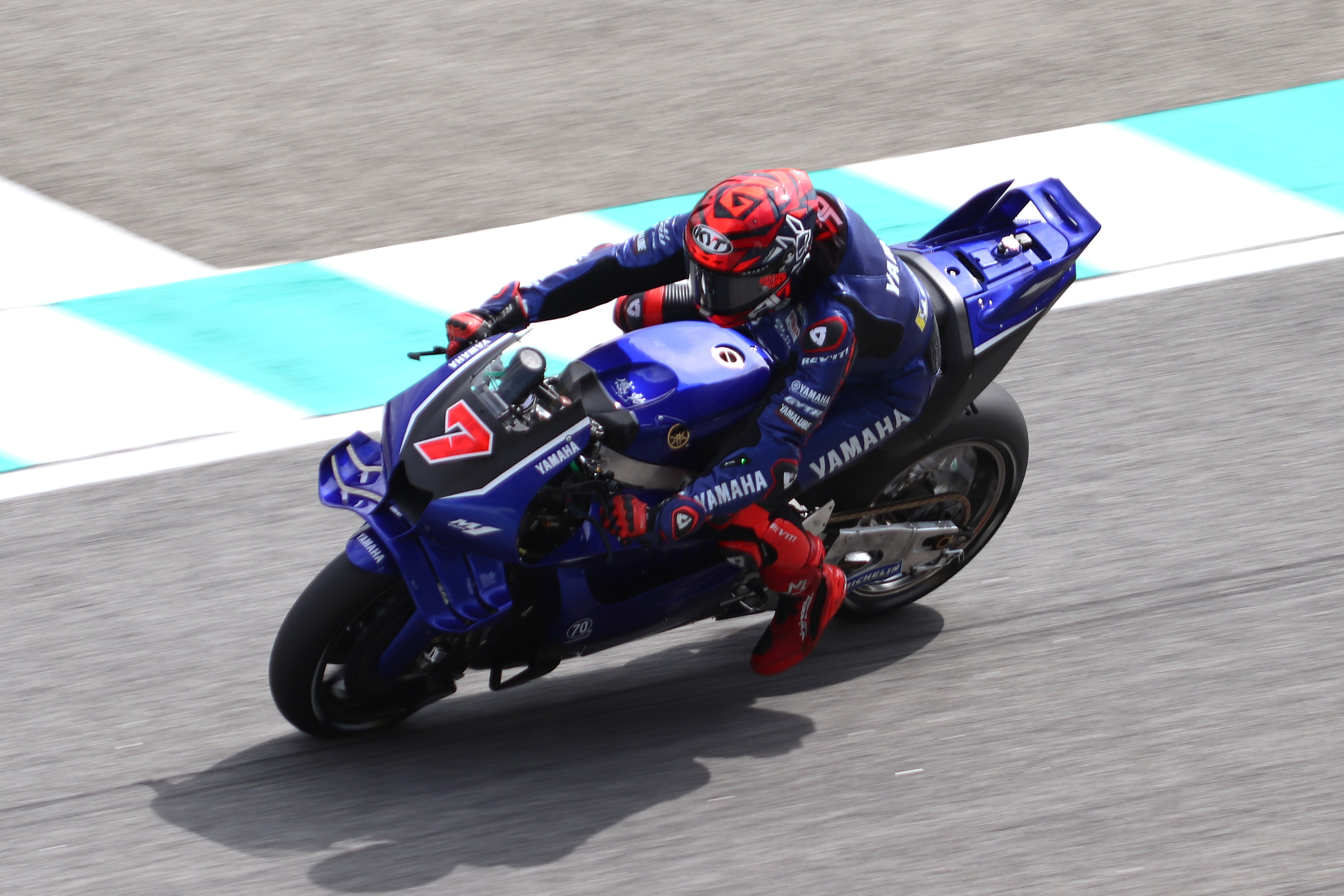
Augusto Fernández, riding a Yamaha YZR-M1, at Sepang (2025)

At the beginning of the new MotoGP era in 2002, 500cc two-stroke or 990cc four-stroke bikes were specified to race. The enormous power advantage of the twice as large displacement four-stroke engine over the half the size two-stroke meant that by the following season, no two-stroke bikes were racing. In 2007, the maximum engine capacity was reduced to 800cc without reducing the existing weight restriction.

MotoGP-class motorcycles are not restricted to any specific engine configuration. However, the number of cylinders employed in the engine determines the motorcycle's permitted minimum weight; the weight of the extra cylinders acts as a form of handicap. This is necessary because, for a given capacity, an engine with more cylinders is capable of producing more power. If comparable bore to stroke ratios are employed, an engine with more cylinders will have a greater piston area and a shorter stroke. The increased piston area permits an increase in the total valve area, allowing more air and fuel to be drawn into the engine, and the shorter stroke permits higher revs at the same piston speed, allowing the engine to pump still more air and fuel with the potential to produce more power, but with more fuel consumption too. In 2004 motorcycles were entered with three-, four-, and five-cylinder configurations. A six-cylinder engine was proposed by Blata, but it did not reach the MotoGP grids. Presently four-cylinder engines appear to offer the best compromise between weight, power, and fuel consumption as all competitors in the 2009 series used this solution in either 'V' or in-line configuration.

In 2002, the FIM became concerned about the advances in design and engineering that resulted in higher speeds around the race track; regulation changes related to weight, amount of available fuel and engine capacity were introduced. The amended rules reduced engine capacity to 800cc from 990cc and restricted the amount of available fuel for race distance from 26 litres (5.7 imp gal; 6.9 US gal) in year 2004 to 21 litres (4.6 imp gal; 5.5 US gal) in year 2007 and onwards. In addition, the minimum weight of four-cylinder bikes used by all participating teams was increased by 3 kg (6.6 lb).

On 11 December 2009, the Grand Prix Commission announced that the MotoGP class would switch to the 1,000cc motor limit starting in the 2012 season. Maximum displacement was limited to 1,000cc, maximum cylinders were limited to four, and maximum bore was capped at 81 mm (3.2 inches). Carmelo Ezpeleta, the CEO of Dorna Sports, indicated that the projected changes were received by the teams favorably.

From 2012, teams not entered by one of the major manufacturers could seek "claiming rule team" (CRT) status. Claiming rule team were intended to allow independent teams to be competitive at a lower cost and increase the number of entries in MotoGP. Claiming rule teams benefitted from less restrictive rules on the number of engines that could be used in a season, and with larger fuel allowances during the races. Under the claiming rule, CRTs agree to allow up to four of their engines per season to be claimed, after a race, by one of the major manufacturer teams at a cost of €20,000 each including transmission, or €15,000 each for the engine alone. From the 2014 season, the CRT class was dropped in favour of an "Open Class" specification – allowing teams using the control ECU hardware and software certain benefits to increase their competitiveness.

From 2023, front ride height – or holeshot – devices were banned. These devices have been common place in MotoGP since the back-end of 2018, when Ducati first introduced a system that could lower the rear of its bike to help with acceleration off the line for race starts.

From 2027, all ride height devices will be banned. Maximum displacement will be 850cc and aerodynamics will be more tightly regulated. Motorcycles will use 100% sustainable fuel, up from 40% sustainable fuel the sport has used since 2024. GPS data for all riders will be available after each session. All teams will have their concession rank reset to B.

=== Moto2 class ===
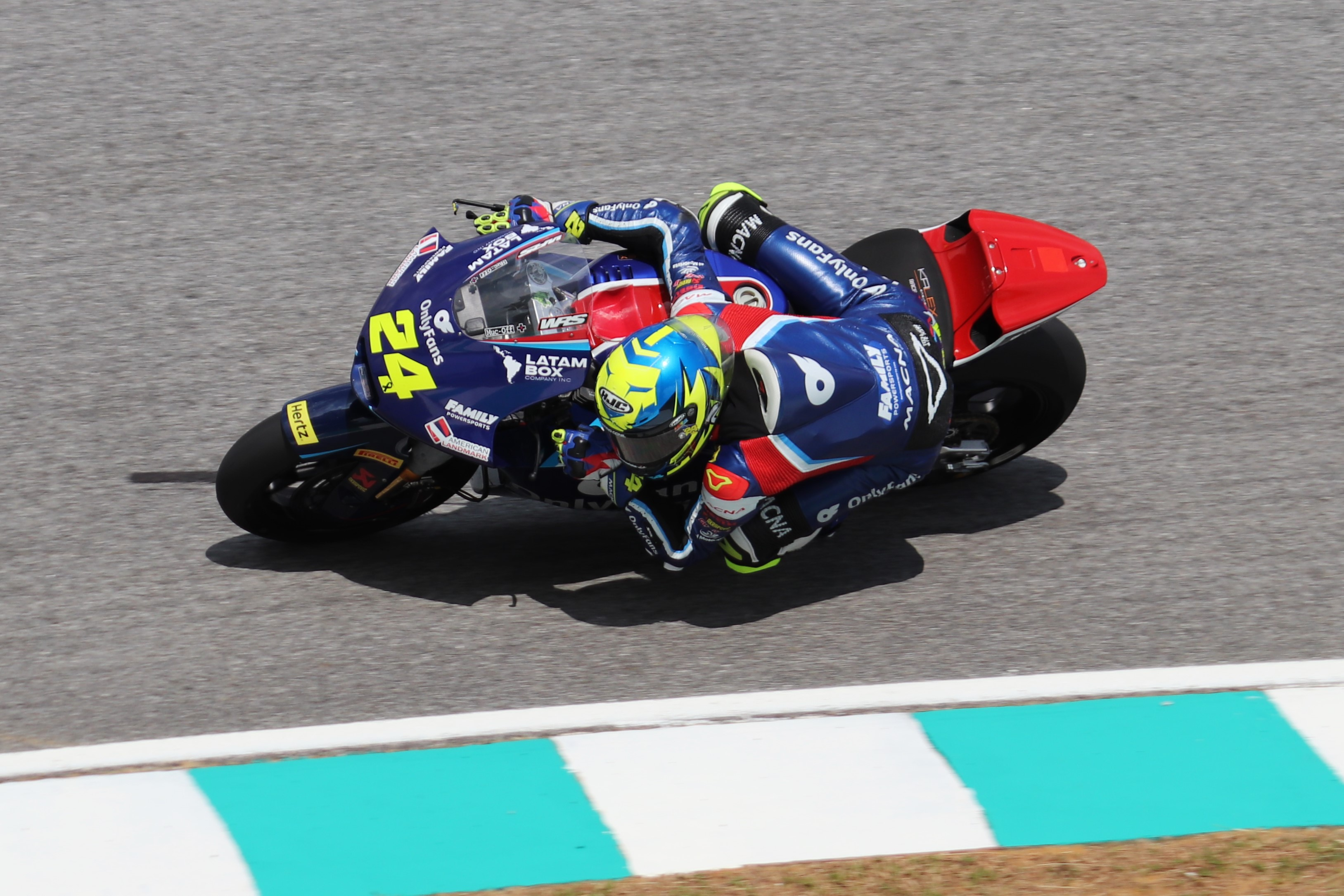
Marcos Ramírez, riding a Kalex Moto2, at Sepang (2024)

Moto2 was initially a 600cc four-stroke class introduced in 2010 to replace the traditional 250cc two-stroke class. Engines were supplied exclusively by Honda, tyres by Dunlop and electronics are limited and supplied only by FIM-sanctioned producers. Carbon brake discs are banned, only steel brake discs are allowed. However, there are no chassis limitations. Until 2019, only 600cc four-stroke Moto2 machines were allowed.

In 2019 Triumph replaced Honda as the sole supplier of Moto2 engines. The Triumph's engine configuration is 765cc displacement with three cylinders, contrasting with the previous Honda's 600cc in-line four. In 2024 Pirelli became the sole tyre supplier in Moto2 and Moto3, replacing Dunlop.

=== Moto3 class ===
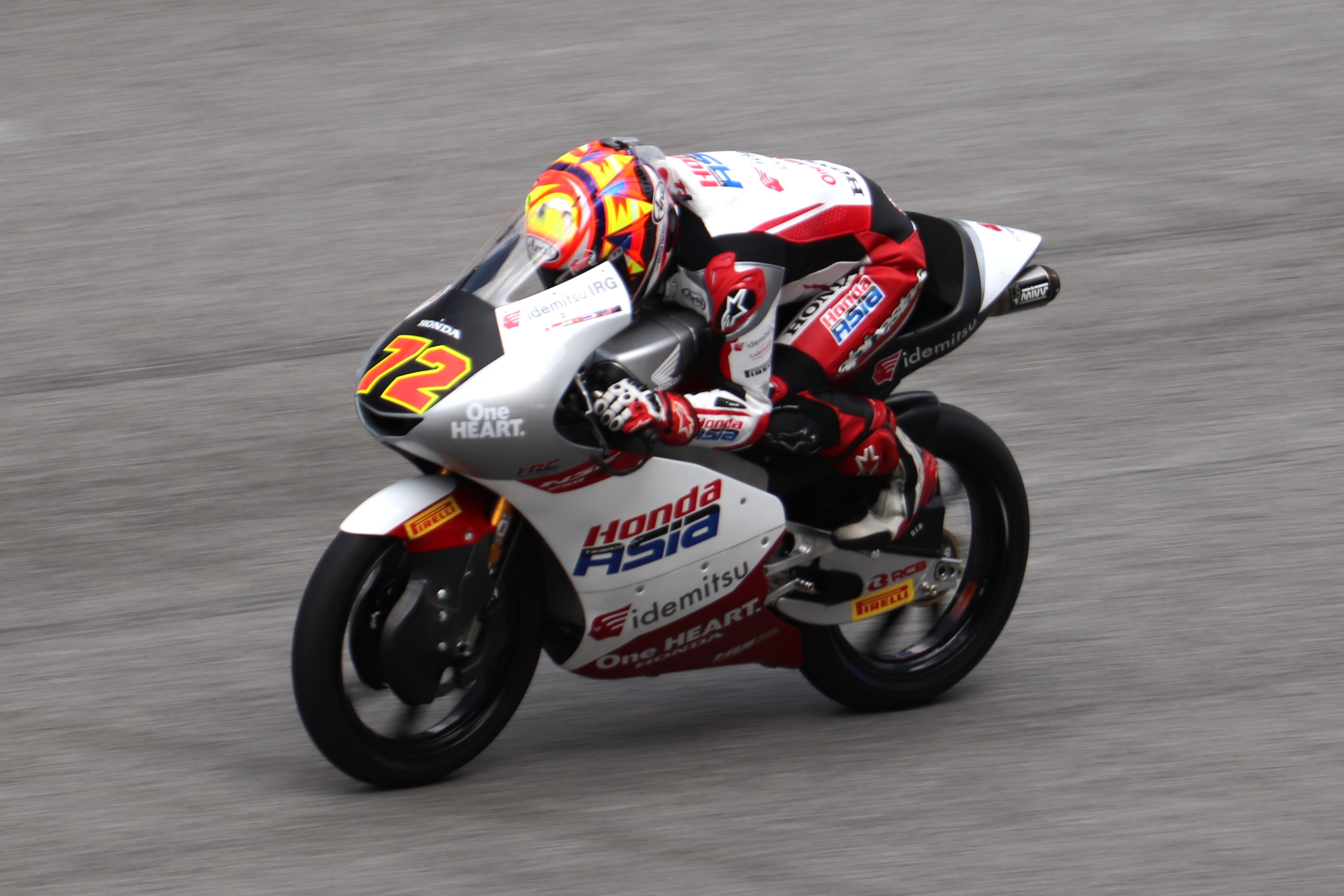
Taiyo Furusato, riding a Honda NSF250R, at Sepang (2024)

The 125cc class was replaced in 2012 by the Moto3 class. This class is restricted to single-cylinder 250cc four-stroke engines with a maximum bore of 81 mm (3.2 inches). The minimum total weight for motorcycle and rider is 148 kg (326 lb). Traditionally, the age limits for Moto3 were 16–28, with an upper limit of 25 for new contracted riders participating for the first time and wild-cards. A change of rules was introduced in 2014, allowing under-age FIM CEV Repsol Moto3 (junior) champions to participate in a subsequent Moto3 series at World Championship level. The first beneficiary of this rule-change was double (2013 and 2014) CEV champion Fabio Quartararo. However, after a rash of incidents involving young rider fatalities in lower classes, the FIM set a minimum age of 18 starting in the 2023 season.

=== Powertrain specifications ===
Specification	MotoGP	Moto2	Moto3
Manufacturer	Various	Honda (2010–2018); Triumph (from 2019)	Various (2012–2027); Yamaha (from 2028)
Configuration	75.5°-90° V-4/Inline-four	Inline-four (2010–2018); Inline-three (from 2019)	Single-cylinder (2012–2027); Inline-two (from 2028)
Displacement	990 cc (60 cu in) (2002–2006); 800 cc (49 cu in) (2007–2011); 1,000 cc (61 cu in) (2012–2026); 850 cc (52 cu in) (from 2027)	600 cc (37 cu in) (2010–2018); 765 cc (47 cu in) (from 2019)	250 cc (15 cu in) (2012–2027); 690 cc (42 cu in) (from 2028)
Combustion	Four-stroke		
Valvetrain	DOHC, four-valves per cylinder		
Fuel	Unleaded 95–102 octane gasoline (no control fuel)	eni blu super+ (2012–2015); Total unleaded 98 octane (2016–2019); Petronas Primax 97 RON unleaded gasoline (from 2020)	
Fuel delivery	Electronic indirect multi-point port fuel injection		
Aspiration	Naturally-aspirated		
Power	> 290 bhp (220 kW)	> 120 bhp (89 kW) (2010–2018) > 140 bhp (100 kW) (from 2019)	> 55 bhp (41 kW) (2012–2027) > 95 bhp (71 kW) (from 2028)
Torque	> 120 N⋅m (89 lbf⋅ft)	55–70 N⋅m (41–52 lbf⋅ft) (2010–2018); 80 N⋅m (59 lbf⋅ft) (from 2019)	28 N⋅m (21 lbf⋅ft) (2012–2027); 67 N⋅m (49 lbf⋅ft) (from 2028)
Power-to-weight ratio	~1.85 bhp/kg (0.84 bhp/lb)	~0,85 bhp/kg (0.38 bhp/lb) (2010–2018); ~1 bhp/kg (0.45 bhp/lb) (from 2019)	~0.6 bhp/kg (0.27 bhp/lb) (2012–2027); ~0.8 bhp/kg (0.36 bhp/lb) (from 2028)
Lubrication	Wet sump (no control lubricant)	Wet sump Repsol lubricant	
Rev limit	18,000 – 19,000 rpm	14,400 rpm	13,500 rpm
Maximum speed	368.6 km/h (229 mph)	308.5 km/h (192 mph)	258.6 km/h (161 mph)
Cooling	Single water pump		
Spark plugs	NGK		
Tyres	12/60-17 front and 20/69-17 rear	slick: 100/70 R17 front and 120/70 R17 rear; rain: 100/70 R17 front and 125/70 R17 rear	slick: 125/70 R17 front and 200/65 R17; rain: 120/70 R17 front and 200/60 R17 rear

=== Weights ===
Minimum weight – MotoGP Class
Number of cylinders	2002 minimum	2007 minimum	2010 minimum
2	135 kg (298 lb)	137 kg (302 lb)	135 kg (298 lb)
3	135 kg (298 lb)	140.5 kg (310 lb)	142.5 kg (314 lb)
4	145 kg (320 lb)	148 kg (326 lb)	150 kg (330 lb)
5	145 kg (320 lb)	155.5 kg (343 lb)	157.5 kg (347 lb)
6	155 kg (342 lb)	163 kg (359 lb)	165 kg (364 lb)

- In 2005, fuel tank capacity was reduced from 24 litres (5.3 imp gal; 6.3 US gal) to 22 litres (4.8 imp gal; 5.8 US gal).
- From 2007 onwards, and for a minimum period of five years, FIM has regulated in MotoGP class that two-stroke bikes will no longer be allowed. The maximum fuel capacity is to be 21 litres (4.6 imp gal; 5.5 US gal).
- From 2007 to 2011, engines were limited to 800cc four-strokes.
- In 2012 engine displacement was increased to 1000cc
- For the 2013 season minimum weight was increased to 160 kg (350 lb).
- In 2014, fuel tank capacity was reduced from 21 litres to 20 litres (4.4 imp gal; 5.3 US gal) for the Factory Entries, and was increased to 24 litres for the Open Entries.
- For the 2015 season minimum weight was decreased to 158 kg (348 lb)
- In 2016, fuel tank capacity was mandated at 22 litres for all classes.

=== Tyres ===
Tyre selection is critical, usually done by the individual rider based on bike 'feel' during practice, qualifying and the pre-race warm-up laps on the morning of the race, as well as the predicted weather. The typical compromise is between grip and longevity—softer compound tyres have more traction, but wear out more quickly; harder compound tyres have less traction, but are more likely to last the entire race. Conserving rubber throughout a race is a specific skill winning riders acquire. Special 'Q' or qualifying tyres of extreme softness and grip were typically used during grid-qualifying sessions until their use was discontinued at the end of the 2008 season, but they lasted typically no longer than one or two laps, though they could deliver higher qualifying speeds. In wet conditions, special tyres ('wets') with full treads are used, but they suffer extreme wear if the track dries out.

In 2007 new MotoGP regulations limited the number of tyres any rider could use over the practice and qualifying period, and the race itself, to a maximum of 31 tyres (14 fronts and 17 rears) per rider. This introduced a problem of tyre choice versus weather (among other factors) that challenges riders and teams to optimize their performance on race day. This factor was greeted with varying degrees of enthusiasm by participants. Bridgestone had dominated in 2007 and Michelin riders Valentino Rossi, Nicky Hayden, Dani Pedrosa, and Colin Edwards all acknowledged shortcomings in Michelin's race tyres relative to Bridgestone. Rossi, disappointed with and critical of the performance of his Michelin tyres, switched to Bridgestones for 2008 and won the world championship in dominant fashion. Pedrosa controversially switched to Bridgestones during the 2008 season.

In 2008, the rules were amended to allow more tyres per race weekend—18 fronts and 22 rears for a total of 40 tyres. The lower number of tyres per weekend was considered a handicap to Michelin riders. The only MotoGP team using Dunlop Tyres in 2007, Yamaha Tech 3, did not use them in 2008 but switched to Michelin.

For 2009, 2010, and 2011, a 'spec' tyre supplier, Bridgestone, was appointed by the FIM (with Michelin no longer supplying any tyres to MotoGP and returning to the category in 2016). For the whole season Bridgestone provided four specifications of front tyre, six of rear, and a single wet specification—with no qualifying specification. For each round Bridgestone provided only two specifications for front and rear. Tyres are assigned to riders randomly to assure impartiality. Jorge Lorenzo has publicly supported the mono tyre rule.

At the end of the 2015 season, Bridgestone withdrew as tyre supplier of MotoGP. Following a formal tender, French tyre manufacturer Michelin became the official supplier for the 2016 season, marking their return to the series and testing began in Aragon immediately after the end of the 2015 season.

As of 2026, MotoGP motorcyles use 12/60-17 front tires and 20/69-17 rear tires.

After the first race of the 2025 season, it was announced that Pirelli will be the tyre supplier of MotoGP from 2027, which includes the Moto2 and Moto3 Championships using Pirelli since 2024.

== In media ==
- Hitting the Apex, a documentary film about MotoGP, was released in 2015 and is now available on DVD.
- Faster, a documentary film about MotoGP, was released in 2003 and is now available on DVD.
- Fastest, a documentary film about MotoGP, was released in 2011 and is now available on DVD.
- MotoGP Unlimited, a documentary film about MotoGP, was released in 2022.

=== Video games ===
Early Grand Prix video games include Grand Prix 500cc (1987), Cycles: International GP Racing (1989), Grand Prix 500 2 (1991) and GP-1 (1993). The first simulator was GP 500, launched in 1999. In the early 2000s, THQ published five video games for Windows and Xbox platforms, the first being MotoGP: Ultimate Racing Technology (2002) and the last MotoGP '07 (2007), whereas Namco of Japan published and in-house developed five video games for PlayStation platforms starting with MotoGP (2000) and ending with MotoGP (2006). In 2007, Capcom became the new PlayStation publisher and worked together with Italy-based Milestone to produce MotoGP '07 (PS2) and some of its successors. In 2008, THQ lost the MotoGP licence and Capcom became the exclusive publisher.

MotoGP 2010, an iOS game made in 2010 by I-Play, released on 3 September 2010 and was not received well by critics after having a 43% rating on Metacritic. MotoGP 10/11 was released by Capcom on 15 March 2011, for the PlayStation 3 and Xbox 360. Metacritic gave the game a rating of 72%.

In 2013, Milestone got the exclusive license for MotoGP video games, a contract that will now last until at least 2026. The first game in this run of their contract was MotoGP 13, which was released on 21 June 2013 on PlayStation Vita, PlayStation 3, and Xbox 360. The game received mixed reviews and scored 73%. As of May 2026, the latest release is MotoGP 26 on PlayStation 5, Nintendo Switch, Nintendo Switch 2, Microsoft Windows and Xbox Series X/S.

The game GPBikes allows players to ride Grand Prix bikes such as the Cagiva 500.

== See also ==
- MotoGP Rookie of the Year
- Outline of motorcycles and motorcycling
- Grand Prix motorcycle racing sponsorship liveries
- List of Grand Prix motorcycle races
- List of 500cc/MotoGP World Riders' Champions
- List of Grand Prix motorcycle racing European champions
