= Straight Up (book) =

2010 book by Joseph J. Romm

- Cover of Straight Up
- Author: Joseph J. Romm
- Language: English
- Subject: Global warming
- Publisher: Island Press
- Publication date: 2010
- ISBN: 1-59726-716-3
- Preceded by: Hell and High Water
- Followed by: Language Intelligence

Straight Up: America's Fiercest Climate Blogger Takes on the Status Quo Media, Politicians, and Clean Energy Solutions is a book by author, blogger, physicist and climate expert Joseph J. Romm. A Fellow of the American Association for the Advancement of Science and former Acting Assistant Secretary of the U.S. Department of Energy, Romm writes about methods of reducing global warming and increasing energy security through energy efficiency, green energy technologies and green transportation technologies.

Romm writes and edits the climate blog ClimateProgress.org for the Center for American Progress, where he is a Senior Fellow. Time magazine named this blog one of the "Top 15 Green Websites" and called Romm "The Web's most influential climate-change blogger", naming him as one of its "Heroes of the Environment (2009)".

Straight Up was released on April 19, 2010, by Island Press. It is "largely a selection of [Romm]'s best blog postings over the past few years related to climate change issues". TreeHugger describes the book as "a whirlwind tour through the state of climate change, the media that so badly neglects it, the politicians who attempt to address it (and those who obstruct their efforts and ignore [the] science), and the clean energy solutions that could help get us out of the mess."

== Summary ==
The title of the book's introduction, "Why I blog", is a play on the title of George Orwell's essay, "Why I Write". Romm states, "I joined the new media because the old media have failed us. They have utterly failed to force us to face unpleasant facts. From this starting point, Romm posits that global warming is a bipartisan issue. He writes, "Averting catastrophic global warming requires completely overturning the status quo, changing every aspect of how we use energy – and doing so in under four decades. Failure to do so means humanity's self-destruction." The book collects, reprints and updates postings from his blog, ClimateProgress.org, as the main part of his content, adding introductions and some new analysis.

In his first chapter, Romm argues that the media perpetuates the status quo through laziness and a misunderstanding of how to present a "balanced" story. For example, he believes that the media did a bad job of assessing the outcome of the Copenhagen summit in December 2009. Romm comments that global warming is a science story, but that the traditional news media, which has scaled back on specialized reporting, has given the story to political reporters who don't understand, and have not time to research, the scientific consensus. He next presents research concerning the science of climate change, as explained by what Romm calls "uncharacteristically blunt scientists".

In the third chapter, Straight Up presents proposed solutions to reducing greenhouse gas emissions through the use of clean energy technologies and other currently available technologies. For example, it describes what Romm believes are the advantages of plug-in hybrid electric vehicles, generation of energy through wind and solar power, including concentrated solar power using mirrors to concentrate the sun's energy. He writes that "A 20 percent reduction in global emissions might be possible in a quarter century with net economic benefits". "Our plan", says Romm, must be "Deployment, deployment, deployment, R&D, deployment, deployment, deployment." The next chapter discusses peak oil.

The next chapters move into the politics of global warming and what Romm sees as a "right-wing disinformation machine" that confuses and misleads the public, by, for example, fostering what Romm calls "Anti-Scientific Syndrome". The book says, "the economic cost of action is low, whereas the cost of inaction is incalculably greater – what exactly is the 'price' of 5 feet of sea level rise in 2100 ... and losing all of the inland glaciers that provide a significant fraction of water to a billion people? Or the price of losing half the world's species? ... the bottom line is that the economic cost of action is low, whereas the cost of inaction is incalculably greater". Romm calculates that deployment of existing technologies on the massive scale that can save the climate can be accomplished at the cost of 0.12 percent of global GDP per year.

Romm advocates citizen action to pressure Washington and industry to act quickly and decisively to reduce greenhouse emissions. Otherwise, he argues, we will fall behind in the race to commercialize profitable technologies. "China has a excellent track record of achieving gains in energy efficiency and has begun to ramp up its efficiency efforts and aggressively expand its carbon-free electricity targets (recently committing, for instance, to triple its wind goal to 100,000 MW by 2020). ... will the United States be a global leader in creating jobs and exports in clean energy technologies or will we be importing them from Europe, Japan, and the likely clean energy leader in our absence, China"?

In the last chapter, Romm posits that progressives are "lousy" at educating the public, and he offers ways in which he thinks they can be more effective at messaging. In his conclusion at the end of the book, Romm argues that the global economy is a sort of ponzi scheme, in which our failure to prevent the worst effects of climate change now could eventually cause the world economy to fall apart just like a ponzi scheme.

== Reception ==
=== Initial reviews ===
A review in USA Today called the book "a gut-wrenching wakeup call". Thomas L. Friedman, in his op-ed column in The New York Times, called the book "insightful", agreeing with Romm's arguments in the book that the proposed "cap and trade" climate bill "is a step in the right direction toward reducing greenhouse gases and expanding our base of clean power technologies". Former US Vice-President Al Gore endorsed the book as "important" on his blog, writing, "If you are interested in the fight to solve the climate crisis, I recommend you read this book."

The book has been reviewed by many of the "green" websites. For example, the blog of the American Solar Energy Society, Solar Today, commented, "It's a collection of spirited and readable critiques of the delaying forces – the corporations and institutions who want to see no changes in national policies and tax codes that now work to make them rich. In particular, Romm eviscerates the American news establishment for ignoring climate catastrophe issues". ... It's full of solid fact-based arguments, properly referenced within the text (no footnotes!), along with a lot of low-carbon fire and brimstone. Daily Kos commented, "Romm's forceful, impassioned blogging – and his book publishing – are a shining light in the confrontation of those 'misguided seals of approval'" being given out by the mainstream press to climate disinformers. The review continues, "Romm is a tenacious fighter ... ready to take on all comers to the point that he can even rub 'friends' and allies the wrong way at times. ... Romm's knowledge, writing skills, and passion enable most to see past those conflicts since, on so many issues, Romm is simply – well – correct and laying out viable paths forward. ... Simply put, if the 'nation' would read Straight Up and follow Romm's prescriptions, we would find ourselves moving away from decline into a new era of prosperity." The Green Energy Reporter stated that "Straight Up's indictment of "status-quo media" like The New York Times lays bare the inadequacies of traditional he-said-she-said media coverage when faced with a civilizational challenge like climate change. ... Strong opinions, muscular writing."

Reporter Tyler Hamilton calls the book "a stinging critique of how poorly the mainstream media has covered global warming" and says that the book, like Romm's blog, "cuts through the crap in a way no mainstream media outlet has or will." A review in TreeHugger termed the book "an essential guide to climate, energy, and politics for the blog era." It continued, "nobody knows the game like Romm – both in terms of ability to interpret and explain the latest science, and in boasting expertise on the politics and policy process that, whether you like it our not, is going to be instrumental in mitigating climate change on a large scale." Even for readers of Romm's blog, the book "provides an important narrative flow, and condenses everything you need to know about the current state of climate science and politics into a nice, quick read. While extremely thorough, it may make some beginners' head spin, and it can get combative and wonky in places. But such is the nature of this beast – climate change should make a beginner's head spin, and as Romm makes clear, addressing it is going to be messy, politically charged, and a daunting battle." The Environmental Defense Fund review opined, "Straight Up is well-researched, provides insightful political analysis, and showcases compelling data on the economic benefits of climate change solutions."

Ross Gelbspan reviewed the book for Grist magazine, writing that Romm's "unfailing sense of priorities shines through his startlingly thoughtful and brutally blunt writing." Gelbspan continues, "while one wishes Romm would have stitched the blog posts together into a more coherent narrative – and omitted a few that addressed transitory, fleeting events – his book is absolutely on point in its insistence that climate change long ago ceased to be a scientific issue and, instead, is most clearly a political one." Gelbspan agrees with Romm that "a central reason that most political conservatives and libertarians deny the reality of human-induced climate change 'is that they simply cannot stand the solution. So they attack both the solution and the science.' I don't recall reading that simple truth in [traditional media,] virtually all of which treat the climate debate as though it actually had some legitimacy." He also agrees with Romm that the major media "have failed, in the name of 'journalistic balance', to distinguish between legitimate, peer-reviewed scientific research and the deliberate obfuscation by a cadre of climate skeptics, many of whom have been funded by coal and oil companies. As a result, the public has no idea that we are already at a point of no return in terms of staving off climate chaos." Gelbspan notes, "Romm happens to favor both efficiency and concentrated solar thermal power. But, his technological preferences aside, he's right on point when he describes the call for more R&D as a stalling tactic to avoid coming to grips with the threat. As Romm writes, 'deployment completely trumps research'." However, Gelbspan criticizes Romm for "wandering", at the end of the book, "into the question of why climate advocates are so bad at 'messaging.' It may be a valid question. ... But I'm afraid the issue [is] a diversion from the real question facing all of us at this moment of history. ... We are already beginning to see crop failures, water shortages, increasing extinctions, migrations of environmental refugees, and all manner of potential breakdowns in our social lives. Where Straight Up falls short is in its failure to deal with this reality head on." Still, he says, "This is not at all to minimize the value of Romm's book. To the contrary, if you think the most pressing task today is to limit the coming damage through a transition to non-carbon technologies, I can't think of a better place to start than by reading Straight Up."

=== Later assessments ===
In June 2010, FDL Book Salon said of the book, "the whole is greater than the sum of the parts. By pulling together the very best content from the blog and thoughtfully organizing it in a logical way, the book achieves ... cohesiveness. ... [What makes Romm's] writing on climate change and energy policy so valuable is his comprehensive knowledge of the subject matter." A review the same month in the New Zealand climate blog Hot Topic contains a detailed summary of the book. A July 2010 review in RenewableEnergyWorld.com agreed with Romm that "with the little time we have left to avert climate chaos, we must devote most of our resources to deploying existing technologies like solar, wind and geothermal that we know can bring atmospheric carbon back down down to safe levels."

In July 2010, Bill McKibben wrote in Washington Monthly:

Romm ... knows his climate science ... cold. Trained as a physicist, he is unintimidated by scholarly work, and is able to synthesize huge amounts of complex data. He has been a persuasive voice for the most important truth about global warming: that it is a far worse problem than either politicians or the general public understand. In his posts and in his previous book Hell and High Water Romm has made the stakes clear. "If we stay anywhere near our current emissions path," he writes, the century will bring "staggeringly high temperature rise ... [and] sea level rise. ... Dust bowls will cover the southwestern United States and many other heavily populated regions around the globe. Massive species loss will occur on land and sea – affecting 50 percent or more of all life." These changes ... are relatively uncontroversial middle-of-the-road projections. ... Romm's willingness to repeat these concerns ... has been essential in emboldening a few opinion writers – Tom Friedman, for instance – to keep this message in the mainstream media. ... Romm has been consistent in insisting that we have much of the technology necessary to at least begin tackling the problem. He regularly documents the gains we could easily squeeze from commonsense efficiencies ... [and current technologies,] the plug-in hybrid car, for example. ... Romm is very clear on the economics of climate change: any large-scale adjustment, while not cheap, is affordable, and neglecting the issue as we have done will prove to be very expensive in the long run. Indeed, it's hard to read him without understanding just how disingenuous and shortsighted is the Republican argument that we should ignore global warming because it will cost us money. ... The [2009] McKinsey report ... estimate[s that] most of the first few decades of carbon trimming will actually make us money. ...

The second half of Straight Up ... covers the politics of climate. [Romm has been] a tireless foil to the "right-wing disinformation machine" that has tried – with great success ... to delay action by confusing and disheartening Americans about global warming. The right's basic message ... is not supported by the evidence. It is, however, supported by both a good deal of fossil-fuel industry cash and a good deal of wishful thinking from all of us who are so used to the lifestyles underwritten by cheap fossil fuel. It requires a thick skin to take on the daily task of dealing with the disinformers, but Romm has the taste for this kind of blood sport, and the talent as well. He coined the term "anti-science syndrome" (and its rude acronym) for the campaign to undermine the scientific consensus. He's waged memorable wars with, say, Lord Monckton ... who dropped his earlier campaign to quarantine all AIDS sufferers. ... Romm is also stern with progressives, mostly for their poor messaging on climate issues. ... In fact, my main dispute with Romm's work is his relentless focus on Washington. Since the advent of the Obama administration he has devoted a great deal of his fierceness to attacking anyone who questions the legislative solutions to climate change put forward by the Democrats in the White House and Congress. ... It's not that his message is absurd. We do desperately need action from Washington on climate change. ... But Romm's hyper-realism may ignore more important political possibilities. He's paid less attention to the emerging popular movement on climate change than to the machinations of the Senate, but if we're actually going to get change on the scale we need, it's quite possible it won't happen without an aggressive, large, and noisy movement demanding that change. And Romm, who would have a good deal of useful things to say to such a movement, hasn't been very interested.

== See also ==
- Individual and political action on climate change
- Carbon diet
- Climate change response
- Economics of global warming
- Effects of global warming
- Global warming controversy
- The Hype about Hydrogen
- List of environmental books
- List of books about renewable energy
- Mitigation of global warming
- Politics of global warming
- Who Killed the Electric Car?
