= Joe Romm =

American writer and editor (1960–2026)

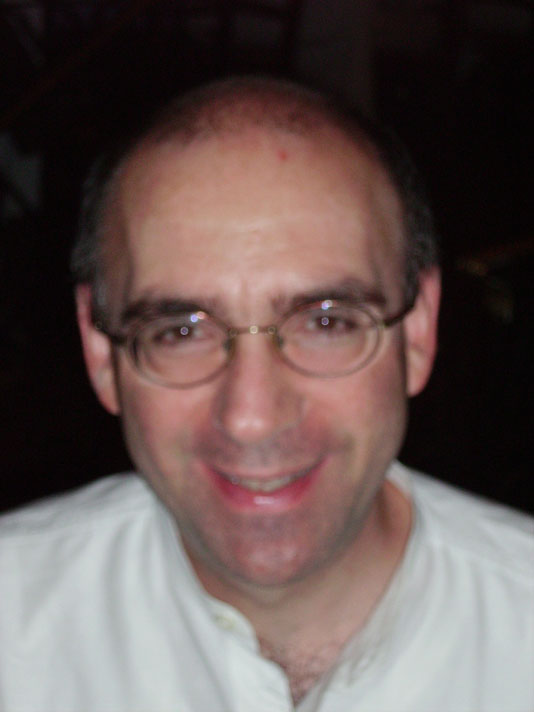
Joe Romm, 2007

Joseph Jacob Romm (June 27, 1960 – September 14, 2026) was an American researcher, author, editor, physicist and climate expert. He advocated for reducing greenhouse gas emissions to limit global warming and increasing energy security through energy efficiency and green energy technologies. In 2009, Rolling Stone magazine named Romm to its list of "100 People Who Are Changing America", and Time magazine named him one of its "Heroes of the Environment (2009)", calling him "The Web's most influential climate-change blogger".

In the 1990s, Romm served as the Principal Deputy Assistant Secretary at the U.S. Department of Energy rising to Acting Assistant Secretary. At the Center for American Progress, in 2006, he founded the blog Climate Progress, which became part of the Think Progress website. Time magazine named Romm's blog one of the "Top 15 Green Websites". In 2009, Thomas L. Friedman, in The New York Times, called Climate Progress "the indispensable blog", and Time included it in a list of the 25 "Best Blogs of 2010". Romm was the chief science advisor for the documentary series Years of Living Dangerously, which won the 2014 Emmy Award for Outstanding Documentary or Nonfiction Series. In 2019, he founded and served as the first editor-in-chief of the progressive news aggregator Front Page Live. Throughout these decades, he wrote on climate, energy security, as well as language and persuasion, for news sources and journals, and lectured at universities and other organizations. Romm ended his career as a senior research fellow at the University of Pennsylvania's Penn Center for Science, Sustainability and the Media, writing white papers about climate disinformation.

Romm published ten books and many articles on global warming, clean energy and communications. His 2006 book Hell and High Water summarizes observations and forecasts of climate change, discussed technology and policy solutions, and criticized political disinformation used to undermine climate science. His 2015 book, Climate Change: What Everyone Needs to Know, covers basic climate science in a Q&A format. He also wrote books on how scientists and activists can communicate more persuasively to explain science and policy to the public. His 2012 book, Language Intelligence, concerns the effective use of rhetoric, and his 2018 book, How to Go Viral and Reach Millions, discusses how to tell scientific stories in ways that draw attention and connect with people emotionally. His 2025 revised edition of The Hype About Hydrogen decries what he calls "false promises" made by the fossil fuel industry and sets forth the solutions that Romm says can save the climate.

== Life and career ==
=== Early life and career ===
Romm was born on June 27, 1960, and grew up in Middletown, New York, the youngest of three sons of Al Romm (1926–1999), managing editor of the Times Herald-Record newspaper, and Ethel Grodzins Romm, an author, journalist, project manager, CEO of an environmental technology company and, later, chair of the Lyceum Society of the New York Academy of Sciences. His uncle is physicist Lee Grodzins, and his aunt was library science expert Anne Grodzins Lipow. Romm graduated from Middletown High School in 1978.

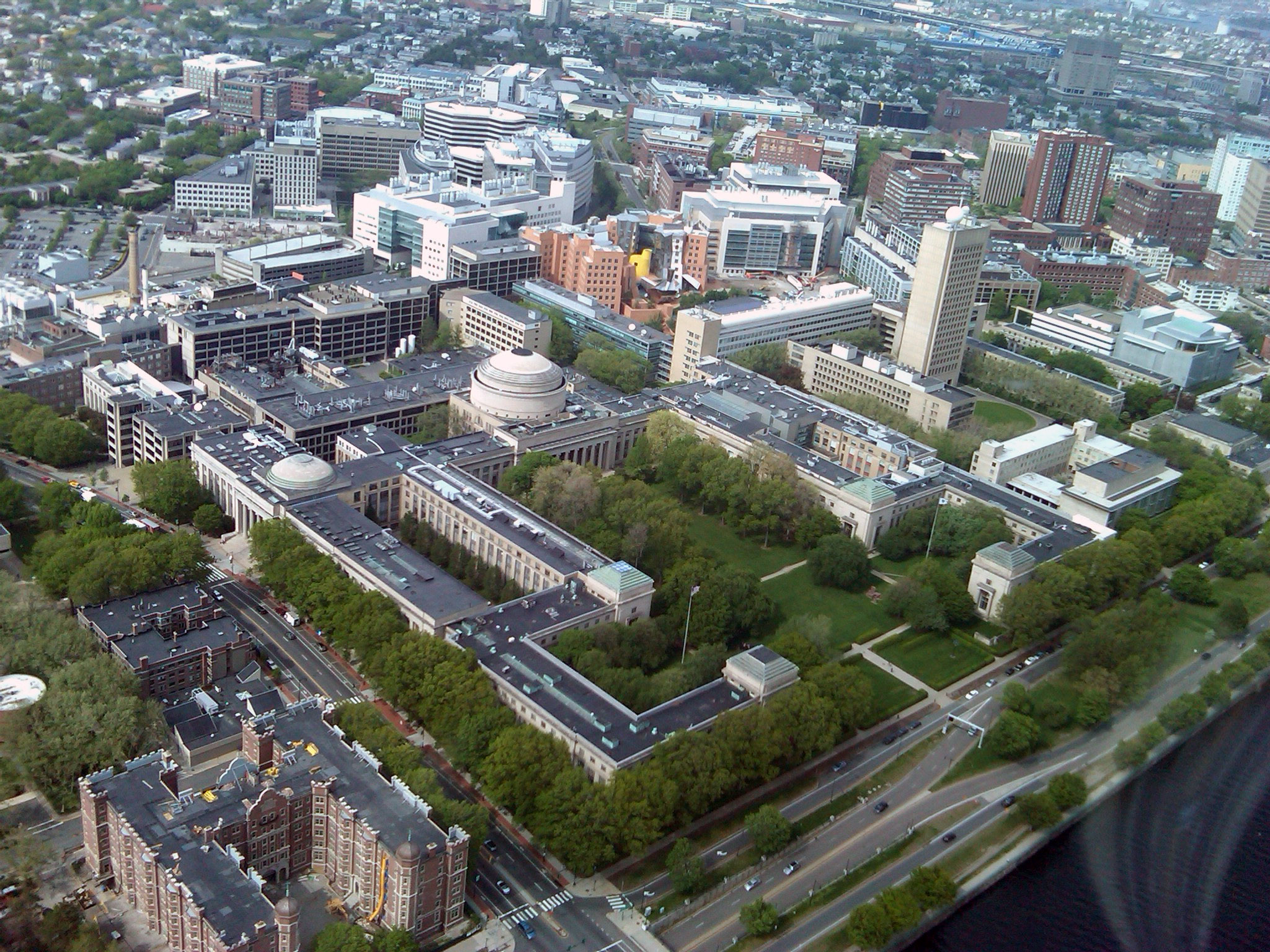
The campus of MIT, where Romm earned his Ph.D in physics in 1987.

Romm attended the Massachusetts Institute of Technology, where he earned a Bachelor of Science degree in 1982 and a Ph.D. in 1987, both in physics. In 1987, Romm was awarded an American Physical Society Congressional Science Fellowship for the U.S. House of Representatives, where he provided science and security policy advice on the staff of Representative Charles E. Bennett.

From 1988 to 1990, Romm worked as Special Assistant for International Security at the Rockefeller Foundation. From 1991 to 1993, he was a researcher at the Rocky Mountain Institute. He co-authored the 1994 Rocky Mountain Institute Report, Greening the Building and the Bottom Line: Increasing Productivity Through Energy-Efficient Design. For the Global Environment and Technology Foundation, he performed the first environmental analysis of a system integrating cogenerating fuel cells, fly wheels, and power electronics aimed at achieving very high-availability power.

In 1992, Romm published The Once and Future Superpower, a book about America's economic, energy and environmental security. In 1993, he wrote Defining National Security: The Nonmilitary Aspects, for the Council on Foreign Relations. His 1994 book, Lean and Clean Management, discusses management techniques that can reduce the impact of manufacturing and other industries on the environment while increasing productivity and profits. The same year, he co-authored a paper for the ACEEE Summer Study on Energy Efficiency in Buildings on "Policies to Reduce Heat Islands". In 1999, Romm published Cool Companies: How the Best Businesses Boost Profits and Productivity by Cutting Greenhouse Gas Emissions.

=== U.S. Department of Energy ===
Romm served as Acting Assistant Secretary of the U.S. Department of Energy, in charge of the Office of Energy Efficiency and Renewable Energy in 1997, as Principal Deputy Assistant Secretary for the rest of the period from August 1995 through June 1998, and as Special Assistant for Policy and Planning from 1993 to July 1995. Romm's projects there included supervising a 1997 comprehensive technical analysis of energy technologies to reduce greenhouse gas emissions cost-effectively, titled Scenarios of U.S. Carbon Reductions.

=== 1998 to 2006 ===
Romm was, for several years, the executive director and founder of the non-profit Center for Energy and Climate Solutions, which developed strategies for saving energy and cutting pollution and greenhouse gas emissions. He was also a principal of the Capital E Group, which consulted on technology assessment and sustainable design services for clean energy technologies.

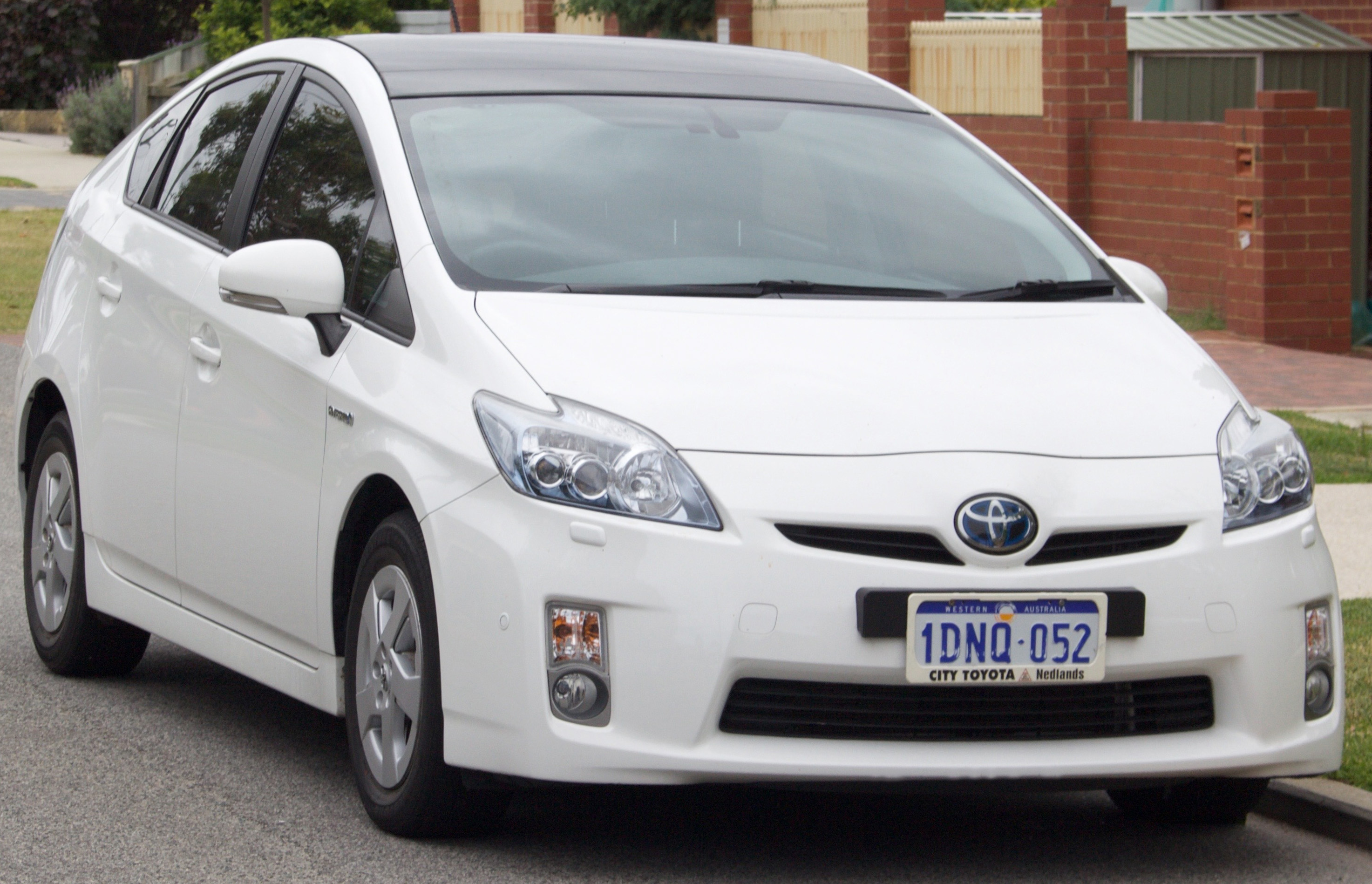
Romm wrote that hybrid cars like the Toyota Prius, BEVs and PEVs, are more effective in reducing greenhouse gases than hydrogen cars.

During these years, Romm wrote widely on global warming and energy technology solutions. His 2004 book, The Hype about Hydrogen (expanded and updated in 2025), argues that delaying the implementation of current green technologies in favor of waiting for technological breakthroughs in hydrogen cars is a dangerous distraction from reducing greenhouse gas emissions. The book was named one of the best science and technology books of 2004 by Library Journal. In reviewing the book, Daniel I. Sperling, then a member of California Air Resources Board, offered dissenting views. Also in 2004, Romm wrote the National Commission on Energy Policy's report, "The Car and Fuel of the Future", which was rated the #1 Hottest Article on Energy Policy by ScienceDirect. He was also the principal investigator for the National Science Foundation project, Future Directions for Hydrogen Energy Research and Education (2004). Romm is interviewed in the 2006 documentary film Who Killed the Electric Car?, in which he argues that the government's "hydrogen car initiative" was a bad policy choice and a distraction that delayed the exploitation of more promising technologies, such as electric and hybrid cars that reduce greenhouse gas emissions and increase America's energy security.

Romm's 2006 book Hell and High Water projected a limited window of opportunity to head off the most catastrophic effects of global warming by using emission-cutting technologies. Tyler Hamilton, in his review of the book for The Toronto Star, wrote: "Romm's book presents overwhelming and disturbing evidence that human-caused greenhouse gases are the primary ingredients behind global warming [and] alarming detail on how the U.S. public is being misled by a federal government (backed by conservative political forces) that is intent on inaction, and that's also on a mission to derail international efforts to curb emissions." Technology Review wrote that Hell and High Water "provides an accurate summary of what is known about global warming and climate change, a sensible agenda for technology and policy, and a primer on how political disinformation has undermined climate science."

=== Climate Progress and later years ===
In 2006, Romm became a senior fellow at the Center for American Progress, where he founded their climate blog, Climate Progress, which focused on climate science, policy and reporting. In 2008, Time magazine named his blog one of the "Top 15 Green Websites", writing that it "counters bad science and inane rhetoric with original analysis delivered sharply. ... Romm occupies the intersection of climate science, economics and policy. ... On his blog and in his December 2006 book, Hell and High Water, you can find some of the most cogent, memorable, and deployable arguments for immediate and overwhelming action to confront global warming." In 2010, Time magazine wrote, "Viewing climate change through the prism of national security, Romm analyzes breaking energy news and the relevant research ... he challenges the beliefs and conclusions of the mainstream media on climate-change issues." Romm contributed to the site until 2019. He also wrote for other energy and news sites, including The Huffington Post, Grist, Slate, CNN, Salon.com and The New York Times.

Romm testified before congressional committees about how government action can curb global warming. In 2007, he testified before the House Committee on Science and Technology on the subject of "Fuels for the Future", specifically the use of liquid fuel from coal and its potential to accelerate global warming. He lectured on energy technology, global warming and how the media portrays climate change.

TreeHugger describes Romm's 2010 book, Straight Up, as "a whirlwind tour through the state of climate change, the media that so badly neglects it, the politicians who attempt to address it (and those who obstruct their efforts and ignore [the] science), and the clean energy solutions that could help get us out of the mess". His 2012 book, Language Intelligence, concerns persuasion and the effective use of rhetoric, presenting "Solutions the reader can use for speeches, social media, or just winning the debate around the kitchen table." Romm's August 2012 article for Time used the research from Language Intelligence to analyze whether Mitt Romney or Barack Obama was the more effective communicator. Romm encouraged scientists to use the principles of effective communication outlined in the book (instead of their accustomed, technical, neutral style) to better explain the dangers of, and solutions to, climate change to non-scientists and the media.

Romm was the chief science editor for the documentary TV series Years of Living Dangerously, about the impact of and solutions to climate change. The first season of the series in 2014 on the Showtime network won the 2014 Emmy Award for Outstanding Documentary or Nonfiction Series. Romm wrote "Climate Change 101: An Introduction", for the series's website. A second season ran in 2016 on the National Geographic Channel. In 2015, The Weather Channel included Romm as one of "the world's 25 most compelling voices" on climate. That year, Romm also wrote the book Climate Change: What Everyone Needs to Know, a primer on the topic. Ralph Benko in Forbes magazine wrote that the "book ... lucidly presents the case both for deep concern and optimism". In New York magazine, David Wallace-Wells cited the book as an "authoritative primer", and in 2026, Clay Risen, in The New York Times, referred to it as "the standard primer for would-be climate-policy debaters". Romm's 2018 book, How to Go Viral and Reach Millions, "teaches everything from word choice to how to recast your scientific stories in ways that connect with people emotionally".

In June 2019, Romm founded a progressive news aggregator, Front Page Live, together with Carl Cameron, Laura Dawn, Sunny Hundal, Helen Stickler and others. Romm was its first editor-in-chief. In 2023, he became a senior research fellow at the University of Pennsylvania's Penn Center for Science, Sustainability and the Media. He received a 2024 Ban Ki-moon Award for Environmental Leadership. Romm hosted a weekly podcast from 2025 to 2026, together with his daughter, called Decoding Taylor Swift: A Storytelling Revolution, analyzing Swift's storytelling techniques and the use of poetic rhetoric in her lyrics to communicate and persuade. It ranked as high as number two in the music category on Apple Podcasts. The same year, he was lead author on the study "Are Carbon Offsets Fixable?" The study found that 90% of carbon credits fail to achieve real-world carbon reduction, and the credits' "intractable problems have persisted despite more than two decades of efforts at market reform and seem unlikely to be resolved"; it suggests that because they create a false sense of progress, they serve to delay policy action to reduce emissions.

=== Personal life and death ===
After 1993, Romm lived in Washington, D.C. From 1994 through 2007, he was a regular contributor to The Style Invitational, a weekly humor contest run by The Washington Post. Among his submissions was the winning entry of what was later declared to be the best overall week's results of the Style Invitational's first decade. He was divorced and had one daughter.

Romm died by suicide in Washington, on September 14, 2026, at the age of 66.

== Media comment ==
Romm was cited in The Economist on clean investments, The New York Times on the political use of climate policy, and the futility of hydrogen for transportation and MSNBC on natural gas hydrates. In 2009, he was featured on 60 Minutes discussing the scientific evidence that "clean coal" is not clean. In 2010, MSNBC's Countdown with Keith Olbermann program interviewed Romm on how the military is taking action on climate change to improve national security; Guernica Magazine interviewed him on the science and politics of global warming; The New Yorker asked him to comment on the Koch-funded exhibit on evolution and climate change at the National Museum of Natural History; and The Atlantic and CBS News each reviewed a media call by Romm concerning the relationship between the January 2010 snowstorms in Washington, D.C., and global warming.

In 2011, The Washington Post included a link to Romm's review of the scientific literature on climate change. Time magazine explored Romm's critique of Matthew Nisbet and praised his analysis of the decline of media coverage regarding climate change. National Geographic quoted him about the part that the media has played in the dearth of information about climate reaching the public. The same year, Technology Review cited Romm regarding the relationship between government-assisted deployment and rapid innovation in energy technologies, and the Toronto Star referenced him regarding President Obama's 2011 State of the Union address. In 2012 in The New York Times, economist Paul Krugman cited Romm on the connection between drought and climate change, and The Atlantic interviewed and cited him on the reluctance of the Democrats to discuss climate change. National Geographic quoted him about disappearing arctic ice and the effect of climate change on the polar bear, and Current TV's Bill Press interviewed Romm about record-breaking heat.

In 2014 Businessweek quoted Romm regarding the lack of commercial viability of hydrogen fuel cells for cars, and The Guardian cited him concerning international cooperation on climate change and, in 2015, about historic high global temperatures, and MarketWatch quoted him on actions that Donald Trump might take concerning climate agreements if he were to be elected president. Later that year, Bulletin of the Atomic Scientists interviewed Romm about nuclear power and climate change. The Wall Street Journal quoted him in 2016 about the cost and pace of change in clean energy technology. In 2017, Mother Jones listed Romm's reading recommendations for "understanding in this age of rancor". The same year, Huffington Post said that Romm's 2017 appearance on Sam Harris's podcast "over the course of two hours unpacks the scientific case for climate change like only Romm can."

In 2018, Tucker Carlson interviewed Romm on Fox News about the threat of global warming. Later that year, Romm was cited by Alaska Public Media regarding Lisa Murkowski's record on climate change and in The Guardian about President Trump and the Clean Power Plan. Friedman cited Romm in The New York Times in 2019 regarding the proposed Green New Deal. GQ Britain quoted Romm in 2020 criticizing carbon offsets. William S. Becker, writing in The Hill, cited Romm's 2023 white paper on carbon offsets. In 2023, Peter Coy, in The New York Times, referenced Romm concerning carbon markets and carbon capture. In 2025 Michael Barnard wrote in CleanTechnica: "Romm ... one of the clearest-eyed analysts of carbon policy and energy technologies ... dismantles the case for BECCS with forensic clarity. ... He shows how BECCS not only diverts policy and funding away from real decarbonization, but also opens up dangerous land-use pressures that displace food, ecosystems, and people." The same year, Romm was quoted in Chemical & Engineering News discussing green hydrogen.

== Political views ==
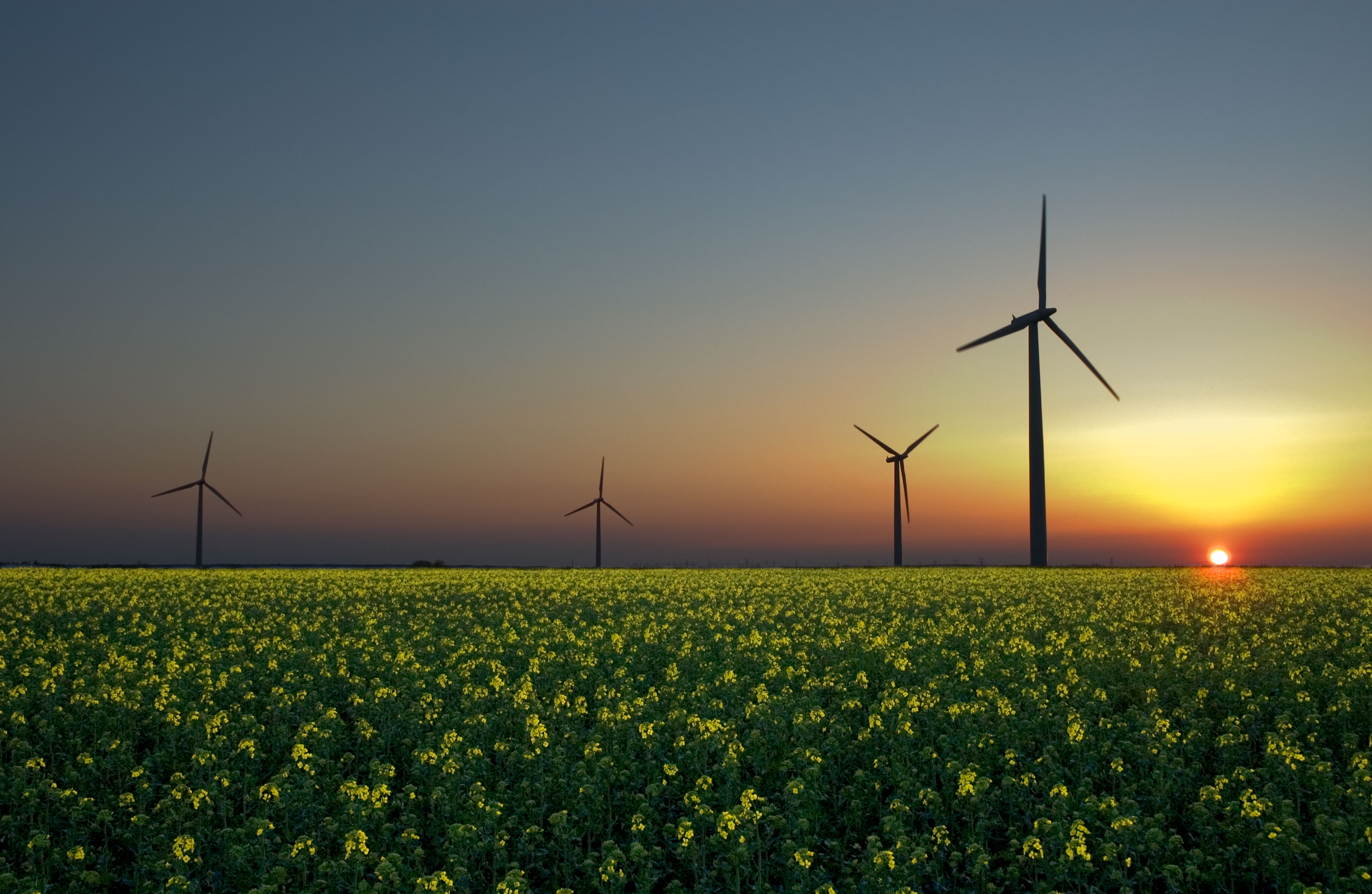
Romm argued that rapid deployment of current carbon-reducing technologies is essential to mitigate the worst effects of global warming and preserve both the world economy and a comfortable climate.

The New York Times "Dot Earth" column reviewed Romm's views on global warming solutions in 2008, including his belief that, to combat global warming, humans cannot wait for new technologies and scientific breakthroughs; that instead we must "deploy existing and near-term low-carbon technologies as fast as is humanly possible". The New York Times also quoted Romm as stating that, to solve the climate crisis, "We will need a WWII-style approach." The article noted Romm's belief that "credible people" and the press should publicly support the notion that government action is needed to help solve the global warming crisis. In particular, the press should explain how current news stories, such as hurricanes, droughts and insect infestations are related to global warming.

According to U.S. News & World Report, Romm believed that global warming "is advancing more swiftly than most people think and than the mainstream media usually report. He has called for significantly ramping up government spending on clean energy technology, halting the construction of new coal plants, rapidly increasing the use of energy-efficient technologies, and imposing a cap and trade system to sharply limit carbon dioxide emissions." In 2006, in a radio interview, Romm stated, "Global warming is going to transform this country and our transportation and the way we live our lives. If we don't act pretty soon, in an intelligent fashion, then change will be forced upon us by the radically changed climate ... global warming is the issue of the century."

In 2011, Romm wrote that "Feeding some 9 billion people by mid-century in the face of a rapidly worsening climate may well be the greatest challenge the human race has ever faced." Romm's 2010 book, Straight Up argues: "the bottom line is that the economic cost of action is low, whereas the cost of inaction is incalculably greater." Romm calculated that deployment of existing technologies on the massive scale that can save the climate can be accomplished at the cost of 0.12 percent of global GDP per year. He also asks in the book, "will the United States be a global leader in creating jobs and exports in clean energy technologies, or will we be importing them from Europe, Japan, and the likely clean energy leader in our absence, China." In 2005, with respect to the U.S. Congress's actions on climate, including its votes on the XL Pipeline, Romm told The Guardian: "Future generations suffering from the consequences of our inaction will be bewildered that the legislative body of the richest country in the world could devote so little effort to ameliorating the climate problem and so much effort to making it worse." He believed that carbon capture and storage and other carbon removal efforts are not scalable solutions, and "'net zero' is just a dangerous myth" used to excuse inaction on the climate crisis. In 2025, Romm wrote that small modular reactors are a "pipe dream" and the most expensive form of electricity generation, while wind, solar and batteries have become the cheapest.

Romm was critical of media coverage of global warming. In his 2010 book, Straight Up, he wrote that newspapers have most often repeated the views "of U.S. scientists ... receiving funds from the fossil fuel industry [instead] of the world's leading climate scientists. No surprise that much of the public has ended up with a misimpression about the remarkable strength of our scientific understanding and the need for action" and "more and more pieces are being written by senior political reporters, who know very little about global warming." Romm also believed that scientists and politicians need to be more effective communicators about climate change.

== Reception ==
Clay Risen wrote in The New York Times: "Politicians in government and experts in the field quickly took notice of Mr. Romm's clear, detailed policy takes – and takedowns. ... [M]any credited [Romm with] shaping climate policy during the presidencies of Barack Obama and Joseph R. Biden Jr." Risen also called Romm a "compelling speaker". In 2008, Romm was elected a fellow of the American Association for the Advancement of Science for "distinguished service toward a sustainable energy future and for persuasive discourse on why citizens, corporations, and governments should adopt sustainable technologies". In 2009, Rolling Stone magazine named Romm to its list of "100 People Who Are Changing America", quoting journalist David Roberts as follows: "Joe combines two qualities you don't often find together. A deep knowledge of technology, policy and science along with genuine moral passion." Former Houston, Texas, mayor Bill White called Romm "the nation’s leading expert on energy efficiency". U.S. News & World Report featured Romm as one of eight "key players" who were "Driving Public Policy in Washington", calling Romm an "oft-cited expert on climate change issues, and a go-to witness at congressional hearings". Time magazine named Romm one of its "Heroes of the Environment (2009)", writing, "He combines ... intellect with a strong sense of moral outrage. He also possesses a Jon Stewart-like quality for pointing out the absurdity of his opponents." Time named his blog as one of the "Top 15 Green Websites" in 2009. The same year, Thomas L. Friedman, in The New York Times, called Climate Progress "the indispensable blog".

In 2010, Time included Romm's blog in a list of the 25 "Best Blogs of 2010" and one of the "Top Five Blogs TIME Writers Read Daily". The same year, TreeHugger named Romm's blog the "Best Politics Website", adding, "this is the art of blogging at its best." The UK's The Guardian ranked Climate Progress at the top of its list of blogs in its "Top 50 Twitter climate accounts to follow". Reviewing Romm's 2010 book Straight Up, Bill McKibben wrote that Romm "has been a persuasive voice [warning that] global warming ... is a far worse problem than either politicians or the general public understand [but] that we have much of the technology necessary to at least begin tackling the problem". He called Romm "a tireless foil to the 'right-wing disinformation machine' that has [delayed] action by confusing and disheartening Americans about global warming. ... It requires a thick skin to take on the daily task of dealing with the disinformers [and] talent as well." In 2011, The New York Times called Romm "one of the country’s most influential writers on climate change". In 2012, Planetsave wrote that Romm is "considered the world's best blogger on climate science, and politics related to it". Michael Mann said of Romm, "There’s nobody else who brought all of these interlocking talents and proclivities together in the way that he did. That gave him such a unique voice, and it’s a voice that we sorely could use today."

== Bibliography ==
In addition to his books and other publications listed below, Romm wrote or co-wrote numerous articles and lectured widely on global warming effects and solutions, clean technologies, business and environment issues and distributed energy. His articles have been published in Nature, U.S. News & World Report, Technology Review, Issues in Science and Technology, Forbes, Foreign Affairs, The New York Times, the Los Angeles Times, The Guardian, The Washington Post, Science, Scientific American, Physics Today, Physics World, The Economist, Time, Grist magazine, Businessweek and Mother Earth News, among other publications.

In 2006, Romm and Prof. Andrew A. Frank co-authored "Hybrid Vehicles Gain Traction", published in Scientific American, in which they argue in favor of Plug-in hybrid electric vehicles. The same year, Romm published "California's Hydrogen Highway Reconsidered" in Golden Gate University Law Review. In 2007, he co-authored "Plugging into the Grid: How Plug-In Hybrid-Electric Vehicles Can Help Break America's Oil Addiction and Slow Global Warming" in the Progressive Policy Institute's Policy Report. Romm contributed a chapter to the 2007 book Energy and American Society: Thirteen Myths, disputing that "The Hydrogen Economy Is a Panacea." In 2008, Nature published Romm's article "Cleaning up on Carbon", in which he advocated "accelerating the deployment of the 11 wedges ... originally modelled by Socolow and Pacala". In 2011, Nature published Romm's article "The Next Dust Bowl", exploring the dangers to the world economy and populations by droughts caused by climate change, such as food insecurity.

From 2023 to 2026, Romm released several white papers for the Penn Center for Science, Sustainability, and the Media in an effort to combat climate misinformation: "Are carbon offsets unscalable, unjust, and unfixable – and a threat to the Paris Climate Agreement?", "Why direct air carbon capture and storage (DACCS) is not scalable, and 'net zero' is just a dangerous myth", "Why scaling bioenergy and bioenergy with carbon capture and storage (BECCS) is impractical and would speed up global warming", "Smaller nuclear reactors (SMRs) are a costly dead end, especially for AI" and "New York’s $100 Billion Nuclear Anti-Affordability Fiasco: Why the State’s Deeply Flawed Energy Plan Would Explode Electricity Rates".

=== Books ===
- Romm, Joseph (1992). The Once and Future Superpower: How to Restore America's Economic, Energy, and Environmental Security. New York: William Morrow. ISBN 978-0-688-11868-6.
- Romm, Joseph (1993). Defining National Security: The Nonmilitary Aspects. Washington: Council on Foreign Relations. ISBN 978-0-87609-135-7.
- Romm, Joseph (1994). Lean and Clean Management: How to Boost Profits and Productivity by Reducing Pollution. New York: Kodansha Amer Inc. ISBN 978-1-56836-037-9.
- Romm, Joseph (1999). Cool Companies: How the Best Businesses Boost Profits and Productivity by Cutting Greenhouse Gas Emissions. New York: Island Press. ISBN 978-1-55963-709-1.
- Romm, Joseph (2004). The Hype about Hydrogen, Fact and Fiction in the Race to Save the Climate. New York: Island Press. ISBN 978-1-55963-703-9. An updated edition was published in 2005 (ISBN 1-55963-704-8). The book was also translated into German as Der Wasserstoff-boom.
- Romm, Joseph (2006). Hell and High Water: Global Warming—the Solution and the Politics—and What We Should Do. New York: William Morrow. ISBN 978-0-06117-212-0.
- Romm, Joseph (2010). Straight Up: America's Fiercest Climate Blogger Takes on the Status Quo Media, Politicians, and Clean Energy Solutions. New York: Island Press. ISBN 9781597267168.
- Romm, Joseph (2012). Language Intelligence: Lessons on Persuasion from Jesus, Shakespeare, Lincoln, and Lady Gaga. CreateSpace. ISBN 978-1477452226.
- Romm, Joseph (2015). Climate Change: What Everyone Needs to Know. Oxford University Press. ISBN 978-0190250171. (Chapter 7, available online)
- Romm, Joseph (2018). How to Go Viral and Reach Millions. Luminare Press. ISBN 978-1944733773.
- Romm, Joseph (2025). The Hype about Hydrogen, Revised Edition. New York: Island Press. ISBN 978-1-64283-402-4.

=== Selected journal articles and reports ===
- "Greening the Building and the Bottom Line: Increasing Productivity Through Energy-Efficient Design" (with Browning), Rocky Mountain Institute (November 1994; peer-reviewed by U.S. Green Building Council); first published as Proceedings of 1994 ACEEE Summer Study, Pacific Grove, CA
- "Policies to Reduce Heat Islands" (with Rosenfeld, Akbari, Pomerantz and Haider G. Taha), 1996 ACEEE Summer Study on Energy Efficiency in Buildings, Pacific Grove, California. Vol. 9, p. 177
- "Cool Communities: Strategies for Heat Island Mitigation and Smog Reduction" (with Rosenfeld, Hashem Akbari and Melvin Pomerantz), Energy and Buildings 28 (1998) pp. 51–62
- "Engineering-Economic Studies of Energy Technologies to Reduce Greenhouse Gas Emissions: Opportunities and Challenges" (with Brown, Levine, Rosenfeld and Koomey), Annual Review of Energy and the Environment (1998)
- "A Roadmap for U.S. Carbon Reductions" (with Levine, Brown, and Petersen), Science (January 30, 1998), vol. 279, no. 5351, pp. 669–70
- "Combined Heat and Power for Saving Energy and Carbon in Buildings" (with Kaarsberg, Koomey, Rosenfeld and Teagen), Proceedings of 1998 ACEEE Summer Study, Pacific Grove, California (1999)
- Report: "The Internet Economy and Global Warming" (with Arthur H. Rosenfeld and Susan Herrmann), Center for Energy and Climate Solutions, The Global Environment and Technology Foundation (1999–2000)
- "The internet and the new energy economy", Resources, Conservation and Recycling, p. 36 (2002) pp. 197–210
- "Future Directions for Hydrogen Energy Research and Education" (Principal Investigator), Report to the National Science Foundation (November 2004)
- "The Car and Fuel of the Future", Energy Policy, 34 (2006), pp. 2609–14
- Report: "The Self-Limiting Future of Nuclear Power", Center for American Progress (2008)
- Romm, Joseph, Stephen Lezak and Amna Alshamsi. "Are Carbon Offsets Fixable?", Annual Review of Environment and Resources, vol. 50, pp. 649–680 (October 2025)
