= Hell and High Water (book) =

2006 book by Joseph J. Romm

- Author: Joseph J. Romm
- Language: English
- Publisher: HarperCollins
- Publication date: 2006
- ISBN: 0-06-117212-X
- OCLC: 77537768
- Dewey Decimal: 363.73874 22
- LC Class: QC981.8.G56 R66 2007
- Preceded by: The Hype about Hydrogen
- Followed by: Straight Up

Hell and High Water: Global Warming – the Solution and the Politics – and What We Should Do is a book by author, scientist, and former U.S. Department of Energy official Joseph J. Romm, published December 26, 2006. The author is "one of the world's leading experts on clean energy, advanced vehicles, energy security, and greenhouse gas mitigation."

The book warned of dire consequences to the U.S. and the world if wide-scale environmental changes are not enacted by the U.S. government. It reviewed the evidence that the initial global warming changes would lead to feedbacks and accelerated warming. According to Romm, the oceans, soils, Arctic permafrost, and rainforests could become sources of greenhouse gas emissions. The book claimed that, without serious government action, sea levels would rise high enough to submerge numerous coastal communities and inland areas on both U.S. coasts and around the world by the year 2100.

In 2008, Time magazine wrote that "On [Romm's] blog and in his most recent book, Hell and High Water, you can find some of the most cogent, memorable, and deployable arguments for immediate and overwhelming action to confront global warming." Romm was interviewed on Fox News on January 31, 2007, about the book and the IPCC Fourth Assessment Report climate report.

== Summary of the book ==
Part I, comprising the first four chapters of the book, reviews the science of climate change, setting forth the evidence that humans are causing an unprecedented increase in carbon emissions that is, in turn causing global warming. The book describes the consequences of unchecked climate change, such as destruction of coastal cities due to rising sea levels and mega-hurricanes; increasing droughts and deadly water shortages; infestation of insects into new ranges; and increased famines, heat waves, forest fires and desertification. The book sets forth the research on "feedback loops" that would contribute to accelerating climate change, including:

- melting ice at the poles that means less reflection of sunlight by white ice and more absorption of the sun's heat by ocean water and dark land;
- an increasing amount of water vapor in the atmosphere (water vapor is a greenhouse gas);
- melting permafrost in the Arctic, where more carbon is locked in Arctic permafrost than in all of the Earth's atmosphere and where methane, which is about 20 times more powerful than carbon dioxide (CO_{2}) as a greenhouse gas, is being released by permafrost in the Arctic faster than scientists previously thought it would;
- the death of algae and phytoplankton from heat and acidity in the oceans, reducing the CO_{2} being absorbed by them; and
- the reduced ability of tropical forests to absorb CO_{2} as they are destroyed.

Romm proposes an eight-point program, based on existing technologies, to counter and then reverse the trend toward catastrophic global warming: performance-based efficiency programs; energy efficiency gains from industry and power generation through cogeneration of heat and power; building wind farms; capturing carbon dioxide from proposed coal plants; building nuclear plants; greatly improving the fuel economy of our vehicles using PHEVs; increasing production of high-yield energy crops; and stopping tropical deforestation while planting more trees.(pp. 22–23)

Part I then offers extrapolations, based on various models and analyses, of what will happen to the U.S. and the world by 2025, 2050 and 2100 if decisive action is not taken quickly. Treehugger.com called this "an explanation that is both comprehensive and comprehensible." The book claimed that without serious government action within the following ten years, sea levels will eventually rise high enough to submerge numerous coastal communities and inland areas on both U.S. coasts and around the world causing over 100 million "environmental refugees" to flee the coasts by the year 2100.

Part II, comprising the next six chapters, discusses the politics and media issues that the author says are delaying such decisive action (and how this has a negative influence on the behavior of other countries, particularly China) and also discusses the currently available technological solutions to global warming. The book asserts that there has been a disingenuous, concerted and effective campaign to convince Americans that the science is not proven, or that global warming is the result of natural cycles, and that there needs to be more research. The book claims that, to delay action, industry and government spokesmen suggest falsely that "technology breakthroughs" will eventually save us with hydrogen cars and other fixes. It asserts that the reason for this denial and delay is that "ideology trumps rationality. ... Most conservatives cannot abide the solution to global warming – strong government regulations and a government-led effort to accelerate clean-energy technologies into the market."(p. 107) Romm says that the media have acted as enablers of this program of denial in the misguided belief that the pursuit of "balance" is superior to the pursuit of truth - even in science journalism. The book describes how this has led to skewed public opinion and to congress cutting funds for programmes aimed at accelerating the deployment into the American market of cost-effective technologies already available.

The book spends many pages refuting the "hydrogen myth" (see also Romm's previous book, The Hype about Hydrogen) and "the geo-engineering fantasy". In Chapter 7, the book describes technology strategies that it claims would permit the U.S., over the next two decades, to cut its carbon dioxide emissions by two-thirds without increasing the energy costs of either consumers or businesses. These include launching "a massive performance-based efficiency program for homes, commercial buildings and new construction ... [and] a massive effort to boost the efficiency of heavy industry and expand the use of cogeneration ... [c]apture the CO_{2} from 800 new large coal plants and store it underground, [b]uild 1 million large wind turbines ... [and] [b]uild 700 new large nuclear power plants".

The book's conclusion calls on voters to demand immediate action. The conclusion is followed by over 50 pages of extensive endnotes and an index.

Tyler Hamilton, in his review of the book for The Toronto Star, summarizes the book's contents as follows: "Whereas the first third of Romm's book presents overwhelming and disturbing evidence that human-caused greenhouse gases are the primary ingredients behind global warming, the pages that follow offer alarming detail on how the U.S. public is being misled by a federal government (backed by conservative political forces) that is intent on inaction, and that's also on a mission to derail international efforts to curb emissions."

In his book Hell and High Water, Romm discusses the urgency to act and the sad fact that America is refusing to do so. ... Romm gives a name to those such as ExxonMobil who deny that global warming is occurring and are working to persuade others of this money-making myth: they are the Denyers and Delayers. They are better rhetoriticians than scientists are. .. Global warming is happening now, and Romm... gives us 10 years to change the way we live before it’s too late to use existing technology to save the world. "...humanity already possesses the fundamental scientific, technical, and industrial know-how to solve the carbon and climate problem for the next half-century. The tragedy, then, as historians of the future will most certainly recount, is that we ruined their world not because we lacked the knowledge or the technology to save it but simply because we chose not to make the effort”(Romm, 25).

== Challenges and solutions identified by the book ==
The book claims that U.S. politicians who deny the science and have failed to take genuine action on conservation and alternative energy initiatives are following a disastrous course by delaying serious changes that he says are imminently needed. Romm also criticizes the media for what he says is sloppy reporting and an unwillingness to probe behind political rhetoric, which he says are lulling Americans into accepting continuing delays on implementing emission-cutting technologies. The book argues that there is a limited window of opportunity to head off the most catastrophic effects of global warming, and it calls upon Americans to demand that our government "embrace an aggressive multi-decade, government-led effort to use existing and near-term clean energy technologies." (p. 230)

Romm writes that strategies to combat climate change with current technologies can significantly slow global warming and buy more time for the world to develop new technologies and take even stronger action. The book lays out a number of proposed solutions to avoiding a climate catastrophe, including:

- launching massive energy efficiency programs for homes, office buildings, and heavy industry;
- increasing the fuel efficiency of cars and light trucks to 60 miles per gallon while also equipping them with advanced plug-in hybrid technology;
- building 1 million large wind turbines; and
- ceasing tropical deforestation and reversing the trend by planting trees.

The book states, "The IPCC's Fourth Assessment Report this year (2007) will present a much stronger consensus and a much clearer and darker picture of our likely future than the Third Assessment – but it will almost certainly still underestimate the likely impacts. The Fifth Assessment, due around 2013, should include many of the omitted feedbacks, like that of the [carbon emissions caused by] defrosting tundra, and validate the scenarios described on these pages." (p. 94)

== Critical response ==
The Toronto Star's January 1, 2007 review of the book says that Romm "convincingly shoots down the arguments of those who claim global warming is a hoax or some kind of natural cycle not associated with human activities." The review laments that the "'Denyers and Delayers' are winning the political battle in the United States, the world's highest emitter of greenhouse gases and a saboteur of Kyoto talks" and that the media's policy of "giving 'equal time' to Denyers gives the public the wrong impression about our understanding and level of certainty around global warming science." The review concludes, "The book itself is a short and easy read, not as intimidating as some other works, and it hits all the main points on the science and politics behind global warming, and the policy and technological solutions to minimize damage to the planet, economy and humanity."

A review in the Detroit Free Press's Freep.com stated, "Joseph Romm's Hell and High Water is a great book for people who want to understand the complexities of global warming and, perhaps more important, what we could be doing about it other than wringing our hands or sticking our collective head in the sand." Technology Review concluded, "His book provides an accurate summary of what is known about global warming and climate change, a sensible agenda for technology and policy, and a primer on how political disinformation has undermined climate science." BooksPath Reviews commented, Hell and High Water is nothing less than a wake-up call to the country. It is a searing critique of American environmental and energy policy and a passionate call to action by a writer with a unique command of the science and politics of climate change. Hell and High Water goes beyond ideological rhetoric to offer pragmatic solutions to avert the threat of global warming – solutions that must be taken seriously by every American. On February 21, 2007, Bill Moore at EV World.com wrote: "...it seemed every paragraph, every page revealed some new outrage that just got my dander up. If it doesn't do the same to you, I'll really be surprised."

Grist's blog "Gristmill" noted, "Joseph Romm's Hell and High Water may be the most depressing book on global warming I've ever read. ... My hope is that a lifetime spent in insider elite politics causes him to underestimate what a bottom-up grassroots movement can accomplish. ... A coalition that supported real action on global warming, as part of movement that supported real solutions on these other issues too, would have a much better chance of winning than a single-issue group. It would have a broader base and could offer more immediate relief from problems; because global warming wouldn't be its only or even main issue, it would produce quicker results in the lives of ordinary people. ... Technically, Romm is sound." The writer amended his statement as follows: "I referred to the book as 'depressing', but the tone is frank, not truly gloomy.... Romm... is known as a level-headed, optimistic analyst. His book is no exception – he documents the problem and the (quite mainstream) solutions he endorses thoroughly and meticulously." The Foreign Policy in Focus article "An Inconvenient Truth II" cites the book with approval and references its analysis twice.

The blog "Political Cortex" wrote: "Hell and High Water might be the Global Warming work of most interest to the politically engaged (Democratic and/or Republican). Romm lays a strong case as to how Global Warming could be the death sentence for the Republican Party as reality becomes ever blatantly at odds with Republican Party rhetoric. ... Romm also highlights how, in an ever more difficult world in the years to come, either the United States figures out how to lead in dealing with mitigating/muting Global Warming and its impacts or risks becoming a pariah nation, with dire implications for the Republic and its citizens." Booklist's reviewer wrote that the book "presents a clear and effective primer on climate science. But the most salient aspects of this provocative expose involve Romm's documentation of what he calls the Bush administration's irresponsible and backward energy policies, the censorship of legitimate and urgent information pertaining to global warming, and the threats rising temperatures pose to "the health and well-being of this nation and the world. Romm explains that we already possess the technologies and know-how we need to reduce greenhouse gas emissions."

In 2008, the Greenpeace staff blog noted, "If you’re concerned about global warming and want to do something about it, Joseph Romm’s Hell and High Water ...is a fantastic primer. ... Romm clearly and concisely details the technologies and policies we need to adopt to avoid the worst consequences of global warming".

== See also ==
- Individual and political action on climate change
- Climate change response
- Effects of global warming
- Mitigation of global warming
- Politics of global warming
- Economics of global warming
- Attribution of recent climate change
- Kyoto Protocol
- Who Killed the Electric Car?
- Plug-in hybrid electric vehicle
- The Hype about Hydrogen
- List of environmental books
- Merchants of Doubt
- Straight Up
