= Meeky Rosie =

- Origin: Devon
- Genres: Indie / Experimental / Alternative
- Years active: 1998–present
- Members: Paul Knight-Malciak (vocals, guitar, arrangements and fx); Stephen Clayton (vocals, guitar, violin); Tim Brain (bass); Paul Oxenham (drums, percussion); Ben Morgan (vocals, keys, flute and fx)
- Website: www.meekyrosie.com

Meeky Rosie was a band based in Devon, South West England, UK.

The members became friends while studying at the University of Plymouth and were signed to independent record company 'Wandering Star Records' in 2001. The band spent many years writing and recording material. They also toured extensively around the UK. In 2006 they finished recording their debut album on the banks of the River Dart in Devon.

== Music career ==
The band worked with producer Max Heyes, who produced their debut album, which was never officially released. They also had tracks mixed by Alan Moulder and Tchad Blake.

Meeky Rosie had their singles played on BBC Radio 1 and BBC Radio 6.

They also achieved recognition for their contribution to the U.S. documentary film Who Killed the Electric Car?, as their song "Forever" was used as the documentary's main track.

After recording their debut album and completing the mixing, their record label was not prepared to invest any more money to release and promote the album. Meeky Rosie disbanded in April 2006.

Guitarist Paul Knight-Malciak continues to work in the music industry as a freelance producer and arranger.

Singer and guitarist Stephen Clayton now releases music under the name Stephen G. Clayton.

== Discography ==
- 2003 - Sunday School Sessions
- 2005 - Forever
- 2006 - Nobody Gets Away EP
