= Edward H. Murphy =

Edward H. Murphy is a former senior executive and board member of the American Petroleum Institute.

== Education ==
Edward Murphy obtained his BA in economics from Fordham University and his PhD from Rutgers University.

== Career ==
Edward Murphy has been employed at the American Petroleum Institute in a variety of positions, beginning in 1975, and he retired from the institute as group director for industry operations and downstream in 2007. He has been outspoken in defense of the petroleum industry and appeared in the 2006 film, Who Killed the Electric Car as an interviewee, in which he stated: "I differ strongly with that. We did not kill the electric car. The petroleum industry did not kill the electric car, what killed the electric car was antiquated technology. It's a good example of something we should not repeat, it's something we need to avoid."

== Publications ==
- Murphy, Edward (1976). Petroleum Industry Investment and the National Economy. American Petroleum Institute.
- Murphy, Dr. Edward H. and Canes, Dr. Michael E. (April 2, 2009). Economics of a National Low Carbon Fuel Standard. George C. Marshall Institute.
- Murphy, Dr. Edward H. and Canes, Dr. Michael E. (April 16, 2009). Assessing Low Carbon Fuel Standards: Implications of New Congressional and State Efforts to Cap Carbon in Gasoline. George C. Marshall Institute.
