= Chelsea Sexton =

Automotive professional focused on electric vehicles

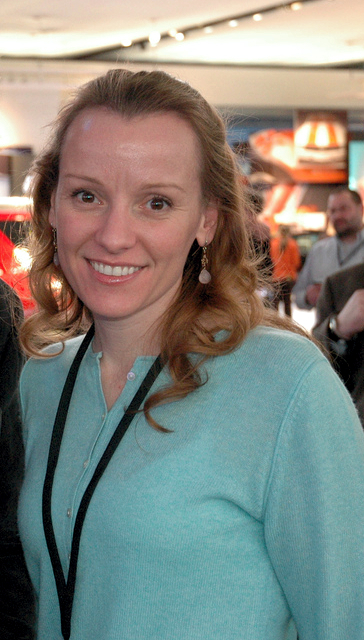
- Sexton in 2007
- Born: August 14, 1975 (age 51); California, U.S.
- Known for: Who Killed the Electric Car?
- Spouse: Bob Sexton
- Children: (1) Christopher
- Website: Official Blog

Chelsea Sexton (born August 14, 1975) is an electric car advocate and advisor. She frequently writes articles and blog posts about electric cars and her views on obtaining mass adoption of the technology by the car industry and drivers.

Sexton was interviewed in the documentary Who Killed the Electric Car?

In 2021, Sexton joined the United States Department of Energy’s Loan Programs Office to help deploy federal loans and loan guarantees for sustainable transportation solutions.

== EV1 ==
Sexton entered the automotive industry at the age of 17 after buying her first Saturn. She wanted to put herself through college by working at Saturn, but she ended up finding that she loved the cars more than what she was studying, so when General Motors announced the EV1 electric vehicle program three years later, she jumped on it. Focusing on building a market for alternate-fuel vehicles through partnerships with corporate and non-profit stakeholders, shaping public policy and incentives, developing marketing strategies, and working directly with the drivers themselves, Sexton became well known as an advocate for clean, efficient transportation.

== Advocacy ==
Sexton was laid off from General Motors at the end of 2001, after the company stopped manufacturing its EV1 electric automobile. Sexton became a consultant to auto manufacturers and clean-energy providers, helping to bring alternative-fuel vehicles to market, and promoting increasingly "clean" (i.e., air pollution-free) ways to power them. In 2005, Sexton joined the X PRIZE Foundation, leading the creation of a prize effort for both energy technologies and automobiles. In 2006, Sexton managed an alternative-fuel division for Santa Monica, California based start-up, Zag.com (later renamed TrueCar.com); she also served as co-founder, and executive director (until the early-2010s), of Plug In America (a coalition of individuals and organizations advocating the preservation and increased production of plug-in electric vehicles and plug-in hybrids [PHEVs]).

In 2008, Sexton founded the Lightning Rod Foundation, an advocacy organization.

Sexton is one of the key experts featured in the 2006 documentary film Who Killed the Electric Car?, and was a consulting producer on its 2011 follow-up, Revenge of the Electric Car. Sexton is a frequent guest on the Transport Evolved podcast, and has also appeared on many others (e.g., What Drives Us, and The Geekcast).

In 2011, Sexton published a review of the Yokohama HER-02 EV sports concept car, for Wired magazine.

On October 8, 2013, Sexton was announced as one of (a network of) thirteen bloggers on the website of Popular Science. Her Rotorhead blog focuses on the "green" rebirth of the automobile and other forms of transportation, alike.

Since September 2019, Sexton has been a presenter on the (YouTube) show Fully Charged, covering stories in America as part of the (UK-based) channel's drive to use local reporters as much as possible, thus reducing 'journalism miles'.

== Private life ==
She lives in California with her husband Bob Sexton, a former EV1 service technician who was also employed by Tesla. They have one child.
