= Clay Risen =

American journalist

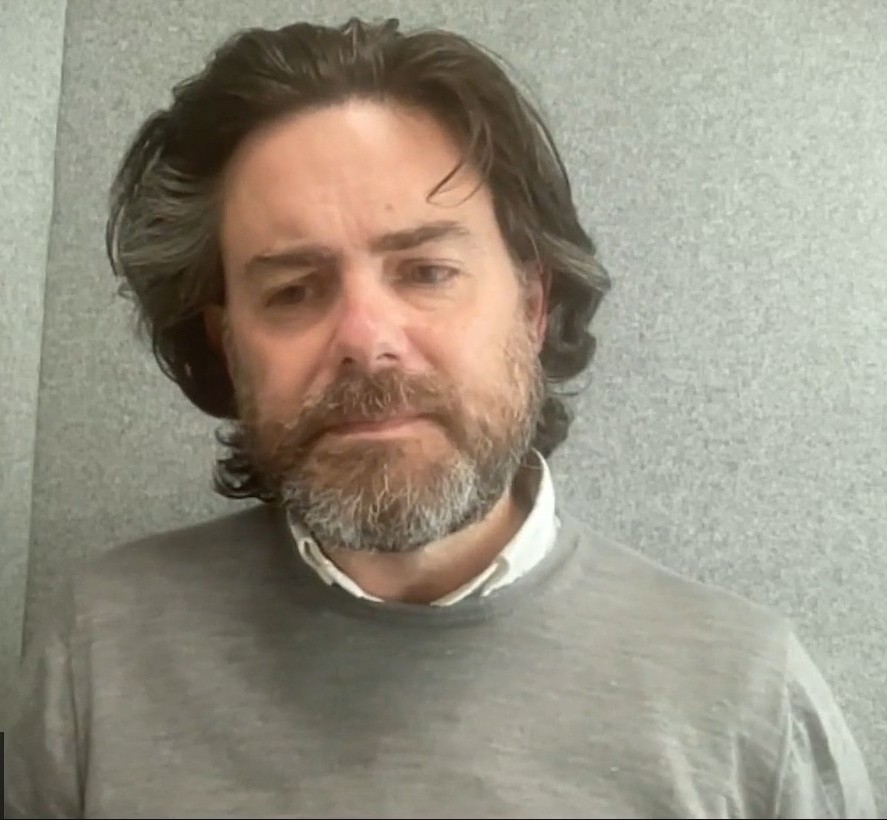
Risen in 2026

Clay Risen is an obituaries reporter at The New York Times and the author of books on American history and whiskey.

== Early life and education ==
Risen was born in upstate New York and grew up in Nashville.

Risen received a bachelor's degree from Georgetown University, where he attended the Walsh School of Foreign Service and was an editor of the student newspaper. He received a master's degree in social sciences from the University of Chicago.

== Career ==
He worked at The New Republic and elsewhere before moving to the New York Times.

== Books ==
- ——— (2009). A nation on fire: America in the wake of the King assassination. Hoboken, N.J: John Wiley & Sons. ISBN 978-0470177105.
- ——— (2015). The Bill of the Century: The Epic Battle for the Civil Rights Act. New York: Bloomsbury Publishing USA. ISBN 978-1608198269.
- ——— (2015). American whiskey, bourbon & rye: a guide to the nation's favorite spirit (Revised & expanded ed.). New York, NY: Sterling Epicure. ISBN 978-1454916888.
- ——— (2018). Single malt: a guide to the whiskies of Scotland. New York, NY: Quercus. ISBN 978-1681441078.
- ——— (2019). The crowded hour: Theodore Roosevelt, the Rough Riders, and the dawn of the American century. New York: Scribner. ISBN 978-1501144004.
- ———; Sharrett, Luke (2021). Bourbon: the story of Kentucky whiskey (First ed.). New York: Ten Speed Press. ISBN 978-1984858276.
- ——— (2022). American rye: a guide to the nation's original spirit. New York: Scott & Nix, Inc. ISBN 978-1935622758.
- Walker, Mason; ——— (2024). Bourbon Lore: Legends of American Whiskey. Scott & Nix, Inc. ISBN 978-1935622796.
- ——— (2025). Red Scare: blacklists, McCarthyism and the making of modern America. New York: Scribner. ISBN 978-1982141806.
