= The Hype About Hydrogen =

2004 book by Joseph J. Romm

- Author: Joseph J. Romm
- Language: English
- Publisher: Island Press
- Publication date: 2004; 2025
- ISBN: 1-55963-703-X
- OCLC: 53138756
- Dewey Decimal: 333.79/68 22
- LC Class: TP261.H9 .R65 2004
- Preceded by: Cool Companies (1999)
- Followed by: Hell and High Water

Cover of German version

The Hype About Hydrogen: Fact and Fiction in the Race to Save the Climate is a book by Joseph J. Romm, published in 2004 by Island Press and updated in 2025. The book has been translated into German as Der Wasserstoff-Boom. Romm is an expert on clean energy, advanced vehicles, energy security, and greenhouse gas mitigation.

Over 200 publications, including Scientific American, Forbes magazine and The New York Times, have cited this book. The book was named one of the best science and technology books of 2004 by Library Journal.

The thrust of the book is that hydrogen is not economically feasible to use for transportation, nor will its use reduce global warming, because of the greenhouse gases generated during production and transportation of hydrogen, the low energy content per volume and weight of the container, the cost of the fuel cells, and the cost of the infrastructure for refueling. The author argues that a major effort to introduce hydrogen cars before 2030 would actually undermine efforts to reduce emissions of heat-trapping greenhouse gases such as carbon dioxide.

In April 2025, Romm released a greatly expanded and updated version of the book, The Hype About Hydrogen, Revised Edition: False Promises and Real Solutions in the Race to Save the Climate.

== Description of the book ==
The Hype about Hydrogen contends that global warming and U.S. reliance on foreign fuel imports cannot be solved by the hypothetical hydrogen economy that has been advanced as a possible solution to these problems, and that "neither government policy nor business investment should be based on the belief that hydrogen cars will have meaningful commercial success in the near or medium term."

The book explains how fuel cells work and compares different types. It then reviews the difficulties in marketing fuel cells for applications other than transportation and argues that these are in fact easier and more likely to happen sooner than transportation applications.

The history of hydrogen and its methods of production are then described. The book discusses steam methane reforming, the most common and cost-effective method of hydrogen production, which involves reacting natural gas with water and emits large amounts of CO_{2} (a greenhouse gas). As of 2019, 98% of hydrogen was produced either by this method or by methods with even greater greenhouse emissions (like coal gassification), which Romm attributes to the inefficiency of alternative methods such as electrolysis. The monetary costs of hydrogen fueling infrastructure for the U.S. are then estimated at half a trillion U.S. dollars, and the book describes additional energy and environment costs to liquefy and compress hydrogen for use in fueling stations.

The book goes on to discuss the hypothetical evolution of the cost of vehicles with fuel cells and with hydrogen-powered internal combustion engines, as well as possible adoption strategies. It then reviews the issue of the greenhouse effect and offers four reasons why hydrogen would not be useful in reducing greenhouse gas emissions:

- Internal combustion engines continue to improve in efficiency.
- Since hydrogen is likely to be made from combustion of fossil fuels, it produces CO_{2} and other greenhouse gases as part of the fuel cycle.
- Fuel cells are likely to be much more expensive than competing technologies.
- Fuels used to make hydrogen could achieve larger reductions in greenhouse gas emissions if used to replace the least efficient of the electric power plants.

The book then describes pilot projects in Iceland and California.

In its conclusion, the book states that hydrogen will not be widely available as a transportation fuel for a long time, and describes other strategies, including renewables, energy storage and energy conservation techniques, to combat global warming.

=== Revised and expanded 2025 edition ===
The 2025 edition is greatly revised and sets forth the facts known as of the date publication about the drawbacks of hydrogen, from its inefficiency as an energy carrier and high cost of production, to the continued lack of infrastructure development, the difficulty and expense of storage, handling and transport of the "pernicious" element, and the likelihood of increased global warming directly and indirectly from hydrogen leaks and production emissions. It considers why only a tiny percentage of production of the element yields "green" hydrogen and why carbon capture and storage is not practicable at scale for capturing the emissions caused by the production of hydrogen. It also treats the limitations on the useful applications of hydrogen, including for transport and for heating in buildings and industry. Most of the book is devoted to discussing what Romm says are the most heavily promoted diversions being touted by the fossil fuel industry to delay and resist real climate solutions that can be deployed now to save the climate: fusion power, "green" hydrogen, hydrogen made from nuclear power (particularly small modular reactors), "dirty" blue hydrogen, e-fuels, and direct air capture. The book also discusses why EVs are a "winning" technology, far superior to hydrogen vehicles, and what other solutions are available today, as the cost of renewables and batteries plummet, to save the climate.

== Critical reception ==
The Hype about Hydrogen was named one of the best science and technology books of 2004 by Library Journal. The New York Review of Books stated that the book gives "the most direct answers" to the question on the promise of a near-term hydrogen economy, calling Romm "a hydrogen realist". The environmental community newsletter TerraGreen cited the book's good reception by Toyota's advanced technologies group. The San Diego Union-Tribune's 2004 review commented that Romm's "clear logic" reached conclusions similar to an authoritative study issued by the National Academy of Sciences.

Three UC Davis scientists who also reviewed the book agreed on its basic premises, but stated that Romm had made selective use of sources, for example, citing the highest cost estimates, adopting extremely high estimates of efficiency for advanced gasoline vehicles, and giving weight to controversial non-peer-reviewed studies.

A 2025 article in Chemical and Engineering News cited the revised edition's discussion of the limitations of green hydrogen.

== See also ==
- Hydrogen vehicle
- List of books about energy issues
- Plug-in hybrid electric vehicle
- Who Killed the Electric Car?
- Hell and High Water
