= Tyler Hamilton (reporter) =

Tyler Jay Hamilton (born June 6, 1970) is a Canadian author, cleantech expert and former business and technology reporter specializing in clean technology. He is currently Senior Director of Climate at MaRS Discovery District, and a former adjunct professor at York University's Faculty of Environmental Studies. Previously, Hamilton was Editor-in-Chief of Corporate Knights magazine, and Climate and Economy Reporter with the Toronto Star, Canada's largest daily-circulation newspaper.

== Biography ==
Born in Mississauga, Ontario, Hamilton has an Honours BA in political science and legal philosophy from the University of Toronto (1989–94), and a Masters of Journalism from Carleton University (1994–96). Between 1999 and 2001 he served as technology reporter at Canada's national newspaper, The Globe and Mail.

In July 2000 he joined the Toronto Star, where he wrote a weekly column called Clean Break until 2010.

Clean Break was also the name of his personal blog, which between 2005 and 2013 served as an extension to the column. Both focused on trends and developments in the clean technology and renewable energy markets. Hamilton's Clean Break blog has been recognized as one of the first in North America dedicated to "cleantech" coverage.

In 2010 he received the award for Excellence in Science and Technology Reporting from the Canadian Advanced Technology Alliance. The same year he was appointed adjunct professor in the faculty of environmental studies at Toronto's York University.

In October 2011, Hamilton joined clean capitalism magazine Corporate Knights as its editor-in-chief, and took on the role of associate publisher in January 2013 until July 2014. He left Corporate Knights in September 2015 to rejoin the Toronto Star as its Climate and Economy Reporter — part of a "philanthrojournalism" partnership between the Toronto Star and Tides Canada. Through Corporate Knights, Hamilton served as senior adviser to its Council for Clean Capitalism, which was founded in late 2012.

From summer 2012 to summer 2014, Hamilton was a director on the board of community co-op ZooShare Biogas Cooperative, which has since completed construction of an anaerobic digester facility at the Toronto Zoo that will be used to turn zoo animal manure into electricity for the Ontario grid.

In 2016 Hamilton was listed on Canada's Clean50 list, which recognizes 50 Canadian leaders in sustainability every year. He joined MaRS Discovery District in 2016, where he serves as Senior Director of Climate and co-led the design and launch of the Women In Cleantech Challenge, a national competition in Canada with a $1 million prize created as a partnership between MaRS and Natural Resources Canada. He currently leads Mission from MaRS, a pan-Canadian climate impact challenge that aims to accelerate the adoption of market-ready climate-tech solutions.

== Books ==
Mad Like Tesla: Underdog Inventors and Their Relentless Pursuit of Clean Energy, Tyler J. Hamilton, published in 2011 by ECW Press.

Privacy Payoff: How Successful Businesses Build Customer Trust, Ann Cavoukian, Tyler J. Hamilton & Don Tapscott, published in 2002 by McGraw-Hill.
