= Pakistan Nuclear Society =

- Nickname: PNS
- Formation: 1992
- Type: Scientific think tank
- Location: Islamabad, Pakistan
- Official language: English; Urdu
- President: Dr. Muhammad Tahir Khaleeq
- Vice President: Mr. Waqar Ahmad Butt
- General Secretary: Dr. Mohammad Mohsin
- Executive Members: Ms. Huma Qamar, Dr. Javed Iqbal Saggu, Mr. Muhammad Abbas Qamar, Ms. Nazia Kashif, Syed Zahid Husain
- Staff: 9
- Website: pns.org.pk

The Pakistan Nuclear Society (PNS) is an academic not-for-profit educational and scientific learned society devoted to the promotion of peaceful use of nuclear energy and the lobbying for commercial nuclear power development in the country. The PNS has approximately more than 1000 life members (scientists, engineers, physicians, doctors and educators). PNS is a member of International Nuclear Societies Council (INSC) and PNS also closely interacted with its associated international nuclear societies and organizations.

The PNS was established in 1992 by a group of senior scientists and engineers. The PNS provides an understanding of the peaceful application of atomic nucleus, nuclear science, technology and allied disciplines while lobbying for the nuclear power development for economical use. Its first Chairman was Munir Ahmad Khan who succeeded in organizing the society and helped register the society under the societies registration Act 1860, Constitution of Pakistan. The PNS is governed by nine officers elected by the members for a two-year term and its secretariat is housed at Islamabad.

The PNS publishes The News (Newsletter of Pakistan Nuclear Society (PNS)), and its annual meeting took place in the month of September each year. The PNS is governed through an executive council comprising the president, vice-president, general-secretary, finance-secretary and five executive members. The PNS interacts with following counterpart organizations:

- Chinese Nuclear Society
- American Nuclear Society
- European Nuclear Society
- Korean Nuclear Society
- Canadian Nuclear Society
- Nuclear Society of Thailand
- Hungarians Nuclear Society
- Atomic Energy Society of Japan
- Spanish Nuclear Society

== See also ==
- List of nuclear power groups
- World Nuclear Association
- World Nuclear University
