= Li Guanxing =

Chinese engineer (1940–2020)

- Born: January 14, 1940; Shanghai, China
- Died: December 1, 2020 (aged 80); Beijing, China
- Education: Tsinghua University
- Scientific career
- Fields: Nuclear material
- Workplaces: CNNC North Nuclear Fuel Element Co., Ltd.
- Academic advisors: Li Hengde

Chinese name
- Traditional Chinese: 李冠興
- Simplified Chinese: 李冠兴
Transcriptions
Standard Mandarin
- Hanyu Pinyin: Lǐ Guànxīng

Li Guanxing (Chinese: 李冠兴; 14 January 1940 – 1 December 2020) was a Chinese nuclear material engineer who served as president of the CNNC North Nuclear Fuel Element Co., Ltd. between 2001 and 2004. He was chairperson and party chief of Chinese Nuclear Society from 2008 to 2018. He was a delegate to the 16th National Congress of the Chinese Communist Party and a member of the 10th National Committee of the Chinese People's Political Consultative Conference.

== Biography ==
Li was born in Shanghai, on January 14, 1940. He entered Tsinghua University in January 1956, majoring in nuclear material at the Department of Engineering Physics, where he graduated in January 1962. Then he did his postgraduate work at the university.

In January 1967, he was dispatched to Metallurgical Research Institute of the CNNC North Nuclear Fuel Element Co., Ltd., one of the five largest state-owned entities in Baotou, Inner Mongolia. After the reform and opening up, in January 1982, he became a visiting scholar at the Ohio State University on government scholarships. He returned to China in January 1984 and that same year was promoted to become deputy director of the institute. He was chief engineer in December 1990, and held that office until December 2000. In January 2001 he was promoted to become its president, a position he held until April 2004. After retirement, he served as honorary general manager.

He died of illness in Beijing, on December 1, 2020, aged 80.

== Honors and awards ==
- 1999 Member of the Chinese Academy of Engineering (CAE)

Academic offices
Previous: Wang Naiyan (王乃彦)	Chairperson of Chinese Nuclear Society; 2008–2018	Next: Wang Shoujun (王寿君)
