= Uranium Council =

The Uranium Council is an entity created by the Australian Government in 2009. Chair Mark Chalmers has described it as "a combined Australian Government, Industry and Stakeholders committee (represented by BHP, ERA, Heathgate, Cameco and Paladin Energy) organized to review and remove impediments to Australia’s uranium exploration and development policy." It contains representatives from Commonwealth, State and Territory Governments, the uranium industry and the Northern Land Council.

== History ==
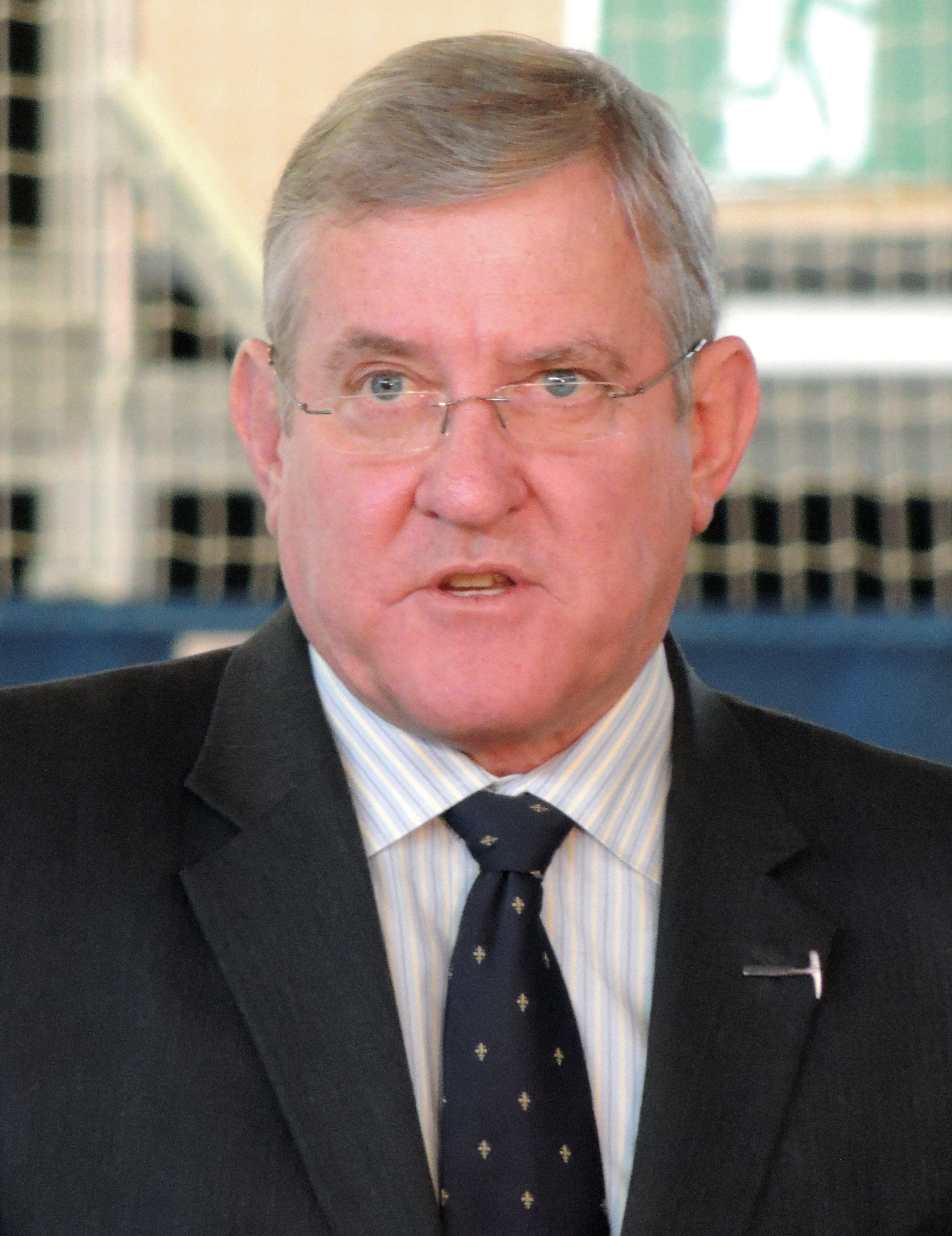
Ian Macfarlane

The Uranium Council was preceded by the Uranium Industry Framework Implementation Group (UIF), which was established during the Howard government in August 2005. Minister Ian Macfarlane formed the UIF in order to "advance the uranium industry in Australia at the highest possible standards." Its founding chairman was Dr John White FTSE, who was also a founding member of the Nuclear Fuel Leasing Group. The Government of South Australia was represented on the UIF by Paul Heithersay and the Minerals Council of Australia was represented by Mitchell Hooke. Ian Hore-Lacy from the Uranium Information Centre was also an original member of the UIF. The group's recommendations informed uranium mining and nuclear industrial development policy which was announced in April 2007.

In 2009 the Australian government undertook a review of its Uranium Industry Framework Implementation Group (UIF), and subsequently replaced it with the Uranium Council.

Mark Chalmers served as Chair of the Uranium Council and was previously a member of the UIF. In 2011, Chalmers described the Uranium Council as "a combined Australian Government, Industry and Stakeholders committee, organized to review and remove impediments to Australia’s uranium exploration and development policy."

== Vision and objectives ==
As of 2015, the Uranium Council's official vision is "to contribute to national well-being through the progressive and sustainable development of the Australian uranium exploration, mining, milling and exporting industry in line with world's best practice standards." Its objectives are:

- to change the basic legislative and policy framework for the "sustainable development of the industry"
- to facilitate the "economically competitive development of the industry"
- to improve coordination, consistency and efficacy of regulation and policy regimes
- to encourage "new and expanded investment in competitive uranium development opportunities"
- to provide an "opportunity for information and policy exchange on issues affecting the uranium industry"
