= Fiona Rayment =

British nuclear engineer

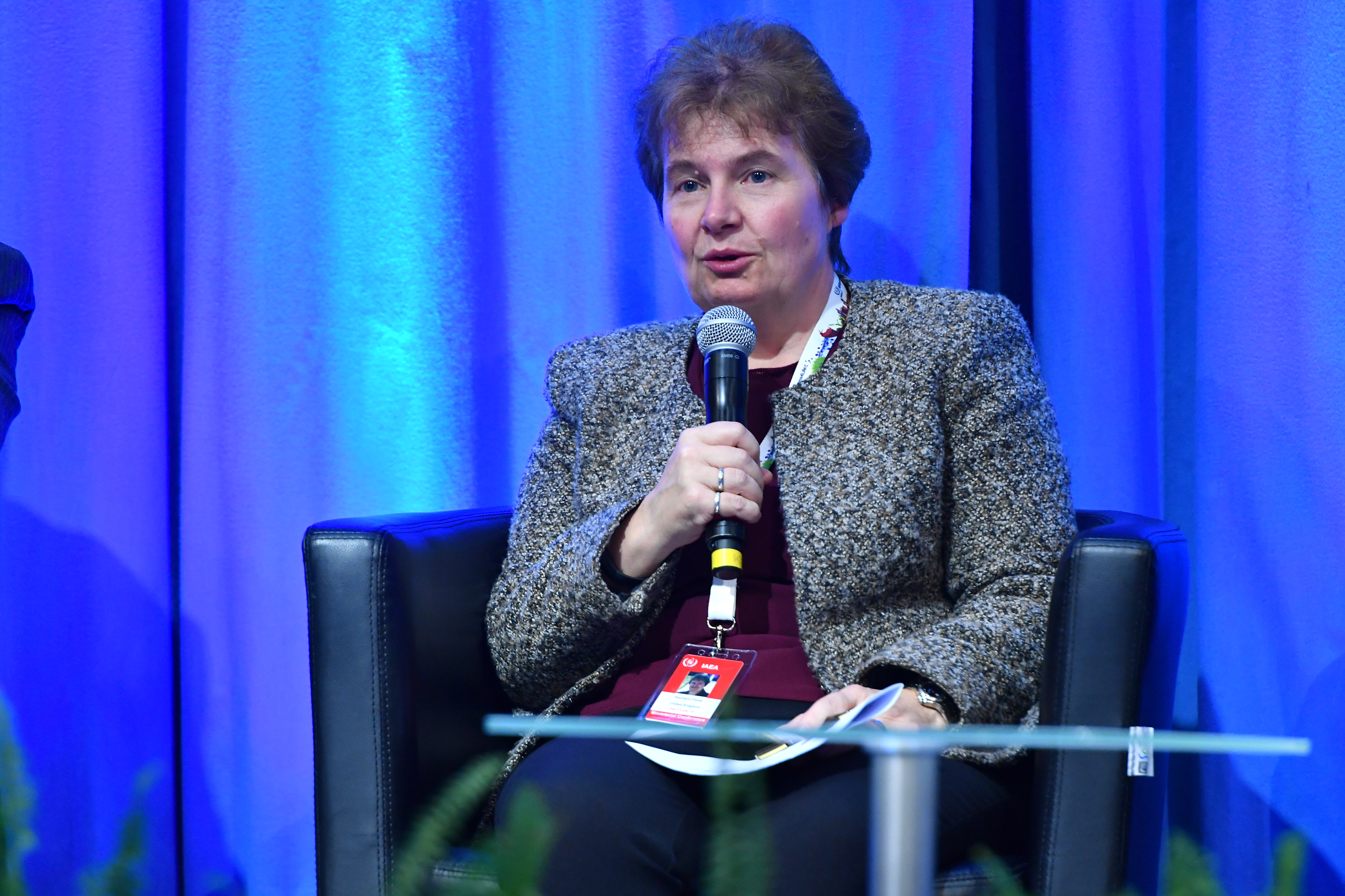
Rayment in 2018

Dame Fiona Elizabeth Rayment DBE FREng FRSE is a British nuclear engineer who retired in 2024.

== Early life and education ==
Rayment has an MBA from Manchester Business School and a PhD (1992) from the University of Strathclyde, where her thesis title was "Synthesis and reactions of boranes and carboranes for use in boron neutron capture therapy".

== Career ==
Before her retirement in 2024 she was employed by the National Nuclear Laboratory and its predecessors for 32 years, serving at its chief science and technology officer and later as special advisor to its CEO.

== Recognition ==
Rayment was appointed O.B.E. in the 2017 Birthday Honours "for services to UK Nuclear Research and Innovation", and was awarded the French Legion of Honour in 2020 in recognition of her work on Franco-British nuclear partnership. She was appointed D.B.E. in the 2026 New Year Honours "For services to Nuclear Engineering".

Rayment won the 2025 Sir Frank Whittle Medal, awarded by the Royal Academy of Engineering "to an engineer resident in the UK whose outstanding and sustained achievements have had a profound impact on their engineering discipline".

She is a fellow of the Nuclear Institute, the Royal Society of Chemistry, the Royal Society of Edinburgh, and the Royal Academy of Engineering, and in 2024-2025 was president of the Nuclear Institute. In 2024 she was elected a fellow of the American Nuclear Society. She was appointed as a patron of Women in Nuclear UK in 2022.

In April 2024 she was the subject of an episode of the BBC Radio 4 series The Life Scientific.
