= European Nuclear Society =

The European Nuclear Society (ENS) was founded in 1975 has grown to become the largest society in Europe for science, engineering and research in support of the nuclear industry. ENS's membership consists of national nuclear societies from 22 European countries. Within the membership there are also stakeholder representatives for nuclear technology and research businesses, including 31 corporate members.

ENS states that its main goal is to promote the advancement of peaceful uses of nuclear energy on an international level, encouraging networking between countries and facilitating meetings to support global communication on scientific and technical affairs. ENS also supports education and training in engineering, promotes international standardisation in the nuclear industry, coordinates the activities of the member organisations and develops the expertise and capability needed for the future of the industry.

One of ENS's activities is organising conferences and workshops, providing a platform for international forums to exchange knowledge, experience, ideas and scientific developments.

The current president of the European Nuclear Society is Dr Michèle Coeck, with Honorary President Prof. Frank Deconinck.

The ENS is a member of the International Nuclear Societies Council (INSC).

== ENS Young Generation Network (YGN) ==
The ENS Young Generation Network (YGN) has been active across the society's member countries since 1995 when ENS supported a proposal from Jan Runermark, the then President-elect of ENS, to spread the Young Generation Network (YGN) to all its member countries. Five objectives ensure that YGN members are working towards a common goal, these are:

- Attracting more young people: Recruiting and educating young people to be skilled members of the nuclear industry
- Training new leaders: Exchanging knowledge between generations
- Thinking nationally: Participation of young people in the national nuclear societies
- Thinking internationally: Bringing together all national YGNs at European level
- Opening up nuclear conferences: Ensuring events are relevant and topical for young people to attend.

YGN membership is available to anybody working in the nuclear industry, as well as fields of nuclear academia and research.

== European Nuclear Young Generation Forum (ENYGF) ==
The European Nuclear Young Generation Forum (ENYGF) is a biennial international event, held since 2005 by the Young Generation Network (YGN) as part of the European Nuclear Society. The forum alternates with the International Youth Nuclear Congress (IYNC) and is held in a different location in Europe each time.

The aim of the event is to provide a platform for learning and networking for young professionals in all areas of nuclear application. It provides a chance to enhance international communication as well as sharing technical advances and knowledge, learning from experience and discussing best practice as well as considering social and political aspects of the nuclear industry.

The forum involves:

- Formal lectures and presentations
- Workshops - which have previously included Women in Nuclear (WiN)
- Technical tours
- Keynote speakers
- Social and cultural events

Each forum has a number of central focuses, around which the speakers, lectures, presentations and workshops are based. In 2011, the forum in Prague focused on the topics of nuclear safety and severe accidents, education and training, new build projects and ITER and fusion. At the 2015 forum in Paris the main focus points were nuclear efficiency and nuclear and the environment.

== Previous ENYGF events ==
Following the success of IYNC conferences which began in the year 2000, the ENS-YGN decided to create the ENYGF 2005 and host the inaugural event in the city Zagreb, Croatia. Following this, the ENS-YGN elected cities to host the event every two years; the host locations to date have been:

- ENYGF 2005, Zagreb, Republic of Croatia
- ENYGF 2007, Amsterdam, Netherlands
- ENYGF 2009, Córdoba, Spain
- ENYGF 2011, Prague, Czech Republic
- ENYGF 2013, Stockholm, Sweden
- ENYGF 2015, Paris, France
- ENYGF 2017, Manchester, United Kingdom
- ENYGF 2019, Ghent, Belgium
- ENYGF 2021, Tarragona, Spain
- ENYGF 2023, Krakow, Poland
- ENYGF 2025, Zagreb, Croatia
- ENYGF 2027 is planned for Rome

The events are organized by an executive committee from the selected country. This executive committee can acquire assistance from delegates of other countries who chose to collaborate. All the committee members have a common goal which is to further the ENS-YGN mission and help to create a global community of nuclear professionals.

== See also ==
- American Nuclear Society
- European Atomic Forum
- Institute of Nuclear Materials Management
- Nuclear Institute
