= Ian Hore-Lacy =

Australian nuclear industry communicator (1940–2021)

- Born: 1940; Australia
- Died: December 2, 2021 (aged 80–81)
- Education: University of New England (BSc, Hons); University of Melbourne (MSc)
- Occupations: Nuclear industry communicator, author, advocate for nuclear power
- Years active: 1974–2017
- Employer(s): Uranium Information Centre; World Nuclear Association
- Known for: Advocacy for nuclear power in Australia; author of Nuclear Energy in the 21st Century
- Notable work: Nuclear Energy in the 21st Century; Responsible Dominion – a Christian Approach to Sustainable Development
- Title: General Manager, Uranium Information Centre (1995–2001); Director of Public Information and Senior Research Analyst, World Nuclear Association
- Board member of: Uranium Industry Framework (Howard government)

Ian Leslie Hore-Lacy (1940 – 2 December 2021) was an Australian nuclear industry communicator, author and advocate for nuclear power in Australia. He semi-retired as Senior Advisor with the World Nuclear Association, London.

== Career ==
He was a Senior Advisor at the London-based World Nuclear Association, where he was previously Director of Public Information and Senior Research Analyst for over 16 years. Hore-Lacy had a Bachelor of Science with honours from the University of New England and a Master of Science from University of Melbourne, both in biological sciences.

=== Rio Tinto group ===
His career in resources and energy began in 1974 when he was employed by CRA (now Rio Tinto Group) as an environmental scientist. He took a particular interest in uranium mining and nuclear energy during the Ranger inquiry in the 1970s. Hore-Lacy continued to work for CRA until 1993, ultimately working in Corporate Relations. Hore-Lacy was closely involved with the production of the TV documentary series Out of the Fiery Furnace which was completed for ABC television in Australia in 1985 and was supported by the Rio Tinto group (via CRA Services Ltd). The series traced the discovery and use of metals, minerals, and energy resources through time, and premiered in the US in 1986 and was shown in over twenty countries.

=== Nuclear industry ===
In 1995 Hore-Lacy assumed the role of General Manager of the Uranium Information Centre in Melbourne, a position he held until 2001 publishing information on nuclear power to support the UIC members, all uranium miners and explorers. He also served as the organisation's secretary. The Centre's website was established in the year of his appointment. From 2001 his role progressively transferred to the World Nuclear Association, an international trade association, based in London. He was successively Director for Public Communications and Senior Research Analyst before largely retiring in 2017 as Senior Advisor.

During the Howard government, Hore-Lacy was appointed to the Uranium Industry Framework, whose recommendations informed subsequent government policy announced in 2007. The announcements included plans to repeal prohibitions which prevented further nuclear industrial development in Australia under the EPBC Act.

== Bibliography ==
Hore-Lacy wrote, edited and co-authored several books; most recently Responsible Dominion – a Christian Approach to Sustainable Development (2006) and Nuclear Energy in the 21st Century (2018). The latter book has been republished ten times and the 10th edition had a Chinese version.

Title	Role	Publisher	Years published	ISBN
Nuclear Energy in the 21st Century	Co-author	World Nuclear University Press & Elsevier	2006, 2010, 2012, 2018	978-09931019-3-9
Responsible Dominion: A Christian Approach to Sustainable Development	Author	Regent College Publishing	2006, 2015 (kindle 2nd edn)	978-1573833424
NUCLEAR ELECTRICITY: An Australian Perspective	Co-author	Australian Mining Industry Council	several editions, became Nuclear Energy in 21st Century	978-0909276355
Creating Common Wealth: Aspects of Public Theology in Economics	Author	Albatross Books	1987	978-0867600247
Broken Hill to Mount Isa: Mining Odyssey of W.H. Curbould	Editor	Hyland House Publishing	1981	978-0908090426
Mining and the environment	Author	Australian Mining Industry Council	1976, 1978	978-0959839210

== Death and legacy ==
Ian Hore-Lacy was killed in an accident while on holiday on 2 December 2021. His legacy includes his many publications and his curated library of academic papers and educational materials held at the World Nuclear Association.
