= Nuclear Science and Engineering =

Scientific journal

- Discipline: Nuclear engineering; nuclear physics
- Language: English
- Edited by: Farzad Rahnema

Publication details
- History: 1956—present
- Publisher: Taylor & Francis; American Nuclear Society
- Frequency: Monthly
- Impact factor: 1.3 (2024)

Standard abbreviations
- ISO 4: Nucl. Sci. Eng.

Indexing
- CODEN: NSENAO
- ISSN: 0029-5639

Links
- Journal homepage; Online access; Online archive

Nuclear Technology is a peer-reviewed scientific journal published monthly by Taylor & Francis on behalf of American Nuclear Society. Established in 1956, it covers basic and applied research in all areas related to nuclear science and engineering, including but not limited to nuclear physics, nuclear reactor physics, radioactive waste management, radiochemistry and nuclear materials. Its current editor-in-chief is Farzad Rahnema (Georgia Tech).

== Abstracting and indexing ==
The journal is abstracted and indexed in:

- Current Contents/Engineering, Computing & Technology
- EBSCO databases
- Ei Compendex
- Inspec
- Science Citation Index Expanded
- Scopus

According to the Journal Citation Reports, the journal has a 2024 impact factor of 1.3.
