= INSC =

INSC may refer to:

- International Nathiagali Summer College on Physics
- International Nuclear Safety Center
- International Nuclear Societies Council
- inscuteable (INSC) protein, see NFIX
- National Security Council (Iraq)
