= Material unaccounted for =

Difference between physical inventory of nuclear material and book inventory

Material unaccounted for (MUF), in the context of nuclear material, refers to any discrepancy between a nuclear-weapons state's physical inventory of nuclear material, and the book inventory. The difference can be either a positive discrepancy (an apparent gain of material) or a negative discrepancy (an apparent loss of material). Nuclear accounting discrepancies are commonplace and inevitable due to the problem of accurately measuring nuclear materials. This problem of inaccurate measurement provides a potential loophole for diversion of nuclear materials for weapons production. In a large plant, even a tiny percentage of the annual through-put of nuclear material will suffice to build one or more nuclear weapons.

MUF is a term used within nuclear material monitoring, the organisational and physical tests used in the monitoring of fissile material and the detection of any impermissible removal. An associated term is limit of error for the material unaccounted for (LEMUF), meaning the associated statistical limits of error possible for the MUF. In a civilian context, MUF is also sometimes referred to as the inventory difference (ID).

A 2014 report by the United States Army War College's Strategic Studies Institute states that although the quantity of MUF globally is unknown, it is "significant." They add that "U.S. nuclear weapons MUF alone is pegged at nearly six tons—i.e., enough to fashion at least 800 low-tech, multi-kiloton bombs," with Russian MUF numbers assumed to be as large. "As for Chinese, Indian, Pakistani, Israeli, and North Korean MUF figures, though, we have only a general idea of what they might be […] The civilian production of nuclear weapons-usable plutonium in the United States, United Kingdom (UK), Japan, France, and India also is a worry. We know that specific accounting losses in the case of civilian plutonium reprocessing and fuel making in the UK and Japan have been significant—measured in scores of bombs worth. What they might be elsewhere, again, is unknown."

== Definition ==
The International Atomic Energy Agency define MUF as the "difference between the book inventory and the physical inventory. This definition may be with respect to either the element or isotope weight." A more exact definition is represented by the following equation:

MUF = I - 0 + B - E

where I designates inputs, 0 designates outputs (which are sometimes subdivided into product and waste streams), B refers to beginning inventory, and E to ending inventory. The three terms in (eq. 3.4.1), I, 0, and B, collectively represent the book inventory, while E represents the physical inventory. Note that the physical inventory for one accounting period becomes a part of the book inventory for the subsequent period.

The IAEA also notes that the "definition of MUF implicitly assumes that the material balance is based completely on measured data. The use of by-difference accounting results in a meaningless MUF. For example, if the contents of waste streams are calculated as the differences between the measured amounts entering a process step and those exiting the step, it is clear that the calculated MUF would be zero over that particular material balance area, i.e., it would be meaningless as a performance index."

== History ==
=== Cold War ===
==== United States ====
The Center for Public Integrity (CPI) reported that during the Cold War nuclear weapons production was so frantic that approximately six tons of nuclear material, enough to fuel "hundreds of nuclear explosives", has been declared as MUF by the government. They add that "most of it [is] presumed to have been trapped in factory pipes, filters, and machines, or improperly logged in paperwork." A Defense Nuclear Facilities Safety Board report highlights, “On at least one occasion, in trying to determine the cause of a MUF in excess of 40 kg in 1969, all of the vessels, sumps, and catchbasins were flushed and inspected: total plutonium yield was less than 10% of the MUF."

Charles D. Ferguson, former president of the Federation of American Scientists, writes that this "was due to an emphasis […] on fast production rather than accurate accounting." He adds that "Given the history of U.S. production of enriched uranium […] one has to realize that tens of thousands of tons of uranium hexafluoride gas were pumped through these plants to produce the approximately 750 metric tons of HEU for military purposes. It is not surprising then that a few metric tons are considered MUF." Ferguson's assessment of the whereabouts differs from that of the CPI's, stating "discharges of nuclear material in waste streams and the environment were most likely the major reasons why the MUF values were 2.4 metric tons for plutonium and 3.2 metric tons for HEU." Elmer B. Staats stated, in a 1978 report, "For the most part, MUF is attributed by DOE and NRC to such things as inaccurate measurements and difficult to measure material held up in pipes, filters and machines used in processing special nuclear material." The other main reason given was "clerical errors."

In 1974, Karen Silkwood, a lab technician at Kerr-McGee, revealed to the Atomic Energy Commission that among many others irregularities, 40 pounds of plutonium was missing from the company's inventory. In 1977, The New York Times reported that 8,000 pounds of HEU and plutonium was unaccounted for across nuclear plants in the U.S.

==== Soviet Union ====
Soviet figures are unknown, as, unlike Western producers of plutonium, Soviet Russia did not use the 'MUF' accounting system (or an equivalent) to track its physical inventory of nuclear materials. Instead, it simply relied on the physical security of its plants. However, as stated above, Russian figures are presumed to be as large as the United States counterpart.

=== Post-Cold War ===
Worries that weapons-grade nuclear material could perhaps leak onto the black market following the collapse of the Soviet Union at the end of 1991 grabbed headlines at the time. However, several reported deals involving the sale of nuclear material turned out to be hoaxes. Nonetheless, of the approximately 20 known seizures of nuclear weapons materials since the dissolution of the Soviet Union, all have been made in former Soviet states. Thomas Cochran, formerly of the Natural Resources Defense Council stated that "The Russian problem is by far the most serious. People have an incentive to make money. There is clear evidence that stuff is leaking out." The CPI also notes that "although roughly two dozen countries have enough nuclear explosives to make a bomb, Russia's materials have long been the chief Western concern." The main threat about a potential nuclear explosion on Western soil post-cold war, as perceived by the United States, "[has] always been centered around the risk that explosive materials — more than a bomb's mechanical workings — could fall into the wrong hands." In 2005, Porter Goss warned that "There is sufficient material unaccounted for so that it would be possible for those with know-how to construct a nuclear weapon."

The CPI also reports that the United States government has spent "$4 billion over the past 25 years to help [Russia] tighten control of the weapons-usable materials inside its vast nuclear complex." In the same report, a US intelligence official alleges that former Russian military and intelligence personnel have been suspects in Nuclear trafficking. However, Russia has dismissed allegations of a leakage of nuclear materials as a smear campaign. Under Vladimir Putin, who first came to power in 1999, Russia has slowly reduced its nuclear security cooperation with the United States, stating that it has no further need of financial or technical assistance from Washington. Michael McFaul states it became a "tertiary issue" under Putin. In his 2007 memoir, George Tenet stated that upon hearing Al-Qaeda were attempting to purchase Russian nuclear devices in 2003, a Department of Energy intelligence official was sent to Moscow seeking information about "reports we had received of missing material," but the Russian government refused to provide details.

In 2018, the CPI also reported that two United States Department of Energy nuclear specialists "drove to San Antonio to pick up nuclear material from a research lab and transport it to an Idaho lab." However, "before they were able to complete the mission, radioactive material that they brought with them to calibrate radiation detectors was stolen from their vehicle while they stayed at a hotel." Over a year later, the CPI found that the nuclear materials in question, plutonium and cesium, have not been located, "and are now among an unknown amount of military-grade nuclear materials that have gone missing over the years." The same report also found "gaps" in the amount of plutonium manufactured by weapons companies and the amount that the government can account for.

== Causes ==
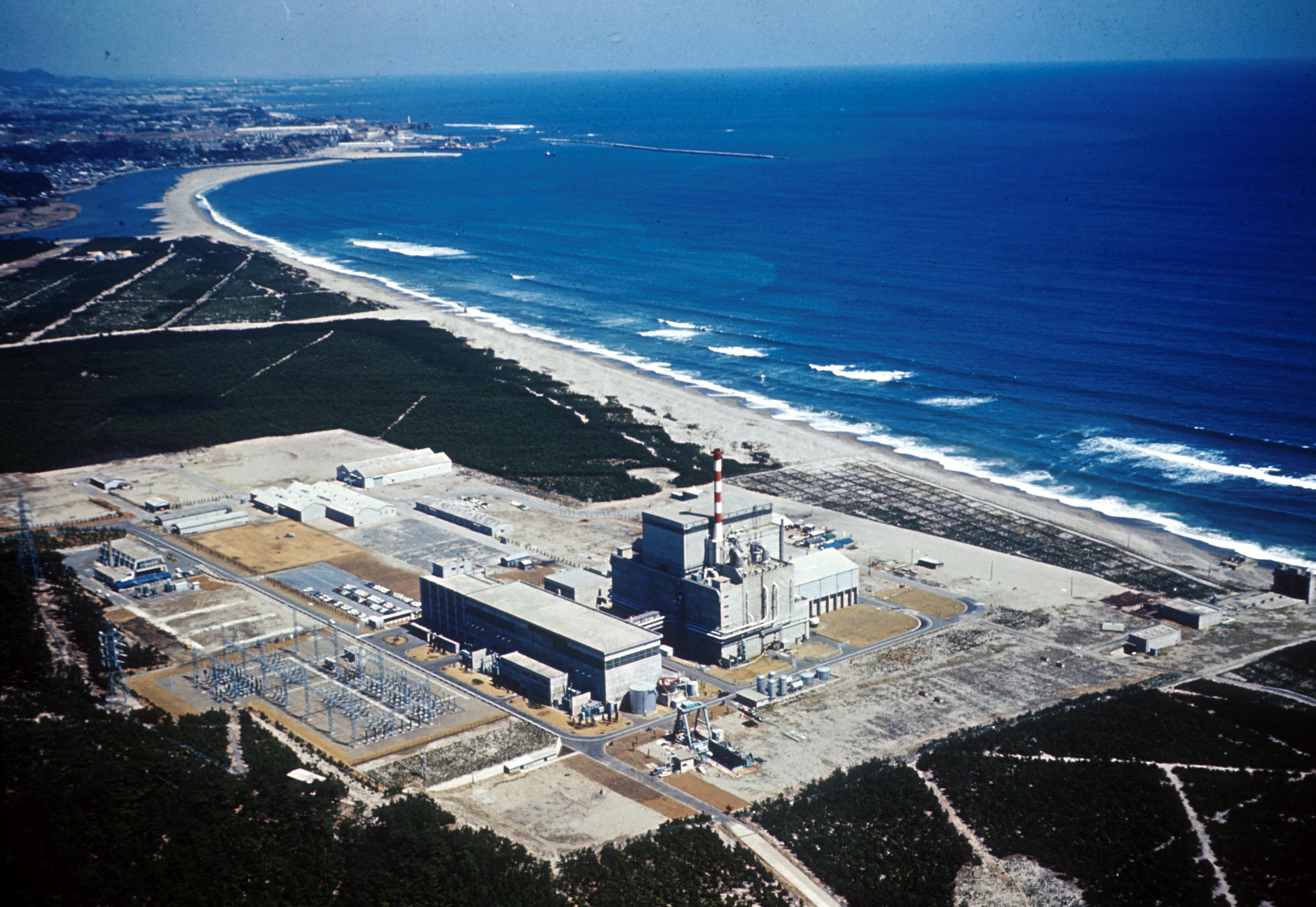
At the Tokai Nuclear Power Plant in Japan, the issue of residual holdup was problematic. In 1988, operators noticed plutonium becoming stuck in gloveboxes. This led to the development of a system that would allow measurement of the residual holdup without having to dismantle the hot cells. However, the system's imprecision contributed to an overall measurement uncertainty of roughly 15%. By 1994, due to a variety of factors, the plant's MUF had grown to about 69 kg of plutonium.

Charles D. Ferguson writes that the "biggest concern is statistically significant positive MUF values bigger than the LEMUF, because this could indicate diversion, loss, or theft. The inventory difference also has to reconcile losses of uranium and plutonium through radioactive decay and transmutations of an element to a different element in a nuclear reactor or accelerator. Other losses or consumptions of nuclear material occur in nuclear explosives or reactors via fission. The Department of Energy (DOE) has tried to take into account these natural and manmade losses and consumptions in its historical assessment of uranium and plutonium stockpiles."

As stated by the Office for Nuclear Regulation (ONR), however, the primary cause of MUF is uncertainties "inherent in measurement systems." They elaborate, "[a] finished product such as Plutonium Oxide, can be more accurately weighed and the uncertainty will be smaller." For materials that cannot be easily handled due to dangerous levels of radioactivity, or material in large quantities, "measurements may be more difficult and the associated uncertainties higher. Such measurement uncertainties are a major cause of [MUF] figures, and their existence does not mean that material has been found or lost." For example, according to a DOE report dated September 1996, "Most of the HEU in waste has been removed from the U.S. inventory as ‘normal operating losses’ because it is technically too difficult or uneconomical to recover." The ONR also note that "The magnitude of [the MUF] due to measurement uncertainty will depend strongly on the throughput of material at the plant concerned […] This is particularly the case in bulk processes such as reprocessing, where large volumes of material (hundreds of Tonnes per annum) pass through the plant, often in liquid solution form."

Residual holdup, which refers to the nuclear material remaining in and around the process equipment and handling areas after operation, is also a problem. The NRC write that "Uranium accumulates in cracks, pores, and zones of poor circulation within and around process equipment. The walls of process vessels and associated plumbing often become coated with uranium during processing of solutions. Uranium also accumulates in air filters and associated ductwork. The absolute amounts of uranium holdup must be small for efficient processing and proper hazards control. However, the total amount of uranium holdup may be significant in the context of the plant MUF."

The typical LEMUF by Western standards allows 3% of production to go missing. For example, in 2005, 29.6 kilograms of plutonium went unaccounted for at Sellafield in the United Kingdom. Although some, including Irish Green Party leader Trevor Sargent, expressed concerns it could fall into the hands of terrorists via the black market, Britain's Department of Trade and Industry (DTI) announced that it was an auditing mistake and involved no actual nuclear material. The Atomic Energy Authority said "The MUF figures for 2003/04 were all within international standards of expected measurement accuracies for closing a nuclear material balance at the type of facility concerned […] There is no evidence to suggest that any of the apparent losses reported were real losses of nuclear material."

== Prevention ==
Stringent monitoring of nuclear material stockpiles is common practice amongst the nuclear powers, and can help limit the potential for MUF. Most have some form of regulations in place to provide for this. As stated by the ONR, however, "Though procedures for nuclear materials accountancy are well developed they cannot be mathematically precise. The presence of positive inventory differences does not mean that material not in existence has somehow been found just as a negative figure does not imply a real loss of material." Accounting for materials in nuclear waste is a problematic task. Despite efforts to minimise the amount of plutonium or uranium that goes into waste, one cannot eliminate it entirely. MUF, therefore, presents an on-going challenge for nuclear facility operators and the term is instead one amongst a number used in the field of nuclear material monitoring.

To help prevent residual holdup, defined above, the NRC advises that "When the limit of error of uranium holdup is compatible with the plant LEMUF, the material balance can be computed using the measured contents of uranium holdup. Additional cleanout and recovery for accountability will then not be necessary." However, "when the limit of error of uranium holdup is not compatible with the plant LEMUF, the information obtained in the holdup survey can be used to locate principal uranium accumulations. Once located, substantial accumulations can be recovered, transforming the uranium to a more accurately measurable inventory component. Having reduced the amount of uranium holdup, the limit of error on the remeasurement of the remaining holdup may be sufficiently reduced to be compatible with overall plant LEMUF requirements."

Theft is still taken seriously. Security at nuclear facilities to detect and prevent any impermissible removal of nuclear material is high. The Strategic Studies Institute (SSI) notes that "Because of the layout and design of fuel cycle facilities, these MUFs can grow over time and may only be resolved by dismantlement and careful clean-out. Unless and until the source of the MUF can be identified, it is impossible to rule out the possibility of diversion or theft." The Federation of American Scientists comment that "As part of the inventory difference (ID) evaluation, other security events are reviewed to ensure that IDs are not linked to breaches of physical security or insider acts. If there is no evidence of security breaches, then IDs are less likely to be caused by malevolent acts, since integrated security and safeguards work to provide defense-in-depth."

Diversion of nuclear materials from civil nuclear power to the production of nuclear weapons by non-nuclear weapons states remains a cause of concern. Elaborating on the methods of detection used, the Arms Control Association write; "The IAEA typically is alerted to the diversion of declared nuclear material in a number of ways. It can detect the removal or alteration of objects containing nuclear materials that the IAEA has sealed or placed under video surveillance, or it can employ accountancy methods to detect shipper-receiver differences and material unaccounted for that exceed limits set by measurement uncertainties." However, the SSI also highlight that "Despite technological advances in monitoring and accounting systems since 1990, large MUFs have occurred repeatedly at facilities with IAEA-quality safeguards […] These failures have arisen both in non-nuclear weapons states, subject to IAEA safeguards, and in nuclear weapons states subject to analogous domestic regulations."

== International and domestic regulations ==
=== International ===
==== NPT ====
The Treaty on the Non-Proliferation of Nuclear Weapons (NPT) was signed in 1968 and became effective in 1970. It was signed by 191 parties, with the notable exceptions of India, Israel, North Korea and Pakistan. The signatories all agree to International Atomic Energy Agency (IAEA) Safeguards, which requires them to report to the IAEA all information on the amount of nuclear material held in their inventories, and by extension, to allow the IAEA to dispatch inspectors to confirm the authenticity of the report. Nuclear-weapons states, however, are not subject to IAEA safeguards and instead regulate their own respective nuclear industries.

==== CPPNM ====
The Convention on the Physical Protection of Nuclear Material (CPPNM) became effective in 1987. The United States Department of State write that "The CPPNM provides for certain levels of physical protection during international transport of nuclear material. It also establishes a general framework for cooperation among states in the protection, recovery, and return of stolen nuclear material. Further, the Convention lists certain serious offenses involving nuclear material which state parties are to make punishable and for which offenders shall be subject to a system of extradition or submission for prosecution." There are currently 157 signatories to the convention plus the European Atomic Energy Community.

=== Domestic ===
The following countries are either recognised nuclear-weapons states (US, UK, Russia, China, and France) or non-signatories to the NPT (North Korea, Israel, India, and Pakistan). As such they are regulated by their own domestic legislation and not subject to International Atomic Energy Agency (IAEA) safeguards. France, however, voluntarily chooses to be subject to IAEA safeguards, in conjunction with its own domestic authorities. Iran is also included, due to its unique circumstance pertaining to the Joint Comprehensive Plan of Action.

==== United States ====
The regulations laid out by the United States' Nuclear Regulatory Commission (NRC) require that each licensee maintain an official material control and accounting programme (known as MC&A) that tracks all special nuclear material (SNM) on site. All licensees are required to maintain accounts showing the receipt, inventory, acquisition, transfer, and disposal of all SNM in its possession regardless of its origin or method of acquisition. Physical inventories are inspected yearly. Within 60 days of taking the physical inventory, an SNM Physical Inventory Summary Report must be written, outlining any discrepancies between the physical and book inventory. If discrepancies are found, a further report is required to identify and resolve said discrepancies. This report must be sent within 30 days. Additionally, the Office of Nuclear Material Safety and Safeguards (NMSS), a branch of the NRC, is responsible for ensuring that security at nuclear facilities remains satisfactory, as well as providing security for the transport of nuclear material.

==== United Kingdom ====
Prior to 1 January 2021, the United Kingdom abided by the laws and regulations as outlined by the European Atomic Energy Community (Euratom). However, following the UK's withdrawal from Euratom, the Office for Nuclear Regulation (ONR) assumed its safeguards and nuclear material accountancy duties. The Nuclear Safeguards (EU Exit) Regulations 2019, which became British law in 2021— stipulate that for each nuclear material balance area, reports must be sent to the ONR showing: "(i)the beginning physical inventory; (ii)inventory changes (first increases, then decreases); (iii)ending book inventory; (iv)ending physical inventory; and (v)material unaccounted for". The regulations also demand that these reports be made "at the latest within the period of 15 days beginning with the day on which the physical inventory was taken." The physical inventory itself "must be taken every calendar year and the period between two successive physical inventory takings must not exceed 14 months." These regulations replaced existing Euratom law. Additionally, the levels of security at nuclear sites are very high. All sites are required to comply with a security plan approved by the Civil Nuclear Security Division of ONR and the measures taken exceed international recommendations in this area. Security itself is handled by the Civil Nuclear Constabulary.

==== Russia ====
Historically, Russia had no regulations in place pertaining to the monitoring of its nuclear material inventories. Damon Moglen, Director for the Climate and Energy Project stated in 2011 that "The Russians would not know even if there was anything missing." Instead, it simply relied on its physical security to prevent the loss of material. However, in 2012 new nuclear security regulations, known as the Federal Rules and Regulations Regarding the Use of Atomic Energy- NP-030-12 - "Basic Nuclear Material Control and Accounting Rules"— were adopted by the Federal Service for Environmental, Technological and Nuclear Supervision and made Russian Law. Shortly thereafter, a non-military overseer group was founded to ensure their implementation. Additionally, Russian officials have stated progress has been made in improving training for security guards, installing new barriers at nuclear facilities, and upgrading sensor technology.

A report by the University of Maryland School of Public Policy comments that "Specific improvements in the regulations that are worth noting, include: requiring that each site establish a designated MC&A (material control and accounting) organization; requiring that the book inventory be adjusted on the basis of a physical inventory taking; requiring the application of seals with unique identifiers to the most attractive categories of nuclear materials; and requiring the adoption of a two-person rule when accessing and working with nuclear material in certain situations." However, the same report emphasises that while the regulations do "establish the general requirement that statistical analysis be used at the completion of each physical inventory-taking […] it does not establish specific requirements, goals, or criteria. Several Russian facilities are developing relevant analytical methods, but it will take several years for these methods to be fully developed and tested, for personnel to be trained in using them, and for facilities to acquire the necessary technological capabilities to conduct them."

==== China ====
China has placed particular emphasis on nuclear security. The IAEA comment that the "Chinese government has been continuously strengthening and improving its nuclear security capacity. China has kept an excellent record on nuclear security during the past 60 years." Licensees in China are required to implement a strict physical inventory inspection procedure, with inventories required at least once per year. For nuclear materials such as plutonium-239 or uranium-233, inspections are required at least twice per year. For nuclear materials that are inaccessible or cannot be handled due to dangerous levels of radioactivity, inventory inspections rely on operational records and calculations. The National Nuclear Safety Administration is the government agency responsible for enforcing these regulations. China is believed to have been the first to implement a computer-based accounting system in 1996 to monitor its nuclear materials.

In addition, in 2016, China opened the State Nuclear Security Technology Centre (SNSTC), a state-of-the-art facility specialising in the use of technology to improve the security of nuclear material. Zhenhua Xu, the SNSTC's Deputy Director General stated that "Protecting nuclear or other radioactive material from falling into the hands of terrorists is of growing importance in a country like China, which is expanding its nuclear power programme." China cooperates actively with the IAEA to improve nuclear security, both domestically and globally. The Chinese government has recently asserted that "For more than 50 years, China has not lost a single gram or single piece of important nuclear material." Though Reuters contradict this claim.

==== France ====
Article 67 of the 1978 agreement between the IAEA and France stipulates that the "Material balance reports shall include the following entries unless otherwise agreed in the Subsidiary Arrangements: (a) Beginning physical inventory; (b) Inventory changes (first increases, then decreases); (c) Ending book inventory; (d) Shipper/receiver differences; (e) Adjusted ending book inventory; (f) Ending physical inventory; and (g) Material unaccounted for." Article 72 allows the IAEA to "verify information on the possible causes of material unaccounted for, shipper/receiver differences and uncertainties in the book inventory." For each inventory change, the date of the inventory change and the originating material balance area and the receiving material balance area or the recipient must be indicated. This agreement became French Law in 1981. The Autorité de sûreté nucléaire (ASN) is responsible for ensuring these regulations are implemented, as well as for overseeing security. The IAEA comment that "The nuclear security regime in France is robust and well-established, and incorporates the fundamental principles of the amended CPPNM."

==== North Korea ====
North Korea became a member of the IAEA in 1974 and ratified the NPT in 1985. In 1990, North Korea reported to the IAEA that after a "hot test" at a nuclear facility— the purpose being to ultimately extract 60 grams of plutonium— it lost almost 30% of the plutonium in waste streams. North Korea did not include the required safeguards agreement with the IAEA until an agreement was signed in 1992. Article 67 of the 1992 agreement stipulated that (verbatim with the 1978 French agreement) "Material balance reports shall include the following entries, unless otherwise agreed by the Democratic People's Republic of Korea and the Agency: (a) beginning physical inventory; (b) inventory changes (first increases, then decreases); (c) ending book inventory; (d) shipper/receiver differences; (e) adjusted ending book inventory; (f) ending physical inventory; and (g) material unaccounted for." Articles 72 and 81 of the agreement also gave provision for "routine inspections" to be carried out by the IAEA to determine compliance in that regard. However, the agreement only lasted until North Korea's withdrawal from the IAEA in 1994. North Korea was also suspended from the NPT in June 1993, before later withdrawing altogether in 2011.

A North Korean official stated in 2004 that the country's annual throughput of spent fuel was 110 tons. There is little information known beyond what North Korea reveals as the country repeatedly refuses international inspectors access to any of its nuclear facilities. An issue facing North Korea is whether the country's frequent power failures allow their nuclear reprocessing facilities to operate continuously, as shutdowns can lead to plutonium losses.

==== Iran ====
Iran signed the NPT in 1968 and as such is subject to the standard IAEA safeguards. The 2015 Joint Comprehensive Plan of Action (JCPOA) between Iran and the P5+1 does not specifically mention material unaccounted for. However, the agreement does stipulate that "Iran will provide the IAEA with all necessary information […] to verify the production of uranium ore concentrate and the inventory of uranium ore concentrate produced in Iran or obtained from any other source for 25 years." During the period of negotiation for the JCPOA, Iran concealed the existence of what the Middle East Forum describe as a "secret nuclear weapons archive." Once exposed, Iran allowed the IAEA access to its "undeclared nuclear sites" where tests performed by the IAEA proved the existence of MUF. However, "by that time the containers had been moved and the area 'sanitized'." The IAEA still have an unresolved, open investigation into this matter. In 2020 Iran refused to cooperate with inspectors sent by the IAEA to investigate material unaccounted for. The investigation was prompted by the IAEA's discovery of a spike in Iran's nuclear-fuel stockpile, far above the levels permitted under the JCPOA. The British, French and German governments jointly expressed "concerns over possible undeclared and unaccounted for nuclear material".

==== Israel ====
Israel has a long-standing policy of deliberate ambiguity with regards to its nuclear program, and as such, has not signed the NPT. On 18 September 2009 the General Conference of the IAEA called on Israel to open its nuclear facilities to IAEA inspection and adhere to the NPT as part of a resolution on "Israeli nuclear capabilities," which passed by a narrow margin of 49–45 with 16 abstentions. The chief Israeli delegate stated that "Israel will not co-operate in any matter with this resolution."

==== India ====
India has criticised the NPT because it "discriminate[s] against states not possessing nuclear weapons on 1 January 1967," and has said it will only sign the NPT if it is allowed to join as a nuclear-weapons state. But this is seen as unlikely. The Atomic Energy Regulatory Board is the government organisation responsible carrying out certain regulatory and safety functions under India's Atomic Energy Act, 1962. However, India's regulatory structure has been criticised by the Nuclear Threat Initiative for failures in its security and accounting practices. A report from 2014 states that key provisions "on security; and, in some cases, security measures are recommended, but not required. Weaknesses are particularly apparent in the areas of transport security, material control and accounting, and measures to protect against insider threat, such as personnel vetting and mandatory reporting of suspicious behaviour." India did agree in 2005, however, to the India–United States Civil Nuclear Agreement, classifying 14 of its 22 nuclear power plants as being for civilian use and to place them under IAEA safeguards, subject to inspections. Nonetheless, there is little information available from India's government in regards to nuclear matters except at the most general level, especially in regards to non-civilian use. In relation to the size of India's stockpiles of fissile materials (and related MUF figures), unofficial estimates have considerable uncertainties.

==== Pakistan ====
Pakistan has not signed the NPT, arguing, like India, that it is discriminatory. Foreign Secretary Aizaz Ahmad Chaudhry has said "It is a discriminatory treaty. Pakistan has the right to defend itself, so Pakistan will not sign the NPT. Why should we?" Pakistan had always asserted that it would sign the NPT if India did so. However, in 2010, Pakistan abandoned this position, stating that, like India, it would only join the NPT as a recognised nuclear-weapon state. Pakistan did notably sign a safeguards agreement with the IAEA in 1977 for the import of uranium concentrate from Niger. By extension, Pakistan's civilian nuclear component, which was built with foreign assistance, is under IAEA safeguards. Since 1974, however, Pakistan's nuclear complex has also had a significant military component, of which, there is no official quantitative information available in regards to fissile-material production or losses of said material.
