= World Association of Nuclear Operators =

Not for profit, international organisation

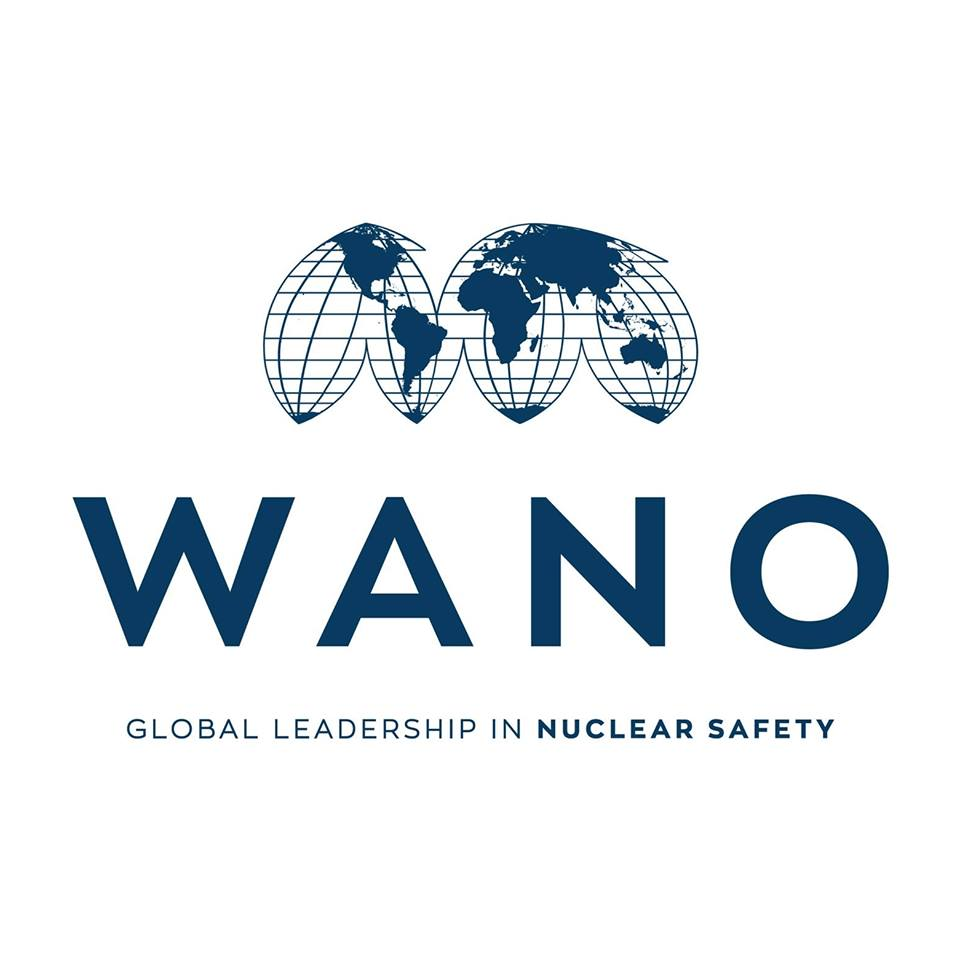
- Industry: Commercial Nuclear Energy
- Founded: 15 May 1989
- Headquarters: London, United Kingdom
- Area served: Worldwide
- Key people: Naoki Chigusa, Chief Executive Officer, Tom Mitchell, Chairman
- Members: 130 members with 460 plants
- Number of employees: 420
- Website: wano.info

The World Association of Nuclear Operators (WANO) is a nonprofit, international organisation with a mission to maximize the safety and reliability of the world's commercial nuclear power plants. The organization's members are mainly owners and operators of nuclear power plants.

It was established on 15 May 1989 following the 1986 nuclear accident at Chernobyl, in the Ukrainian SSR. After the event, nuclear operators worldwide began to work together through WANO to improve safety and reliability to prevent recurrences. Experience shows that many accidents could have been prevented if lessons would have been learned from previous incidents. WANO unites every company and country that has an operating commercial nuclear power plant to achieve the highest possible standards of nuclear safety and reliability. The organization enables members to provide mutual support, exchange safety knowledge and operating experience, and share best practices with each other to improve performance. WANO's members operate approximately 460 nuclear units in over 30 countries and areas worldwide.

WANO helps members communicate and share information through its five main programs: Peer Review, Performance Analysis, Member Support, Training & Development and Corporate Communications. WANO has offices in London and Shanghai, and has regional centers in Atlanta, Moscow, Paris and Tokyo.

== Mission ==
WANO's mission is to maximize the safety and reliability of nuclear power plants worldwide by working together to assess, benchmark and improve performance through mutual support, exchange of information and emulation of best practice.

== History ==
In light of the accident at the Chernobyl generating station in 1986, the leaders of commercial nuclear reactors worldwide set aside their competitive and regional differences and came together in 1989 to create the World Association of Nuclear Operators, or WANO.

WANO's inaugural meeting was held in Moscow on 15 May 1989. It was jointly hosted by Lord Walter Marshall of Goring, the chairman of Britain's largest utility, the Central Electricity Generating Board (CEGB), and Nikolai F Lukonin, the USSR's Minister of Atomic Energy. Around 140 delegates from 29 countries pledged their backing for the organisation and signed its new charter. Today, it supports more than 130 members who operate approximately 460 civil nuclear power reactors around the world.

In 1990, WANO published its first WANO Good Practice on Plant Predictive Maintenance and the organisation began its Performance Indicator (PI) programme to collect key performance data from members. WANO conducted its first Peer Review at Paks Nuclear Power Plant in Hungary in 1992. Peer Reviews became an official WANO Programme the following year. WANO made Peer Reviews a member obligation in 2006, with every commercial nuclear power plant in the world having received at least one Peer Review by 2010.

After the nuclear accident at Fukushima in 2011, WANO expanded to help members improve safety and performance. WANO identified 12 key post-Fukushima projects to implement in more than 460 commercial power plants worldwide to enhance safety.

== WANO programmes ==
- The Peer Review programme provides a critical assessment of station performance by an experienced team of global industry peers against nuclear industry standards of excellence as defined by WANO Performance Objectives and Criteria.
- The Performance Analysis programme collects, screens and analyses operating experience and performance data, providing members with understanding of data through industry performance reports. Fundamental to its success is the willingness of WANO members to openly share operating experience and performance data for the benefit of nuclear operators worldwide.
- The Member Support programme works with members to improve safety and reliability. Activities include member support missions; new unit assistance; principles, guidelines and good practices; and member support improvement. Together, they help members learn from the experiences of their peers.
- The Training & Development programme provides assistance to WANO members through workshops, seminars and training. This includes new entrants as well as operating stations. Specific activities include workshops, seminars, training courses and leadership courses.
- The Corporate Communications programme ensures WANO's mission, vision and activities are shared with all internal and external audiences, including WANO members, industry vendors, new entrants, nations considering adding nuclear to their energy mix, other interested parties and the media. A variety of channels are used to promote access to WANO products and services.

== See also ==
- World Institute for Nuclear Security
- Institute of Nuclear Power Operations
- International Atomic Energy Agency (IAEA)
- World Nuclear Association (WNA)
- Nuclear Energy Agency (OECD NEA)
- IYNC International
- World Nuclear University (WNU)
