= WNU =

WNU may refer to the following:

- World Nuclear University, a "Partnership for Sustainable Development" aimed to further the cause of the peaceful applications of nuclear technologies.
- Warren National University, a university in the United States
- West Negros University, a university in the Philippines now known as STI West Negros University
- Wold Newton Universe
- Worldwide News Ukraine, a Ukrainian news agency
