= YGN =

YGN may refer to:

- Yarra Glen railway station, Melbourne, Australia; by VicTrack station code
- Young Generation Network, a British nuclear industry organization and a branch of the Nuclear Institute
