= Institute of Nuclear Materials Management =

Organization concerning nuclear material

Institute of Nuclear Materials Management logo

The Institute of Nuclear Materials Management (INMM) is an international technical and professional organization that works to promote safe handling of nuclear material and the safe practice of nuclear materials management through publications, as well as organized presentations and meetings.

The INMM's headquarters is located in Deerfield, Illinois in the United States, but its members are located around the world including Europe, Asia, South America and North America. There are more than 1,100 members and 32 chapters.

Les Shephard, vice president of Sandia National Laboratories' Energy, Security, and Defense Technology Center, said in February 2009 of the INMM and the American Nuclear Society,

These are the two leading organizations in the world that address the challenges associated with nuclear energy, nonproliferation and nuclear materials management and that contribute significantly to the science and engineering foundation for nuclear energy worldwide.

== Structure ==
INMM is led by an executive committee of nine members, including a president, vice president, secretary, treasurer, four members-at-large, and the immediate past president. In addition, INMM has several standing and two technical committees. Many organizations, such as Los Alamos National Laboratory and Brookhaven National Laboratory, are Sustaining Members of the INMM.

== Technical divisions ==
In 2010, the INMM Executive Committee approved a restructuring of the institute. This included changes in the technical divisions. Some were merged and a new division was created. The technical divisions are:

- Facility Operations
- International Safeguards
- Materials Control and Accountability
- Nonproliferation and Arms Control
- Nuclear Security and Physical Protection
- Packaging, Transportation and Disposition

The division is the focal point for information and activities related to the physical protection of nuclear materials, nuclear facilities, and other high-value assets and facilities.

Until 2010, the INMM had six technical divisions:

- International Safeguards, focusing on the development of effective international nuclear material safeguards, and working to advance safeguard procedures and technology
- Materials Control and Accountability, promoting and communicating the need for development of technology for the control and accountability of nuclear materials
- Nonproliferation and Arms Control, promoting research to further international stability with regard to nonproliferation and international arms control
- Packaging and Transportation and Disposition, promoting technology and research aimed at the packaging and transportation of radioactive materials, including all levels of radioactive waste
- Nuclear Security and Physical Protection, focusing on research to advance technology for the physical protection of nuclear materials and nuclear facilities
- Waste Management, promoting research to help find a solution for the worldwide waste management issues, focusing on each step of waste management including handling, processing, storing, and disposal for all radioactive waste

== Best practices ==
The INMM develops and promotes global "best practices" for nuclear materials management. Best practices are based on past events, lessons learned, and ways to effectiveness and efficiency. They are focused on the six technical divisions and should be applicable to all countries with nuclear capabilities, both civilian and military.

In 2008, the INMM joined with Nuclear Threat Initiative, the United States Department of Energy, and the International Atomic Energy Agency to establish a new international organization called the World Institute for Nuclear Security (WINS) aimed at strengthening physical protection and security of the world's nuclear and radioactive materials and facilities. This organization's focus is on collecting information on best management practices from professionals responsible for on-the-ground security and sharing that information with their peer professionals around the world. These security professionals are in the best position to know where the vulnerabilities are, how to improve security, and how to ensure that improvements are implemented quickly and effectively. WINS will place a high priority on protecting sensitive information that may be discussed between members. Initial funding for the WINS included $3 million each from the Peter G. Peterson Foundation and the U.S. Department of Energy plus $100,000 from Norway.

== Chapters ==
The INMM has 32 chapters around the world, including six regional chapters in the United States and international chapters in Japan, South Korea, Morocco, Nigeria, Obninsk Regional in Russia, Russian Federation, South Africa, the United Kingdom, Ukraine, Urals, and Vienna.

The INMM also has 16 student chapters that offer opportunities including participation in a mentor program, meetings and workshops, publication subscriptions, and professional networking. Student chapters currently exist at Federal University of Rio de Janeiro, Georgia Institute of Technology, Idaho State University, Ibn Tofail University, Jordan University of Science and Technology, Mercyhurst College Institute for Intelligence Studies, Middlebury Institute of International Studies at Monterey, North Carolina State University and other Triangle Area universities, Oregon State University, Pandit Deendayal Petroleum University, Pennsylvania State University, Texas A&M University, the University of Michigan, University of Missouri, University of New Mexico, University of Tennessee, University of Utah, University of Washington, and Universitas Gadjah Mada

== Meetings and workshops ==
INMM holds an annual meeting, an annual Spent Fuel Management Seminar, and a number of other workshops each year. These educational/networking events allow professionals in nuclear materials management to learn new strategies, keep abreast of the science and technology, and to meet with colleagues from around the world. In June 2005, INMM held two workshops in Prague, Czech Republic, sponsored by the Nuclear Threat Initiative (NTI).

== Publications ==
INMM publishes the Journal of Nuclear Materials Management, a quarterly, peer-reviewed technical journal. In addition, the "Communicator", online newsletter is posted three times annually.

American physicist William Higginbotham served as technical editor of the Journal from 1974 until his death in 1994.

== See also ==
- American National Standards Institute
- U.S. Department of Energy
- U.S. Nuclear Regulatory Commission
- Brazilian-Argentine Agency for Accounting and Control of Nuclear Materials (ABACC)
- European Nuclear Society
- International Atomic Energy Agency
- American Nuclear Society
- Nuclear Threat Initiative
- World Nuclear Association
- Nuclear Energy Institute
