= International Nuclear Societies Council =

The International Nuclear Society Council (INSC), founded on 11 November 1990 by the INSG (International group of Nuclear Societies), is a non-governmental organisation made up of Nuclear Societies from all over the world that "acts as a global forum for nuclear societies to discuss and establish common aims and goals".

== Member societies ==
- American Nuclear Society (ANS)
- Asociacion Argentina de Tecnologia Nuclear (AATN)
- Associação Brasileira de Energia Nuclear (ABEN)
- Atomic Energy Society of Japan (AESJ)
- Australian Nuclear Association (ANA)
- Canadian Nuclear Society (CNS)
- Egyptian Society of Nuclear Science and Applications (ESNSA)
- European Nuclear Society (ENS)
  - Austrian Nuclear Society
  - Belgian Nuclear Society
  - Bulgarian Nuclear Society
  - Croatian Nuclear Society
  - Czech Nuclear Society
  - Finnish Nuclear Society
  - French Nuclear Energy Society
  - German Nuclear Society
  - Hungarian Nuclear Society
  - Israel Nuclear Society
  - Italian Nuclear Association
  - Lithuanian Nuclear Energy Association
  - Netherlands Nuclear Society
  - The Nuclear Institute
  - Nuclear Society of Russia
  - Nuclear Society of Serbia
  - Nuclear Society of Slovenia
  - Polish Nuclear Society
  - Romanian Nuclear Energy Association
  - Slovak Nuclear Society
  - Spanish Nuclear Society
  - Swedish Nuclear Society
  - Swiss Nuclear Society
- Indian Nuclear Society (InNS)
- Israel Nuclear Society (IsNS)
- Korean Nuclear Society (KNS)
- Latin American Section (LAS)
- Nuclear Energy Society Taipei (NEST)
- Pakistan Nuclear Society (PNS)
- Sociedad Nuclear Mexicana (SNM)
- Nuclear Society of Thailand (NST)
