= William Higinbotham =

American physicist (1910–1994)

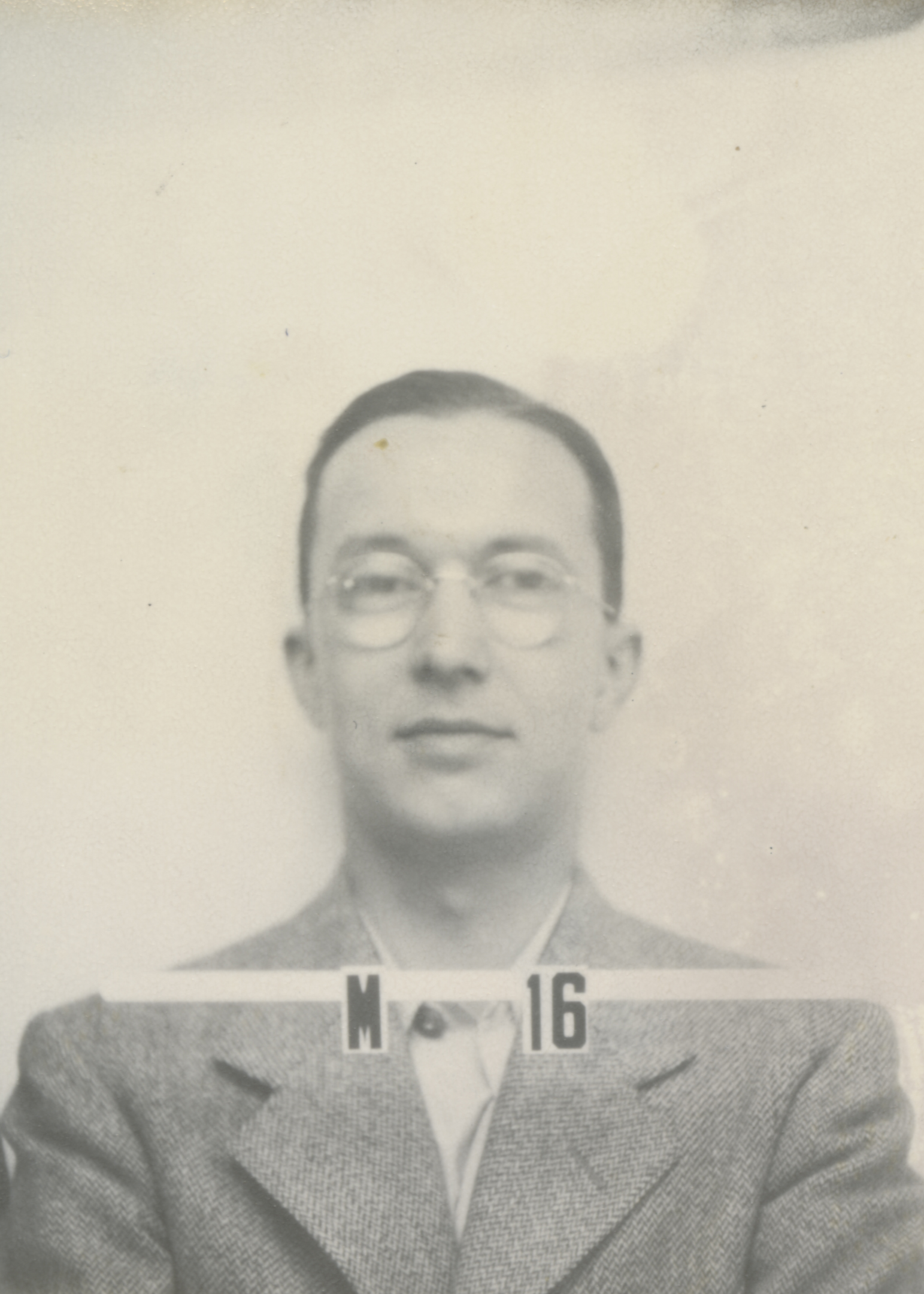
- Higinbotham's Los Alamos identity photo
- Born: October 22, 1910; Bridgeport, Connecticut, U.S.
- Died: November 10, 1994 (aged 84); Gainesville, Georgia, U.S.
- Known for: Nuclear nonproliferation, Tennis for Two, the first interactive analog computer game

William Alfred Higinbotham (October 22, 1910 – November 10, 1994) was an American physicist. A member of the team that developed the first nuclear bomb, he later became a leader in the nonproliferation movement. He also has a place in the history of video games for his 1958 creation of Tennis for Two, the first interactive analog computer game and one of the first electronic games to use a graphical display.

== Early life ==
Higinbotham was born in Bridgeport, Connecticut, and grew up in Caledonia, New York. His father was a minister in the Presbyterian Church. He earned his undergraduate degree from Williams College in 1932 and his studies at Cornell University. He worked on the radar system at MIT from 1941 to 1943.

== Career ==
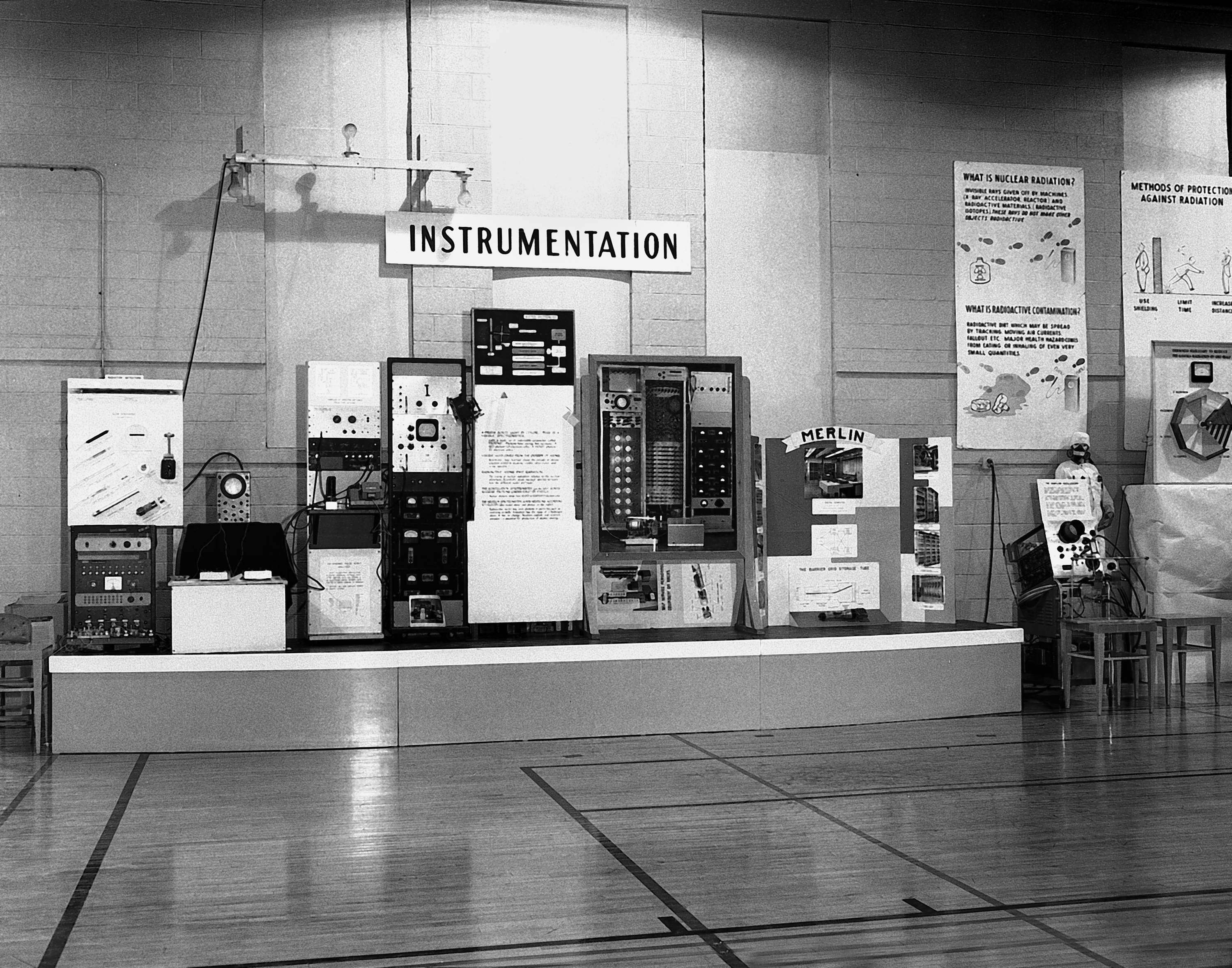
1958 exhibit of Tennis for Two

During World War II, he was working at Los Alamos Laboratory and headed the lab's electronics group in the later years of the war, where his team developed electronics for the first atomic bomb. His team created the bomb's ignition mechanism as well as measuring instruments for the device. Higinbotham also created the radar display for the experimental B-28 bomber. Following his experience with nuclear weapons, Higinbotham helped found the nuclear nonproliferation group Federation of American Scientists, serving as its first chairman and executive secretary. From 1974 until his death in 1994, Higinbotham served as the technical editor of the Journal of Nuclear Materials Management, published by the Institute of Nuclear Materials Management.

In 1947, Higinbotham took a position at Brookhaven National Laboratory, where he worked until his retirement in 1984. In 1958, as Head of the Instrumentation Division at Brookhaven, he created a computer game called Tennis for Two for the laboratory's annual exposition. A tennis simulator displayed on an oscilloscope, the game is credited with being one of the first video games. The game took Higinbotham a few weeks to complete, and was a popular attraction at the show. It was such a hit that Higinbotham created an expanded version for the 1959 exposition; this version allowed the gravity level to be changed so players could simulate tennis on Jupiter and the Moon. Higinbotham never patented Tennis for Two, though he obtained over 20 other patents during his career.

He recalled in 1983,

The instruction book that came with the computer described how to plot trajectories and bouncing shapes, for research. I thought, "Hell, this would make a good game." [Working with colleague Dave Potter], it took me four hours to design one and a technician a couple of weeks to put it together. ... Everybody stood in line to play [at the open house]. The other exhibits were pretty static, obviously. ... The game seemed to me sort of an obvious thing. Even if I had [wanted to patent it], the game would've belonged to the government.

== Legacy ==
In the 1980s, critics and historians began to recognize the significance of Tennis for Two in the development of video games. In 1983, David Ahl, who had played the game at the Brookhaven exhibition as a teenager, wrote a cover story for Creative Computing in which he dubbed Higinbotham the "Grandfather of Video Games". Independently, Frank Lovece interviewed Higinbotham for a story on the history of video games in the June 1983 issue of Video Review.

In 2011, Stony Brook University founded the William A. Higinbotham Game Studies Collection, managed by Head of Special Collections and University Archives Kristen Nyitray and Associate Professor of Digital Cultural Studies Raiford Guins. The Collection is explicitly dedicated to "documenting the material culture of screen-based game media", and in specific relation to Higinbotham: "collecting and preserving the texts, ephemera, and artifacts that document the history and work of early game innovator and Brookhaven National Laboratory scientist William A. Higinbotham, who in 1958 invented the first interactive analog computer game, Tennis for Two." As part of preserving the history of Tennis for Two, the Collection is producing a documentary on the history of the game and its reconstruction by Peter Takacs, physicist at Brookhaven National Laboratory.

Higinbotham remained little interested in video games, preferring to be remembered for his work in nuclear nonproliferation. After his death, as requests for information on Tennis for Two increased, his son William B. Higinbotham told Brookhaven: "It is imperative that you include information on his nuclear nonproliferation work. That was what he wanted to be remembered for." For this work the Federation of American Scientists named their headquarters Higinbotham Hall in 1994.
