= Nuclear Technology (journal) =

Scientific journal

- Discipline: Nuclear engineering
- Language: English
- Edited by: Yassin Hassan

Publication details
- Former names: Nuclear Applications (1965—1969); Nuclear Applications & Technology (1969—1971)
- History: 1965—present
- Publisher: Taylor & Francis; American Nuclear Society
- Frequency: Monthly
- Impact factor: 2 (2024)

Standard abbreviations
- ISO 4: Nucl. Technol.

Indexing
- CODEN: NUTYBB
- ISSN: 0029-5450

Links
- Journal homepage; Online access; Online archive

Nuclear Technology is a peer-reviewed scientific journal published by Taylor & Francis on behalf of American Nuclear Society. It covers research on the applications of nuclear engineering and related technologies, including but not limited to nuclear reactor technologies, radiation monitoring, nuclear safety analysis and nuclear medicine. Its current editor-in-chief is Yassin Hassan (Texas A&M University).

The journal was established in 1965 under the title Nuclear Applications, before being renamed to Nuclear Applications & Technology in between 1969 and 1971. Since 1971, it has been published under its current title. The journal's supplement for fusion power became a separate publication in 1984, eventually becoming known as Fusion Science and Technology.

== Abstracting and indexing ==
The journal is abstracted and indexed in:

- Current Contents/Engineering, Computing & Technology
- EBSCO databases
- Ei Compendex
- Inspec
- Science Citation Index Expanded
- Scopus

According to the Journal Citation Reports, the journal has a 2024 impact factor of 2.
