= World Nuclear Transport Institute =

World Nuclear Transport Institute (WNTI)
- Type: Non-profit, Membership
- Industry: Transport of Nuclear and Radioactive Material
- Founded: 1998
- Headquarters: London, United Kingdom
- Key people: Professor Pete Bryant Chief Executive Officer
- Website: www.wnti.co.uk

The World Nuclear Transport Institute (WNTI) is an international organisation that represents the collective interests of the nuclear power and packaging industries, and those who rely on it for the safe, efficient, and reliable transport of radioactive materials. Through the WNTI, companies are working together to promote a sound international framework for the future by helping to build international consensus through co-operation and understanding. The Institute was founded in 1998. The WNTI is a private, non-profit organisation funded by membership subscriptions. Member companies are drawn from a wide range of industry sectors including major utilities, fuel producers and fabricators, transport companies, package designers, package producers and mines. Headquartered in London, the WNTI Secretariat has a small staff of qualified professionals working closely with members and other international bodies involved in the transport of radioactive materials.

== Organisation ==
The Board of Directors currently comprises seven directors and meets biannually. Headquartered in London, the Institute is managed by the Secretary General. The Secretary General chairs an Advisory Committee which reports to the Board of Directors. The WNTI operates successfully as a network organisation, with regional offices in Tokyo and Washington, D.C.

== Objectives ==
- To ensure that radioactive materials are transported by sea, land and air safely, efficiently and reliably through the harmonised application of national and international standards, regulations and procedures;
- To consult with governmental and non-governmental organizations to support balanced international standards, regulations, guidelines and procedures through the preparation of industry position papers, technical briefs and scientific research;
- To act as a catalyst and facilitator bringing members together to exchange views on radioactive materials transport issues and to participate in appropriate meetings, conferences and media briefings;
- To support research, development and testing of packaging and systems for the transport of radioactive materials.

== Roles ==
The WNTI provides:

- A forum for members to share information and ideas;
- Well-researched, consolidated positions;
- Time-sensitive, value-added analyses of regulatory changes;
- Technical research, studies and publications;
- Dialogue with intergovernmental organisations;
- A collective voice for industry.

== International cooperation ==
Intergovernmental organisations such as the International Atomic Energy Agency (IAEA) and the International Maritime Organization (IMO) play a crucial role in establishing standards and regulations that apply to radioactive materials transport. Through its non-governmental status, the WNTI supports the work of these organizations in promoting an efficient international transport safety regime.

Exchanges within intergovernmental organisations, with competent authorities and collaboration with related industry organisations such as FORATOM, the Nuclear Energy Institute (NEI), the World Nuclear Association (WNA), the World Institute for Nuclear Security (WINS) and the International Organization for Standardization (ISO) are essential and remain a priority for the WNTI.

== Publication overview ==
The WNTI produces technical and factual information to support a background for balanced policies and regulations. Scientific and other academic papers are published regularly and presented to key officials including regulators. The WNTI public website provides information on nuclear transport including the nuclear fuel cycle, non-fuel cycle transport, regulations, packages and also includes an image library.
