= Uranium Information Centre =

- Abbreviation: UIC
- Successor: World Nuclear Association (information role); Australian Uranium Association (domestic role, 2008; later Minerals Council of Australia uranium portfolio, 2013)
- Formation: 1978
- Type: Non-profit information centre
- Purpose: Public information on uranium mining and nuclear electricity generation
- Location: Australia
- Region served: Australia (domestic); international (information resources)
- Official language: English
- Key people: Ian Hore-Lacy (General Manager, 1995–2001)
- Affiliations: World Nuclear News (information function assumed in late 2000s)
- Funding: Companies involved in uranium exploration, mining, and export in Australia

The Uranium Information Centre (UIC) was an Australian organisation primarily concerned with increasing the public understanding of uranium mining and nuclear electricity generation.

Founded in 1978, the Centre worked for many years to provide information about the development of the Australian uranium industry, the contribution it can make to world energy supplies and the benefits it can bring Australia. It was a broker of information on all aspects of the mining and processing of uranium, the nuclear fuel cycle, and the role of nuclear energy in helping to meet world electricity demand.

The Centre was funded by companies involved in uranium exploration, mining and export in Australia.

In 1995 Ian Hore-Lacy assumed the role of General Manager of the UIC, a position he held until 2001. The UIC's website was established in the year of his appointment. After leaving the UIC, Ian Hore-Lacy went on to work for the World Nuclear Association (WNA) as Director of Public Information for 12 years and as of 2015 he continues to work there as a Senior Research Analyst. In the late 2000s, the UIC's main information-providing function was assumed by the WNA and World Nuclear News (WNN), based in London, UK.

In 2008 the UIC's purely domestic function was taken over by the Australian Uranium Association, and was subsequently absorbed by the Minerals Council of Australia's uranium portfolio in 2013.

== See also ==
- List of uranium mines
- World Uranium Hearing
- Uranium mining debate
