= Chinese Nuclear Society =

Chinese non-profit organization

- Abbreviation: CNS
- Formation: 1980
- Type: non-profit organization
- Region served: Mainland China
- Official language: Chinese
- Chairman: Wáng Shòujūn (王寿君)
- Parent organization: China Association for Science and Technology
- Website: Chinese Nuclear Society

The Chinese Nuclear Society (CNS; Chinese: 中国核学会) is a non-profit organization representing individuals contributing to and supporting nuclear science, nuclear technology and nuclear engineering in China.

== Objectives ==
It was established in 1980. Its objective is to promote the advancement and peaceful use of nuclear science and technology, undertake scientific and technical exchange, engage in public communication and enhance international cooperation and carries out Conferences, seminars, workshops, etc.; Transactions and publications; Lectures and materials to the public, media; Exhibitions; Visits to and from other overseas partners; Policy suggestions to government authorities.

== Membership ==
The membership of the Society consists of regular members, student members and organization members. Membership is open to any person or organization supporting the object of the Society and agreeing with the rules of the Society, each applicant for membership could submit an application to the Secretariat. The Society has about 8810 individual members and 45 organization members.

== Organization ==
The supreme authority in the Society is the National General Conference, and its executive body is the Board of Directors. The National General Conference is held every four years. The Secretariat under the leadership of the Board of Director is responsible for daily operation, and the Secretary General is the chief administrative officer of the Society.

== Committees ==
The Society has 7 committees carrying our specified functions of the Society, 20 technical divisions enhancing activities in specific areas of nuclear science and technology, 20 provincial branches serving members in geographical provinces. Committees: scientific exchange committee, public communication and inquiry committee, education and human resource committee, editorial committee, organization committee, financial committee, women-in-nuclear committee

== Technical divisions ==
Technical Divisions: Calculation Physics, Isotope, Isotope Separation Technology, Nuclear Agronomy, Nuclear Chemical Engineering, Nuclear Chemistry and Radiochemistry, Nuclear Electronics and Nuclear Detection Techniques, Nuclear Fusion and Plasma Physics, Nuclear Industry Applications, Nuclear Materials, Nuclear Medicine, Nuclear Physics, Nuclear Power, Nuclear Science and Technology Information, Nuclear Techno-economics and Management, Particles Accelerator Technology, Radiation Protection, Radiation Research and Technology, Uranium Geology, Uranium Mining and Metallurgy.

== Branches ==
Provincial Branches: Anhui, Beijing, Fujian, Gansu, Guangdong, Guizhou, Henan, Hubei, Hunan, Jiangsu, Jiangxi, Jilin, Liaoning, Shanghai, Shanxi, Shanxxi, Sichuan, Tianjin, Xinjiang, Zhejiang. Under each of Technical divisions and Provincial Branches, there are a number of committees focusing on specific technical area.

== See also ==
- List of nuclear power groups
  - American Nuclear Society
  - European Nuclear Society
  - Canadian Nuclear Society
