= Fusion Science and Technology =

Scientific journal

- Discipline: Fusion technology; plasma science; nuclear science
- Language: English
- Edited by: Arkady Serikov

Publication details
- Former names: Nuclear Technology/Fusion (1981—1984); Fusion Technology (1984—2001)
- History: 1981—present
- Publisher: Taylor & Francis; American Nuclear Society
- Frequency: 8/year
- Impact factor: 1.2 (2024)

Standard abbreviations
- ISO 4: Fusion Sci. Technol.

Indexing
- CODEN: FEROA8
- ISSN: 1536-1055

Links
- Journal homepage; Online access; Online archive

Fusion Science and Technology is a peer-reviewed scientific journal published by Taylor & Francis on behalf of American Nuclear Society. It covers research on the applications of nuclear fusion and plasma on fusion power. Its current editor-in-chief is Arkady Serikov (Karlsruhe Institute of Technology).

The journal was established in 1981 as a supplement to the journal Nuclear Technology, before being a separate journal under the name Fusion Technology in 1984. It was renamed to Fusion Science and Technology in 2001.

== Abstracting and indexing ==
The journal is abstracted and indexed in:

- Current Contents/Engineering, Computing & Technology
- EBSCO databases
- Ei Compendex
- Inspec
- Science Citation Index Expanded
- Scopus

According to the Journal Citation Reports, the journal has a 2024 impact factor of 1.2.
