= Alpha Nu Sigma =

American nuclear engineering honor society

- ΑΝΣ
- Founded: June 5, 1979; 46 years ago
- Type: Honor
- Affiliation: American Nuclear Society
- Status: Active
- Emphasis: Nuclear energy
- Scope: National
- Motto: "Energy Newly Born Through Wisdom"
- Member badge
- Colors: White
- Chapters: 25
- Members: 4,300+ lifetime
- Headquarters: c/o American Nuclear Society; 555 N. Kensington Ave. La Grange Park, Illinois 60526-5592; United States
- Website: www.ans.org/honors/ansnhs/

Alpha Nu Sigma (ΑΝΣ) is an American nuclear engineering honor society affiliated with the American Nuclear Society. It has chartered more than 25 chapters at universities in the United States.

== History ==
Alpha Nu Sigma National Honor Society was established by the American Nuclear Society on June 5, 1979. it was established to "recognize high scholarship, integrity, and potential achievement among outstanding degree-seeking nuclear engineering students at institutions of higher learning". Alpha Nu Sigma quickly grew in size, obtaining seventeen chapters and 320 members by its third anniversary in June 1982.

By the end of 1985, Alpha Nu Sigma had established 23 chapters with 920 members. The Chernobyl disaster occurred in 1986, and the growth of the society has struggled since that event. As of 2024, it has chartered more than 25 chapters and has initiated more than 4,300 total members.

== Symbols ==
The motto of Alpha Nu Sigma is Αλκή νεογέγονεν δία Σοφία, meaning "Energy Newly Born Through Wisdom". The symbol and badge of Alpha Nu Sigma contains "three ellipses representing electron orbits surrounding a nucleus of protons and neutrons" with the Greek letters of the society superimposed. Its honor cord color is white.

== Membership ==
Membership selection criteria for Alpha Nu Sigma are outlined in the national honor society's constitution. The criteria are summarized as follows:

- Candidates for membership must be enrolled in a program to pursue an academic degree in an applied nuclear science, nuclear engineering, or nuclear-engineering option curriculum.
- Juniors shall be eligible if they rank in the top quarter of their peer group.
- Seniors and graduate students shall be eligible if they rank in the top third of their peer group.
- Faculty members shall also be eligible for membership.
- Honorary membership may be awarded to individuals who have made "exemplary contributions in the field of nuclear science and engineering that have had a seminal permanent impact nationally or internationally".

== Chapters ==
As of fall 2021, the following table lists the chapters of Alpha Nu Sigma.

| Institution | Location | Status | Ref. |
|---|---|---|---|
| Excelsior University | Albany, New York | Active | |
| Georgia Tech | Atlanta, Georgia | Inactive | |
| Idaho State University | Pocatello, Idaho | Inactive | |
| Kansas State University | Manhattan, Kansas | Active | |
| Massachusetts Institute of Technology | Cambridge, Massachusetts | Active | |
| Missouri University of Science and Technology | Rolla, Missouri | Active | |
| North Carolina State University | Raleigh, North Carolina | Active | |
| Ohio State University | Columbus, Ohio | Active | |
| Oregon State University | Corvallis, Oregon | Active | |
| Pennsylvania State University | University Park, Pennsylvania | Active | |
| Purdue University | West Lafayette, Indiana | Active | |
| Rensselaer Polytechnic Institute | Troy, New York | Active | |
| South Carolina State University | Orangeburg, South Carolina | Active | |
| Texas A&M University | College Station, Texas | Active | |
| United States Military Academy | West Point, New York | Active | |
| United States Naval Academy | Annapolis, Maryland | Active | |
| University of California, Berkeley | Berkeley, California | Inactive | |
| University of Florida | Gainesville, Florida | Inactive | |
| University of Illinois at Urbana–Champaign | Urbana, Illinois | Active | |
| University of Maryland, College Park | College Park, Maryland | Inactive | |
| University of Massachusetts Lowell | Lowell, Massachusetts | Inactive | |
| University of Michigan | Ann Arbor, Michigan | Active | |
| University of New Mexico | Albuquerque, New Mexico | Active | |
| University of Tennessee | Knoxville, Tennessee | Active | |
| University of Texas at Austin | Austin, Texas | Inactive | |
| University of Utah | Salt Lake City, Utah | Inactive | |
| University of Wisconsin–Madison | Madison, Wisconsin | Inactive | |
| Virginia Tech | Blacksburg, Virginia | Inactive | |

== Honorary members ==
As of spring 2020, the following table lists notable honorary members of Alpha Nu Sigma.

| Name | Chapter | Year | Notability | Ref. |
|---|---|---|---|---|
| Manson Benedict | Massachusetts Institute of Technology | 1982 | Chairman of the advisory committee to the United States Atomic Energy Commission; | |
| Noel Corngold | New Jersey Institute of Technology | 1984 | Professor of physics at California Institute of Technology | |
| Nils J. Diaz | University of Florida | 2000 | Chairman of the Nuclear Regulatory Commission | |
| James J. Duderstadt | University of Michigan | 1986 | President of the University of Michigan | |
| Joseph M. Hendrie | New Jersey Institute of Technology | 1983 | Chairman of the Nuclear Regulatory Commission | |
| Norman Hilberry | University of Arizona | 1993 | Director of the Argonne National Laboratory | |
| Henry Hurwitz | Rensselaer Polytechnic Institute | 1983 | Pioneered the theory and design of nuclear power plants | |
| Herbert J.C. Kouts | New Jersey Institute of Technology | 1983 | Director of reactor safety research at the United States Atomic Energy Commission | |
| W. Bennett Lewis | Iowa State University | 1983 | Directed the development of the CANDU reactor | |
| Robert L. Long | National officers | 1991 | Commander of the United States Pacific Command | |
| David J. Rose | Massachusetts Institute of Technology | 1985 | Professor of nuclear engineering at MIT | |
| Frederick Seitz | University of Illinois at Urbana–Champaign | 1991 | President of the United States National Academy of Sciences | |
| Chauncey Starr | Iowa State University | 1983 | Founded the Electric Power Research Institute | |
| Edward Teller | Kansas State University | 1989 | Known as "the father of the hydrogen bomb" | |

== See also ==
- American Nuclear Society
