= Women in Nuclear =

International professional association

Women in Nuclear is a global not-for-profit organization with over 35,000 members from145 countries. The organization was established in 1993 and is governed by an elected board and executive. The organization is sponsored under the auspices of the World Nuclear Association and its objectives are identified as including the dissemination of factual information about nuclear and radiation technology, professional exchange among its members, and promotion of career opportunities in the nuclear industry. Although open to both women and men, members are primarily women working in nuclear technology related industries including academia, uranium mining, nuclear power generation, regulatory agencies, nuclear medicine, related organizations such as the International Atomic Energy Agency, and government officials.

== Chapters ==
Chapters include:

- US Women in Nuclear (formed 1999)
- Women in Nuclear Canada (formed 2004)
- Women in Nuclear UK (formed 2014)
