= Nuclear material =

Material used to produce nuclear energy

Nuclear material refers to the elements uranium, plutonium, and thorium, in any form, according to the IAEA. This is differentiated further into "source material", consisting of natural and depleted uranium, and "special fissionable material", consisting of enriched uranium (U-235), uranium-233, and plutonium-239. Uranium ore concentrates are considered to be a "source material", although these are not subject to safeguards under the Nuclear Non-Proliferation Treaty.

According to the Nuclear Regulatory Commission (NRC), there are four different types of regulated nuclear materials: special nuclear material, source material, byproduct material and radium. Special nuclear materials have plutonium, uranium-233 or uranium with U^{233} or U^{235} that has a content found more than in nature. Source material is thorium or uranium that has a U^{235} content equal to or less than what is in nature. Byproduct material is radioactive material that is not source or special nuclear material. It can be an isotope produced by a nuclear reactor, the tailings and waste that is produced or extracted from uranium or thorium from an ore that processed mainly for its source material content. Byproduct material can also be discrete sources of radium-226 or discrete sources of accelerator-produced isotopes or naturally occurring isotopes that pose a threat greater or equal to a discrete source of radium-226. Radium is also a regulated nuclear material that is found in nature and produced by the radioactive decay of uranium. The half-life of radium is approximately 1,600 years.

Different countries may use different terminology: in the United States of America, "nuclear material" most commonly refers to "special nuclear materials" (SNM), with the potential to be made into nuclear weapons as defined in the Atomic Energy Act of 1954. The "special nuclear materials" are also plutonium-239, uranium-233, and enriched uranium (U-235).

Note that the 1980 Convention on the Physical Protection of Nuclear Material definition of nuclear material does not include thorium.

The NRC has a regulatory process for nuclear materials with five main components.

1. Develop regulation and guidance for their applicants and licensees
2. Licensing, decommissioning and certification for applicants to use nuclear materials, or operate a nuclear facility or decommission a permit license termination
3. Oversight of licensee operations and facilities that ensure that licensees comply with the safety requirements
4. Operational experience at licensed facilities or licensed activities
5. Support for decisions by conducting research, holding hearings that address concerns, and obtain independent reviews that support the NRC regulatory decisions

The United States Department of Energy Office of Environmental Management (EM) manages and dispositions spent nuclear fuel and surplus nuclear materials. The EM Nuclear Materials Program safely and securely manages the spent nuclear fuels in their facilities while managing an inventory of the materials. The Nuclear Waste Policy Act defines procedures to evaluate and select locations for geological repositories to safely dispose/store the radioactive waste. The EM also works with the National Nuclear Security Administration (NNSA) to dispose the surplus, non-pit, weapons-usable plutonium-239. EM with the NNSA, oversee the disposition of 21 metric tons of surplus highly enriched uranium materials that has about 13.5 metric tons of spent nuclear fuel.

== See also ==
- Tube Alloys
- Institute of Nuclear Materials Management
- Material unaccounted for
