= Nuclear Institute =

- Abbreviation: NI
- Formation: 2009
- Legal status: Registered charity
- Purpose: Nuclear energy in the UK
- Location: London, W1
- Region served: UK
- President: Fiona Rayment (2024-2025)
- Main organ: Board of Trustees
- Affiliations: Engineering Council
- Website: www.nuclearinst.com

The Nuclear Institute is the professional body representing nuclear professionals in the UK.

It is a charity independent of the industry that promotes knowledge of nuclear energy amongst its members and the public and offers a route to professional qualification for those working in the sector, including nuclear engineers and scientists. It supports and encourages educational initiatives that will benefit the skills needed for design, build, operation, decommissioning and waste management of nuclear systems. It publishes Nuclear Future journal every two months and holds regular meetings throughout the UK; many evening meetings are open to the public and free of charge.

== History ==
It was formed on 1 January 2009 from the merger of the British Nuclear Energy Society (BNES), a learned society, and the Institution of Nuclear Engineers (INucE), a professional institute. Both organisations had the same former address. The merger was agreed on 23 April 2008. In 2010, the Institute became a member of the UK Science Council. It is licensed by the Science Council to award Chartered Scientist status to qualifying members.

=== BNES ===
It was formed in 1962. It had around 1,400 members. The BNES formed the Young Generation Network in 1996. Its last president was John Earp.

=== INucE ===
Institution of Nuclear Engineers (INucE) was founded in 1959. It was a Nominated Body of the Engineering Council UK. Members of the institute would be given the title "Fellow of the Institution of Nuclear Engineers" (FINucE). The last president was David Whitworth.

== Functions ==
It represents the UK nuclear power industry. It publishes Nuclear Future every two months. It holds conferences and meetings throughout the UK.

The NI annually hosts the Universities’ Nuclear Technology Forum, which stands as one of the oldest nuclear engineering meetings globally; 2025 University of Strathclyde 2024 University of Leeds 2023 University of Bristol 2022 University Bangor, 2022 University Bangor, 2021 unknown, 2020 University Bangor, 2019 University of Surrey, 2018 Lancaster University, 2017 University of Liverpool, 2016 unknown, 2015 The Open University in Milton Keynes, 2010 University of Salford.

== See also ==
- Institution of Mechanical Engineers
- Energy Institute
- European Nuclear Society
- Nuclear Energy Agency
- Nuclear Decommissioning Authority
