= NSW Minerals Council =

The NSW Minerals Council is a lobbying body created by the large mining companies operating in New South Wales. Its main purpose is to forward the economic interests of those companies and related industries by lobbying politicians and the public.

== Campaigns ==
The Minerals Council, headed by CEO Stephen Galilee, has run many campaigns recently highlighting, in their opinion, the social and economic benefits conveyed on the Hunter Valley by the mining industry, especially the coal mining industry, in the face of campaigning by locals, farmers and environmentalists, concerned about mining's impacts food & water supply, coal dust health impacts, the destruction of natural heritage and coals impact on global warming. These include the frog ads found in a number of newspapers in NSW, and the current campaign entitled "Life. Brought to you by Mining".

The "Life..." campaign is also supported by Centennial Coal and the mining arm of the CFMEU.
