= World Nuclear Association =

International non-profit organization

- World Nuclear Association Logo
- Founded: 2001; 25 years ago
- Type: Non-profit
- Purpose: Nuclear power
- Location(s): London, England, United Kingdom
- Region served: Worldwide
- Members: 181
- Key people: Sama Bilbao y León - Director General
- Employees: 30
- Website: World-Nuclear.org

The World Nuclear Association is the international organization that promotes nuclear power and supports the companies that comprise the global nuclear industry. Its members come from all parts of the nuclear fuel cycle, including uranium mining, uranium conversion, uranium enrichment, nuclear fuel fabrication, plant manufacture, transport, and the disposal of used nuclear fuel, as well as electricity generation itself.

Together, World Nuclear Association members are responsible for 70% of the world's nuclear power as well as the vast majority of world uranium, conversion and enrichment production. The Association says it aims to fulfill a dual role for its members: facilitating their interaction on technical, commercial and policy matters, and promoting wider public understanding of nuclear technology. It has a secretariat of around 30 staff. The Association was founded in 2001 on the basis of the Uranium Institute, itself founded in 1975.

== Membership ==
The World Nuclear Association continues to expand its membership, particularly in non-OECD countries where nuclear power is produced or where this option is under active consideration. Members are located in 44 countries representing 80% of the world's population.

The annual subscription fee for an institutional member is based on its size and scale of activity. Upon receiving an inquiry or application, the Association's London-based secretariat determines the fee according to standardized criteria and informs the candidate organisation accordingly. The fee structure provides, in many cases, significant discounts for organisations located in countries outside the OECD.

A low-fee non-commercial membership is available for organisations with a solely academic, research, policy or regulatory function.

A list of current members is published on the World Nuclear Association website.

== Charter of Ethics ==
The World Nuclear Association has established a Charter of Ethics to serve as a common credo for its member organizations. This affirmation of values and principles is intended to summarize the responsibilities of the nuclear industry and the surrounding legal and institutional framework that has been constructed through international cooperation to fulfill U.S. President Dwight D. Eisenhower's vision of 'Atoms for Peace'.

== Leadership ==
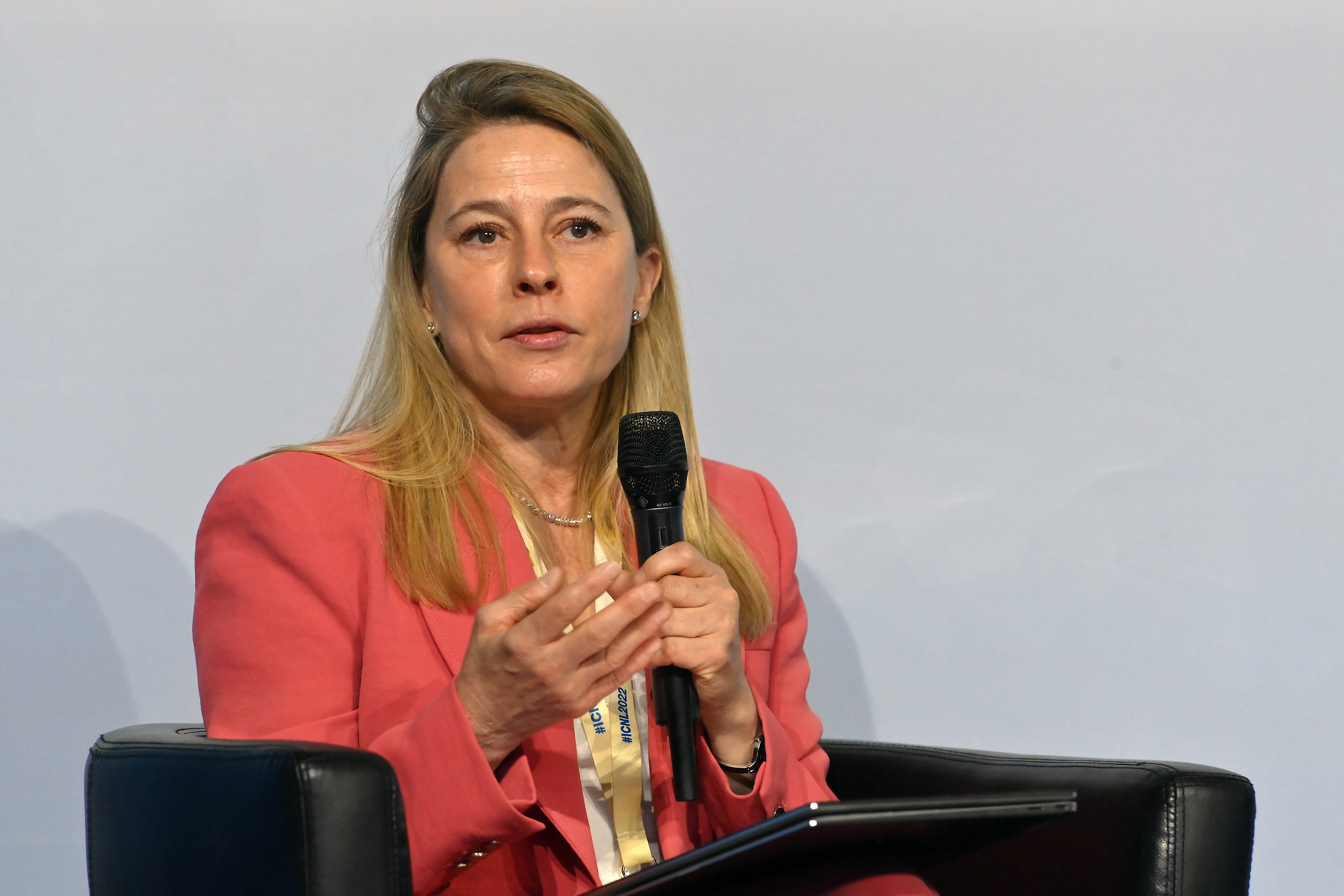
Sama Bilbao y Leon in 2022

World Nuclear Association members appoint a Director General and elect a 20-member board of management. The current Director General is Sama Bilbao y León. The Chairman of the board is H.E. Mohamed Al Hammadi, Managing Director and Chief Executive Officer of Emirates Nuclear Energy Corporation. The Vice Chairman and Chairman Elect is Johan Svenningsson, Country Chairman and CEO Uniper Sweden. A board of management fulfills statutory duties pertaining to the organization's governance and sets World Nuclear Association policies and strategic objectives, subject to approval by the full membership.

== Activities and services ==
=== Industry interaction ===
An essential role of the World Nuclear Association is to facilitate commercially valuable interaction among its members.

Ongoing World Nuclear Association Working Groups, consisting of members and supported by the secretariat, share information and develop analysis on a range of technical, trade and environmental matters. These subjects include:

- Cooperation in reactor design, evaluation and licensing
- Radiological protection
- Industry economics
- Nuclear law
- Supply chain
- Transport of radioactive materials
- Waste management and decommissioning
- Capacity optimization
- Uranium mining standardization
- Construction risk management
- Security of the international fuel cycle
- Fuel market report working group

When meeting to discuss industry issues, World Nuclear Association members are cautioned to avoid any topic that could potentially create even the impression of an attempt to set prices or engage in other anti-competitive behaviour. Accordingly, topics not discussed in meetings include terms of specific contracts; current or projected prices for products or services; allocation of markets; refusals to deal with particular suppliers or customers; or any similar matters that might impair competition within any segment of the nuclear industry.

=== Meetings ===
The World Nuclear Association's annual Symposium in London provides a forum for speakers from the nuclear industry. The Association has previously presented an award for 'Distinguished Contribution to the Peaceful Worldwide Use of Nuclear Energy'.

The Association also cooperates with the Nuclear Energy Institute on annual World Nuclear Fuel Cycle meetings for industry representatives concerned with nuclear fuel supply and in particular the uranium market.

=== Representation ===
The World Nuclear Association represents the interests of the international nuclear industry at key international forums such as:

- International Atomic Energy Agency and Nuclear Energy Agency advisory committees on transport and all aspects of nuclear safety
- United Nations policy forums focused on sustainable development and climate change. (The Association was in attendance at the 2009 Copenhagen climate change talks and at COP26)
- International Commission on Radiological Protection and OSPAR deliberations on radiological protection.

In contrast to earlier less structured forms of industry representation the Association provides a unified voice from a single body; encompassing all manner of industry expertise and perspectives. It is clear and unreserved in its purpose of promoting the maximum feasible use of safe nuclear power.

=== Public information ===
The World Nuclear Association public website provides an available, non-technical source of information on the global nuclear industry. The site presents reference documents, and a wide range of educational and explanatory papers which are constantly updated. Australian nuclear power advocate Ian Hore-Lacy served as the organization's Director of Public Information for 12 years, after working for six years at the now defunct Melbourne-based Uranium Information Centre. In the late 2000's, the information-disseminating role was assumed by the World Nuclear Association and World Nuclear News (WNN). Its output is free of charge and may be reproduced in accordance with WNN's copyright policy.

The Association's reactor database contains information on past, present and future nuclear power reactors across the world.

=== Other services ===
The World Nuclear Association is engaged in a number of other initiatives to promote the peaceful development of nuclear power. These include World Nuclear University (WNU), which is a global partnership between the World Nuclear Association, the International Atomic Energy Agency, The OECD Nuclear Energy Agency and the World Association of Nuclear Operators committed to enhancing international education and leadership in the peaceful applications of nuclear science and technology. It runs a series of programmes designed to complement existing institutions of nuclear learning in their curriculum. The premier event on the WNU calendar is the Summer Institute, which runs each year in July and brings together speakers from industry and government to present on all aspects of nuclear power. It also runs five one-week courses per year with partner universities around the world intended to enhance knowledge of today's nuclear industry among students.

== See also ==
- Institute of Nuclear Materials Management
- International Atomic Energy Agency
- World Nuclear Transport Institute
