= Convention on the Physical Protection of Nuclear Material =

1980 treaty

The Convention on the Physical Protection of Nuclear Material was adopted on 26 October 1979 in Vienna, Austria. The initial signing ceremony took place in Vienna and at New York on 3 March 1980, and the convention entered into force on 8 February 1987. The convention is deposited with the International Atomic Energy Agency. In July 2005 a diplomatic conference was convened to amend the convention and strengthen its provisions, as a result of which it was renamed the Convention on the Physical Protection of Nuclear Material and Nuclear Facilities.

As of October 2018, there are 157 state parties to the convention plus the European Atomic Energy Community.

Upon accession, 41 countries declared themself as not bound by the provisions of the competence of the International Court of Justice in settlement of the disputes according to Article 17 paragraph 2 of the Convention by reservations and objections. Five countries withdrew these objections thereafter.

== Background ==
In the 1970s, concerns were raised regarding possible theft or diversion of nuclear matter by various non-state actors. This led to awareness regarding the vulnerability of such sensitive material, and the International Atomic Energy Agency started conversations through an advisory group of experts in the field. These were a set of nonbinding recommendations that were later made into "Recommendations for the Physical Protection of Nuclear Material".

Following this, the 1975 review conference of the Non-Proliferation Treaty, along with the IAEA’s general conference, advocated for a legally binding framework in compliance with the INFCIRC/225. This led to the Director General of the IAEA circulating a draft convention. Under this agenda, government representatives met in 1977. Two years later, in 1979, the text of the convention was finalised after four meetings. A total of 58 countries and the European Atomic Energy Community participated in this process.

The scope of the article was restricted to nuclear material, which was in international nuclear transport. However, during the discussions, multiple contentions were raised regarding whether the scope should be restricted to only international transport or if it must include domestic transport as well. Other major contentions were whether the convention should include nuclear material used for military purposes and the dispute settlement mechanisms, especially with respect to compulsory arbitration or ICJ referral, or if it should be optional and negotiation based.

== The 2005 Amendment ==
In 1999, further concerns were raised about the narrow scope of the treaty and the need to strengthen the physical protection regime. This was followed by the meetings of the Open-ended Group of Experts in 2001, and in 2003, a draft of the new amendment was made.

Following this, in 2004, Austria and 24 co-sponsoring states formally proposed amendments to the IAEA Director General, triggering the treaty's amendment procedure under Article 20 of the CPPNM. Preceding this, a diplomatic conference was held in Vienna. A total of 88 states and EURATOM participated in the discussions. The Amendment was adopted by consensus on 8 July 2005. The 2005 Amendment substantially expands the scope of the Convention by introducing multiple changes in substance and objective. The major changes introduced were:

- The amendment has extended the scope of the convention by permitting the convention to extend physical protection beyond international nuclear transport. This includes the nuclear material in domestic use, storage and transport, giving the signatories a national responsibility as well. Another major extension is the inclusion of nuclear facilities against sabotage in the binding provisions.
- The amendment criminalises new acts, including smuggling and sabotage of nuclear facilities. It also introduces new ancillary offences related to the contribution or organisation of an offence apart from the already existing threat or attempt. Another major addition to this list was the addition of “substantial damage to the environment.”
- The amendment also broadens the bases for cooperation as well as information sharing between states and the IAEA in cases of credible threat of sabotage and other cooperation for guidance with respect to improving their existing physical protection. It also provides for a conference of state parties to review implementation five years after entry into force.
- The amendment excludes the activities of a state's armed forces in the course of their official duties from its scope. although expresses that this does not authorise the use or threatened use of force against nuclear material or facilities used for peaceful purposes.

These Amendments required no signature and would enter into force, as under Article 20, Paragraph 2, thirty days after two-thirds of states parties to the Convention deposit their instruments of ratification, acceptance, or approval. During this time, the membership to this convention grew, and hence the number of ratifications required increased as well, from 75, at that time, to 100 in 2014. Due to this, the IAEA had intensified its outreach by organising workshops and repeated calls for ratification at successive Nuclear Security Summits. The required number was reached on 8th April 2016, and the amendment entered into force thirty days after in May 2016.

List of countries that upon ratification declared that they do not consider themselves bound by dispute settlement procedures provided for in Article 17 paragraph 2
Country name	Accession date	Withdrawal date
Algeria	30 April 2003	-
Argentina	6 April 1989	-
Azerbaijan	19 January 2004	-
Bahamas	21 May 2008	-
Bahrain	10 May 2010	-
Belarus	9 September 1993	-
Bulgaria	10 April 1984	11 May 1994
China	10 January 1989	-
Cuba	26 September 1997	-
Cyprus	23 July 1998	-
El Salvador	15 December 2006	-
France	6 September 1991	-
Guatemala	23 April 1985	-
Hungary	4 May 1984	30 November 1989
India	12 March 2002	-
Indonesia	5 November 1986	-
Israel	22 January 2002	-
Jordan	7 September 2009	-
Korea	7 April 1982	-
Kuwait	23 April 2004	-
Lao	29 September 2010	-
Mongolia	28 May 1986	18 June 1990
Mozambique	3 March 2003	-
Myanmar	6 December 2016	-
Oman	11 June 2003	-
Pakistan	12 September 2000	-
Peru	11 January 1995	-
Poland	5 October 1983	18 June 1997
Qatar	9 March 2004	-
Romania	23 November 1993	-
Russia	25 May 1983	22 July 2007
Saint Lucia	14 September 2012	-
Saudi Arabia	7 January 2009	-
Singapore	22 September 2014	-
South Africa	17 September 2007	-
Spain	6 September 1991	-
Turkey	27 February 1985	-
Viet Nam	4 October 2012	–

The United States Department of State says that:

The Convention on the Physical Protection of Nuclear Material provides for certain levels of physical protection during international transport of nuclear material. It also establishes a general framework for cooperation among states in the protection, recovery, and return of stolen nuclear material. Further, the Convention lists certain serious offenses involving nuclear material which state parties are to make punishable and for which offenders shall be subject to a system of extradition or submission for prosecution.
