= World Nuclear University =

The World Nuclear University (WNU) is a network which was created in 2003 on the 50th anniversary of U.S. President Dwight D. Eisenhower's ‘Atoms for Peace’ initiative, and is recognized as a "Partnership for Sustainable Development" by the UN Commission on Sustainable Development (CSD).

The WNU is a not-for-profit organisation which runs a series of programmes throughout the world.

The majority of WNU programmes are designed for professionals already working within the nuclear industry, and the programmes aim to further the cause of the peaceful applications of nuclear technologies. Many are focussed on building leadership skills, and providing a broad perspective on the key topics in peaceful nuclear applications.

== WNU programmes ==
The major programmes offered by the World Nuclear University are:

=== Summer Institute ===
Run every year in July and August, this is the biggest event on the WNU calendar. The Summer Institute is an intensive six-week leadership development programme tailored specially to leaders in the industry. The programme is composed of lectures, invited leader presentations, small working group activities and a technical tour which combines to give participants a grounding in all aspects of the nuclear industry, with additional presentations focused on specific aspects of leadership. At the end of the programme, the Fellows work on their final projects, called Networks for Nuclear Innovation.

=== School of uranium production ===
The WNU School of Uranium production in collaboration with Diamo, from the Czech Republic. The programmes focus on all aspects of uranium production, from surveying and exploration, to extraction and ore processing, environmental and health protection and the decommissioning and rehabilitation of mining areas.

=== Short course ===
WNU also runs a number of short courses, held in collaboration with universities and research centres around the world. The courses are focused on "The World Nuclear Industry Today” and they are open to all interested participants. They are focused on improving knowledge of today's nuclear industry, and exploring where nuclear might go in future.

=== Nuclear Olympiad ===
The Nuclear Olympiad was held for the first time in 2011 in South Korea as a contest for university students around the world to research and develop a plan for gaining public acceptance of nuclear technology in their country. In 2015, 2016 and 2019 the Nuclear Olympiad engaged under-graduate and graduate students from around the world on the topic of nuclear applications for global development.

=== School on Radiation Technologies ===
The WNU School on Radiation Technologies is a two-week programme designed for promising young professionals working in radiation-related industries, research institutes and universities. Like the Summer Institute, this programme features lectures, group activities and technical visits.

=== Nuclear English ===
The WNU Nuclear English-language courses aims to prepare learners for the English-speaking environment, enabling day-to-day communication with colleagues, the writing of effective reports and participation at conferences. This course is designed for managers and senior technical staff working in the nuclear field.

== Structure ==
The WNU founding members include the World Nuclear Association, International Atomic Energy Agency (IAEA), World Association of Nuclear Operators (WANO) and the Organisation for Economic Co-operation and Development – Nuclear Energy Agency (OECD-NEA), that also compose the WNU Advisory Panel. The WNU is also supported by a substantial number of academic institutions and industry globally. The WNU is run from the WNU Coordinating Centre, hosted in the World Nuclear Association offices in London, UK.

The WNU President is Mrs Agneta Rising, World Nuclear Association Director General. The WNU's Chancellor is Dr Hans Blix, the IAEA's Director General-Emeritus, who headed that UN agency for 16 years and later served as chief of the UN Monitoring, Verification and Inspection Commission. The Head of WNU is Dr. Patricia Wieland.
