= Young Generation Network =

- Abbreviation: YGN
- Formation: 1996
- Founded at: United Kingdom
- Type: Professional network
- Purpose: Support and development of young nuclear professionals; knowledge transfer; outreach and careers promotion
- Headquarters: United Kingdom
- Region served: United Kingdom
- Members: Open to Nuclear Institute members under 37
- Chair: Lacey-Jo Marsland (2026)
- Parent organization: Nuclear Institute
- Website: www.nuclearinst.com/Young-Generation-Network

The Young Generation Network, or YGN, is a branch of the Nuclear Institute founded in 1996. It is a British version of the European Young Generation Network created earlier in Sweden by Jan Runermark, a president of ABB Atom who had been concerned with preserving the know-how of retiring nuclear-energy pioneers and who perceived a need for greater efforts to retain young professionals. The YGN, which is open to NI members under the age of 37, organizes lectures, speaking competitions, and facility tours for new nuclear workers in Great Britain. It also conducts its own lobbying efforts, serves as a source for journalists seeking information about the nuclear-industry labour market and promotes careers in science and engineering in schools, colleges and universities.

The UK's objectives are based on those established by the European Nuclear Societies, which are to:

- focus on the next generation
- promote knowledge in a wide perspective of the nuclear industry
- transfer the 'know-how' within generations
- provide a platform for:

- personal networks

- exchange of experience

- exchange of best practice across companies

- development of nuclear technology

- recruitment and job opportunities

- career development.

== Chairs ==
Former logo

- Michael Bray 2018
- Mike Roberts 2019
- Rob Ward 2020
- Hannah Paterson 2021
- Saralyn Thomas 2022
- Carwyn Chamberlain 2023
- Sarah D'Lima 2024
- Craig Pilkington 2025
- Lacey-Jo Marsland 2026

== Notes ==
- 1 YGN Aims
- 2 Objectives for a Young Generation Network
