= International Youth Nuclear Congress =

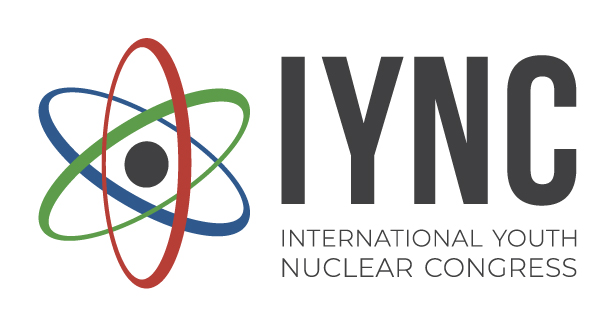
International Youth Nuclear Congress Logo

International Youth Nuclear Congress (IYNC) is a global non-profit organization connecting students and young professionals engaged in all areas of nuclear science and technology. IYNC was formally founded in April, 2000 during the first congress held in Bratislava, Slovakia.

The main goals of IYNC are:

- promotion of peaceful uses of nuclear science and technology
- communicating the benefits of nuclear technology to general public
- preservation and transfer of the existing knowledge and expertise from the current to the next generation of nuclear scientists and engineers

The main activity of IYNC is organization of biennial conferences for students and young professionals from different countries. In addition, IYNC coordinates and promotes networking, exchange of opinions and expertise among young professionals, facilitates establishment and supports activities of regional young generation networks that are in-line with IYNC goals.

== Mission ==
The IYNC official mission statement adopted at the first congress reads as follows:

We, as representatives of the new generation of professionals in the nuclear field agree to seize the opportunity of IYNC 2000 by creating an international network, the "International Youth Nuclear Congress", to

- Develop new approaches to communicate benefits of nuclear power, as part of a balanced energy mix.
- Promote further peaceful uses of nuclear science and technology for the welfare of mankind.
- Transfer knowledge from the current generation of leading scientists to the next generation and across international boundaries.
- Provide a platform and create an enabling environment to facilitate the building of professional networks that will open up future opportunities.

IYNC is a forum for presenting scientific, political, social and corporate opinions related to various aspects of nuclear technology for comprehensive discussion of the subject. IYNC promotes and encourages such broad and open discussion because this is the young generation of nuclear professionals who will put this technology to use and face its challenges in the future.

The list of subjects covered and discussed at IYNC include: design, construction, operation and safety of the existing and future nuclear energy systems, nuclear fuel cycle, nuclear chemistry and materials, thermal hydraulics, radiation science, technology and medical applications, policy, economics and human resources, nuclear fusion science and technology, as well as activities of young generation networks.

The IYNC slogan is: “Youth, Future, Nuclear”

== History ==
In the mid-1990s, the popularity of nuclear science and technology had been on a twenty-year decline. This fall in popularity resulted in a similar fall in new specialists entering the nuclear field. In comparison, most predictions of future energy requirements in a carbon-constrained world, clearly pointed that all available options should be pursued including nuclear energy.

This latter fact was recognized by a group of young nuclear professionals who initiated the idea of holding an International Youth Nuclear Congress (IYNC) in 1997. This idea was grounded in their belief that the efforts the young generation organizations were making in promoting the nuclear industry in individual countries would be more efficient and have more impact if integrated globally. Such global integration required the gathering together of people interested in collaborating within the nuclear field.

At the International Forum "Youth and the Plutonium Challenge" held in Obninsk, Russia in the summer of 1998, the participants confirmed once again their interest in holding the Congress and the first meeting to organize the event took place during the European Nuclear Congress in Nice, France in autumn of the same year. It was at this meeting the youth from Russia, France, the United States and Slovakia prepared and stated the mission of the IYNC.

The city of Bratislava, Slovakia was chosen as the location for the first congress. The Congress was supported by the representative organizations of the nuclear industry from around the world. This support gave the Congress the impetus to attract sponsorship from international organizations which in turn allowed it to bring together many international experts and young professionals from around the globe. The event required significant preparation and an executive committee was set up and held several preparatory meetings in Boston, US; Obninsk, Russia; and Bratislava, Slovakia.

The executive committee included representatives from different countries and different organizations who worked intensively over a period of two years. They invited young nuclear professionals from throughout the world to provide their opinions on the future of the nuclear industry and their ideas to stimulate both its growth and awakening interest in it. Many organizations responded and sent their young specialists to the Congress all of which enabled the committee to convert the dream of the congress into a reality.

At the first congress in Bratislava, a tradition was established for selecting the next congress location at international IYNC board meeting held at the conclusion of the current congress based on the prepared bids and presented by the interested potential host countries.

Since Bratislava, IYNC was held in the following locations:

- IYNC2002, Taejon, South Korea, 230 participants from 40 countries
- IYNC2004, Toronto, Canada, 290 participants, nearly 200 technical presentations
- IYNC2006, Stockholm, Sweden and Olkiluoto, Finland, more than 450 participants
- IYNC2008, Interlaken, Switzerland, over 330 participants from 30 countries
- IYNC2010, Cape Town, South Africa
- IYNC2012, Charlotte, North Carolina, US, over 600 participants from 32 countries
- IYNC2014, Burgos, Spain, over 350 participants from 34 countries
- IYNC2016, Hangzhou, China, 350 participants from 21 countries
- IYNC2018, San Carlos de Bariloche, Argentina, 420 participants from 37 countries
- IYNC2020, Sydney, Australia, 298 participants from 43 countries
- IYNC2022, Koriyama, Japan, 300 participants from 30 countries
- IYNC2024, Abu-Dhabi, United Arab Emirates, 350 participants from 47 countries

At IYNC 2004 in Toronto, formal steps were taken to create a legal framework for IYNC. Bylaws were adopted, officers were elected and the first official meeting of the board of directors took place. IYNC operates as a lean organization, with young professionals from around the world collaborating electronically and occasionally in person to further the goals of IYNC.

Besides congresses, IYNC has participated in European Nuclear Society - European Nuclear Young Generation Forum (ENGYF) held in Zagreb, Croatia, 2005, Amsterdam, The Netherlands, 2007, Córdoba, Spain, 2009, Prague, Czech Republic, 2011, Stockholm, Sweden, 2013, and Paris, France, 2015.

In the editions of 2008 and 2014, the IYNC hosted the ENEN, European Nuclear Education Network, PhD Event aiming to support the scientific research in nuclear fields. Awards were given to outstanding researchers, those winning in the competition format of the event.

Since the inception of IYNC, more people have begun to recognize the importance of nuclear energy in fighting climate change. IYNC has been a part of the nuclear resurgence over the last 10 years and continues to support young professionals in the nuclear industry.

== Structure ==
The organizational structure of IYNC is described in official bylaws.

=== Membership ===
IYNC does not have a fixed membership. It is generally intended that participants in IYNC will be young professionals and students having a professional and/or educational interest in the fields of nuclear science and technology. Participants are generally under age 35 or the age set for young generation membership by the nuclear society of their home country.

=== Governing ===
IYNC is governed by a board of directors consisting of one representative from each country referred to as "national representatives" involved with IYNC, in addition to up to 20 members at-large and elected officers. Members of the board of directors are elected for a two-year term.

The network president is elected at each congress by the outgoing members of the board of directors and performs general governing and network coordinating functions.

The current network president of IYNC is Benoît Erbacher (France). Past presidents are: Alexander Tsibulya (Russia), 2000–2006, Lisa Stiles (USA), 2006–2008, Hans Korteweg (Belgium), 2008–2010 and Miguel Millán (Spain) 2010–2012, Nicolas Anciaux (Belgium) 2012–2014, Melissa Crawford (US) 2014–2016, Denis Janin (France) 2016-2018, Luca Capriotti (Italy) 2018-2020, Lena Andriolo (France) 2020-2022, Kristine Madden (USA) 2022-2024.

=== National representation ===
Presently IYNC has representatives in following countries:

Argentina, Australia, Austria, Belarus, Belgium, Bolivia, Brasil, Canada, China, Croatia, Czech Republic, Finland, France, Germany, Ghana, Hungary, India, Israel, Italy, Korea, Kenya, Lithuania, Malaysia, Netherlands, Nigeria, Norway, Pakistan, Peru, Romania, Russia, Slovakia, Slovenia, South Africa, Spain, Sri Lanka, Sweden, Switzerland, Tanzania, Turkey, Ukraine, United Kingdom, United States
