= Minerals Council of Australia =

Australian industry body

- Predecessor: Australian Mining Industry Council
- Established: 1995
- Headquarters: Canberra
- Region served: Australia
- Chairman: Andrew Michelmore
- Chief Executive Officer: Tanis Constable
- Revenue: $29.8 million (2025)
- Expenses: $29.7 million (2025)
- Website: www.minerals.org.au

The Minerals Council of Australia (MCA) is an industry association representing companies involved in mining and mining services in Australia. It was established in 1995 as the successor to the Australian Mining Industry Council, which was founded in 1960. The organisation engages in policy development, advocacy, and public communication on issues affecting the Australian mining sector. As at December 2025, it had 86 full members and 52 associate members.

== Activities ==
In an effort to integrate sustainability concepts into the mining industry, members of the Council must release sustainability reports. Annual reports into the mining industry's safety and health performance data are published to encourage continuous improvement.

In March 2021, the MCA announced that Australia's minerals industry would introduce the Towards Sustainable Mining system, an accountability framework developed by the Mining Association of Canada. The MCA stated that the system would involve regular public reporting on safety, environmental and social indicators.

The Minerals Council is an associate member of FutureCoal. It has opposed climate movement campaigns seeking to persuade companies, universities and others to divest from coal and other fossil fuels.

=== Lobbying and advocacy ===
A 2020 report by InfluenceMap found the Minerals Council had the "single largest negative influence on Australian climate-related policy", a claim that MCA disputed. The Minerals Council spent $15.78 million on advertising opposing the Minerals Resource Rent Tax and Resources Super Profits Tax in 2010. The group spent close to $23 million in advertising during 2011 and 2012, then $1.67 million in the 2013 election year, and $60,000 in 2014. Three weeks before the 2015 Paris conference on climate change, the group launched a "coal is amazing" campaign. The campaign asserted that carbon capture and storage is "now a reality" despite only one facility operating in the world, and no plans to bring facilities online in Australia until the 2020s. In the 2015 budget, the Abbott Government cut $460 million from CCS projects.

In 2024, the MCA argued that Australia is missing out on $68 billion a year in foreign investment due to the longer lead times for mining developments compared to South-East Asia and the United States. The mining sector was calling for faster approvals for critical minerals projects, while the Australian Conservation Foundation supported a faster decision-making process but called for stronger protections for biodiversity and First Nations culture and heritage. The MCA has also supported the continuation of Australia's Fuel Tax Credit scheme through the Fuel Tax Credit Alliance's Road Taxes are for Road Users campaign.

In July 2024, the MCA published 30 Things, a set of educational resources about uses of minerals in modern life, technology and business.

== Governance ==
The Minerals Council of Australia is governed by a board of directors. As of 2025, Andrew Michelmore was listed by the MCA as its chairman and Tania Constable was listed as Chief Executive Officer.

== Position on nuclear energy ==
The MCA supports the inclusion of nuclear power in Australia's energy mix and has called for changes to legislation that prohibits civilian nuclear power generation in Australia. In June 2024, the MCA endorsed the Coalition's nuclear energy policy and said that nuclear power should complement renewable energy generation.

== See also ==
- Australian Chamber of Commerce and Industry
- NSW Minerals Council
