= American Nuclear Society =

U.S.-based nonprofit organization

- Established: 1954; 72 years ago
- Type: professional organization
- Legal status: 501(c)(3) non-profit organization
- Headquarters: Westmont, Illinois, U.S.
- Region served: Worldwide
- Fields: Nuclear power
- Members: >10,000 (2023)
- President: Lisa Marshall
- Immediate Past President: Kenneth Petersen
- Vice President: H.M. Hashemian
- Executive Director/CEO: Craig Piercy
- Publication: Nuclear News
- Affiliations: INSC
- Website: www.ans.org

The American Nuclear Society (ANS) is an international, not-for-profit organization of scientists, engineers, and industry professionals that promote the field of nuclear engineering and related disciplines.

ANS is composed of three communities: professional divisions, local sections/plant branches, and student sections. Individual members consist of fellows, professional members, and student members. Various organization members are also included in the Society including corporations, governmental agencies, educational institutions, and associations.

As of spring 2024, ANS is composed of more than 10,000 members from more than 40 countries. ANS is also a member of the International Nuclear Societies Council (INSC).

Professional Divisions within the American Nuclear Society focus on specific technical domains, encompassing 18 areas and the Young Members Group. They provide members with specialized engagement opportunities in nuclear science and technology. ANS members can join any number of these divisions. Their activities are coordinated by the Professional Divisions Committee. Topics covered by the divisions range from Accelerator Applications to Fusion Energy and more.

The main objectives of ANS are to provide professional development opportunities for members, engage and inform the public and students about the benefits of nuclear technology, encourage innovation in the nuclear field, and advocate effectively for nuclear technology at both domestic and international levels.

== History ==
The American Nuclear Society was founded in 1954 as a not-for-profit association to promote the growing nuclear field. Shortly thereafter in 1955, ANS held its first annual meeting and elected Walter Zinn as its first president. Originally headquartered in space provided by the Oak Ridge Institute of Nuclear Studies (ORINS), the Society's headquarters were moved to various locations over the years until 1977, when the Society settled into its own building in La Grange Park, Illinois. Since 2024, the Society has been headquartered in Westmont, Illinois.

The American Nuclear Society published "Fusion technology: a journal of the American Nuclear Society and the European Nuclear Society" from 1984 to 2001.

== Divisions ==
- Accelerator Applications
- Aerospace Nuclear Science & Technology
- Decommissioning & Environmental Sciences
- Education, Training & Workforce Development
- Fuel Cycle & Waste Management
- Fusion Energy
- Human Factors, Instrumentation & Controls
- Isotopes & Radiation
- Materials Science & Technology
- Mathematics & Computation
- Nuclear Criticality Safety
- Nuclear Installations Safety
- Nuclear Nonproliferation Policy
- Operations & Power
- Radiation Protection & Shielding
- Reactor Physics
- Robotics & Remote Systems
- Thermal Hydraulics
- Young Members Group

== Publications ==
The American Nuclear Society publishes various journals, magazines, newsletters, and books.

- Nuclear News
- Radwaste Solutions
- Nuclear Science and Engineering
- Nuclear Technology
- Fusion Science and Technology
- Nuclear Newswire

== Student sections ==
The American Nuclear Society consists of student sections at colleges and universities throughout the United States and abroad. As of spring 2020, the table below lists the active student sections of ANS.

University, college	State, country	Ref(s)
Air Force Institute of Technology	Ohio, US	
Brigham Young University	Utah, US	
Chattanooga State Community College	Tennessee, US	
City College of New York	New York, US	
Colorado School of Mines	Colorado, US	
Excelsior College	New York, US	
Florida International University	Florida, US	
Georgia Tech	Georgia, US	
Idaho State University	Idaho, US	
Iowa State University	Iowa, US	
Kansas State University	Kansas, US	
Kennesaw State University	Georgia, US	
King Abdulaziz University	Saudi Arabia	
Louisiana State University	Louisiana, US	
Massachusetts Institute of Technology	Massachusetts, US	
Missouri University of Science and Technology	Missouri, US	
New Mexico State University	New Mexico, US	
North Carolina State University	North Carolina, US	
Ohio State University	Ohio, US	
Oregon State University	Oregon, US	
Pennsylvania State University	Pennsylvania, US	
Purdue University	Indiana, US	
Rensselaer Polytechnic Institute	New York, US	
South Carolina State University	South Carolina, US	
Stevens Institute of Technology	New Jersey, US	
Texas A&M University	Texas, US	
Texas A&M University–Kingsville	Texas, US	
Three Rivers Community College	Connecticut, US	
United States Military Academy	New York, US	
United States Naval Academy	Maryland, US	
University of California, Berkeley	California, US	
University of California, Irvine	California, US	
University of Florida	Florida, US	
University of Idaho	Idaho, US	
University of Illinois at Urbana–Champaign	Illinois, US	
University of Maryland	Maryland, US	
University of Massachusetts Lowell	Massachusetts, US	
University of Michigan	Michigan, US	
University of Missouri	Missouri, US	
University of Nevada, Las Vegas	Nevada, US	
University of Nevada, Reno	Nevada, US	
University of New Mexico	New Mexico, US	
University of Pittsburgh	Pennsylvania, US	
University of Puerto Rico at Mayagüez	Puerto Rico	
University of Sharjah	United Arab Emirates	
University of South Carolina	South Carolina, US	
University of Tennessee	Tennessee, US	
University of Texas at Arlington	Texas, US	
University of Texas at Austin	Texas, US	
University of Texas of the Permian Basin	Texas, US	
University of Utah	Utah, US	
University of Wisconsin–Madison	Wisconsin, US	
Utah State University	Utah, US	
Vanderbilt University	Tennessee, US	
Virginia Commonwealth University	Virginia, US	
Virginia Tech	Virginia, US	

== Local sections ==
Throughout the US and the world, numerous Local sections constitute the foundation of ANS. Members are encouraged to affiliate with a Local Section or Plant Branch to expand their professional connections and contribute to public education and outreach in the nuclear sector.

Local section name	Direct link	Chair	Comment
Arizona Local Section	link	Dr. John E. Kelly	-
Austria Local Section	-	-	Revitalizing
Beaver Valley Plant Branch	-	Mr. Daniel J. Ronnenberg	Inactive
Carlsbad Local Section	link	Dr. Joshua L. Vajda, PE, CHP	-
Central Illinois Local Section	-	Dr. Rizwan Uddin	Includes parts of IL, IN; revitalizing
Chattanooga Local Section	-	-	Revitalizing
Chicago Local Section	link	Mr. Eric Jebsen, PE	Includes parts of IL, IN
Colorado Local Section	link	-	Revitalizing
Columbia (South Carolina) Local Section	link	Mr. Luke Olson	-
Connecticut Local Section	-	-	Revitalizing
North Carolina Local Section	link	-	Revitalizing
Eastern Washington Local Section	link	Ms. Consuelo Guzman-Leong, PE	-
Florida Local Section	link	Prof. Sedat Goluoglu	Inactive
French Local Section	link	Dr. Bertrand Morel	-
Georgia Local Section	link	Mr. Juan F. Villarreal	-
Idaho Local Section	link	Ms. Johanna H. Oxstrand	Includes parts of ID, MT, UT, WY
India Local Section	link	Dr. Suneet Singh	-
Japan Local Section	link	Prof. Kenichi Ishikawa	-
Kansas Local Section	link	Mr. Ryan T. Kinney, PE	-
Latin American Local Section	link	Mr. Joao Da Silva Goncalves	-
Long Island, New York Local Section	link	Ms. Deana L. Buckallew	-
Louisiana Local Section	link	Mr. Jerrod Ewing	-
Michigan - Ohio Local Section	link	Mr. Randall Dean Westmoreland	Includes parts of MI, OH
Mississippi Local Section	link	Mrs. Earnestine M. Johnson-Turnipseed	-
Nevada Local Section	link	Mr. Ronald G. Fraass	-
New York Metropolitan Local Section	-	Mr. Daniel Carleton	Revitalizing
Niagara Finger Lakes Local Section	link	-	Inactive
Northeastern Local Section	link	Mrs. Christine H. Roy, PE	Includes parts of MA, ME, NH, RI, VT
Northeastern New York Local Section	link	Mr. Kevin Boreen	-
Northern California Local Section	link	-	-
Oak Ridge/Knoxville Local Section	link	Dr. Erik D. Walker	Includes parts of KY and TN
Perry Plant Branch	-	Mr. James H. Mangle, PE	Inactive
Piedmont Carolinas Local Section	link	Mr. Ryan K. Brookhart, PE	Includes parts of NC, SC
Pittsburgh Local Section	link	Mr. Timothy M. Lloyd, PE	-
Pocatello Plant Branch (Plant Branch)	-	-	-
San Diego Local Section	link	Ms. Katherine E. Partain	-
Savannah River Local Section	link	Dr. Kevin R. O'Kula	-
Southeast Florida Local Section	-	Dr. David F. Roelant	Revitalizing
Taiwan Local Section	-	Yung-Hui Hsu	-
Trinity Local Section	link	Mr. John L. Bliss	-
United Arab Emirates Local Section	-	Dr. Walid A. Metwally	-
Virginia Local Section	link	Mr. David Keegan	Includes parts of VA and WV
Washington, D.C. Local Section	link	Mr. James W. Behrens	Includes parts of DC, MD, VA
Wilmington Area Local Section	link	Mr. Matthew Mann	Includes parts of NC and SC
Wisconsin Local Section	link	Dr. Ross F. Radel, PE	-

== See also ==
- Alpha Nu Sigma
- Institute of Nuclear Materials Management
- Nuclear Energy Institute
- Guy Tavernier (fr)
- J. Ernest Wilkins, Jr.
- Margaret K. Butler
- European Nuclear Society
