= Breakthrough Institute =

Environmental research center in Berkeley, California, United States

- Formation: circa 2003
- Founder: Michael Shellenberger; Ted Nordhaus
- Purpose: Environmental research
- Headquarters: Berkeley, CA
- Location: 2054 University Ave, Berkeley, California 94704, United States
- Key people: Ted Nordhaus (Founder, executive director), Alex Trembath (Deputy director), Kathryn Salam (Executive editor)
- Website: thebreakthrough.org

The Breakthrough Institute is an environmental research center located in Berkeley, California. Founded in 2007 by Michael Shellenberger and Ted Nordhaus, the institute is aligned with ecomodernist philosophy. The Institute advocates for an embrace of modernization and technological development (including nuclear power and carbon capture) in order to address environmental challenges. Proposing urbanization, agricultural intensification, nuclear power, aquaculture, and desalination as processes with a potential to reduce human demands on the environment, allowing more room for non-human species.

Since its inception, competing environmental scientists and academics have criticized Breakthrough's environmental positions. Popular press reception of Breakthrough's environmental ideas and policy has been mixed.

== Organization, funding and people ==
The Breakthrough institute is registered as 501(c)(3) nonprofit organization and is supported by various public institutions and individuals.

Breakthrough's executive director is Ted Nordhaus. Others associated with Breakthrough include former National Review executive editor Reihan Salam, journalist Gwyneth Cravens, political scientist Roger A. Pielke Jr., sociologist Steve Fuller, and environmentalist Stewart Brand.

Nordhaus and Shellenberger have written on the subjects ranging from positive treatment of nuclear energy and shale gas to critiques of the planetary boundaries hypothesis. The Breakthrough Institute has argued that climate policy should be focused on higher levels of public funding on technology innovation to "make clean energy cheap", and has been critical of climate policies such as cap and trade and carbon pricing.

== Programs and philosophy ==
Breakthrough Institute maintains programs in energy, conservation, and food. Their website states that the energy research is “focused on making clean energy cheap through technology innovation to deal with both global warming and energy poverty.” The conservation work “seeks to offer pragmatic new frameworks and tools for navigating" the challenges of the Anthropocene, offering up nuclear energy, synthetic fertilizers, and genetically modified foods as solutions.

Jonathan Symons, Senior Lecturer at Macquarie University, Australia, has written an extensive survey of the Breakthrough Institute and its philosophy. He argues that ecomodernism is best understood as a social democratic response to environmental challenges, and that the Breakthrough Institute's argument for state investment in development and deployment of zero carbon technologies aligns with the IPCC's position that new technologies are crucial to avoiding dangerous climate change.

== Criticism ==
Scholars such as Professor of American and Environmental Studies Julie Sze and environmental humanist Michael Ziser criticize Breakthrough's philosophy as one that believes "community-based environmental justice poses a threat to the smooth operation of a highly capitalized, global-scale Environmentalism." Further, Environmental and Art Historian TJ Demos has argued that Breakthrough's ideas present "nothing more than a bad utopian fantasy" that function to support the oil and gas industry and work as "an apology for nuclear energy."

Journalist Paul D. Thacker alleged that the Breakthrough Institute is an example of a think tank which lacks intellectual rigour, promoting contrarianist reasoning and cherry picking evidence.

The institute has also been criticized for promoting industrial agriculture and processed foodstuffs while also accepting donations from the Nathan Cummings Foundation, whose board members have financial ties to processed food companies that rely heavily on industrial agriculture. After an IRS complaint about potential improper use of 501(c)(3) status, the Institute no longer lists the Nathan Cummings Foundation as a donor. However, as Thacker has noted, the institute's funding remains largely opaque.

Climate scientist Michael E. Mann also questions the motives of the Breakthrough Institute. According to Mann, the self-declared mission of the BTI is to look for a breakthrough to solve the climate problem. However Mann states that basically the BTI "appears to be opposed to anything - be it a price on carbon or incentives for renewable energy - that would have a meaningful impact." He notes that the BTI "remains curiously preoccupied with opposing advocates for meaningful climate action and is coincidentally linked to natural gas interests" and criticises the BTI for advocating "continued exploitation of fossil fuels." Mann also questions that the BTI on the one hand seems to be "very pessimistic" about renewable energy, while on the other hand "they are extreme techno-optimists" regarding geoengineering.

== Publications ==
=== "The Death of Environmentalism: Global Warming in a Post-Environmental World" ===
In 2004, Breakthrough founders Ted Nordhaus and Michael Shellenberger coauthored the essay, “Death of Environmentalism: Global Warming Politics in a Post-Environmental World.” The paper argued that environmentalism is incapable of dealing with climate change and should "die" so that a new politics can be born.

The paper was criticized by members of the mainstream environmental movement. Former Sierra Club Executive Director Carl Pope called the essay "unclear, unfair and divisive." He said it contained multiple factual errors and misinterpretations. However, former Sierra Club President Adam Werbach praised the authors' arguments. Former Greenpeace Executive Director John Passacantando said in 2005, referring to both Shellenberger and his coauthor Ted Nordhaus, "These guys laid out some fascinating data, but they put it in this over-the-top language and did it in this in-your-face way." Michel Gelobter and other environmental experts and academics wrote The Soul of Environmentalism: Rediscovering transformational politics in the 21st century in response, criticizing "Death" for demanding increased technological innovation rather than addressing the systemic concerns of people of color.

Writing in The New York Times, Matthew Yglesias said in 2008 that "Nordhaus and Shellenberger persuasively argue, environmentalists must stop congratulating themselves for their own willingness to confront inconvenient truths and must focus on building a politics of shared hope rather than relying on a politics of fear.", adding that the paper "is more convincing in its case for a change in rhetoric."

=== Break Through: From the Death of Environmentalism to the Politics of Possibility ===
In 2007, Nordhaus and Shellenberger published their book Break Through: From the Death of Environmentalism to the Politics of Possibility. The book argues for a "post-environmental" politics that abandons the environmentalist focus on nature protection for a new focus on technological innovation to create a new, stronger U.S. economy.

The Wall Street Journal wrote that, "If heeded, Nordhaus and Shellenberger's call for an optimistic outlook—embracing economic dynamism and creative potential—will surely do more for the environment than any U.N. report or Nobel Prize." NPR's science correspondent Richard Harris listed Break Through on his "recommended reading list" for climate change.

However, Julie Sze and Michael Ziser argued that Break Through continued the trend Gelobter pointed out related the authors' commitment to technological innovation and economic growth instead of focusing on systemic inequalities that create environmental injustices. Specifically Sze and Ziser argue that Nordhaus and Shellenberger's "evident relish in their notoriety as the 'sexy' cosmopolitan 'bad boys' of environmentalism (their own words) introduces some doubt about their sincerity and reliability." The authors asserted that Shellenberger's work fails "to incorporate the aims of environmental justice while actively trading on suspect political tropes," such as blaming China and other Nations as large-scale polluters so that the United States may begin and continue Nationalistic technology-based research-and-development environmentalism, while continuing to emit more greenhouse gases than most other nations. In turn, Shellenberger and Nordhaus seek to move away from proven Environmental Justice tactics, "calling for a moratorium" on "community organizing." Such technology-based "approaches like those of Nordhaus and Shellenberger miss entirely" the "structural environmental injustice" that natural disasters like Hurricane Katrina make visible.

Joseph Romm, a former US Department of Energy official now with the Center for American Progress, argued that "Pollution limits are far, far more important than R&D for what really matters -- reducing greenhouse-gas emissions and driving clean technologies into the marketplace." Environmental journalist David Roberts, writing in Grist, stated that while the BTI and its founders garner much attention, their policy is lacking, and ultimately they "receive a degree of press coverage that wildly exceeds their intellectual contributions." Reviewers for the San Francisco Chronicle, the American Prospect, and the Harvard Law Review argued that a critical reevaluation of green politics was unwarranted because global warming had become a high-profile issue and the Democratic Congress was preparing to act.

=== "An Ecomodernist Manifesto" ===
In April 2015, "An Ecomodernist Manifesto" was issued by John Asafu-Adjaye, Linus Blomqvist, Stewart Brand, Barry Brook. Ruth DeFries, Erle Ellis, Christopher Foreman, David Keith, Martin Lewis, Mark Lynas, Ted Nordhaus, Roger A. Pielke, Jr., Rachel Pritzker, Joyashree Roy, Mark Sagoff, Michael Shellenberger, Robert Stone, and Peter Teague. It proposed dropping the goal of “sustainable development” and replacing it with a strategy to shrink humanity's footprint by using natural resources more intensively through technological innovation. The authors argue that economic development is necessary to preserve the environment.

According to The New Yorker, "most of the criticism of [the Manifesto] was more about tone than content. The manifesto's basic arguments, after all, are hardly radical. To wit: technology, thoughtfully applied, can reduce the suffering, human and otherwise, caused by climate change; ideology, stubbornly upheld, can accomplish the opposite." At The New York Times, Eduardo Porter wrote approvingly of ecomodernism's alternative approach to sustainable development. In an article titled "Manifesto Calls for an End to 'People Are Bad' Environmentalism", Slate's Eric Holthaus wrote "It's inclusive, it's exciting, and it gives environmentalists something to fight for for a change." The science journal Nature editorialized the manifesto.

The Manifesto was met with critiques similar to Gelobter's evaluation of "Death" and Sze and Ziser's analysis of Break Through. Environmental historian Jeremy Caradonna and environmental economist Richard B. Norgaard led a group of environmental scholars in a critique, arguing that Ecomodernism as presented in the Manifesto "violates everything we know about ecosystems, energy, population, and natural resources," and "Far from being an ecological statement of principles, the Manifesto merely rehashes the naïve belief that technology will save us and that human ingenuity can never fail." Further, "The Manifesto suffers from factual errors and misleading statements."

T.J. Demos agreed with Caradonna, and wrote in 2017 that "What is additionally striking about the Ecomodernist document, beyond its factual weaknesses and ecological falsehoods, is that there is no mention of social justice or democratic politics," and "no acknowledgement of the fact that big technologies like nuclear reinforce centralized power, the military-industrial complex, and the inequalities of corporate globalization."

== Breakthrough Journal ==
In 2011, Breakthrough published the first issue of the Breakthrough Journal, which aims to "modernize political thought for the 21st century". The New Republic called Breakthrough Journal "among the most complete efforts to provide a fresh answer to" the question of how to modernize liberal thought, and the National Review called it "the most promising effort at self-criticism by our liberal cousins in a long time".
