= Apocalypse Never =

2020 book by Michael Shellenberger

Apocalypse Never: Why Environmental Alarmism Hurts Us All
- First edition
- Author: Michael Shellenberger
- Publisher: HarperCollins
- Publication date: 30 June 2020
- Pages: 272
- ISBN: 0063001691 (Hardcover)

Apocalypse Never: Why Environmental Alarmism Hurts Us All is a 2020 book by Michael Shellenberger. The book argues that climate change and related environmental issues are widely overstated by activists and the media, and that the resulting "alarmism" undermines public support for the policies Shellenberger favors—primarily nuclear power and economic growth. Across the twelve chapters, Shellenberger contends that climate change is not an existential threat, that the Amazon is not collapsing, that a sixth mass extinction is not underway, and that market forces (not activism) have protected whales and reduced pollution.

The book received endorsements from a small number of scientists but was broadly criticized by fact-checkers and climate experts. Reviews by Snopes, Climate Feedback, RealClimate, and Yale Climate Connections found that Shellenberger frequently cherry-picks data, misrepresents the findings of cited studies, and sets up strawman arguments. Several scientists whose work he references publicly disputed his use of their research. Critics argue that while pushing back against environmental exaggeration can be useful, downplaying genuine climate risks is counterproductive.

== Summary ==
Shellenberger frames his book as a correction to what he claims as environmental alarmism, arguing that climate change and related environmental issues are overstated and that environmental activists oppose the solutions he favors (nuclear energy and economic growth) which will remedy environmental issues. According to Shellenberger, the book "explores how and why so many of us came to see important but manageable environmental problems as the end of the world, and why the people who are the most apocalyptic about environmental problems tend to oppose the best and most obvious solutions to solving them."

Shellenberger initially teased the book in a Forbes op-ed titled "On Behalf Of Environmentalists, I Apologize For The Climate Scare", later removed, Shellenberger claimed due to censorship, but Forbes claiming due to violations of editorial guidelines against self-promotion. Fact checkers pointed out the article contained "a mix of accurate, misleading, and patently false statements." and Snopes noted that authors of many cited studies said their work "either refutes or is irrelevant to the broader points Shellenberger makes in his book."

== Reception ==
=== Prior to publication ===
Before publication, the book received favorable reviews from climate scientists Tom Wigley and Kerry Emanuel, and from environmentalists such as Steve McCormick and Erle Ellis, but reviews after publication were mixed. For example, Emanuel said that while he did not regret his original positive review, he wished that "the book did not carry with it its own excesses and harmful baggage."

=== Positive ===
The book has received positive reviews and coverage from conservative and libertarian news outlets and organizations, including Fox News, the Heartland Institute, the Daily Mail, Reason, The Wall Street Journal, National Review, and "climate 'truther' websites".

In National Review, Alex Trembath, then deputy director of the Breakthrough Institute, generally praised the book, writing that "despite the flaws", "Shellenberger ... do[es] a service in calling out the environmental alarmism and hysteria that obscure environmental debates rather than illuminate them. And they stand as outliers in those debates for precisely the reason that they claim: Abjuring environmentalist orthodoxy carries heavy social and professional penalties, so few are willing to do so." However, Trembath criticized some of the book as "nuclear fetishism".

In The Wall Street Journal, John Tierney, a long-standing critic of environmentalism, wrote that "Shellenberger makes a persuasive case, lucidly blending research data and policy analysis with a history of the green movement and vignettes of people in poor countries suffering the consequences of 'environmental colonialism.'" In the Financial Times, Jonathan Ford wrote that the book "provide[s] a corrective to many of the green assumptions that dominate the media. And if they make the world a little more questioning of the next polar bear story, that is no bad thing."

In Scientific American, John Horgan said that "Apocalypse Never will make some green progressives mad. But I see it as a useful and even necessary counterpoint to the alarmism being peddled by some activists and journalists, including me." Horgan criticized the book for arguing too "aggressively for nuclear power" and added that "my main gripe with Shellenberger isn't that he's too optimistic; it's that he's not optimistic enough." The book received a positive review from Die Welt.

=== Negative ===
Reviewing Apocalypse Never for Yale Climate Connections, environmental scientist Peter Gleick argued that "bad science and bad arguments abound" in Apocalypse Never, writing that "What is new in here isn't right, and what is right isn't new." Gleick criticizes Shellenberger for using flawed arguments to dismiss the threat of species extinctions due to climate change, saying that Shellenberger confuses the concept of species richness with biodiversity, and that he misunderstood the study that he cites. Gleick claims that Shellenberger uses a set of logical fallacies, misrepresentation, and selective use of evidence in his book. He complains that Shellenberger used cherrypicking of events and out-of-date research in arguing that people were wrong to say that recent extreme events like forest fires, floods, heat waves, and droughts, were worsened by climate change. According to Gleick, Shellenberger ignored an increasing abundance of literature that shows strong links between climate change and worsening of extreme events, including hurricanes, heat deaths, flooding and decreasing ice.

In the Los Angeles Review of Books, environmental economist Sam Bliss wrote that "the book itself is well written", but that Shellenberger "plays fast and loose with the facts". Furthermore, "...he seems more concerned with showing climate-denying conservatives clever new ways to own the libs than with convincing environmentalists of anything." Writing in the conservative journal The New Atlantis, social scientists Taylor Dotson and Michael Bouchey argued that, as an "environmental activist" and ecomodernist, Shellenberger's writing in his books and on his foundation's website "bombards readers with facts that are disconnected, out of context, poorly explained, and of questionable relevance", and that ultimately, his "fanatic, scientistic discourse stands in the way of nuclear energy policy that is both intelligent and democratic."
