= Mark Lynas =

British author and journalist (born 1973)

- Mark Lynas, 2012
- Born: 1973 (age 52–53); Fiji
- Occupations: Journalist, author, environmentalist
- Writing career
- Language: English
- Mark Lynas' voice Recorded September 2017
- Website: marklynas.org

Mark Lynas (born 1973) is a British author and journalist whose work is focused on environmentalism and climate change. He has written for the New Statesman, The Ecologist, Granta and Geographical magazines, and The Guardian and The Observer newspapers in the UK, as well as The New York Times and The Washington Post in the United States; he also worked on and appeared in the film The Age of Stupid. He was born in Fiji, grew up in Peru, Spain and the United Kingdom and holds a degree in history and politics from the University of Edinburgh. He has published several books including Six Degrees: Our Future on a Hotter Planet (2007) and The God Species: Saving the Planet in the Age of Humans (2011).

Lynas believes climate change has the potential to end civilisation and argues that we are on our "final warning". Lynas is research and climate lead for the Alliance for Science. Since 2009 he has been climate advisor to former president of the Maldives Mohamed Nasheed (with whom he appears in the 2011 documentary film The Island President), and he currently works to assist Nasheed with the Climate Vulnerable Forum, a group of the world's most climate-vulnerable 58 developing countries. He has co-authored a number of peer-reviewed scientific publications, including a 2021 paper which found that the consensus on anthropogenic climate change in the scholarly literature now exceeds 99%.

== Main work and publications ==
In 2004, Lynas' High Tide: The Truth About Our Climate Crisis was published by Macmillan Publishers on its Picador imprint. He has also contributed to a book entitled Fragile Earth: Views of a Changing World published by Collins, which presents before-and-after images of some of the changes which have happened to the world in recent years, including the Indian Ocean tsunami and Hurricane Katrina, alongside a bleak look at the effects of mankind's actions on the planet.

In January 2007, Lynas published Gem Carbon Counter, containing instructions to calculate people's personal carbon emissions and recommendations about how to reduce their impact on the atmosphere.

In 2007, he published Six Degrees: Our Future on a Hotter Planet, a book detailing the progressive effect of global warming in several planetary ecosystems, from 1 degree to 6 degrees and further of average temperature rise of the planet. Special coverage is given to the positive feedback mechanisms that could dramatically accelerate the climate change, possibly putting the climate on a runaway path. As a possible end scenario the release of methane hydrate from the bottom of the oceans could replicate the end-Permian extinction event. This book won the Royal Society's science book of the year award in 2008.

In 2008, National Geographic released a documentary film based on Lynas's book, entitled Six Degrees Could Change the World.

In 2010, Lynas published an article in the New Statesman entitled "Why We Greens Keep Getting It Wrong" and the same year was the main contributor to a UK Channel 4 Television programme called "What the Green Movement Got Wrong". In these he explained that he now felt that several of his previous strongly held beliefs were wrong. For example, he suggested that opposition by environmentalists, such as himself, to the development of nuclear energy had speeded up climate change, and that GM crops were necessary to feed the world.

This latter position was attacked as patronising and naive by some developing world commentators, including one featured in a Channel Four debate after the programme aired. A number of experts also criticised Lynas's factual errors in contributing to the film. British environmentalist George Monbiot wrote in the Guardian that '[Stewart] Brand and Lynas present themselves as heretics. But their convenient fictions chime with the thinking of the new establishment: corporations, thinktanks, neoliberal politicians. The true heretics are those who remind us that neither social nor environmental progress are possible unless power is confronted.' Since writing this, George Monbiot is no longer opposed to nuclear power as an alternative to more polluting sources such as coal and has himself written a book about alternative proteins and meat substitutes many of which require high-tech genetics.

In July 2011, Lynas published in the U.K. the book entitled The God Species: How the Planet Can Survive the Age of Humans. It was also published in the U.S. by National Geographic in October 2011 as The God Species: Saving the Planet in the Age of Humans. Lynas argues that as Earth has entered the Anthropocene, and as such humanity is changing the planet's climate, its bio-geochemical cycles, the chemistry of the oceans and the colour of the sky, as well as reducing the number of species. Based on the planetary boundaries concept, he proposes several strategies that are controversial among the environmental community, such as using nuclear power and the Integral fast reactor to reduce carbon emissions and geoengineering to mitigate inevitable global warming; or genetic engineering (transgenics) to feed the world and reduce the environmental impact of agriculture. In 2012, Mark Lynas was bestowed the Paradigm Award by the Breakthrough Institute in recognition of his intellectual leadership on the Anthropocene.

=== "In Defence of Nuclear Power" ===
In January 2012, Lynas published an article titled "In Defence of Nuclear Power", in which he states that "nuclear provides the vast majority of the UK's current low-carbon electricity – as much as 70%, whilst avoiding the emission of 40 million tonnes of carbon dioxide per year. This is why I want to see more nuclear power in the UK and elsewhere, in order to avoid more carbon emissions". In September 2012, Lynas wrote a follow-up article in The Guardian entitled "Without Nuclear, the Battle Against Global Warming Is as Good as Lost".

In 2013, Lynas published Nuclear 2.0: Why A Green Future Needs Nuclear Power. Lynas is featured in the 2013 pro-nuclear documentary film Pandora's Promise. Generation IV reactor research programs are developing the type of nuclear power described in Pandora's Promise.

=== Conversion to support GMOs ===
In a January 2013 lecture to the Oxford Farming Conference, Lynas detailed his conversion from an organizer of the anti-GMO food movement in Europe to becoming a supporter of the technology. He apologized for engaging in vandalism of field trials of genetically engineered crops, stating that "anti-science environmentalism became increasingly inconsistent with my pro-science environmentalism with regard to climate change". Lynas criticized environmental organizations, including Greenpeace and organic trade groups like the U.K. Soil Association, for ignoring scientific facts about genetically modified crop safety and benefits because it conflicted with their ideologies and stated that he "was completely wrong to oppose GMOs".

=== "An Ecomodernist Manifesto" ===
In April 2015, Lynas joined with a group of scholars in issuing "An Ecomodernist Manifesto". The other authors were: John Asafu-Adjaye, Linus Blomqvist, Stewart Brand, Barry Brook. Ruth DeFries, Erle Ellis, Christopher Foreman, David Keith, Martin Lewis, Ted Nordhaus, Roger A. Pielke, Jr., Rachel Pritzker, Joyashree Roy, Mark Sagoff, Michael Shellenberger, Robert Stone, and Peter Teague

=== Appearances ===
In 2017, Lynas appeared at the 17th European Skeptics Congress (ESC) in Old Town Wrocław, Poland. This congress was organised by the Klub Sceptyków Polskich (Polish Skeptics Club) and Český klub skeptiků Sisyfos (Czech Skeptic's Club). Lynas was a speaker there, along with Marcin Rotkiewicz and Tomáš Moravec, on the topic of genetically modified organisms.

== Bibliography ==
=== Books ===
- High Tide: The Truth About Our Climate Crisis (2004). Picador. ISBN 978-0312303655 (384 pages).
- Six Degrees: Our Future on a Hotter Planet (2007; 2008 in US). ISBN 978-0007209057 (358 pages).
- Carbon Counter (2010). Collins. ISBN 978-0007248124 (192 pages).
- The God Species: Saving the Planet in the Age of Humans (2011). National Geographic. ISBN 978-1426208911 (288 pages).
- Nuclear 2.0: Why a Green Future Needs Nuclear Power (2013). ISBN 978-1906860233 (112 pages).
- Seeds of Science: How We Got It Wrong on GMOs (2018). ISBN 978-1472946959.
- Our Final Warning: Six Degrees of Climate Emergency (2020). ISBN 978-0008308551
- Six Minutes to Winter: Nuclear War and How to Avoid It (2025). ISBN 978-1399410519

=== Essays and reporting ===
- Lynas, Mark (February–March 2014). "Environmentalists' double standards". Special Feature. Food Wars. Cosmos. 55: 49.
