= Ruth DeFries =

American geographer

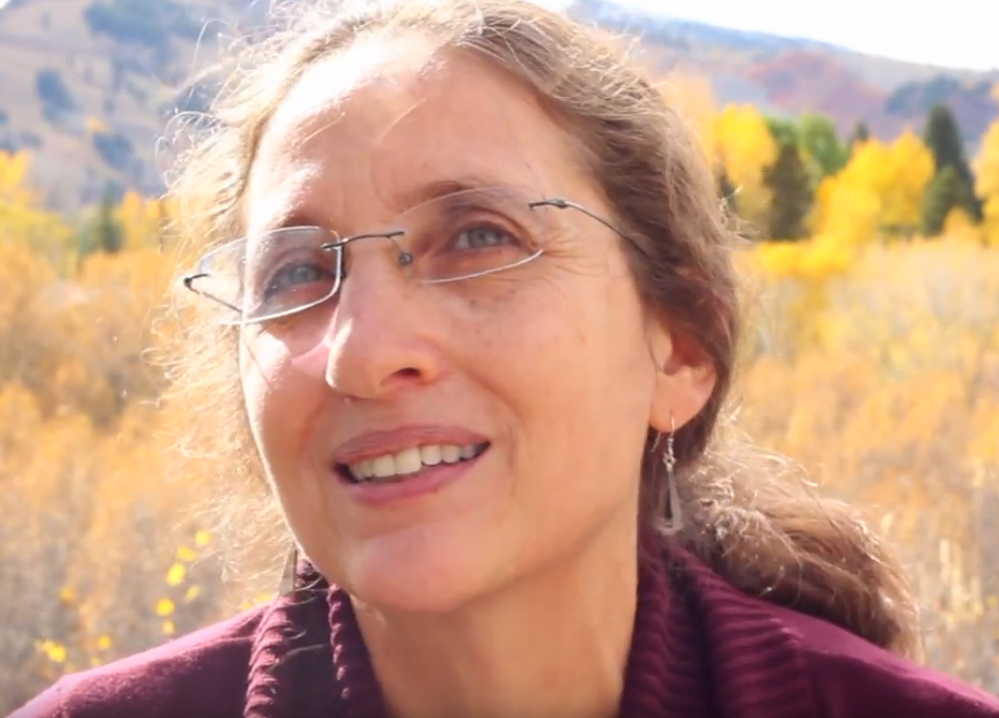
- DeFries in 2014
- Born: October 20, 1956
- Education: Washington University in St. Louis; Johns Hopkins University
- Awards: MacArthur Fellowship
- Scientific career
- Fields: Environmental geography
- Workplaces: Columbia University; University of Maryland, College Park

Ruth S. DeFries (born October 20, 1956) is an American environmental geographer who specializes in the use of remote sensing to study Earth's habitability under the influence of human activities, such as deforestation, that influence regulating biophysical and biogeochemical processes. She was one of 24 recipients of the 2007 MacArthur Fellowship, and was elected to the United States National Academy of Sciences in 2006.

== Life ==
DeFries received her Ph.D. in 1980 from the Department of Geography and Environmental Engineering at Johns Hopkins University and her B.A. in Earth Science in 1976 from Washington University in St. Louis. In April 2016, Columbia University named her a University Professor, its highest academic rank. She had previously been the Denning Family Professor of Sustainable Development in Columbia's Department of Ecology, Evolution, and Environmental Biology. Before moving to Columbia in 2008, she was a professor at the University of Maryland, College Park with joint appointments in the Department of Geography and the Earth System Science Interdisciplinary Center.

== An Ecomodernist Manifesto ==
In April 2015, DeFries joined with a group of scholars in issuing An Ecomodernist Manifesto. The other authors were: John Asafu-Adjaye, Linus Blomqvist, Stewart Brand, Barry Brook, Erle Ellis, Christopher Foreman, David Keith, Martin Lewis, Mark Lynas, Ted Nordhaus, Roger A. Pielke, Jr., Rachel Pritzker, Joyashree Roy, Mark Sagoff, Michael Shellenberger, Robert Stone, and Peter Teague

== Works ==
=== Books ===
- The Big Ratchet: How Humanity Thrives in the Face of Natural Crisis (2014) Basic Books

=== Scientific papers ===
DeFries is the author or co-author of over 100 scientific papers on such topics as: impacts of tropical fires on air quality and greenhouse gas emissions; land use, nutrition, and food security; land use and conservation in the tropics; climate and tropical agriculture; processes of tropical deforestation and degradation; methods for remote sensing of land cover; and reviews and conceptual papers.

== Awards ==
- 2007 MacArthur Fellows Program
- 2012 Fellow of the Ecological Society of America
- 2015 Breakthrough Paradigm Award
- 2017 Honorary Doctorate (Faculty of Science, Katholieke Universiteit Leuven (Belgium))
