= Roger A. Pielke Jr. =

American academic (born 1968)

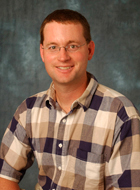
- Born: November 2, 1968 (age 57)
- Education: University of Colorado Boulder (B.A. 1990; M.A. 1992; Ph.D. 1994)
- Known for: Public policy and science, environment-society interactions
- Awards: Eduard Brueckner Prize (2006); NRC Board on Ocean Sciences Roger Revelle Commemorative Lecturer (2006); Sigma Xi Distinguished Lectureship Award (2000)
- Scientific career
- Fields: Political science, Environmental Studies, sports governance
- Workplaces: University of Colorado Boulder, Oxford University's James Martin Institute for Science and Civilization, NCAR Environmental and Societal Impacts Group

Notes
- Father Roger A. Pielke, atmospheric scientist (land and sea interactions with atmosphere, atmospheric dynamics, climate change)

Roger A. Pielke Jr. (born November 2, 1968) is an American political scientist and a nonresident senior fellow at the conservative think tank American Enterprise Institute. Before he was a professor of the Cooperative Institute for Research in Environmental Sciences (CIRES), and was the director of the Sports Governance Center within the Department of Athletics at the Center for Science and Technology Policy Research at the University of Colorado Boulder.

He previously served in the Environmental Studies Program and was a Fellow of the Cooperative Institute for Research in Environmental Sciences (CIRES) where he served as director of the Center for Science and Technology Policy Research at the University of Colorado Boulder from 2001 to 2007. Pielke was a visiting scholar at Oxford University's Saïd Business School in the 2007–2008 academic year.

Pielke's research and views on climate change have been a subject of controversy. Climate publications and scientists have accused him of spreading climate denial talking points and misinformation.

In a book review for Science Magazine, Kevin E. Trenberth criticized Pielke's work for mischaracterizing and "politicizing climate change science."

A prolific writer, his interests include understanding the politicization of science; decision making under uncertainty; policy education for scientists in areas such as climate change, disaster mitigation, and world trade; and research on the governance of sports organizations, including FIFA and the NCAA.

== Education and background ==
Pielke earned a B.A. in mathematics (1990), an M.A. in public policy (1992), and a Ph.D. in political science (1994), all from the University of Colorado Boulder. From 1993 to 2001, he worked as a staff scientist in the Environmental and Societal Impacts Group of the National Center for Atmospheric Research. Pielke was the director of graduate studies for the CU-Boulder Graduate Program in Environmental Studies from 2002 to 2004, and a board member for WeatherData, Inc. from 2001 to 2006. In 2012 he was awarded an honorary doctorate by Linköping University and the Public Service Award of the Geological Society of America. In 2024 Pielke became a member of the Norwegian Academy of Science and Letters.

== Professional writing ==
Pielke's early work was on the Space Shuttle program. In 1993 he argued that the shuttle was expensive and risky — that it was "probable" that another orbiter would be lost within 20–35 flights. Shortly before the loss of Columbia he warned that loss of another shuttle was only a matter of time. He has also been critical of the space station program.

Pielke has also written extensively on climate change policy. He has written that he accepts the Intergovernmental Panel on Climate Change (IPCC) view of the underlying science, stating, "The IPCC has concluded that greenhouse gas emissions resulting from human activity are an important driver of changes in climate. And on this basis alone I am personally convinced that it makes sense to take action to limit greenhouse gas emissions." He also writes, (in contradiction of the findings of the IPCC 6th assessment report) that "Any conceivable emissions reductions policies, even if successful, cannot have a perceptible impact on the climate for many decades", and from this he concludes that, "In coming decades the only policies that can effectively be used to manage the immediate effects of climate variability and change will be adaptive."

On the issues of hurricanes and climate change he has argued that the trend in increasing damage from hurricanes is primarily due to societal and economic factors (chiefly an increase in wealth density), rather than change in the frequency and intensity.

A "Guide to Climate Skeptics" published by Foreign Policy notes that Pielke's published views have led to him being considered by some a "denier" of climate change and by others an "alarmist". In October 2016, in a hacked email disclosed by WikiLeaks, Judd Legum states that a ThinkProgress blog was instrumental in his firing from the FiveThirtyEight website.

In April 2015, Pielke joined with a group issuing An Ecomodernist Manifesto. The other authors were: John Asafu-Adjaye, Linus Blomqvist, Stewart Brand, Barry Brook. Ruth DeFries, Erle Ellis, Christopher Foreman, David Keith, Martin Lewis, Mark Lynas, Ted Nordhaus, Rachel Pritzker, Joyashree Roy, Mark Sagoff, Michael Shellenberger, Robert Stone, and Peter Teague.

Pielke was named in a letter sent by Representative Raúl Grijalva (D-AZ) to institutions that employed scientists who had testified to Congress about climate change. The letter stated, "My colleagues and I cannot perform our duties if research or testimony provided to us is influenced by undisclosed financial relationships," and requested information including the sources and amounts of outside funding for those scientists who had testified.

Pielke rebuked Grijalva's investigation into alleged financial influence on him by fossil fuel companies. "I have no funding, declared or undeclared, with any fossil fuel company or interest. I never have. Representative Grijalva knows this too, because when I have testified before the US Congress, I have disclosed my funding and possible conflicts of interest... the Congressman and his staff, along with compliant journalists, are busy characterizing me in public as a 'climate skeptic' opposed to action on climate change. This of course is a lie. I have written a book calling for a carbon tax, I have publicly supported President Obama's proposed EPA carbon regulations, and I have just published another book strongly defending the scientific assessment of the IPCC with respect to disasters and climate change." Pielke stated in a blog post published after Grijalva began demanding Pielke's employer to disclose all of Pielke's personal correspondence (including draft letters) as it related to climate science.

Pielke contends that Democratic members of Congress were motivated by political and partisan interests. He believes that he was targeted due to his view that it is 'incorrect to associate the increasing costs of disasters with the emission of greenhouse gases'.

== Publications ==
- Editor, with Daniel Sarewitz and Radford Byerly Jr., Prediction: Science, Decision Making, and the Future of Nature, Island Press; New title edition (April 1, 2000), hardcover, 400 pages, ISBN 978-1559637756
- The Honest Broker: Making Sense of Science in Policy and Politics, Cambridge University Press (May 14, 2007), hardcover, 198 pages, ISBN 978-0521873208
- The Climate Fix: What Scientists and Politicians Won't Tell You About Global Warming, Basic Books (September 28, 2010), hardcover, 288 pages ISBN 0465020526
- The Rightful Place of Science: Disasters and Climate Change, Consortium for Science, Policy & Outcomes (November 1, 2014), trade paperback, 124 pages ISBN 978-0692297513
- The Edge: The War Against Cheating and Corruption in the Cutthroat World of Elite Sports, with Simon Kuper, Roaring Forties Press (29 September 2016), paperback, 288 pages ISBN 978-1938901577
- List of publications at sciencepolicy.colorado.edu

== See also ==
- Roger A. Pielke (atmospheric scientist; his father)
