= Ted Nordhaus =

American environmentalist and author (born 1965)

Ted Nordhaus (born 1965) is an American author and the director of research at the Breakthrough Institute. He has co-edited and written a number of books, including Break Through: From the Death of Environmentalism to the Politics of Possibility (2007) and An Ecomodernist Manifesto (2015) with collaborator Michael Shellenberger.

The two were described by Slate as "ecomodernists," while the authors have described themselves as the "bad boys" of environmentalism. Like Shellenberger, Nordhaus generally advocates for increased use of natural resources through an embrace of modernization, technological development, and increasing U.S. economic growth, usually through a combination of nuclear power and urbanization. Many of Nordhaus' positions have been criticized by environmental scientists and academics, while reception from writers and journalists in the popular press have been mixed.

== Breakthrough Institute ==
Nordhaus is director of research at the Breakthrough Institute, which he co-founded with Michael Shellenberger in 2003.

Nordhaus and Shellenberger have written a number of articles at Breakthrough, with subjects ranging from positive treatment of nuclear energy and shale gas to critiques of the works on planetary boundaries. Shellenberger left Breakthrough over what Nordhaus has described as "significant differences in political strategy, policy priorities, and personal style."

The Breakthrough Institute has argued that climate policy should be focused on higher levels of public funding on technology innovation to "make clean energy cheap", and has been critical of climate policies such as cap and trade and carbon pricing. The institute advocates higher levels of public spending on technology innovation, which they argue will lead to higher environmental quality, economic growth, and quality of life.

== Writing and reception ==
=== "The Death of Environmentalism: Global Warming in a Post-Environmental World" ===
In 2004 Nordhaus and Shellenberger co-authored "The Death of Environmentalism: Global Warming Politics in a Post-Environmental World." The paper argued that environmentalism is incapable of dealing with climate change and should "die" so that a new politics can be born.

The paper was criticized by members of the mainstream environmental movement. Former Sierra Club Executive Director Carl Pope called the essay "unclear, unfair and divisive." He said it contained multiple factual errors and misinterpretations. However, former Sierra Club President Adam Werbach praised the authors' arguments. Former Greenpeace Executive Director John Passacantando said in 2005, referring to both Nordhaus and Shellenberger, "These guys laid out some fascinating data, but they put it in this over-the-top language and did it in this in-your-face way." Michel Gelobter and other environmental experts and academics wrote The Soul of Environmentalism: Rediscovering transformational politics in the 21st century in response, criticizing "Death" for demanding increased technological innovation rather than addressing the systemic concerns of people of color.

Matthew Yglesias of The New York Times said that "Nordhaus and Shellenberger persuasively argue, environmentalists must stop congratulating themselves for their own willingness to confront inconvenient truths and must focus on building a politics of shared hope rather than relying on a politics of fear.", adding that the paper "is more convincing in its case for a change in rhetoric."

=== Break Through: From the Death of Environmentalism to the Politics of Possibility ===
In 2007 Nordhaus and Shellenberger published Break Through: From the Death of Environmentalism to the Politics of Possibility. The book is an argument for what its authors describe as a positive, "post-environmental" politics that abandons the environmentalist focus on nature protection for a new focus on technological innovation to create a new economy. They were named Time magazine Heroes of the Environment (2008) after writing the book.

The Wall Street Journal wrote that, "If heeded, Nordhaus and Shellenberger's call for an optimistic outlook -- embracing economic dynamism and creative potential -- will surely do more for the environment than any U.N. report or Nobel Prize." NPR's science correspondent Richard Harris listed Break Through on his "recommended reading list" for climate change.

However, academics Julie Sze and Michael Ziser argued that Break Through continued the trend Gelobter pointed out related the authors' commitment to technological innovation and capital accumulation instead of focusing on systemic inequalities that create environmental injustices. Specifically Sze and Ziser argue that Nordhaus and Shellenberger's "evident relish in their notoriety as the 'sexy' cosmopolitan 'bad boys' of environmentalism (their own words) introduces some doubt about their sincerity and reliability." The authors asserted that Break Through fails "to incorporate the aims of environmental justice while actively trading on suspect political tropes," such as blaming China and other Nations as large-scale polluters so that the United States may begin and continue Nationalistic technology-based research-and-development environmentalism, while continuing to emit more greenhouse gases than most other nations. In turn, Shellenberger and Nordhaus seek to move away from proven Environmental Justice tactics, "calling for a moratorium" on "community organizing." Such technology-based "approaches like those of Nordhaus and Shellenberger miss entirely" the "structural environmental injustice" that natural disasters like Hurricane Katrina make visible. Ultimately, the authors of Break Through believe "that community-based environmental justice poses a threat to the smooth operation of a highly capitalized, global-scale Environmentalism."

Joseph Romm, a former US Department of Energy official now with the Center for American Progress, argued that "Pollution limits are far, far more important than R&D for what really matters -- reducing greenhouse-gas emissions and driving clean technologies into the marketplace." (Romm also acknowledged that he had not read the book: "I won't waste time reading their new instant bestseller, unhelpfully titled Break Through, and you shouldn't either.") Reviewers for the San Francisco Chronicle, the American Prospect, and the Harvard Law Review argued that a critical reevaluation of green politics was unwarranted because global warming had become a high-profile issue and the Democratic Congress was preparing to act.

=== An Ecomodernist Manifesto ===
In April 2015, Nordhaus joined with a group of scholars in issuing An Ecomodernist Manifesto. It proposed dropping the goal of “sustainable development” and replacing it with a strategy to shrink humanity’s footprint by using natural resources more intensively through technological innovation. The authors argue that economic development is necessary to preserve the environment.

According to The New Yorker, "most of the criticism of [the Manifesto] was more about tone than content. The manifesto's basic arguments, after all, are hardly radical. To wit: technology, thoughtfully applied, can reduce the suffering, human and otherwise, caused by climate change; ideology, stubbornly upheld, can accomplish the opposite." At The New York Times, Eduardo Porter wrote approvingly of ecomodernism's alternative approach to sustainable development. In an article titled "Manifesto Calls for an End to 'People Are Bad' Environmentalism", Slate's Eric Holthaus wrote "It's inclusive, it's exciting, and it gives environmentalists something to fight for for a change." The science journal Nature editorialized the manifesto.

An Ecomodernist Manifesto was met with critiques similar to Gelobter's evaluation of "Death" and Sze and Ziser's analysis of Break Through. Environmental historian Jeremy Caradonna and environmental economist Richard B. Norgaard led a group of scholars in a review which argued that Ecomodernism "violates everything we know about ecosystems, energy, population, and natural resources," and "Far from being an ecological statement of principles, the Manifesto merely rehashes the naïve belief that technology will save us and that human ingenuity can never fail." Further, "The Manifesto suffers from factual errors and misleading statements."

Environmental and Art historian T.J. Demos agreed with Caradonna, and wrote in 2017 that the Manifesto "is really nothing more than a bad utopian fantasy," that functions to support oil and gas industry and as "an apology for nuclear energy." Demos continued that "What is additionally striking about the Ecomodernist document, beyond its factual weaknesses and ecological falsehoods, is that there is no mention of social justice or democratic politics," and "no acknowledgement of the fact that big technologies like nuclear reinforce centralized power, the military-industrial complex, and the inequalities of corporate globalization."

== Personal life ==
Nordhaus is the son of Robert Nordhaus, former General Counsel of the United States Department of Energy, nephew of economist William Nordhaus and the brother of Hannah Nordhaus, environmental journalist and author of The Beekeeper's Lament.
