= Michael Shellenberger =

American author and environmental policy writer (born 1971)

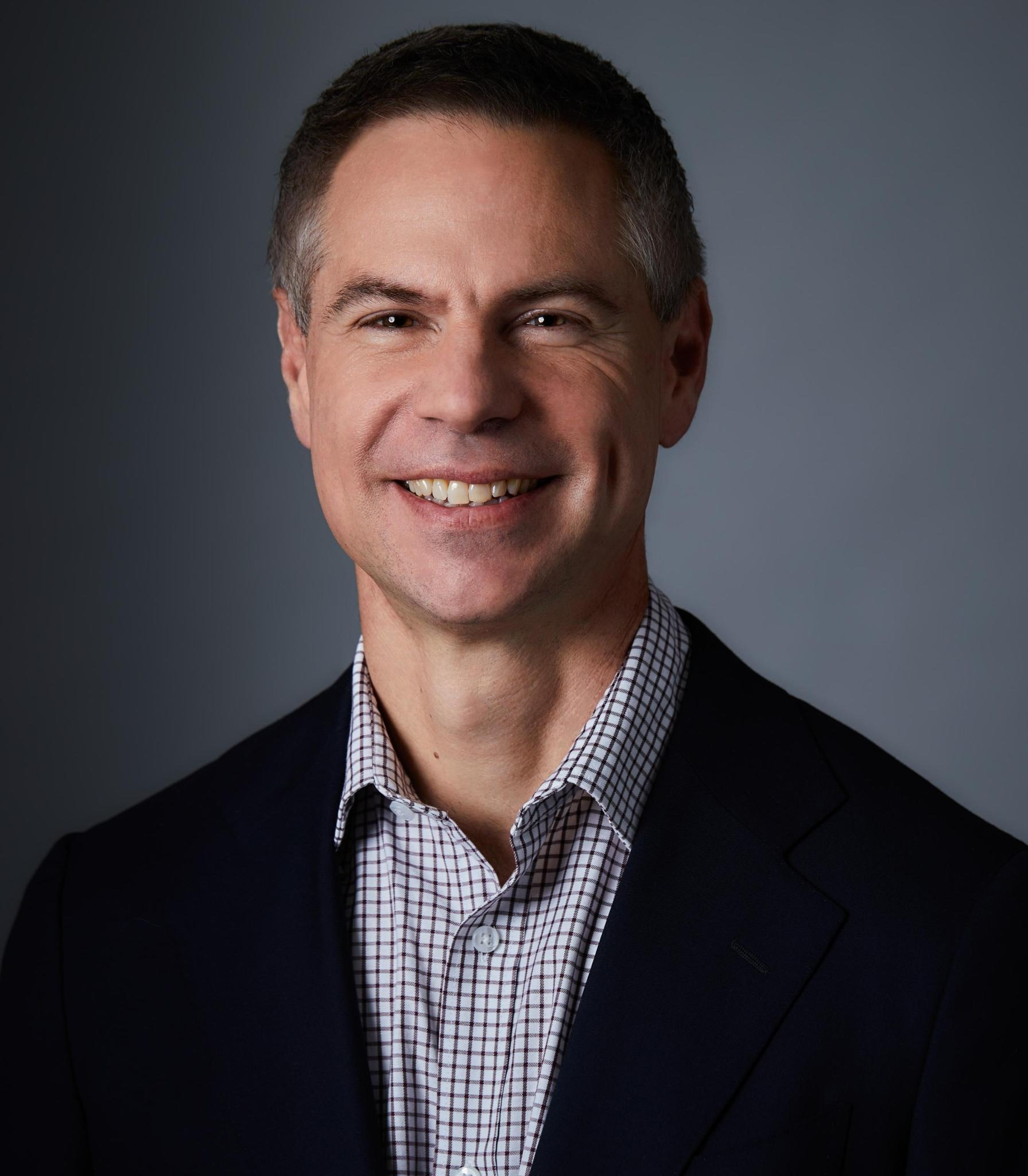
- Shellenberger in 2024
- Born: June 16, 1971 (age 55); Colorado, U.S.
- Education: Earlham College (BA); University of California, Santa Cruz (MA)
- Political party: Democratic (before 2022); Independent (2022–present)
- Movement: Ecomodernism; Radical centrism
- Spouse: Helen Lee
- Children: 2
- Writing career
- Subjects: Energy, global warming, human development
- Shellenberger's voice On his political vision
- Website: Official website

Michael D. Shellenberger (born June 16, 1971) is a political and ecomodernist activist and writer best known for his heterodox views. (Note: In addition to sources cited in the rest of the article: Kallis, Giorgos; Bliss, Sam (January 4, 2019). "Post-environmentalism: origins and evolution of a strange idea". Journal of Political Ecology. 26 (1): 466–485. Bibcode:2019JPolE..2623238K. doi:10.2458/v26i1.23238. S2CID 202259917. Archived from the original on April 2, 2024.; Adamson, Joni; Slovic, Scott (2009). "Guest Editors' Introduction the Shoulders We Stand on: An Introduction to Ethnicity and Ecocriticism". MELUS. 34 (2): 5–24. doi:10.1353/mel.0.0019. ISSN 0163-755X. JSTOR 20532676. S2CID 143615564. Archived from the original on August 20, 2023.; Stein, Hannes (June 20, 2020). "Die Illusionen der Öko-Romantiker". Die Welt. Archived from the original on February 15, 2021.) Born in Colorado, he earned degrees in peace and global studies and anthropology in the 1990s. After founding two public relations firms, in 2003 he co-founded the ecomodernist think tank Breakthrough Institute. Scientists, including some he has cited, have criticized his comments on climate change as "bad science"; a review in the Los Angeles Review of Books described his "history of anti-green contrarianism"; and the journalism site IJNet reported multiple errors in his reporting.

Shellenberger authored Apocalypse Never (2020), about the environment, and San Fransicko (2021), about homelessness. He has been active in critiquing the environmental movement, offering alternative views on climate threats and policies. He contends that while global warming is a concern, it is "not the end of the world", and advocates for the use of genetically modified organisms (GMOs), industrial agriculture, fracking, and nuclear power as tools for environmental protection.

Shellenberger ran unsuccessfully for governor of California in 2018 and 2022.

== Early life and education ==
Shellenberger was born and raised in Colorado to Mennonite parents. He is a 1989 graduate of Greeley Central High School. He earned a Bachelor of Arts degree from the Peace and Global Studies program at Earlham College in 1993. Subsequently, he earned a Master of Arts degree in anthropology from the University of California, Santa Cruz in 1996.

He is proficient in Portuguese.

== Career ==
After graduation, Shellenberger moved to San Francisco to work on left-wing causes. He worked with Global Exchange on a Nike boycott. He created a nonprofit public relations firm, Communication Works, that worked on many progressive causes, and Lumina Strategies. Shellenberger in 2003 founded the Breakthrough Institute. While at Breakthrough, Shellenberger wrote a number of articles with subjects ranging from positive treatment of nuclear energy and shale gas, to critiques of the planetary boundaries hypothesis. He worked to burnish the reputations of prominent clients including Venezuelan President Hugo Chávez.

Shellenberger then founded Environmental Progress, organising campaigns to keep nuclear power plants in operation. Shellenberger has also been called by conservative lawmakers to testify before the U.S. Congress about climate change and in favor of nuclear energy. In December 2022, Shellenberger was one of the authors who released sections of annotated internal Twitter Files authorized by new owner Elon Musk. As of December 2022, he is a writer for The Free Press.

In November 2023, Shellenberger was the key note speaker at a Genspect conference. In this speech he said that the idea of transgender people was a "woke religion" and went on further, saying "We are creating, through ideological means and social media, gender dysphoria. ... These are ideologically driven failures of civilization".

Shellenberger is the co-founder of Public, a newsletter that covers "stories on the most important issues of the day, from censorship and cities to mental health and addiction to energy and the environment". In January 2022, the San Francisco Chronicle indicated Shellenberger was first to report on the use of drugs at a recently opened San Francisco social services facility. In December 2022, the facility closed. In June 2023, Public named three researchers who fell ill in November 2019, later confirmed by The Wall Street Journal via US government sources.

On April 3, 2024, Shellenberger published the "Twitter Files – Brazil", resulting in a formal Congressional inquiry, and two Congressional hearings, at which Shellenberger testified. Investigative journalists subsequently highlighted multiple errors in Shellenberger's reporting. In September 2024, Shellenberger appeared with Bill Nye at an event entitled "Can Science Save the World?" hosted by New College of Florida. The event "seeks to advance civil discourse and engagement through facilitating events that foster open discussion and debate on relevant public policy issues."

Shellenberger has faced accusations of "bad science" for his comments on climate change in Apocalypse Never; he has also been criticized for arguing with prominent climate scientists on social media and for "apologizing" to the world on behalf of environmentalists. A panel of scientists organized by Climate Feedback analyzed the claims he made in his "apology" article, concluding that they were "inaccurate or mislead readers by contradicting available evidence or using scientific data out of context." A Snopes article, which consulted multiple scientists that Shellenberger had cited, was similarly critical; Michael Mann called one of Shellenberger's central arguments "completely wrong," and found it was also contradicted by the very IEA source Shellenberger used to support it.

As of 2026 Shellenberger is on the faculty of the University of Austin in the area of "Politics, Censorship and Free Speech."

== Congressional testimony ==
Shellenberger has testified before the United States Congress on multiple occasions on topics ranging from climate change, state-sponsored censorship and disinformation, UFOs, and artificial intelligence.

Topic	Date	Committee	Subcommittee
"An Update on the Climate Crisis: From Science to Solutions"	January 15, 2020	House Committee on Science, Space, and Technology	Full Committee
"Governing AI Through Acquisition and Procurement"	September 14, 2023	Senate Committee on Homeland Security and Governmental Affairs	Full Committee
"Hearing on The Weaponization of The Federal Government"	November 30, 2023	House Committee on the Judiciary	Select Subcommittee on The Weaponization of The Federal Government
"Brazil: A Crisis of Democracy, Freedom, & Rule of Law?"	May 7, 2024	House Committee on Foreign Affairs	Full Committee
"Unidentified Anomalous Phenomena: Exposing the Truth"	November 13, 2024	House Committee on Oversight and Government Reform	Committee on Oversight and Accountability
"The Censorship-Industrial Complex, Part 3: The Foreign Threat"	February 12, 2025	House Committee on the Judiciary	Full Committee
"USAID Censorship and Disinformation Operations Aimed at the American People"	February 13, 2025	Senate Committee on Homeland Security and Governmental Affairs	Full Committee

=== Claims regarding UAP reports ===
Michael Shellenberger testifies before congress. Screenshot from a U.S. Congressional video. Public domain.

During the November, 2024 U.S. House of Representative Oversight Committee hearing titled "Unidentified Anomalous Phenomena: Exposing the Truth", Shellenberger claimed sources have told him that intelligence communities "are sitting on a huge amount of visual and other information" about Unidentified Anomalous Phenomena (UAP). He said that there are hundreds or even thousands of undisclosed images and videos. Shellenberger had previously published a story that alleged the U.S. Government was operating a secret UFO program called Immaculate Constellation. “The intelligence community is treating us like children,” Shellenberger testified. “It’s time for us to know the truth about this. I think that we can handle it.”

== Writing and reception ==
=== The Death of Environmentalism ===
In 2004, Nordhaus and Shellenberger co-authored "The Death of Environmentalism: Global Warming Politics in a Post-Environmental World." The paper argued that environmentalism is incapable of dealing with climate change and should "die" so that a new politics can be born. The paper was criticized by members of the mainstream environmental movement. Carl Pope, the former executive director of the Sierra Club, called the essay "unclear, unfair and divisive", stating it contained multiple factual errors and misinterpretations. Adam Werbach, another former Sierra Club president, praised the paper's arguments. John Passacantando, the former Greenpeace executive director, said in 2005 that Shellenberger and Nordhaus "laid out some fascinating data, but they put it in this over-the-top language and did it in this in-your-face way." Michel Gelobter, as well as other environmental experts and academics, wrote The Soul of Environmentalism: Rediscovering transformational politics in the 21st century as a response that criticized "Death" for demanding increased technological innovation instead of addressing the systemic concerns of people of color.

=== Break Through ===
In 2007, Shellenberger and Nordhaus published Break Through: From the Death of Environmentalism to the Politics of Possibility. The book is an argument for what its authors describe as a positive, "post-environmental" politics that abandons the environmentalist focus on nature protection for a new focus on technological innovation to create a new economy. They were among 32 of Time magazine's Heroes of the Environment (2008) after writing the book, and received the 2008 Green Book Award from science journalist John Horgan. The Wall Street Journal wrote that "(i)f heeded, Nordhaus and Shellenberger's call for an optimistic outlook – embracing economic dynamism and creative potential – will surely do more for the environment than any U.N. report or Nobel Prize."

Environmental scholars Julie Sze and Michael Ziser questioned Shellenberger and Nordhaus's goals in publishing Break Through, arguing the "evident relish in their notoriety as the 'sexy'(,) cosmopolitan 'bad boys' of environmentalism (their own words) introduces some doubt about their sincerity and reliability." Sze and Ziser asserted that Break Through failed "to incorporate the aims of environmental justice while actively trading on suspect political tropes", such as blaming China and other nations as large-scale polluters. Furthermore, Sze and Ziser claim that Shellenberger and Nordhaus advocate technology-based approaches that miss entirely the "structural environmental injustice" that natural disasters like Hurricane Katrina make visible. Ultimately, "Shellenberger believes that community-based environmental justice poses a threat to the smooth operation of a highly capitalized, global-scale Environmentalism."

Joseph Romm, a former US Department of Energy official now with the liberal think tank Center for American Progress, argued that "(p)ollution limits are far, far more important than R&D for what really matters – reducing greenhouse-gas emissions and driving clean technologies into the marketplace." Environmental journalist David Roberts, writing in Grist, argued that while the BTI and its founders garner much attention, their policy is lacking, and ultimately they "receive a degree of press coverage that wildly exceeds their intellectual contributions." Reviewers for the San Francisco Chronicle, the American Prospect and the Harvard Law Review argued that a critical reevaluation of green politics was unwarranted because global warming had become a high-profile issue and the Democratic Congress was preparing to act.

=== An Ecomodernist Manifesto ===
In April 2015, Shellenberger joined a group of scholars and Whole Earth Catalog founder, author Stewart Brand, in issuing An Ecomodernist Manifesto. It proposed dropping the goal of "sustainable development" and replacing it with a strategy to shrink humanity's footprint by using natural resources more intensively through technological innovation. The authors argue that economic development is necessary to preserve the environment.

An Ecomodernist Manifesto was met with critiques similar to Gelobter's evaluation of "Death" and Sze and Ziser's analysis of Break Through. Environmental historian Jeremy Caradonna and environmental economist Richard B. Norgaard led a group of environmental scholars in a critique, arguing that Ecomodernism "violates everything we know about ecosystems, energy, population, and natural resources," and "Far from being an ecological statement of principles, the Manifesto merely rehashes the naïve belief that technology will save us and that human ingenuity can never fail." Further, "The Manifesto suffers from factual errors and misleading statements."

Environmental and Art historian T.J. Demos agreed with Caradonna, and wrote in 2017 that the Manifesto "is really nothing more than a bad utopian fantasy," that functions to support oil and gas industry and as "an apology for nuclear energy." Demos continued that "What is additionally striking about the Ecomodernist document, beyond its factual weaknesses and ecological falsehoods, is that there is no mention of social justice or democratic politics," and "no acknowledgement of the fact that big technologies like nuclear reinforce centralized power, the military-industrial complex, and the inequalities of corporate globalization."

=== Apocalypse Never ===
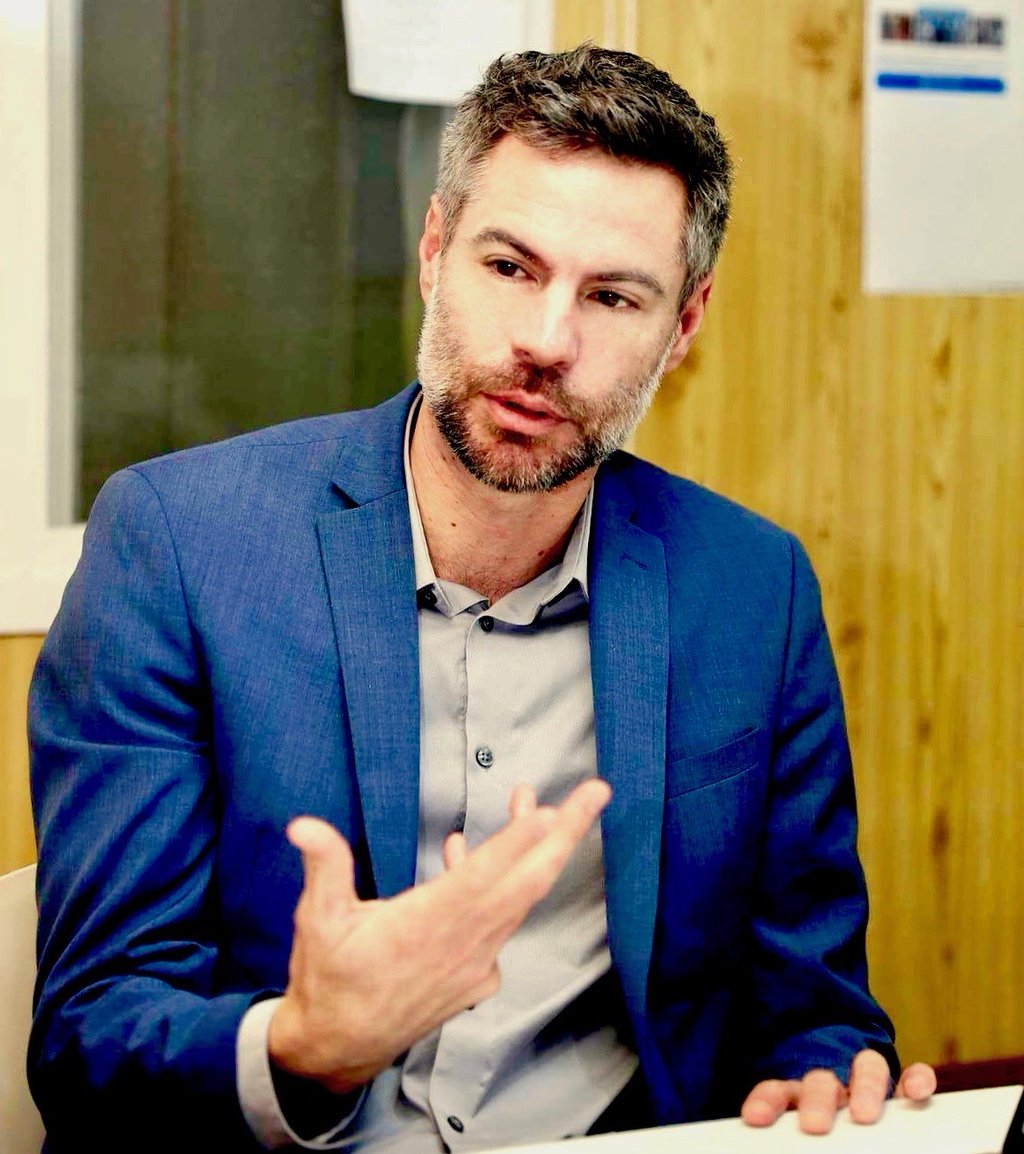
Shellenberger in 2017

In June 2020, Shellenberger published Apocalypse Never: Why Environmental Alarmism Hurts Us All, in which he argues that climate change is not the existential threat it is portrayed to be in popular media and activism. Rather, he posits that technological innovation, if allowed to continue and grow, will remedy environmental issues. According to Shellenberger, the book "explores how and why so many of us came to see important but manageable environmental problems as the end of the world, and why the people who are the most apocalyptic about environmental problems tend to oppose the best and most obvious solutions to solving them."

In his book, Shellenberger argues that people shouldn't need to be worried about climate change causing crop failure, famine and consequent mass deaths because he believes that when it comes to food production, humans will be able to produce more food despite the effects of climate change. Shellenberger cites an editorial that is published by a group led by Eric Holt-Giménez to support his statement, however Holt-Giménez later told Snopes that Shellenberger "has either misunderstood our editorial, or is purposefully mischaracterizing our points." Instead Holt-Giménez criticized the industrial farming that Shellenberger advocates, and says that such practices are using a model of overproduction that generates poverty. He explained that people typically don't become hungry because there is not enough food, but that instead they become hungry when they are too poor to afford to buy the food that is produced.

Reviews of the book were mixed. Kerry Emanuel, who endorsed the book before publication, said that while he did not regret doing so, he wished that "the book did not carry with it its own excesses and harmful baggage."

In contrast, in reviewing Apocalypse Never for Yale Climate Connections, environmental scientist Peter Gleick argued that "bad science and bad arguments abound" in the book, writing that "what is new in here isn't right, and what is right isn't new." In a review for the Los Angeles Review of Books environmental economist Sam Bliss said that while "the book itself is well written", Shellenberger "plays fast and loose with the facts" and "Troublingly, he seems more concerned with showing climate-denying conservatives clever new ways to own the libs than with convincing environmentalists of anything." Similarly, environmental and technological social scientists Taylor Dotson and Michael Bouchey have argued that as an "Environmental activist" and "ecomodernist", Shellenberger's writing in his books and on his foundation's website "bombards readers with facts that are disconnected, out of context, poorly explained, and of questionable relevance," and ultimately, his "fanatic, scientistic discourse stands in the way of nuclear energy policy that is both intelligent and democratic."

A 2020 Forbes article by Shellenberger, in which he promoted Apocalypse Never, was analyzed by seven academic reviewers and one editor from the Climate Feedback fact-checking project. The reviewers conclude that Shellenberger "mixes accurate and inaccurate claims in support of a misleading and overly simplistic argumentation about climate change." Zeke Hausfather, Director of Climate and Energy for The Breakthrough Institute, wrote that Shellenberger "includes a mix of accurate, misleading, and patently false statements. While it is useful to push back against claims that climate change will lead to the end of the world or human extinction, to do so by inaccurately downplaying real climate risks is deeply problematic and counterproductive." The Forbes article was later deleted for violating Forbes' policy against self-promotion. In response, Shellenberger called the deletion censorship and The Daily Wire, Quillette, and Breitbart News re-published all or parts of the article.

=== San Fransicko ===
In 2021, Shellenberger published San Fransicko: Why Progressives Ruin Cities, a criticism of progressive social policies. Benjamin Schneider, writing in the San Francisco Examiner, described the book's thesis as "[P]rogressives have embraced 'victimology,' a belief system wherein society's downtrodden are subject to no rules or consequences for their actions. This ideology, cultivated in cities like San Francisco for decades and widely adopted over the past two years, is the key to understanding, and thus solving, our crises of homelessness, drug overdoses and crime."

Wes Enzinna, writing in The New York Times, charged that Shellenberger "does exactly what he accuses his left-wing enemies of doing: ignoring facts, best practices and complicated and heterodox approaches in favor of dogma." Olga Khazan, writing in The Atlantic, said that "The problem — or opportunity — for Shellenberger is that virtually every homelessness expert disagrees with him. ('Like an internet troll that's written a book' is how Jennifer Friedenbach, the executive director of San Francisco's Coalition on Homelessness, described him to me.)." Khazan also noted that "some experts agree with some of Shellenberger's critiques of Housing First. Though they stop short of endorsing Shellenberger or his views." Tim Stanley, writing in The Daily Telegraph, described it as a "revelatory, must-read book", but added "There is much in the argument for liberal readers to contest."

== Politics ==
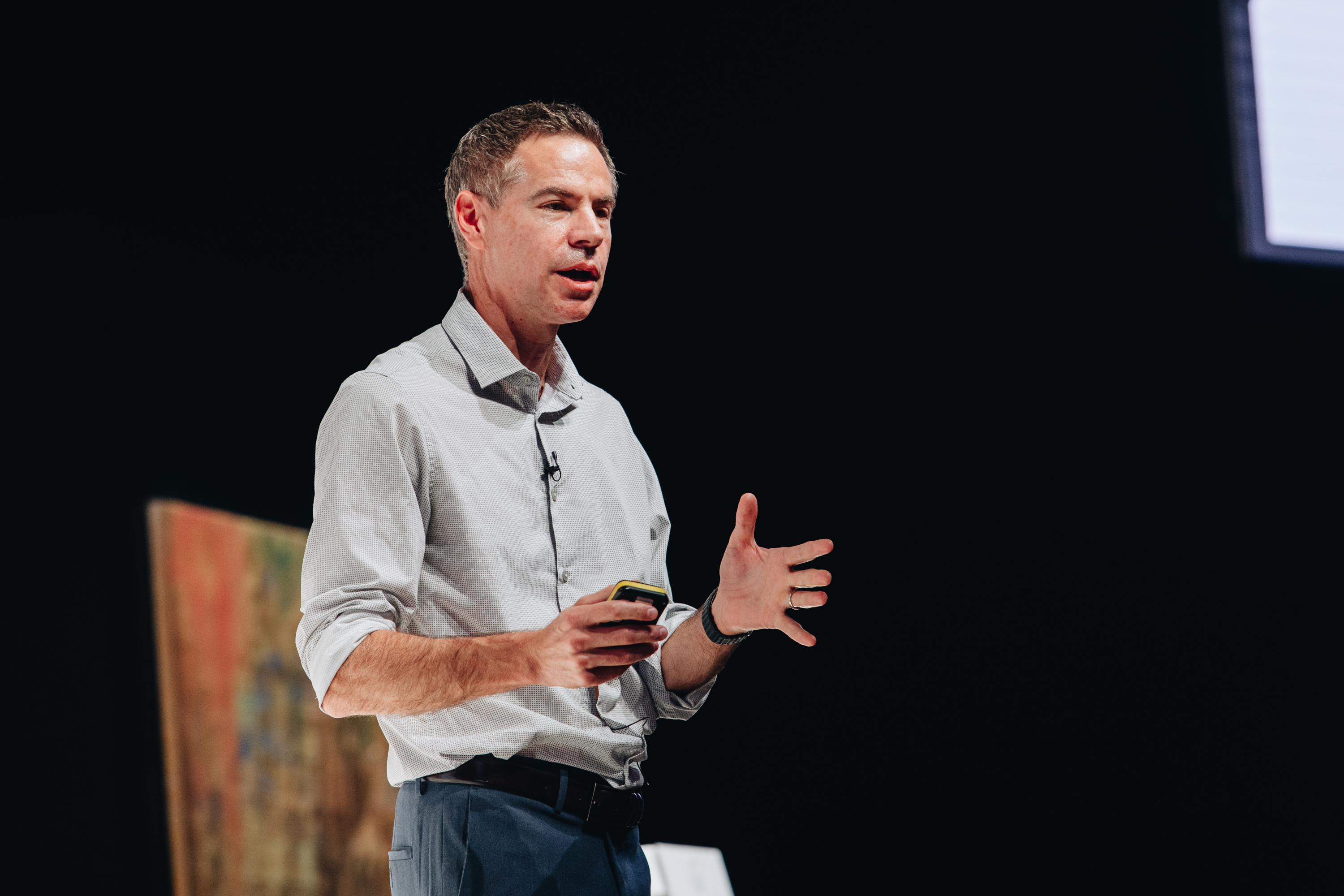
Michael Shellenberger speaking at the 2023 Alliance for Responsible Citizenship Forum

Shellenberger worked with left-wing groups in the San Francisco Bay Area in the 1990s and in 2021 changed his party registration from Democrat to Independent. He has written widely on the environment, homelessness, and other progressive issues. A self-described ecomodernist, Shellenberger believes that economic growth can continue without negative environmental impacts through technological research and development, usually through a combination of nuclear power and urbanization. Shellenberger advocated against the closure of Diablo Canyon nuclear generating station, which was eventually not closed.

He was the keynote speaker for Genspect's 2022 conference in Denver.

=== 2018 California gubernatorial election ===
Shellenberger was a Democratic candidate for governor in the 2018 California gubernatorial election, placing ninth in a field of twenty-seven candidates with 0.5% of the vote, with 31,692 votes (the winner was Gavin Newsom with 2,343,792 votes).

Forbes profiled Shellenberger before the election. He said in the interview that nuclear power must be the primary fuel to address climate change, calling environmentalists who opposed nuclear "fake environmentalists." In that election, James Hansen, the "grandfather of the modern climate movement" endorsed him.

=== 2022 California gubernatorial election ===
Shellenberger ran as an independent in the 2022 gubernatorial election on a platform calling for homelessness reform via removal of encampments and mandatory treatment for drug addiction and mental illness, advocating for water desalination as an answer to California's water shortage, and increasing use of nuclear power, specifically by keeping the Diablo Canyon Power Plant open and building new power plants. Shellenberger placed third in a field of twenty-six with 4.1% of the vote. A HuffPost profile called Shellenberger a centrist, arguing that "Shellenberger instead is closer in character to figures like New York Mayor Eric Adams (D), a moderate critic of certain left-wing dogmas". The same article noted his support for "abortion rights, universal health care, gun safety regulation, a $15 minimum wage, collective bargaining rights, and alternatives to incarceration for drug-related crimes". The Wall Street Journal wrote that Shellenberger is a proponent of school choice initiatives.

== Personal life ==
Shellenberger resides in Berkeley, California, with his wife, sociologist Helen Lee. Raised by Mennonite parents, in adulthood he became irreligious and an existentialist. While writing his book Apocalypse Never, he returned to the Christian faith, seeing the religion as a solution to society's "intense hatred and anger".
