= Gelobter =

Gelobter is a surname. Notable people with the surname include:

- Lisa Gelobter (born 1971), American computer scientist
- Michel Gelobter (born c.1961), American entrepreneur
