= San Fransicko =

2021 book by Michael Shellenberger

San Fransicko: Why Progressives Ruin Cities
- First edition
- Author: Michael Shellenberger
- Publisher: HarperCollins
- Publication date: 2021
- Pages: 416
- ISBN: 9780063093621 (Hardcover)

San Fransicko: Why Progressives Ruin Cities is a 2021 book by Michael Shellenberger. The book discusses homelessness and crime. The title is a pun on San Francisco, a city in California, U.S.

== Reception ==
Benjamin Schneider, writing in the San Francisco Examiner, described the book's thesis as "[P]rogressives have embraced 'victimology,' a belief system wherein society’s downtrodden are subject to no rules or consequences for their actions. This ideology, cultivated in cities like San Francisco for decades and widely adopted over the past two years, is the key to understanding, and thus solving, our crises of homelessness, drug overdoses and crime."

Several reviewers have criticized Shellenberger's views on the causes of homelessness and raised issues with where the book casts blame. Wes Enzinna, writing in The New York Times, charged that Shellenberger "does exactly what he accuses his left-wing enemies of doing: ignoring facts, best practices and complicated and heterodox approaches in favor of dogma." Olga Khazan, writing in The Atlantic, said that "The problem—or opportunity—for Shellenberger is that virtually every homelessness expert disagrees with him. ('Like an internet troll that's written a book' is how Jennifer Friedenbach, the executive director of San Francisco's Coalition on Homelessness, described him to me.)". Tim Stanley, writing in The Daily Telegraph, described it as a "revelatory, must-read book", but added "There is much in the argument for liberal readers to contest."

Otto Lehto, writing for the Austrian Economics Center, criticized the book as "much better at pointing a finger at the problem than offering workable alternative solutions", and the proposed solutions in the book as "unimaginative and embarrassing cavalcade of old conservative cliches and tropes".

== See also ==
- Homelessness in the San Francisco Bay Area
