= Break Through (book) =

2007 book by Ted Nordhaus and Michael Shellenberger

Break Through: From the Death of Environmentalism to the Politics of Possibility
- Author: Ted Nordhaus; Michael Shellenberger
- Audio read by: Jeff Cummings
- Language: English
- Subject: Environmentalism
- Publisher: Houghton Mifflin Harcourt
- Publication date: August 31, 2007
- Publication place: United States
- Media type: Print; audio
- Pages: 256
- ISBN: 978-0618658251

Break Through: From the Death of Environmentalism to the Politics of Possibility, first published in October 2007, is a book written by Ted Nordhaus and Michael Shellenberger, both long-time environmental strategists. Break Through is an argument for a positive, "post-environmental" politics that abandons the traditional environmentalist focus on nature protection for a focus on creating a new sustainable economy.

The book is based on a controversial October-2004 essay by the same authors, "The Death of Environmentalism: Global Warming Politics in a Post-Environmental World." The essay argues that environmentalism is conceptually and institutionally incapable of dealing with climate change and should "die" so that a new politics can be born. The essay was widely discussed among liberals and greens at Salon, Grist, and The New York Times.

After the failure of climate legislation in the U.S. Senate for the third time in June 2008, Time magazine named Nordhaus and Shellenberger "Heroes of the Environment", calling Break Through "prescient" for its prediction that climate policy should focus not on making fossil fuels expensive through regulation but rather on making clean energy cheap. The book's authors reiterated this argument in a September 2008 op-ed for the Los Angeles Times, arguing for $30–$50bn in annual research subsidies for clean energy.

In early 2008, Break Through won the Center for Science Writing's Green Book Award, which comes with a $5,000 prize for the author(s).

== Overview ==
The first half of Break Through is a criticism of the green "politics of limits". The book begins with the birth of environmentalism. Nordhaus and Shellenberger argue that environmentalism in the U.S. emerged from post-war affluence, which they argue is a clue to understanding how ecological movements might emerge in places like China and India.

Progressive social reforms, from the Civil Rights Act to the Clean Water Act, tend to occur during times of prosperity and rising expectations—not immiseration and declining expectations. Both the environmental movement and the civil rights movement emerged as a consequence of rising prosperity. It was the middle-class, young, and educated black Americans who were on the forefront of the civil rights movement. Poor blacks were active, but the movement was overwhelmingly led by educated, middle-class intellectuals and community leaders (preachers prominent among them). This was also the case with the white supporters of the civil rights movement, who tended to be more highly educated and more affluent than the general American population. In short, the civil rights movement no more emerged because African Americans were suddenly denied their freedom than the environmental movement emerged because America suddenly started polluting.

Chapter two criticizes conservation efforts in Brazil, suggesting that nature protection cannot save the Amazon unless environmentalists provide an alternative way for the country to prosper. The authors criticize the environmental justice movement as focusing on low-priority pollution concerns in communities of color, narrowing the movement's focus instead of expanding it to include job creation and public health. They also fault climate activists for seeing climate change as a pollution problem like acid rain and the ozone hole instead of as an economic development and technological innovation challenge. The authors draw on science philosopher Thomas Kuhn to argue that environmentalists are stuck in a "pollution paradigm" when it comes to global warming.

One of Kuhn's most famous examples was of the revolution led first by Copernicus and later by Galileo to overthrow the Earth-centered view of the solar system and replace it with our current sun-centered one. But in other instances, new paradigms leave part of the old paradigms intact, such as Einstein's theory of relativity, which left Newton's theory of gravity on Earth intact even as it revolutionized our understanding of mass and energy in the rest of the universe.

Such may be the case with environmentalism. In many situations the pollution paradigm may still be a good way of understanding and dealing with air and water pollution. Our contention is not that the pollution paradigm is no longer useful for dealing with acid rain or rivers aflame but that it is profoundly inadequate for understanding and dealing with global warming and other ecological crises.

Part II of Break Through, "the politics of possibility", is an argument for environmentalism to die and become reborn as a new progressive politics, one capable of winning a new social contract for Americans, so that they are financially secure enough to be able to care about ecological challenges, and a $500 billion public–private investment in clean energy. The last half of the book makes the case for a new social contract for the post-industrial age, one capable of helping Americans overcome "insecure affluence", whereby voters are both more materially wealthy but also more financially insecure than ever before. Nordhaus and Shellenberger say environmentalism should evolve from being a religion into being a church, and they see evangelical churches, with their capacity for providing belonging and fulfilment to their middle-class members, as models for a new "pre-political" institution for secular progressives. The authors argue for concrete policies such as "Global Warming Preparedness", and a global clean energy investment strategy modeled on the creation of the European Union after World War II.

In the final chapter of the book, "Greatness", the authors argue that global warming will reshape national and international politics:

Climate change and the political response to it is already defining a new fault line in the culture. On one side of that line will be a global NIMBYism that sees the planet as too fragile to support the hopes and dreams of seven billion humans. It will seek to establish and enforce the equivalent of an international caste system in which the poor of the developing world are consigned to energy poverty in perpetuity. This politics of limits will be anti-immigration, anti-globalization, and anti-growth. It will be zero-sum, fiscally conservative, and deficit-oriented. It will combine Malthusian environmentalism with Hobbesian conservatism.

On the other side will be those who believe that there is room enough for all of us to live secure and free lives. It will be pro-growth, progressive, and internationalist. It will drive global development by creating new markets. It will see in institutions like the WTO, the World Bank, and the International Monetary Fund not a corporate conspiracy to keep people poor and destroy the environment, but an opportunity to drive a kind of development that is both sustainable and equitable. It will embrace technology without being technocratic. It will seek adaptation proactively, not fatalistically. It will establish social and economic security as preconditions for ecological action. It will be large and transformative, but not millenarian.

== Critical reception ==
Break Through was criticized and praised by both the left and the right. Wired magazine wrote that Break Through "could turn out to be the best thing to happen to environmentalism since Rachel Carson's Silent Spring." The Wall Street Journal wrote, "If heeded, Nordhaus and Shellenberger's call for an optimistic outlook -- embracing economic dynamism and creative potential -- will surely do more for the environment than any U.N. report or Nobel Prize". NPR's science correspondent Richard Harris listed Break Through on his "recommended reading list" for climate change.

Other reviewers were harshly critical. Joseph Romm, a former US Department of Energy official now with the Center for American Progress, argued that "Pollution limits are far, far more important than R&D for what really matters -- reducing greenhouse-gas emissions and driving clean technologies into the marketplace." Environmental journalist David Roberts, writing in Grist, argued that while the BTI and its founders garner much attention, their policy is lacking, and ultimately they "receive a degree of press coverage that wildly exceeds their intellectual contributions." (Romm also acknowledged that he had not read the book: "I won't waste time reading their new instant bestseller, unhelpfully titled Break Through, and you shouldn't either.") Reviewers for the San Francisco Chronicle, the American Prospect, and the Harvard Law Review argued that a critical reevaluation of green politics was unwarranted because global warming had become a high-profile issue and the Democratic Congress was preparing to act.

Environmental scholars Julie Sze and Michael Ziser questioned Shellenberger and Nordhaus's goals in publishing Break Through, noting that their "evident relish in their notoriety as the 'sexy' cosmopolitan 'bad boys' of environmentalism (their own words) introduces some doubt about their sincerity and reliability." The authors asserted that Break Through fails "to incorporate the aims of environmental justice while actively trading on suspect political tropes," such as blaming China and other nations as large-scale polluters. They claimed that Shellenberger and Nordhaus advocate technology-based approaches that miss entirely "the "structural environmental injustice" that natural disasters like Hurricane Katrina make visible. Ultimately, "Shellenberger believes that community-based environmental justice poses a threat to the smooth operation of a highly capitalized, global-scale Environmentalism."
