= Schriever wargame =

US military space combat wargames

The Schriever wargames are a series of space combat wargames organized by the United States armed forces since 1998. The wargames are designed to test the readiness of participants to address future conflict scenarios.

In 2024, a whistleblower mistakenly identified documents from the 2018 Schriever wargame as evidence of a secret UFO / UAP project called Immaculate Constellation.

== Background ==
The Schriever wargames are approximately biennial wargames first sponsored by the United States Air Force Space Command in 1998 and, later, by the United States Space Force. Schriever wargames typically involve scenarios set more than a decade in the future to test the abilities of participants to navigate hypothetical challenges.

== Past Schriever wargames ==
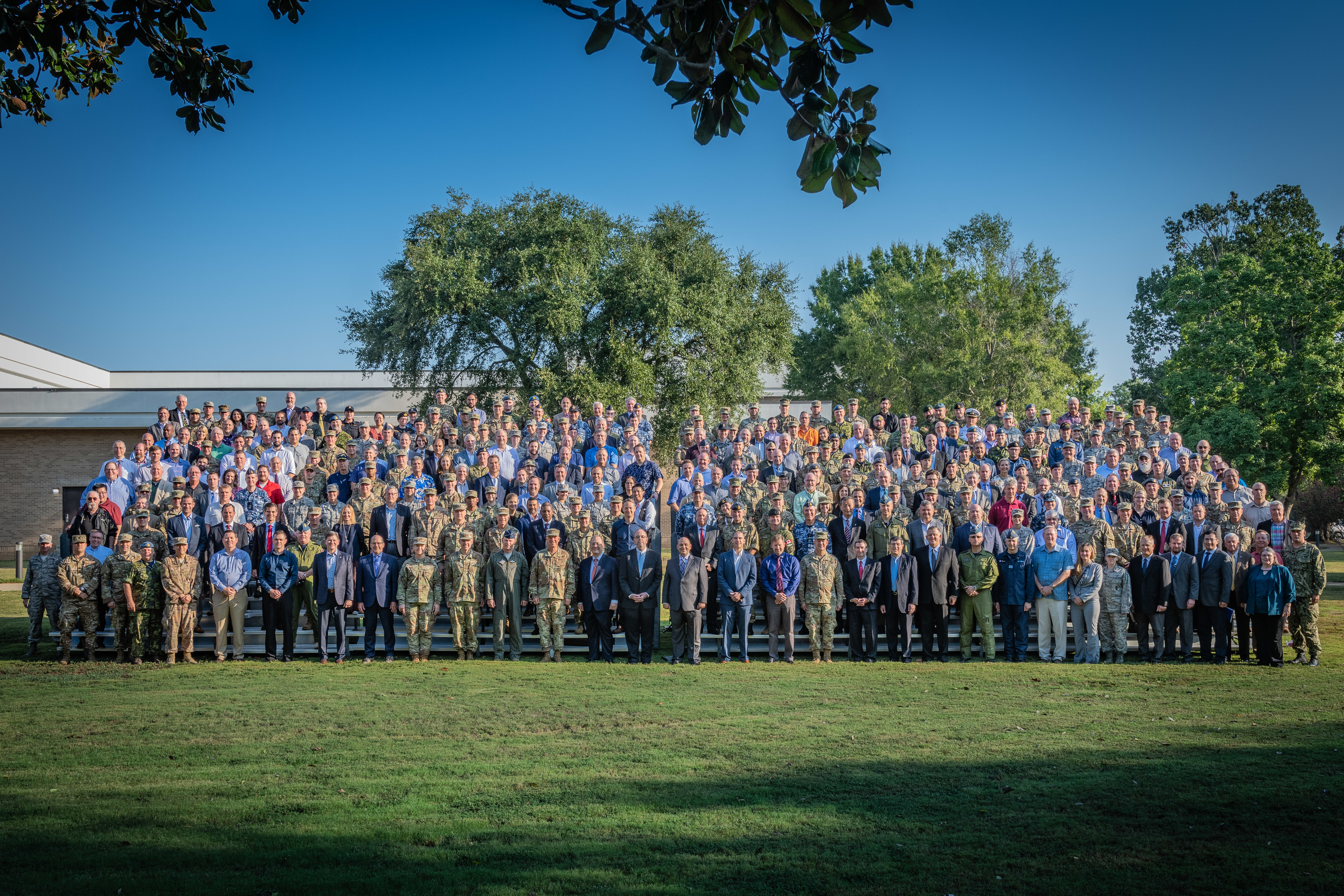
Participants in the 2019 Schriever wargame pose for a group photo.

The scenario for the 2010 Schriever wargame was set in 2022 and involved an attack by a notional "peer adversary" — representing China — that crippled U.S. cybersecurity systems in response to a United States military action in the Pacific Ocean. The 2019 Schriever wargame was set in 2029 and incorporated a scenario involving a "peer competitor seeking to achieve strategic goals by exploiting multi-domain operations". In addition to United States forces, personnel from Australia, Canada, New Zealand, and the United Kingdom also participated.

== Immaculate Constellation ==
In 2025, a self-identified whistleblower publicly alleged — following an anonymous disclosure from 2024 — that he had discovered a secret U.S. Government program involving UFOs titled Immaculate Constellation within a folder labeled "2018 Schriever Wargame". According to Jason Colavito, the self-identified whistleblower apparently mistook "fictitious wargame documents for secret UFO revelations". The 2018 Schriever wargame was set in 2028 and involved a scenario in which participants were charged with stopping an "adversary from extending or escalating a conflict into space".

== See also ==
- Michael Shellenberger
- Secret space program
- Space warfare
