= Six Degrees: Our Future on a Hotter Planet =

2007 book by Mark Lynas

- First edition
- Author: Mark Lynas
- Language: English
- Genre: Science, Non-fiction
- Publisher: Fourth Estate
- Publication date: 2007, 2008 in USA
- Publication place: Great Britain
- Media type: Print (Paperback)
- Pages: 358p.
- ISBN: 978-0-00-720905-7
- OCLC: 76359874
- Followed by: The God Species

Six Degrees: Our Future on a Hotter Planet is a 2007 non-fiction book by author Mark Lynas about global warming. The book looks and attempts to summarize results from scientific papers on climate change.

== Contents ==
The first chapter describes the expected effects of climate change with one degree Celsius (1 °C) increase in average global temperature since pre-industrial times.

The second chapter describes the effects of two degrees average temperature and so forth until Chapter 6 which shows the expected effects of an increase of six Celsius degrees (6 °C) average global temperature. The effects are also compared to paleoclimatic studies, with six degrees of warming compared back to the Cretaceous.

Special coverage is given to the positive feedback mechanisms that could dramatically accelerate climate change. The book explains how the release of methane hydrate and the release of methane from melting permafrost could unleash a major extinction event. Carbon cycle feedbacks, the demise of coral, the destruction of the Amazon rainforest, and extreme desertification are also described, with five or six degrees of warming potentially leading to the complete uninhabitability of the tropics and subtropics, as well as extreme water and food shortages, possibly leading to mass migration of billions of people.

== TV show ==
A National Geographic Channel TV programme, Six Degrees Could Change The World, was produced after the book won the Royal Society Prize in 2008.

== 2020 Update ==
In April 2020, the author published a rewritten and updated version of the book: Our Final Warning: Six Degrees of Climate Emergency (ISBN 978-0008308551).

== See also ==
- The Age of Stupid
- Environmental migrant
- Tipping point (climatology)
- Environmental issues with coral reefs
