= Jacquelyn Gill =

Paleoecologist

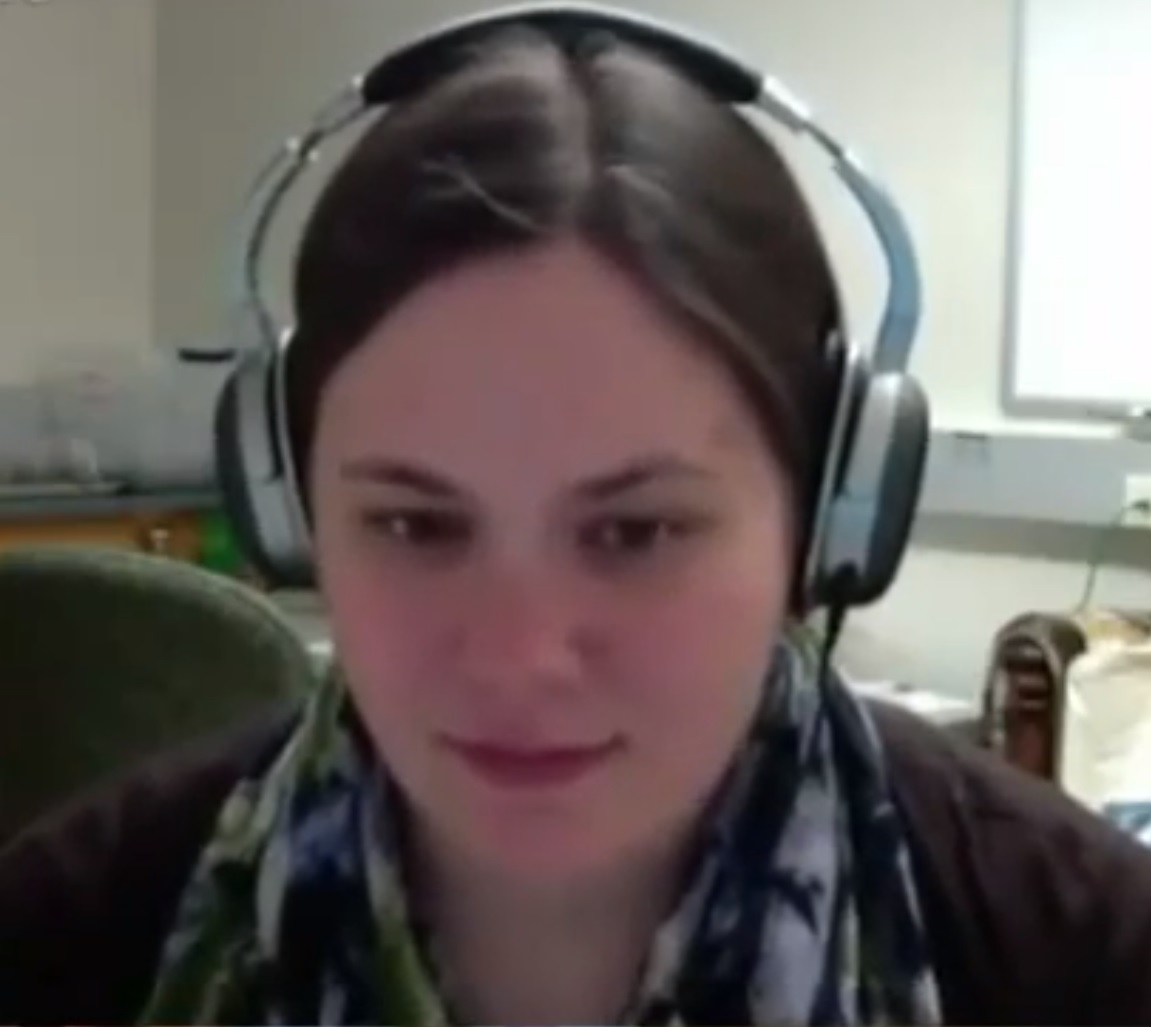
- Gill talks to Breaking Bio in 2013
- Education: University of Wisconsin-Madison, College of the Atlantic
- Employer: University of Maine
- Known for: Paleoecology

Jacquelyn Gill is a paleoecologist and assistant professor of climate science at the University of Maine. She has worked on such as the relationship between megafauna and vegetation in the Pleistocene, and the sediment cores of Jamaica. Gill is also a science communicator on climate change.

== Education ==
Gill was inspired into a scientific career whilst exploring caves in the hills of Acadia National Park, when it struck her that they had formed when the sea level was higher, and were lifted up when Maine's coast bounced back after being pushed down by the weight of Ice Age glaciers. In 2005 Gill achieved a BSc in Human Ecology at the College of the Atlantic, and studied a short course in palynology at the University of London. She then moved to the University of Wisconsin, where she completed a PhD entitled, "The biogeography of biotic upheaval: Novel plant associations and the end - Pleistocene megafaunal extinction", under the supervision of Dr John Williams in 2012. This work examined the impact of the extinction of giant Pleistocene animals on plant life. In 2008 she was the recipient of the E. Lucy Braun Award for Excellence in Ecology. In 2010 she was awarded the Ecological Society of America Cooper Award. She also received the Whitbeck Dissertator. Fellowship from the University of Wisconsin. After her PhD, Gill served as the Voss Postdoctoral Fellow at Brown University.

== Research ==
She is an Ice Age ecologist who uses natural experiments of the past to understand the impacts of climate change on the extinction and interactions of different species, communities and ecosystems. She is an assistant professor with a joint appointment in the Climate Change Institute and Biology and Ecology Department at the University of Maine. There, Gill directs the BEAST Lab for investigations on Biodiversity and Environments Across Space and Time. Using sediments and fossils from lakes and bogs, she studies climate change over the past 20,000 years. She concentrates on the Quaternary Period, an era of alternating ice ages and subsequent warm spells. Her research suggests that megaherbivores helped to make the ecosystems they live in more resistant to climate change. Her research is currently focussed on the sediment cores of Jamaica, looking to develop a 10,000 year environmental record of fire, vegetation and climate. She is involved with Project 23, which will reconstruct the food web learning how various species were connected for when they were not under climate stress.

In 2019, while filming the documentary "Lost Beasts of the Ice Age" in Siberia, Gill was hospitalized for deep vein thrombosis which manifested as multiple blood clots in both her legs and lungs. Upon recovering at a hospital in Yakutsk, Russia, she returned home to her home in Maine.

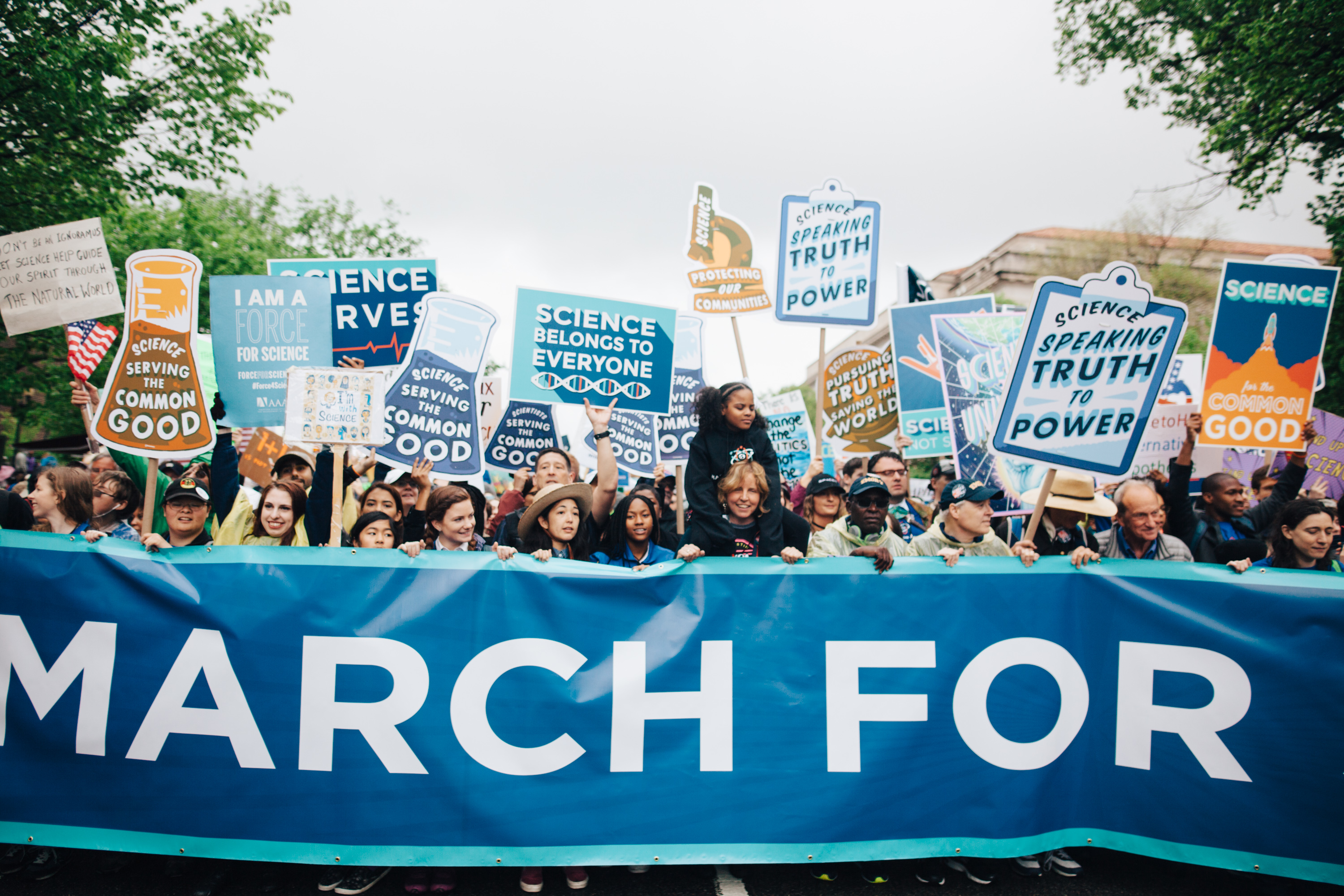
The crowd at the March for Science, Washington DC.

== Public engagement ==
Gill regularly contributes to the public understanding of climate science and conservation. She is interested in STEM diversity, how scientists embrace new media and increasing disabled access at conferences. She is the co-host of the podcast "Warm Regards" (founded July 2016) along with meteorologist Eric Holthaus and climate journalist Andy Revkin of The New York Times. When America pulled out of the Paris Climate Accord in 2017, Gill spoke up, “I hope that people don’t see this and think that all is lost". She was inspired by the Women's March in protest of the election of Donald Trump to set up a March for Science, which resulted in 600 demonstrations on April 22, 2017 (Earth Day). Gill left the organizational committee because of leaders’ resistance to address inequalities in race and gender.
