= The God Species =

2011 book by Mark Lynas

The God Species: Saving the Planet in the Age of Humans
- First edition (UK)
- Author: Mark Lynas
- Language: English
- Genre: Science, Non-fiction
- Publisher: Fourth Estate
- Publication date: 2011
- Publication place: Great Britain
- Media type: Print
- Pages: 280p.
- ISBN: 978-1426208911
- Preceded by: Six Degrees: Our Future on a Hotter Planet

The God Species: Saving the Planet in the Age of Humans (alternatively, The God Species: How the Planet Can Survive the Age of Humans (U.S.) or The God Species: How Humans Really Can Save the Planet... (paperback)) is a 2011 book by environmental writer Mark Lynas. It argues that since the Earth has entered an age—the Anthropocene—in which several of its systems are in the control of humanity, and that it is now up to humans to use this power wisely. The book challenges several beliefs usually held by environmentalists, arguing that technology like nuclear power and genetic engineering are useful and necessary tools to keep the Earth system within planetary boundaries, and that the Green movement's insistence on lifestyle changes and opposition to economic growth are unlikely to work.

== Contents ==
The book is structured around the concept of planetary boundaries as proposed by a group of Earth system scientists and environmental scientists led by Johan Rockström in 2009. Lynas describes how the idea for the book came while attending a meeting with the planetary boundaries group in Sweden.

- The biodiversity boundary.
- The climate change boundary.
- The biogeochemical boundary in the original framework has two parts: a) anthropogenic nitrogen removed from the atmosphere and b) anthropogenic phosphorus going into the oceans. Lynas focuses on the nitrogen cycle.
- The land use boundary.
- The freshwater boundary.
- The toxics boundary, referring to chemical pollution; the concentration of toxic substances, plastics, endocrine disruptors, heavy metals and radioactive contamination into the environment.
- The aerosols boundary.
- The ocean acidification boundary.
- The ozone layer boundary.
