= Wes Enzinna =

American magazine writer

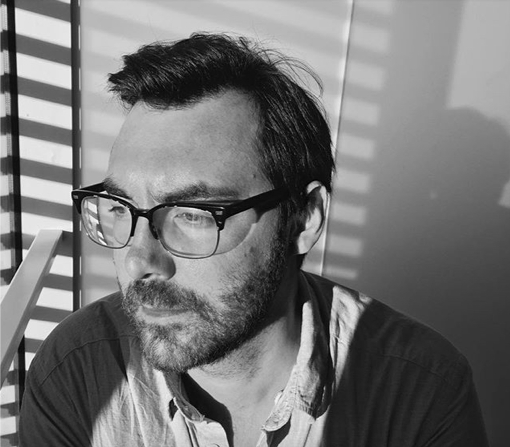
- Education: University of California, Berkeley
- Occupation: Journalist

Wes Enzinna is a journalist and literary non-fiction writer. His stories have appeared on the covers of The New York Times Magazine, New York Magazine, and Harper's. He was the deputy editor of Vice Media, a senior editor and writer at Mother Jones, and a senior editor at Harper's magazine. His international reporting has won support from the Pulitzer Center on Crisis Reporting, and he has appeared to discuss his reporting on extremism in the United States in interviews with NPR and Larry King. He is a recipient of a 2022 Whiting Award.

== Achievements and honors ==
Enzinna's work has twice been selected as notable in the Best American anthology series. He is a recipient of a Middlebury Fellowship in Environmental Reporting.
