= Michel Gelobter =

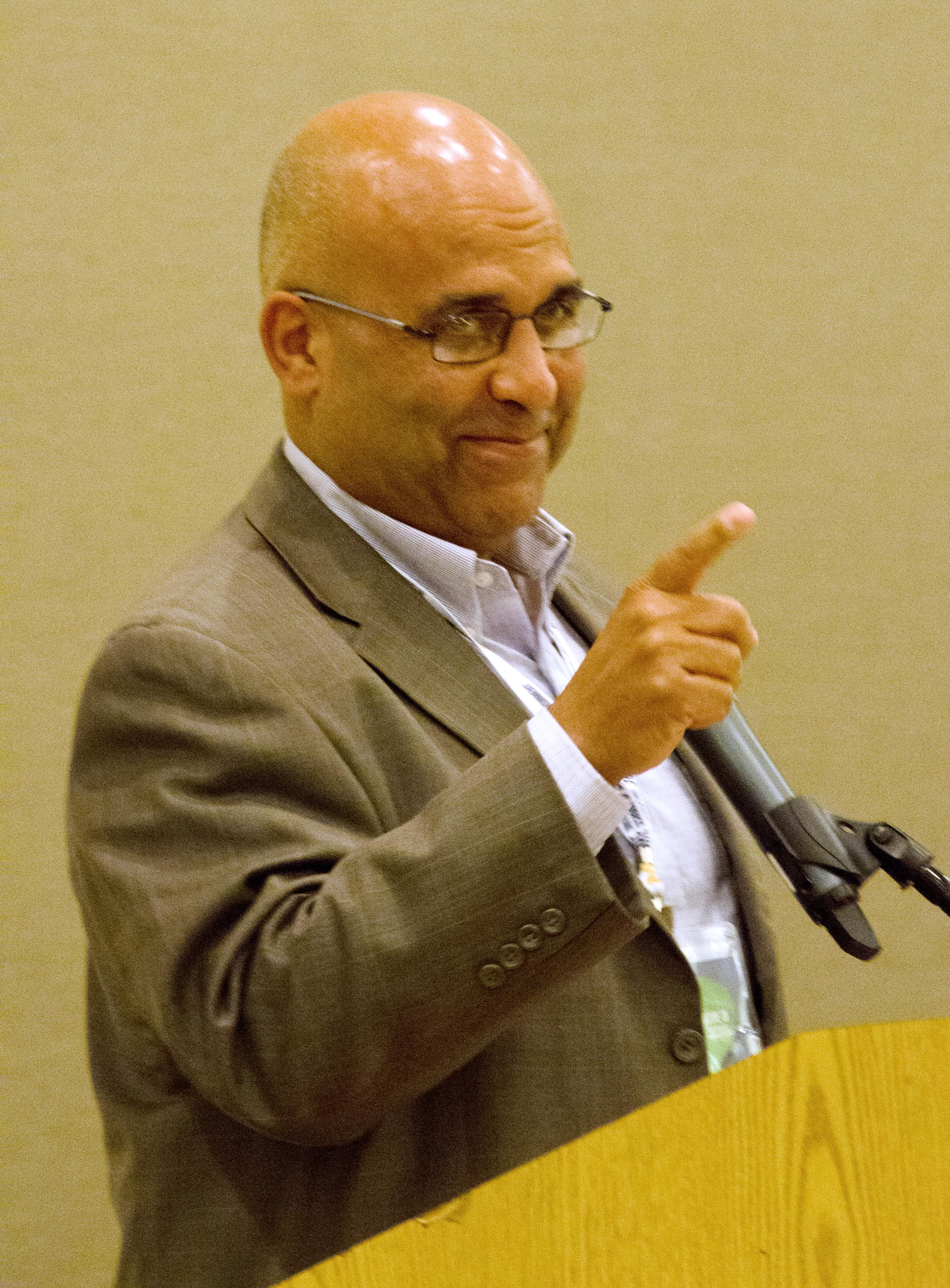
Michel Gelobter in 2012

Michel Gelobter (b. ca 1961) is an American born social entrepreneur especially in the field of clean technology, who is also known for his research into and advocacy for environmental justice and social sector innovation.

== Early life and education ==
Gelobter grew up in Flatbush, Brooklyn and on the Upper West Side of Manhattan. His father was a Polish Jew and his mother was a black Bermudan.

In 1984, Gelobter received a B.S. degree in Conservation and Resource Studies from the University of California, Berkeley after first attending Deep Springs College. He has an M.S. and a Ph.D., which he earned in 1993, from the University of California, Berkeley. His masters and doctoral research were about economic and racial inequality in the geographical distribution of air pollution. His dissertation was the first ever on environmental justice, and at Berkeley he taught the first classes ever offered in the field as well.

== Career ==
After graduating, Gelobter worked for the House of Representatives' Energy and Commerce Committee, chaired by John Dingell, and then served in the government of the City of New York under Mayor David Dinkins as Director of Environmental Quality. He then became founding Director of the Environmental Policy Program at Columbia University's School of International and Public Affairs, where he was appointed an assistant professor. Next, he became a professor in the public administration department at Rutgers University.

In 2001 he moved back to California and became executive director of an environmental think tank called Redefining Progress. As part of that organization he advocated for California to adopt strong regulation of greenhouse gases through market mechanisms, which contributed to the passing of the Global Warming Solutions Act of 2006.

In 2007 he founded Cooler, a social venture that originally intended to launch a carbon offset credit card, and then offered two services – one to consumers to provide carbon offsets for goods they bought online, and the other partnering with online retailers to help them source carbon neutral goods to sell, using a model to calculate the carbon footprint of the goods. He then joined Hara, a Kleiner Perkins Caufield & Byers-backed company that developed and sold environmental management systems, as its Chief Green Officer, and then co-founded BuildingEnergy.com, a cloud-based building energy management business.

After that, he started to work with the David and Lucile Packard Foundation to develop prize-based methods to find solutions to address global warming in the developing world, and joined Infoedge, a management consulting firm, where he directed their energy and innovation practices. He is a member of the board of trustees of Ceres. He founded the Green Leadership Trust, served on the board of trustees of the Natural Resources Defense Council, and was a member of the advisory board of Al Gore's Alliance for Climate Protection. He has been a guest speaker at Singularity University, and spoke at the 2016 The Lean Startup Conference. He also lectures at the University of California, Berkeley.

=== Advocacy ===
Gelobter has urged others to start businesses in the clean technology sector, in order to create, develop, and validate successful business models. He argues that clean technology companies survive by providing services to companies in the rest of the economy, and if a clean technology company is making money, it does so by helping other kinds of companies make more money as well – in other words, it uses sound environmental practices that are also economically sound and sustainable.

Gelobter and eight other authors with an environmental justice perspective responded to the 2005 essay, The Death of Environmentalism: Global Warming Politics in a Post-Environmental World, by Michael Shellenberger and Ted Nordhaus – which asserted that the environmental movement is unable to fully address climate change – with the essay, The Soul of Environmentalism: Rediscovering transformational politics in the 21st century. They argued that Shellenberger and Nordhaus had adopted a framework ("death of") commonly used to introduce conservative thinking to new domains ("death of poetry", "death of history"), and that those authors had omitted the perspectives, frameworks, and history of the non-white poor. The essay pointed to how the environmental movement could be strengthened by allying with social justice and civil rights movements.

== Works and publications ==
- Gelobter, Michel (1992). "Chapter 5: Toward a Model of "Environmental Discrimination"". In Bryant, Bunyan; Mohai, Paul (eds.). Race and the Incidence of Environmental Hazards: A Time for Discourse. Westview Press. ISBN 9780813385136.
- Michel, Gelobter (1993). "The Meaning of Urban Environmental Justice". Fordham Urban Law Journal. 21 (3).
- Esnard, Ann-Margaret; Gelobter, Michel; Morales, Xavier (November 2001). "Environmental Justice, GIS, and Pedagogy". Cartographica. 38 (3–4): 53–61. doi:10.3138/3267-H048-1409-7518.
- Gelobter, Michel; Dorsey, Michael; Fields, Leslie; Goldtooth, Tom; Mendiratta, Anuja; Moore, Richard; Morello-Frosch, Rachel; Shepard, Peggy M.; Torres, Gerald (27 May 2005). "The Soul of Environmentalism Rediscovering transformational politics in the 21st century". Grist. Archived from the original on 11 July 2005.; a response to Nordhaus, Ted; Shellenberger, Michael (14 January 2005). "The death of environmentalism: Global warming politics in a post-environmental world". Grist.
- Cordova, R.; Gelobter, M.; Hoerner, A.; Love, J. R.; Miller, A.; Saenger, C; Zaidi, D (January 2006). "2006. Climate Change in California: Health, Economic and Equity Impacts. Redefining Progress" (PDF). Redefining Progress.
- Gelobter, Michel; Gonzalez, Antonio (August 30, 2006). "Global warming is a Latino issue". East Bay Times.
- Gelobter, Michel (2015). Lean Startups For Social Change. Berrett-Koehler. ISBN 9781626561519.

=== Interviews ===
- Environmental Careers Organization (2004). "A Conversation with Michel Gelobter". The ECO Guide to Careers that Make a Difference: Environmental Work For A Sustainable World. Island Press. pp. 159–175. ISBN 9781559639675.
- Gelobter, Michel; Lerza, Catherine (2006). "Changing the Social Climate: A Conversation" (PDF). Tide Foundation.
- Baya, Vinod; Parker, Bo (2011). "Managing energy for sustainability: Interview with Amit Chatterjee and Michel Gelobter" (PDF). PWC Technology Forecast (4): 52–55.
