= Climate Feedback =

Fact-checking website for climate change

- Website type: Fact-checking website
- Owner: Science Feedback
- Website: climatefeedback.org (former, active) (Official website; current site)
- Current status: Active

Climate Feedback (CF) is a web-based content annotation tool that allows qualified scientists to comment on stories online, adding context and noting inaccuracies. It is one of three websites under the Science Feedback parent organization that fact-checks media coverage. Science Feedback is a non-profit organization registered in France.

The CF website asks climate scientists in relevant fields to assess the credibility and accuracy of media stories related to climate change. The website published its first review in 2015. The website was founded by Emmanuel Vincent, who has a PhD in Oceanography & Climate from Université Pierre et Marie Curie. Vincent partnered with the non-profit Hypothes.is, who created a free web browser plug-in that allows users to make sentence-level comments on web pages, to create an evaluation of content. Climate Feedback, an application of the Hypothes.is platform to climate science communication, allows active climate scientists to add comments.

== Process ==
Typically, a story will be reviewed for CF by five or six scientists, but on one story there were 17 reviewers. According to Climate Feedback, each reviewer has to hold a PhD in a relevant discipline, and have at least one published article on climate science or climate change impacts in a top-tier peer-reviewed scientific journal within the last five years. However, summaries are written by an editor rather than by a reviewer.

The method was called "expert crowdsourcing" or a form of "elevated crowdsourcing" by Poynter's International Fact-Check Network.

Vincent believes this methodology can be applied to fact-checking not only climate change, but also health and energy information.

== History ==
The website published its first review in March 2015. In 2016, Climate Feedback raised about $30,000 with Indigogo crowdfunding, which bolstered one of the efforts to conduct fact-checking via web annotation. Others like PolitiFact have also been experimenting with annotation methods for politicians’ posts on the blogging platform Medium, using a $140,000 grant from the Knight Foundation.

In 2017 Dana Nuccitelli, in a Guardian article on the role of denialist blogs in undermining public acceptance of anthropogenic global warming, described Climate Feedback as "a highly respected and influential resource."

The website has identified errors in content published by outlets, such as Fox News, The Wall Street Journal, The Mail on Sunday and New York magazine. The website is included in the database of global fact-checking sites by the Reporters' Lab at Duke University. Currently, Emmanuel Vincent serves as director.

As a project of the Science Feedback non-profit organization, Climate Feedback reviews are used in Facebook's fact-checking partnership to identify false news articles and show them lower in its News Feed. Science Feedback is annually certified by the International Fact Checking Network at the Poynter Institute. Health Feedback, another Science Feedback project, is a member of the World Health Organization's Vaccine Safety Net.

In 2024, Science Feedback integrated the Climate Feedback and Health Feedback websites into its main site and launched a French-language version.

In September 2021, journalist John Stossel filed a libel lawsuit against Facebook, along with Climate Feedback and Science Feedback, for labeling two of his videos on climate change "misleading" and "partly false". Stossel's lawsuit said the labels misrepresented his views. A judge dismissed Stossel's lawsuit in October 2022, ruling that the labels were First Amendment-protected statements of opinion.

Climate Feedback and Skeptical Science are used to develop CLIMINATOR, an artificial intelligence that debunks climate misinformation.

== See also ==
- Climate change denial
