= T. J. Demos =

American art historian

T.J. Demos is an American art historian and cultural critic who writes on contemporary art and visual culture, particularly in relation to globalization, politics, migration and ecology. Currently a Professor in the Department of History of Art and Visual Culture (HAVC) at UC Santa Cruz, and the founding director of the Center for Creative Ecologies, he is the author of several books, including Against the Anthropocene: Visual Culture and Environment Today (Sternberg Press, 2017), Decolonizing Nature: Contemporary Art and the Politics of Ecology (Sternberg Press, 2016), The Migrant Image: The Art and Politics of Documentary during Global Crisis (Duke University Press, 2013), and Return to the Postcolony: Spectres of Colonialism in Contemporary Art (Sternberg Press, 2013). Previous to his current appointment, Demos taught at University College London between 2005-2015.

Demos has also curated a number of art exhibitions, including Rights of Nature: Art and Ecology in the Americas in 2010 and Uneven Geographies: Art and Globalisation in 2015, both at Nottingham Contemporary (both co-curated with Alex Farqharson); Specters: A Cinema of Haunting at the Reina Sofia Museum in Madrid in 2014; and Zones of Conflict, at Pratt Manhattan Gallery in New York in 2008.

== Education and career ==
Demos received his PhD in 2000 from Columbia University. His first book, which emerged from his doctoral thesis, was The Exiles of Marcel Duchamp (MIT Press, 2007). It situates Duchamp’s mixed-media projects, such as La Boîte-en-valise, and his installations, including the 1938 Surrealist exhibition in Paris, in the context of the early twentieth century’s world wars and nationalist formations. The text argues that Duchamp’s practice brought about an aesthetic negotiation of the experiences of geopolitical dislocation.

== Writing ==
Demos’ work focuses on the intersection of contemporary art and politics (particularly in the areas of photography and moving-image art), and considers the ways that art is capable of inventing creative and critical approaches that analyze, defy, and provide alternatives to reigning political, social, and economic forms of neoliberal globalization. His recent writing investigates contemporary art’s relation to environmental crisis, and he recently guest-edited a special issue of the journal Third Text on "Contemporary Art and the Politics of Ecology" (no. 120, January 2013), and has written several essays on the subject, such as “The Post-Natural Condition” in Artforum

=== The Migrant Image: The Art and Politics of Documentary during Global Crisis ===
This book looks at contemporary artists who have turned to documentary practice in order to investigate the mobile lives of migrants, refugees, stateless persons, and the politically dispossessed. His analysis considers the work of artists from Europe, the United States, the Middle East, and North Africa, which portrays the frequently negative conditions of neoliberal globalization, and which connects viewers to the lived experiences of economic and political crisis. The text includes close readings of works by Steve McQueen, The Otolith Group, Emily Jacir, Hito Steyerl Ahlam Shibli, Joana Hadjithomas and Khalil Joreige, Ursula Biemann, Lamia Joreige, Rabih Mroué, Walid Raad, Yto Barrada, Ayreen Anastas and Rene Gabri, Goldin+Senneby. It argues that these artists propose innovative ways to approach a politics of social justice and equality, and historical consciousness, even while operating in an aesthetic domain that is post-representational and deterritorialized.

=== Return to the Postcolony: Specters of Colonialism in Contemporary Art ===
This text examines the video and photographic projects by Sven Augustijnen, Vincent Meessen, Zarina Bhimji, Renzo Martens, and Pieter Hugo. The book traces the work of these artists who have each travelled to former European colonies in Sub-Saharan Africa in recent years in order to investigate past and present traumas and injustices, resulting in projects that were also made around the time of the 50th anniversary of the independence of numerous African countries. Addressing the larger context of failed states, increasing socio-political and economic inequality, and the continuing US-led military campaigns for security, resources, and economic supremacy worldwide, the book contends that artists today are critically investigating the aesthetics and image systems of neoliberalism and global crisis. Arguing that the past colonial experience continues to haunt those living in the present, but lies repressed, the book considers these artists’ voyages as constituting a “reverse migration,” a return to the African postcolony, “which drives an ethico-political as well as an aesthetic set of imperatives: to learn to live with ghosts, but to do so more justly.” (back cover).

=== Dara Birnbaum: Technology/Transformation: Wonder Woman ===
Demos reads Birnbaum's video art in relation to media theory, postmodernist appropriation aesthetics, and the politics of feminism, and considers the pioneering attempts of the artist to develop the transformative capabilities of the medium of video.

=== The Exiles of Marcel Duchamp ===
Demos' text analyses the artist’s installations and conceptual mixed-media pieces – such as his La Boîte-en-valise, which Duchamp called his “portable museum.” The book places these project in relation to the aesthetic and geopolitical dislocations of early twentieth-century nationalisms and world war.

== Recognition ==
In 2014, Demos was awarded the prestigious Frank Jewett Mather Award for art criticism from the College Art Association.

== Bibliography ==
- Against the Anthropocene: Visual Culture and Environment Today (Sternberg Press, 2017). ISBN 978-3-95679-210-6
- Decolonizing Nature: Contemporary Art and the Politics of Ecology (Sternberg Press, 2016). ISBN 978-3-95679-094-2
- The Migrant Image: The Art and Politics of Documentary during Global Crisis (Duke University Press, 2013). ISBN 0822353407
- Return to the Postcolony: Specters of Colonialism in Contemporary Art (Sternberg Press, 2013). ISBN 978-3-943365-42-9
- Dara Birnbaum: Technology/Transformation: Wonder Woman (Afterall Books, 2010). ISBN 1846380677
- The Exiles of Marcel Duchamp (MIT Press, 2007). ISBN 0262518112
- In and Out of Brussels: Figuring Postcolonial Africa and Europe in the Films of Herman Asselberghs, Sven Augustijnen, Renzo Martens, and Els Opsomer, ed. T.J. Demos and Hilde Van Gelder (Leuven: Leuven University Press, 2012). ISBN 9058679195
- "Art After Nature: The Post-Natural Condition," Artforum (April 2012), 191-97.
- “The Politics of Sustainability: Contemporary Art and Ecology,” Radical Nature: Art and Architecture for a Changing Planet 1969–2009, Barbican Art Gallery, London, 2009. ISBN 3865606083
