= Eric Holthaus =

American meteorologist and climate journalist

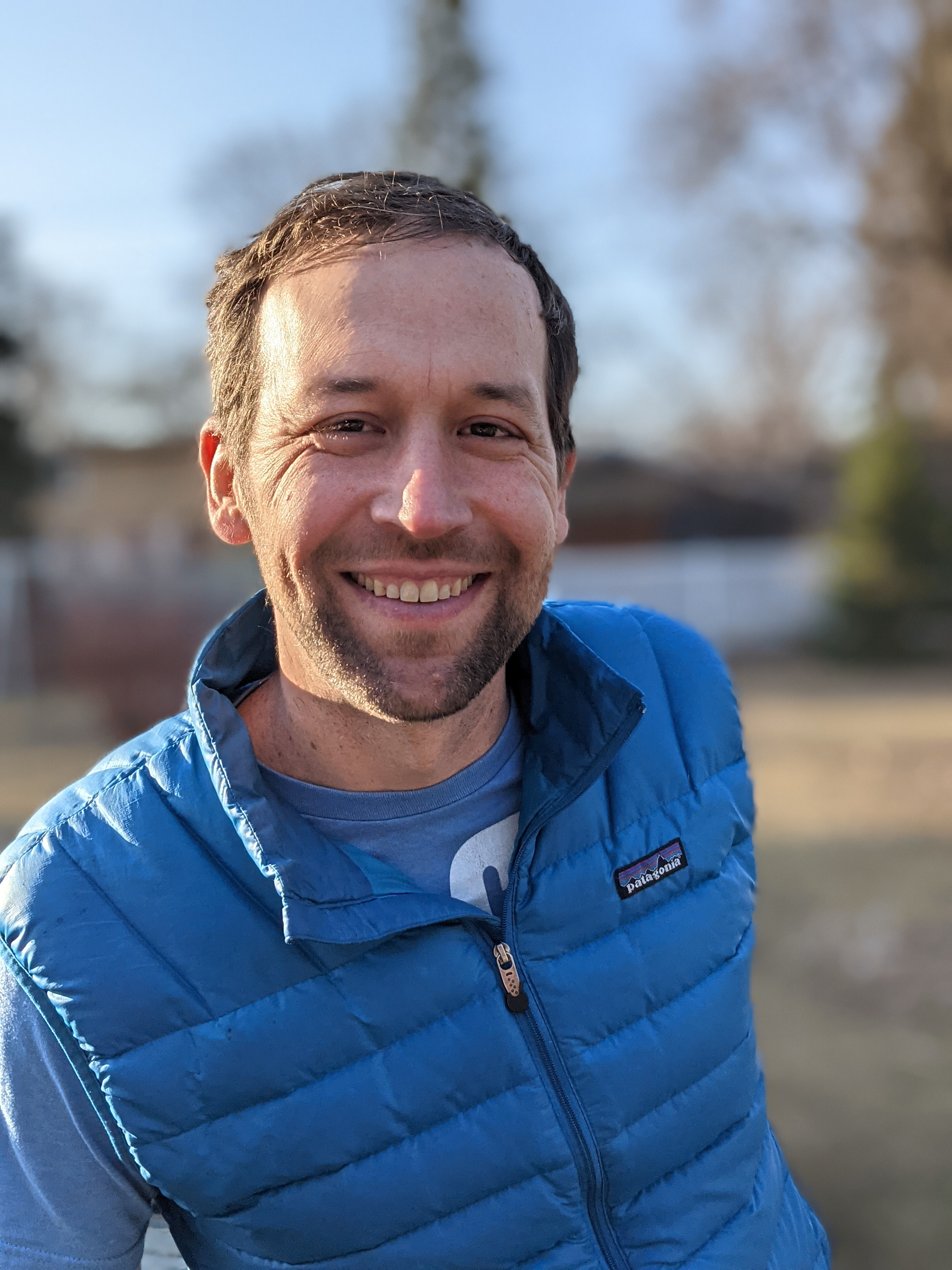
- Holthaus in 2021
- Born: 1981 (age 44–45)
- Occupations: Meteorologist and Climate journalist
- Employer(s): Currently; The Phoenix (on Ghost)
- Known for: Environmental activism
- Website: ericholthaus.com

Eric Holthaus (born 1981) is an American meteorologist and climate journalist. He is the founder of a weather service called Currently and started a publication called The Phoenix on Ghost. He was formerly a writer for The Correspondent, Grist, Slate and The Wall Street Journal and is known for his mentions of global climate change.

== Biography ==
Eric Holthaus grew up in Kansas. His writing during Hurricane Sandy resulted in a substantial following. During his career, he has advised numerous groups and individuals on coping with changing weather, including, for example, Ethiopian subsistence farmers. In 2013, feeling that his extensive air travel was contributing to the climate problem, Holthaus vowed to stop flying.

Holthaus is a co-founder of the podcast "Warm Regards" with paleoecologist Jacquelyn Gill and journalist Andy Revkin of The New York Times.

Holthaus left The Correspondent in November 2020 and started The Phoenix; The Correspondent itself ceased publication on January 1, 2021. He is a proponent of the Green New Deal and identifies as an eco-socialist.

== Projects ==
On November 6, 2022, Abbie Veitch and Eric Holthaus announced Project Mushroom, an initiative to create a safe social media service centered on climate protection. The proposed service was to be run by users and its formation was in response to the harmful effects and biases embedded in established platforms like Twitter. The Kickstarter campaign for the project raised $201,989. In April 2023, Holthaus turned over ownership of the service to volunteers from its community.

== The Future Earth ==
Holthaus's book The Future Earth, about imagining a future where society has reversed the effects of climate change, was released on June 30, 2020. The book employs a "speculative journalism" approach to imagine how communities and society will respond, while interviewing and using sources from contemporary thinkers and scientists. Holthaus focuses on the large scale organizing and social change needed to address the climate crisis rather than relying solely on technological solutions.

Reception of the book was generally positive. Kirkus reviews called the book "an encouraging and diligently researched call to action" Undark Magazine called the book "a welcome antidote to more dystopian climate writers such as David Wallace-Wells". The podcast Warm Regards highlighted the book in comparison with Kim Stanley Robinson's The Ministry for the Future—noting that they both share a similarly optimistic and future forward approach to the climate crisis.
