= Erle Ellis =

American environmental scientist

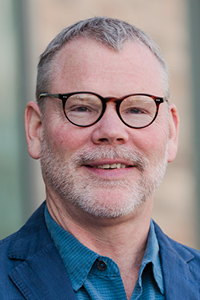
- Ellis in 2021
- Born: March 11, 1963
- Education: Cornell University
- Scientific career
- Fields: Environmental geography
- Workplaces: University of Maryland, Baltimore County
- Doctoral advisor: Roger M. Spanswick

Erle Christopher Ellis (born 11 March 1963 in Washington, DC) is an American environmental scientist. Ellis's work investigates the causes and consequences of long-term ecological changes caused by humans at local to global scales, including those related to the Anthropocene. As of 2015 he is a professor of Geography and Environmental Systems at the University of Maryland, Baltimore County where he directs the Laboratory for Anthroecology.

== Education and career ==
Ellis received an A.B. in Biology in 1986 and a Ph.D. in Plant Biology from Cornell University in 1990 with Roger Spanswick. After receiving his Ph.D., Ellis taught English at Nanjing Agricultural University in 1990/1991, and returned to China to study nitrogen cycling in China's village landscapes from 1993-1996. From 1996 to 2000, he worked with Stephen Gliessman at the University of California, Santa Cruz. In 2000 he was hired as an assistant professor in the department of Geography and Environmental Systems of the University of Maryland, Baltimore County; he was promoted to professor in 2015. He is a lead author of the Visions chapter of the IPBES Transformative Change Assessment (2024), a visiting fellow at the Oxford Martin School (2023/2024), a fellow of the Global Land Programme (Scientific Steering Committee 2012-2017) of Future Earth, a former member of the Anthropocene Working Group of the International Commission on Stratigraphy, a Senior Fellow at the Breakthrough Institute (and coauthor of the Ecomodernist Manifesto), and an advisor to the Nature Needs Half movement. He has taught ecology as a visiting professor at the Harvard Graduate School of Design (2013-2015) and was a visiting professor at the Carnegie Institution's Department of Global Ecology (2006/2007).

== Work ==
Ellis' research has explored long-term ecological changes in China's villages, and in 2008, he produced the first global map of anthropogenic biomes (and coined the term "anthrome") together with Navin Ramankutty. In 2019, he helped to lead a massive collaboration of archaeologists to map land use changes around the world over the past 10,000 years.

Ellis has published more than 100 scientific articles relating to global and local ecological changes caused by humans, and is a Global Highly Cited Researcher (Cross-Field, 2018, 2019, 2020). He has also written a number of articles and opinions communicating his work and other matters relating to humans as agents of ecological change, at Science, Nature, PNAS, New Scientist, The New York Times, Breakthrough Journal, and other venues. His first book, Anthropocene: A Very Short Introduction, was published in 2018.

== Awards ==
- 2021-2024 Presidential Research Professor, UMBC.
- 2019 Innovation in Sustainability Science Award, Ecological Society of America.
