= Julie Sze =

American studies professor

Academic background
- Education: New York University
- Thesis: Noxious New York : the racial politics of urban health and environmental justice (2003)

Julie Sze is Professor of American Studies at University of California, Davis. Her research deals with environmental justice, inequality and culture; race, gender and power; and community health and activism.

== Education ==
Sze grew up in the Chinatown neighborhood of New York City. She received her B.A. from the University of California, Berkeley in 1995. Sze earned her Ph.D. in American Studies from New York University in 2003. She then joined the faculty at the University of California, Davis where she was promoted to full professor in 2015.

== Career ==
She is the author of three books: Noxious New York: The Racial Politics of Urban Health and Environmental Justice (MIT Press, 2007), for which she won the 2008 John Hope Franklin Prize, Fantasy Islands: Chinese Dreams and Ecological Fears in an Age of Climate Crisis (University of California Press, 2015), and Environmental Justice in a Moment of Danger (University of California Press, 2020). The latter offers a “primer” on activism for environmental justice.

== Selected publications ==
- Sze, Julie (2007). Noxious New York: The Racial Politics of Urban Health and Environmental Justice (Urban and industrial environments). MIT Press. OCLC 940869417.
- Sze, Julie (2015). Fantasy islands: Chinese dreams and ecological fears in an age of climate crisis. OCLC 942228092.
- Sze, Julie (2020). Environmental justice in a moment of danger. University of California Press. ISBN 978-0-520-30073-6. OCLC 1108786678.
