= Ecomodernism =

Environmental movement emphasizing technological innovation for sustainability

Ecomodernism is an environmental philosophy which argues that technological development can protect nature and improve human wellbeing through eco-economic decoupling, i.e., by separating economic growth from environmental impacts.

== Description ==
Ecomodernism embraces substituting natural ecological services with energy, technology, and synthetic solutions as long as they help reduce impact on environment.

Debates that form the foundation of ecomodernism were born from disappointment in traditional organizations who denied use of advanced technologies such as nuclear power thus leading to an increase of reliance of fossil gas and increase of emissions instead of reduction (e.g. Energiewende). Coming from evidence-based, scientific and pragmatic positions, ecomodernism engages in the debate on how to best protect natural environments, how to accelerate decarbonization to mitigate climate change, and how to accelerate the economic and social development of the world's poor. In these debates, ecomodernism distinguishes itself from other schools of thought, including ecological economics, degrowth, population reduction, laissez-faire economics, the "soft energy" path, and central planning. Ecomodernism draws on American pragmatism, political ecology, evolutionary economics, and modernism. Diversity of ideas and dissent are claimed values in order to avoid the intolerance born of extremism and dogmatism.

Ecomodernist ideas have been associated in the United States with the California-based Breakthrough Institute and internationally with WePlanet NGO. While the word 'ecomodernism' has only been used to describe modernist environmentalism since 2013, the term has a longer history in academic design writing from Peter Fine and Eric Benson and Ecomodernist ideas were developed within a number of earlier texts, including Martin Lewis's Green Delusions, Stewart Brand's Whole Earth Discipline and Emma Marris's Rambunctious Garden. In their 2015 manifesto, 18 self-professed ecomodernists—including scholars from the Breakthrough Institute, Harvard University, Jadavpur University, and the Long Now Foundation—sought to clarify the movement's vision: "we affirm one long-standing environmental ideal, that humanity must shrink its impacts on the environment to make more room for nature, while we reject another, that human societies must harmonize with nature to avoid economic and ecological collapse."

Key among the goals of an ecomodern environmental ethic is the use of technology to intensify human activity and make more room for wild nature. Among other things, ecomodernists embrace:

- High-tech farming techniques to produce more food using less land and water, thus freeing up areas for conservation. This might include precision agriculture, vertical farming, regenerative agriculture, genetically modified foods, cellular agriculture (cultured meat), alternative proteins, fish from aquaculture farms.
- Desalination, water conservation and water purification technologies.
- Advanced waste recycling and circular economy.
- Sustainable forestry and ecological restoration of natural habitats and biodiversity which includes a wide scope of projects including erosion control, reforestation, removal of non-native species and weeds, revegetation of degraded lands, daylighting streams, the reintroduction of native species (preferably native species that have local adaptation), and habitat and range improvement for targeted species.
- Building Information Modeling in green building, green building and green infrastructure, smart grids, resource efficiency, urbanization, smart city, urban density and verticalization, adoption of electric vehicles and hydrogen vehicles.
- Drone light shows, projection mapping and 3D holograms to provide sustainable and technological alternatives to fireworks.
- Automation
- Carbon capture and storage and direct air capture.
- Green nanotechnology (nanofilters for water purification, nanomaterials for air pollution control, nanocatalysts for more efficient chemical processes, nanostructured materials for improved solar cells, nanomaterials for enhancing battery performance, nanoparticles for soil and groundwater remediation and nanosensors for detecting pollutants)
- Energy storage
- Alternative materials such as bioplastics and bio-based materials and high-tech materials such as graphene and carbon fibers.
- Clean energy transition i.e. replacing low power-density energy sources (e.g. firewood in low-income countries, which leads to deforestation) with high power-density sources as long as their net impact on environment is lower (nuclear power plants, and advanced renewable energy sources).
- Artificial intelligence for resource optimization (predictive maintenance in industrial settings to reduce waste, optimized routing for transportation to reduce fuel consumption, AI-driven climate modeling for better environmental predictions and supply chain optimization to reduce transportation emissions).
- Climate engineering
- Synthetic fuels and biofuels
- 3D printing and 3D food printing
- Digitalization, miniaturization, servitization of products and dematerialization

== Origin of Ecomodernism ==
Ecomodernism did not appear suddenly. It grew out of several decades of thinking about how humanity can improve its quality of life while reducing pressure on the environment. The movement emerged because many researchers and environmental thinkers began to notice a pattern. In some areas, modern technologies were actually helping nature recover, rather than harming it.

The roots of ecomodernism go back to ideas from the 1980s and 1990s, when some scholars argued that environmental protection did not always require stopping economic growth. Instead, they suggested that cleaner technology, better planning, and smarter use of energy could allow modern societies to “use less to make more” This idea was later called decoupling, meaning that human well-being could rise while environmental impact fell.

During the 1990s and 2000s, a number of writers and scientists helped shape this mindset. Figures like Jesse Ausubel, Vaclav Smil, and Stewart Brand pointed out long-term trends showing that many countries were using less land, less energy, and fewer materials per person as technology advanced. These trends suggested that modernization was not always the enemy of nature but it could sometimes protect it. At the same time, some environmental thinkers in the United States began to argue that traditional environmentalism had become too focused on limits, regulations, or pessimistic messages. Instead, they believed that solutions such as clean energy, high-yield farming, dense cities, and advanced materials could allow people to thrive while shrinking the human footprint on nature. This group, many of whom later became associated with the Breakthrough Institute, played an important role in forming what would become ecomodernism.

By the early 2010s, these ideas were coming together into a clearer vision. Supporters of this emerging approach believed that:

- Cities allow humans to live well while using less land.
- High-yield agriculture can spare forests and habitats.
- Nuclear and renewable energy can reduce carbon emissions.
- New technologies can replace older, more destructive ways of producing goods.

These beliefs formed the basis of what became known as ecomodernism.

== An Ecomodernist Manifesto ==
In April 2015, a group of 18 self-described ecomodernists collectively published An Ecomodernist Manifesto. The manifesto argued that humans can “decouple” from nature through technology and eventually leave more of the planet for wildlife and ecosystems.

== Reception and criticism ==
Some environmental journalists have praised An Ecomodernist Manifesto. At The New York Times, Eduardo Porter wrote approvingly of ecomodernism's alternative approach to sustainable development. In an article titled "Manifesto Calls for an End to 'People Are Bad' Environmentalism", Slate's Eric Holthaus wrote "It's inclusive, it's exciting, and it gives environmentalists something to fight for for a change." The science journal Nature editorialized the manifesto.

Ecomodernism has been criticized for inadequately recognizing what Holly Jean Buck, Assistant Professor of Environment and Sustainability, says is the exploitative, violent and unequal dimensions of technological modernisation. Sociologist Eileen Crist, Associate Professor Emerita, observed that ecomodernism is founded on a western philosophy of humanism with no regard to "nonhuman freedoms". Of the Manifesto Crist says

the mass extinction of life forms that the human enterprise has set into motion receives no mention in the Manifesto. (And extinction of species is mentioned once.) This is a startling omission for an eco manifesto: mass extinctions are geologically rare and catastrophic events; following such past cataclysms, it took millions of years for biological diversity to rebound—a timescale irrelevant for all future human generations. And yet the omission of mass extinction makes sense from the Manifesto's point of view.

Human Geographer Rosemary-Claire Collard and co-authors assert that ecomodernism is incompatible with neoliberal capitalism, despite the philosophy's claims to the contrary. By contrast, in his book "Ecomodernism: Technology, Politics and the Climate Crisis" Jonathan Symons argues that ecomodernism belongs in the social democratic tradition, promoting a third way between laissez-faire and anti-capitalism, and calling for transformative state investments in technological transformation and human development. Likewise, in "A sympathetic diagnosis of the Ecomodernist Manifesto", Paul Robbins and Sarah A. Moore describe the similarities and points of departure between ecomodernism and political ecology.

Another major strand of criticism towards ecomodernism comes from proponents of degrowth or the steady-state economy. Eighteen ecological economists published a long rejoinder titled "A Degrowth Response to an Ecomodernist Manifesto", writing "the ecomodernists provide neither a very inspiring blueprint for future development strategies nor much in the way of solutions to our environmental and energy woes."

At the Breakthrough Institute's annual Dialogue in June 2015, several environmental scholars offered a critique of ecomodernism. Bruno Latour argued that the modernity celebrated in An Ecomodernist Manifesto is a myth. Jenny Price argued that the manifesto offered a simplistic view of "humanity" and "nature", which she said are "made invisible" by talking about them in such broad terms.

The Ecomodernist philosophy invites a very techno-optimistic outlook towards the environment and in the “Techno-Optimist Manifesto” a 2023 self-published essay by venture capitalist Marc Andreessen states that many significant problems of humanity have been solved with the development of technology, particularly technology without any constraints, and that we should do everything possible to accelerate technology development and advancement. The philosophy from Ecomodernist Manifesto stresses on the viewpoint that climate change and other global ecological challenges are not the most important immediate concerns for the majority of the world’s people. So the richer and more urbanised nations become, the less their people care about their environmental impact, notes George Monbiot in the article "Meet the ecomodernists: ignorant of history and paradoxically old-fashioned". So, ‘Limits, ecomodernism and degrowth’ that the concern is more dependent on a modernist ‘fix’ mentality that searches for salvation in technology, Giorgos Kallis says.

In this techno-optimist nature, ecomodernists are decoupling humans from nature and the dependence upon it. But there is a risk here of what Rob Wallace calls ‘red washing capital’: justifying real-existing technologies and the relations that produce them, with the excuse that in some undefined future, a hypothetical socialism could put them to good use.

While ecomodernists see human technology as capable of transcending ecological and energetic limits, Clive Hamilton in his “Growth Fetish” mentions this ideology as the essential for the reproduction of the capitalist system, one that perpetuates and reproduces the unequal relations of exchange and enables the international capitalist class to capture embodied labor and energy in pursuit of accumulation and growth. This is also not very far away from Chris Smaje’s argument published on the Dark Mountain website, “modernisation” of the kind they celebrate may have liberated many people from bondage, oppression and hard labour, but it has also subjected many to the same forces. Cindy Isenhour in her article “Ecomodernism and contrasting definitions of technological progress in the Anthropocene” mentions that perhaps the contemporary moment calls for a reconceptualization of progress, one that recognizes the capacity of technology to mystify unequal relations of exchange and the shifting of environmental burdens in a highly unequal global society.

== See also ==
- Bright green environmentalism
- Earthship
- Ecological civilization
- Ecological modernization
- Environmental technology
- Pro-nuclear movement
- Reflexive modernization
- Solarpunk
- Technogaianism
- Utopian architecture
- Nuclear power proposed as renewable energy
