= Pro-nuclear energy movement =

Advocacy movement for nuclear electricity

Proponents of nuclear energy contend that nuclear power is a safe, sustainable energy source that reduces carbon emissions and increases energy security by decreasing dependence on imported energy sources.

== Context ==
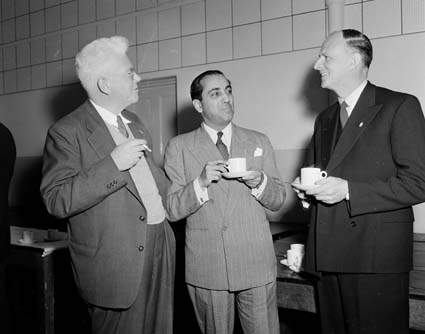
During a two-day symposium on "Atomic Power in Australia" at the New South Wales University of Technology, Sydney, which began on 31 August 1954, Marcus Oliphant (left), Homi Jehangir Bhabha (centre) and Philip Baxter share a cup of tea.

Nuclear energy is often considered to be a controversial area of public policy. The debate about nuclear power peaked during the 1970s and 1980s, when it "reached an intensity unprecedented in the history of technology controversies", in some countries.

Proponents of nuclear energy point to the fact that nuclear power produces very little conventional air pollution, greenhouse gases, and smog, in contrast to fossil fuel sources of energy. Proponents also argue that perceived risks of storing waste are exaggerated, and point to an operational safety record in the Western world which is excellent in comparison to the other major kinds of power plants. Historically, there have been numerous proponents of nuclear energy, including Georges Charpak, Glenn T. Seaborg, Edward Teller, Alvin M. Weinberg, Eugene Wigner, Ted Taylor, and Jeff Eerkens. There are also scientists who write favorably about nuclear energy in terms of the broader energy landscape, including Robert B. Laughlin, Michael McElroy, and Vaclav Smil. In particular, Laughlin writes in "Powering the Future" (2011) that expanded use of nuclear power will be nearly inevitable, either because of a political choice to leave fossil fuels in the ground, or because fossil fuels become depleted.

== Lobbying and public relations activities ==
Globally, there are dozens of companies with an interest in the nuclear industry, including Areva, BHP, Cameco, China National Nuclear Corporation, EDF, Iberdrola, Nuclear Power Corporation of India, Ontario Power Generation, Rosatom, Tokyo Electric Power Company, and Vattenfall. Many of these companies lobby politicians and others about nuclear power expansion, undertake public relation activities, petition government authorities, as well as influence public policy through referendum campaigns and involvement in elections.

The nuclear industry has "tried a variety of strategies to persuade the public to accept nuclear power", including the publication of numerous "fact sheets" that discuss issues of public concern. Nuclear proponents have worked to boost public support by offering newer, safer, reactor designs. These designs include those that incorporate passive safety and Small Modular Reactors.

Since 2000 the nuclear industry has undertaken an international media and lobbying campaign to promote nuclear power as a solution to the greenhouse effect and climate change. Though reactor operation is free of carbon dioxide emissions, other stages of the nuclear fuel chain—from uranium mining, to reactor decommissioning and radioactive waste management—use fossil fuels and hence emit carbon dioxide.

The Nuclear Energy Institute (NEI) has formed various sub-groups to promote nuclear power. These include the Washington-based Clean and Safe Energy Coalition, which was formed in 2006 and led by Patrick Moore. Christine Todd Whitman, former head of the USEPA has also been involved. Clean Energy America is another group also sponsored by the NEI.

In Britain, James Lovelock well known for his Gaia Hypothesis began to support nuclear power in 2004. He is patron of the Supporters of Nuclear Energy. SONE also recognise that there are serious technical challenges associated with an electric grid reliant on intermittent and low-density sources of energy. The main nuclear lobby group in Britain is FORATOM.

As of 2014, the U.S. nuclear industry has begun a new lobbying effort, hiring three former senators—Evan Bayh, a Democrat; Judd Gregg, a Republican; and Spencer Abraham, a Republican—as well as William M. Daley, a former staffer to President Obama. The initiative is called Nuclear Matters, and it has begun a newspaper advertising campaign.

== Organizations supporting nuclear power ==
In March 2017, a bipartisan group of eight senators, including five Republicans and three Democrats introduced S. 512, the Nuclear Energy Innovation and Modernization Act (NEIMA). The legislation would help to modernize the Nuclear Regulatory Commission (NRC), support the advancement of the nation's nuclear industry and develop the regulatory framework to enable the licensing of advanced nuclear reactors, while improving the efficiency of uranium regulation. Letters of support for this legislation were provided by thirty-six organizations, including for-profit enterprises, non-profit organizations and educational institutions. The most prominent entities from that group and other well-known organizations actively supporting the continued or expanded use of nuclear power as a solution for providing clean, reliable energy include:

- The Alvin Weinberg Foundation
- American Nuclear Society (ANS)
- Battelle Memorial Institute
- Breakthrough Institute
- Canadian Nuclear Society
- Canadian Nuclear Association
- Center for Strategic and International Studies
- ClearPath Foundation
- Earth Institute
- Ecomodernists
- Environmentalists for Nuclear
- Environmentalists for Nuclear Energy Australia
- European Atomic Forum
- Generation Atomic
- International Nuclear Societies Council representing thirty-six national nuclear societies from around the world.
- Long Now Foundation
- The Nuclear Energy Institute (NEI is the main lobby group for companies doing nuclear work in the U.S.)
- Nuclear Institute (Formerly the British Nuclear Energy Society (BNES) and the Institution of Nuclear Engineers (INucE), representing nuclear professionals in the U.K.)
- Nuclear New York
- Third Way
- Thorium Energy Alliance is an association studying and advocating for advanced reactor designs.
- The World Nuclear Association, the global trade body for nuclear energy
- WePlanet, is a global environmental organisation with national organisations in 20+ countries. They have actively campaigned for nuclear energy across Europe, Africa, Asia, and Australia. The most high profile campaign as of 2026 is their "Dear Greenpeace" campaign fronted by youth activist Ia Aanstoot.

In 2023, nuclear power plants in the United States generated about 19% of the nation’s electricity. When combined with electricity from renewable sources, nuclear energy accounted for a substantial portion of total carbon-free generation, representing nearly half of all non-fossil electricity produced in the country. Studies have shown that closing a nuclear power plant results in greatly increased carbon emissions as only burning coal or natural gas can make up for the massive amount of energy lost from a nuclear power plant. Even though there have long been protests against nuclear power, the effect of long-term scrutiny has elevated safety within the industry, making nuclear power the safest form of energy in operation today, despite the fact that many continue to fear it. Nuclear power plants create thousands of jobs, many in health and safety jobs, and seldom experience protests from area residents, as they bring large amounts of economic activity, attract educated employees and leave the air clear safe, unlike oil, coal or gas plants, which bring disease and environmental damage to their workers and neighbors. Nuclear engineers have traditionally worked, directly or indirectly, in the nuclear power industry, in academia or for national laboratories. More recently, young nuclear engineers have started to innovate and launch new companies, becoming entrepreneurs in order to bring their enthusiasm for using the power of the atom to address the climate crisis. As of June 2015, Third Way released a report identifying 48 nuclear start-ups or projects organized to work on nuclear innovations in what is being called "advanced nuclear" designs. Current research in the industry is directed at producing economical, proliferation-resistant reactor designs with passive safety features. Although government labs research the same areas as industry, they also study a myriad of other issues such as nuclear fuels and nuclear fuel cycles, advanced reactor designs, and nuclear weapon design and maintenance. A principal pipeline for trained personnel for US reactor facilities is the Navy Nuclear Power Program. The job outlook for nuclear engineering from the year 2012 to the year 2022 is predicted to grow 9% due to many elder nuclear engineers retiring, safety systems needing to be updated in power plants, and the advancements made in nuclear medicine.

== Individuals supporting nuclear power ==
A pragmatic need for secure energy supply is a leading reason for many to support nuclear energy. Many people, including former opponents of nuclear energy, now say that nuclear energy is necessary for reducing carbon dioxide emissions. They recognize that the threat to humanity from climate change is far worse than any risk associated with nuclear energy. Many nuclear energy supporters, but not all, acknowledge that renewable energy is also important to the effort to eliminate emissions. Early environmentalists who publicly voiced support for nuclear power include James Lovelock, originator of the Gaia hypothesis, Patrick Moore, an early member of Greenpeace and former president of Greenpeace Canada, George Monbiot and Stewart Brand, creator of the Whole Earth Catalog. Lovelock goes further to refute claims about the danger of nuclear energy and its waste products. In a January 2008 interview, Moore said that "It wasn't until after I'd left Greenpeace and the climate change issue started coming to the forefront that I started rethinking energy policy in general and realized that I had been incorrect in my analysis of nuclear as being some kind of evil plot." There are increasing numbers of scientists and laymen who are environmentalists with views that depart from the mainstream environmental stance that rejects a role for nuclear power in the climate fight (once labelled "Nuclear Greens," some now consider themselves Ecomodernists).

Other academics and professionals, alarmed by the exaggerated impact media coverage of nuclear accidents have formed a group called Scientists for Accurate Radiation Information (SARI). This was formed after a tsunami in Japan in 2011 caused an accidental release at Fukushima Daiichi, local people were unnecessarily relocated and psychologically stressed by false fears. This evacuation is estimated to have produced increased mortality rates equivalent to 2,313 deaths. This effective suffering is known as the 'nocebo' effect and describes a situation where a negative outcome occurs due to a belief that an intervention will cause harm.

Others who have spoken publicly on the benefits of nuclear power include:

=== Scientists ===
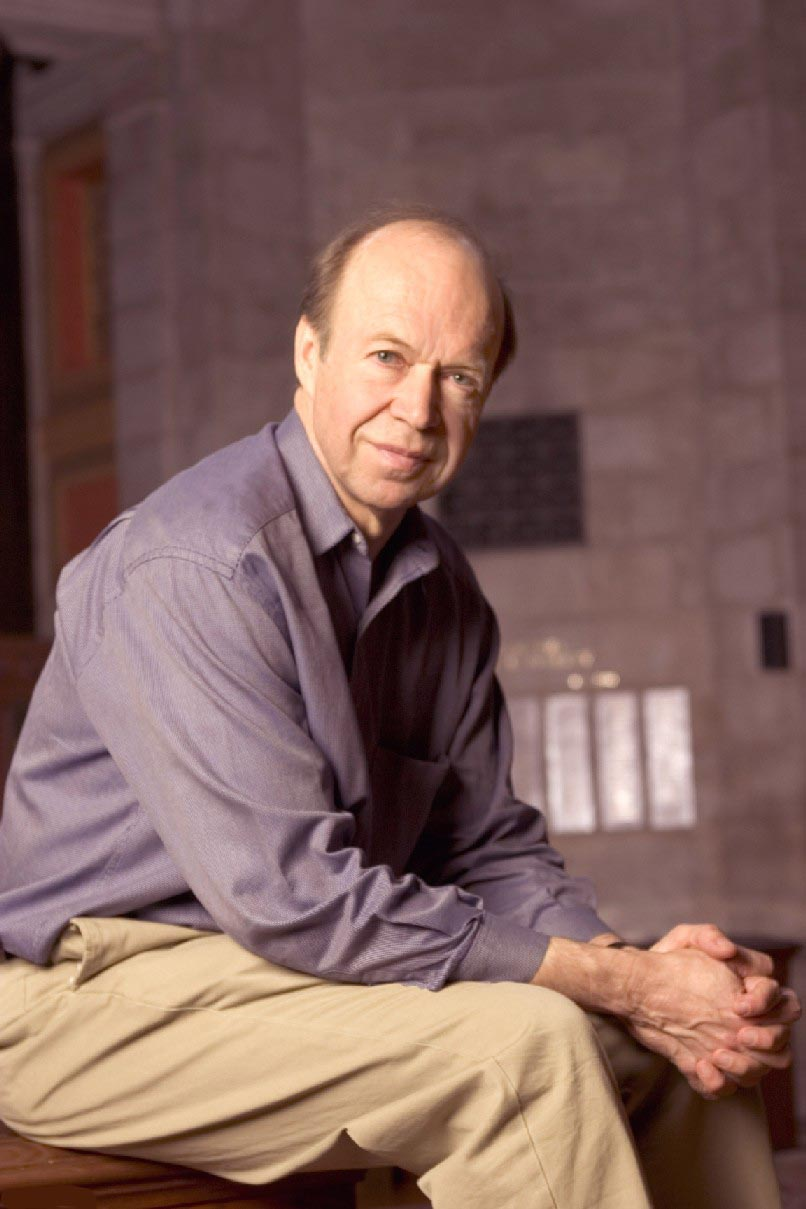
James Edward Hansen

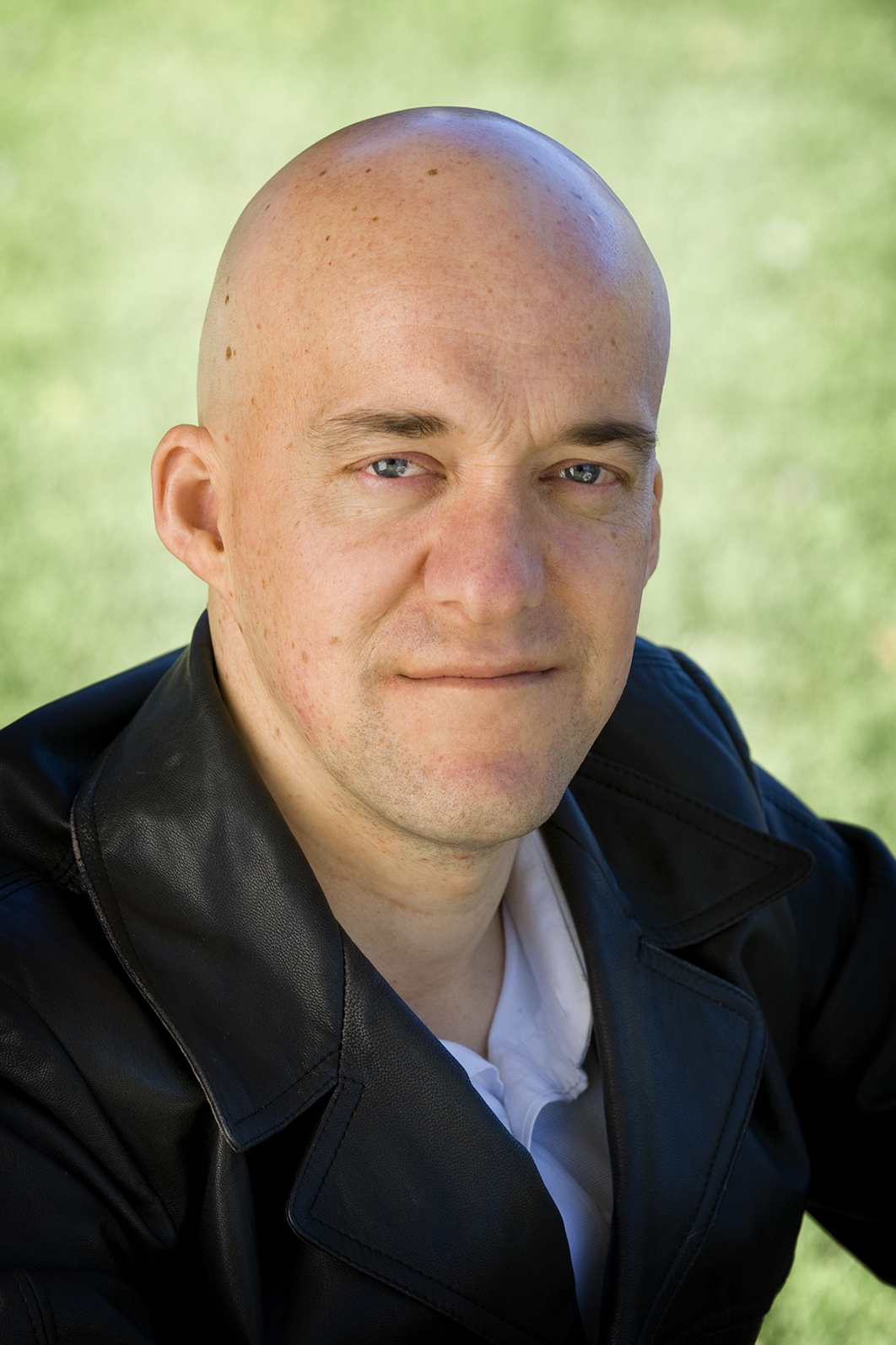
Prof. Barry W. Brook

- Hans Blix, Director General Emeritus of the IAEA
- Ben Britton, deputy director of the Centre for Nuclear Engineering, Imperial College London
- Ken Caldeira, Stanford University
- Georges Charpak, Polish-born French physicist
- Stephen Chu, former U.S. Secretary of Energy, former Chairman of the Federal Energy Regulatory Commission
- Kerry Emanuel, Professor of Atmospheric Science, Massachusetts Institute of Technology
- Ian Fells
- Martin Freer, Head of Physics and Astronomy, University of Birmingham, Director of the Birmingham Energy Institute (BEI)
- Richard Garwin, American physicist
- James Hansen Director of Climate Science, Awareness, and Solutions Program and the Earth Institute, Columbia University
- David Keith
- James Lovelock
- Jessica Lovering, co-founder of the Good Energy Collective and senior fellow at the Nuclear Innovation Alliance.
- David J. C. MacKay (also an author and former DECC chief scientific advisor; died 2016)
- Michael McElroy
- Richard Muller, Professor of Physics, UC Berkeley, co-founder, Berkeley Earth
- Ernest Moniz, former U.S. Secretary of Energy
- Peter H. Raven, President Emeritus, Missouri Botanical Garden. Winner of the National Medal of Science, 2001
- Carlo Rubbia, Nobel Laureate in Physics
- Grace Stanke, American pageant titleholder who was crowned Miss America 2023 and nuclear engineer and national advocate for nuclear power
- Tom Wigley, Climate scientist at the University of Adelaide

=== Non-scientists ===
- Ansel Adams (Photographer, former Sierra Club director; died 1984)
- John Barrasso (U.S. Senator (R) from Wyoming)
- Michael Bloomberg (Former Mayor of New York City, co-author with Carl Pope of "Climate of Hope")
- Isabelle Boemeke, Brazilian fashion model supported by Patreon contributions and her earnings as a model and influencer, pro-nuclear electricity advocate
- Cory Booker (U.S. Senator (D) from New Jersey)
- Stewart Brand (Writer, speaker, founder of the Whole Earth Catalog)
- Carol Browner (Former EPA administrator and ECCP (White House Office of Energy and Climate Change Policy) director in the Obama administration, author of "Comments on Proposed Radiation Protection Standards for Yucca Mountain, Nevada," Leadership Council, Nuclear Matters)
- Robert Bryce (Writer)
- Shelley Moore Capito (U.S. Senator (R) from West Virginia)
- Jimmy Carter (Former President of the United States, peace ambassador)
- Mike Crapo (U.S. Senator (R) from Idaho)
- Gwyneth Cravens (Journalist, author of "Power to Save the World")
- Leslie Dewan (Nuclear engineer and entrepreneur)
- Martin Ferguson
- Deb Fischer (U.S. Senator (R) from Nebraska)
- Bill Gates (Founder of Microsoft Corporation, philanthropist, investor)
- Chris Goodall (Author)
- Steven F. Hayward (Senior Resident Scholar, Institute of Governmental Studies University of California, Berkeley)
- Ben Heard (executive director, Bright New World)
- Paul Howes
- Vincent Ialenti (Cultural anthropologist)
- Jim Inhofe (U.S. Senator (R) from Oklahoma)
- John G. Kemeny
- John Kerry (former U.S. Secretary of State, U.S. Senator (D) from Massachusetts)
- Ro Khanna (U.S. Representative (D) from CA-17)
- Steve Kirsch (Silicon Valley entrepreneur, CEO Token)
- Bob Latta (U.S. Representative (R) for Ohio's fifth congressional district)
- John Lavine (Medill Dean Emeritus Northwestern University)
- Zion Lights (Author, activist, founder of Nuclear For Net Zero)
- Bjørn Lomborg (Researcher, author)
- Mark Lynas (Journalist, activist, author The God Species, Six Degrees)
- Tyrone D'Lisle (Environmentalist)
- Joe Manchin (U.S. Senator (D) from West Virginia)
- Haydon Manning
- John McCain 2008 United States presidential debates
- Steve McCormick (Former CEO, The Nature Conservancy)
- Jerry McNerney (U.S. Representative (D) for California's 9th congressional district)
- Narendra Modi, Prime Minister of India
- George Monbiot (Journalist)
- Hugh Montefiore (Priest, former Friends of the Earth trustee; died 2005)
- Patrick Moore (co-founder of Greenpeace, and former president of Greenpeace Canada)
- Lauri Muranen (executive director, World Energy Council Finland)
- Lisa Murkowski (U.S. Senator (R) for Alaska)
- Ted Nordhaus (Author, chairman of the Breakthrough Institute)
- Fred Pearce (Journalist, author)
- Steven Pinker (Harvard University, author of The Better Angels of Our Nature)
- Richard Rhodes (Pulitzer Prize winning journalist, author of "Nuclear Renewal" and The Making of the Atomic Bomb)
- Jeffrey Sachs (Economist, director of The Earth Institute)
- Peter Schwartz (Author of "Art of the Long View")
- Michael Shellenberger (Author, co-founder of the Breakthrough Institute, President of Environmental Progress)
- Robert Stone (Director; his film Pandora's Promise features pro-nuclear environmentalists)
- Nobuo Tanaka (Chairman, Sasakawa Peace Foundation, former executive director, International Energy Agency)
- Frank Thelen (Businessman, investor)
- Stephen Tindale (Chief Executive of the Alvin Weinberg Foundation and former executive director Greenpeace UK)
- Sheldon Whitehouse (U.S. Senator (D) from Rhode Island)
- Bryony Worthington (Environmental campaigner, UK House of Lords member)
- Tim Yeo (Chair, New Nuclear Watch Europe, former chair Energy and Climate Change Parliamentary Select Committee)
- Jiang Zemin (Former General Secretary of the Chinese Communist Party)
- Xi Jinping (Current General Secretary of the Chinese Communist Party)
- Elon Musk (Billionaire entrepreneur)

Open letter signatories

Climate and energy scientists in 2013: there is no credible path to climate stabilization that does not include a substantial role for nuclear power

Conservation biologists in 2014: to replace the burning of fossil fuels, if we are to have any chance of mitigating severe climate change [...we] need to accept a substantial role for advanced nuclear power systems with complete fuel recycling

The following is a list of people that signed the open letter:

- Ken Caldeira
- Kerry Emanuel
- James Hansen
- Tom Wigley
- Barry Brook (co-author)
- Corey J. A. Bradshaw (co-author)
- Andrew Balmford
- Daniel T. Blumstein
- Scott Carroll
- F. Stuart Chapin III
- Richard Hobbs
- Ove Hoegh-Guldberg
- William F. Laurance
- Thomas Lovejoy
- Robert May (also a UK House of Lords member)
- Hugh Possingham
- Peter H. Raven
- Richard Shine
- Chris D. Thomas

== Future prospects ==
The International Thermonuclear Experimental Reactor, located in France, is the world's largest and most advanced experimental tokamak nuclear fusion reactor project. A collaboration between the European Union (EU), India, Japan, China, Russia, South Korea and the United States, the project aims to make a transition from experimental studies of plasma physics to electricity-producing fusion power plants. However, the World Nuclear Association says that nuclear fusion "presents so far insurmountable scientific and engineering challenges". Construction of the ITER facility began in 2007, but the project has run into many delays and budget overruns. The facility is now not expected to begin operations until the year 2027—11 years after initially anticipated.

Another nuclear power program is the Energy Impact Center's OPEN100 project. OPEN100 was launched in 2020 and has published open-source blueprints for a nuclear power plant with a 100-megawatt pressurized water reactor. The project aims to minimize the costs and duration of construction to increase nuclear power supply and potentially reverse the effects of climate change.

== See also ==
- Atoms for Peace
- Bright green environmentalism (a.k.a. Ecomodernism)
- Ecomodernist movement; environmentalist ideology supportive of nuclear power
- Energy development
- Environmental impact of nuclear power
- Generation IV reactor (future design concepts)
- High-voltage direct current
- List of anti-nuclear advocates in the United States
- Next Generation Nuclear Plant
- Nuclear power debate
- Nuclear power proposed as renewable energy
- Nuclear renaissance
- Small modular reactor
- Super grid
- United States energy independence
- World Association of Nuclear Operators
- World Nuclear Association
- 2023 United Nations Climate Change Conference
