= Ronald J. Konopka =

American geneticist (1947–2015)

Ronald J. Konopka (1947–2015) was an American geneticist who studied chronobiology. He made his most notable contribution to the field while working with Drosophila in the lab of Seymour Benzer at the California Institute of Technology. During this work, Konopka discovered the period (per) gene, which controls the period of circadian rhythms.

== Academic career ==
Ron Konopka received his Ph.D. in biology from the California Institute of Technology in 1972. In 1975, following his discovery of the period mutants, Konopka was awarded a faculty position at the California Institute of Technology. While there, Konopka's colleagues were critical of his reluctance to publish his work on the period gene, and Konopka was denied tenure. After his stay at Caltech, Konopka accepted a position at Clarkson University but was again denied tenure and subsequently exited the field of science. Konopka's career, interwoven with the work of his mentor, Seymour Benzer, and the other scientists working in Benzer's lab is narrated in Time, Love, Memory by Jonathan Weiner.

Konopka's discovery and genetic analysis of period and several other circadian rhythm mutations became the basis of the research done by Drs. Jeffrey C. Hall, Michael Rosbash, and Michael W. Young, who were awarded the 2017 Nobel Prize in Physiology or Medicine.

== Research ==
=== Period mutants ===
==== Discovery of Period ====
As a graduate student in Seymour Benzer's lab, Konopka sought to use Benzer's method of behavioral genetics to unravel the mysteries of the "master clock" that existed in every organism. He used ethyl methanesulfonate (EMS) to induce point mutations in the Drosophila melanogaster genome, and eventually isolated three mutants with abnormal rhythms in eclosion. He mapped the mutations to the same location on the far left of the X chromosome, less than 1 centimorgan away from the white gene locus. These mutations were alternative alleles of a gene that Konopka subsequently named period. While wild type flies have a circadian period around 24 hours, Konopka found the per^{01} mutant was arrhythmic, the per^{S} mutant had a period of 19 hours, and the per^{L} had a period of 29 hours.

==== Neurobiology of per mutants ====
In 1979 and a 1980, Konopka and Dominic Orr tested whether mutations in per mutations affected the period of the entire circadian cycle or just a portion of it. By comparing the light responses of per^{S} eclosion rhythm to that of wild type flies, Konopka and Orr found that light pulses reset the mutant clock to a greater extent than the wild type clock (about 10 hours for per^{S} compared to 3 hours for wild type flies). They also observed that the while duration of the light-sensitive part of the day (subjective night) was found to be similar between per^{S} and wild type flies, the duration of the light-insensitive part of the cycle (subjective day) was 5 hours shorter in mutant flies than in wild type flies. They concluded that differences in period length between mutant and wild type flies could be accounted for by a shortening of the subjective day, or the active part of the circadian cycle, in per^{S} mutants. From this, Konopka concluded that separate molecular processes correspond to the subjective night and subjective day and that the per^{S} allele acts by shortening the subjective day while leaving the subjective night unchanged. Based on these findings, Konopka and Orr constructed a model for the action of the per gene. The oscillation is interpreted in terms of a membrane gradient that is established during the subjective day and dissipates during the subjective night. The model predicts that the per gene product is active during the subjective day and functions like a pump to establish the gradient. Once a high threshold is reached, the pump shuts off and light-sensitive channels open to dissipate the gradient. A light pulse during the subjective night closes the channels and starts the pump; the value of the gradient when the channels close is the same as the value when the pump starts, and thus a reset in the cycle is produced and an oscillation results. This model has been replaced with a transcription translation negative feedback model involving timeless, clock, and cycle.

Also in 1980, Konopka and Steven Wells reported an abnormality in the morphology of a neurosecretory cell group associated with the arrhythmic per^{01} mutation and with 2 arrhythmic mutants of another fly strain, Drosophila pseudoobscura. This cell group normally consists of four clustered cells in either side of the brain, roughly halfway between the top and bottom edge, in the posterior area of the brain. Cells in this cluster are occasionally located abnormally near the top edge, rather than the middle, of the brain at a rate of about 17% of cells in wild-type D. melanogaster. The per^{01} mutation significantly increases the percentage of abnormally located cells to about 40%. In two aperiodic strains of D. pseudoobscura, the percentages of abnormally located cells are likewise significantly increased over those in the wild type. Konopka inferred from the results that neurosecretory cells may be part of the Drosophila circadian system and that per gene product may influence the development of these cells.

==== Pacemaker signalling ====
fIn 1979 Konopka worked with Alfred Handler to discover the nature behind pacemaker signalling by transplanting brains of donor flies into abdomens of arrhythmic host flies. They found that circadian rhythms in host flies were restored with the period of the donor; for example, short period (per^{S}) adult brains implanted into the abdomens of arrhythmic (per^{01}) hosts could confer a short period rhythm on the activity of some hosts for at least 4 cycles. Since the transplanted brains were unable to create new neuronal connections to locomotor activity centers, Konopka and Handler concluded that pacemaker signalling for locomotion must be humoral and not neuronal.

==== Reciprocal behavior of per mutants ====
While at Clarkson College, Konopka continued his work with Orr and also collaborated with chronobiologist Colin Pittendrigh. During the collaboration, Konopka worked to understand behaviors of Drosophila per mutants beyond their abnormal period lengths. Konopka was primarily interested in how these mutants behaved in constant light or constant darkness and whether they conformed to the rules established by chronobiologist Jurgen Aschoff. In addition, Konopka also observed behavior of the flies under varying light intensities and over a range of temperatures. Konopka found that the per^{S} and per^{L} flies showed reciprocal behaviors under the experimental conditions. For example, per^{S} period shortened, while per^{L} period lengthened in response to decreasing temperature. Konopka hypothesized that these reciprocal behaviors were a manifestation of two coupled oscillators, a model proposed in 1976 by Pittendrigh and Daan.

=== Other circadian mutants ===
==== Clock mutants ====
In 1990, Konopka collaborated with Mitchell S. Dushay and Jeffery C. Hall to further investigate the effects of the clock gene in D. melanogaster. Konopka had noted in 1987 that the Clock (Clk) mutant, induced via chemical mutation, was a semidominant mutation that shortened the rhythm of locomotor activity in flies by around 1.5hr. Dushay, Konopka and Hall noted that Clk mutants had phase response curve that was shortened from 24hr to 22.5hr, and that the short period was also observable in the eclosion rhythm of the mutant flies. Clk was mapped close enough to the per^{01} mutation such that it could be considered a per allele, but due to the presence normal courtship song rhythms in Clk males and the lack of coverage of its effects via duplications, Dushay and Konopka determined that Clock was a novel circadian mutation.

==== Andante mutants ====
By working with Randall F. Smith and Dominic Orr of Caltech, Konopka discovered a new circadian mutant, named Andante, in 1990. In contrast to Clock, Andante lengthens the period of eclosion, and locomotor activity by 1.5–2 hours, and was also shown to lengthen the periods of other circadian mutants. Andante is a semi-dominant mutation, temperature compensated, and unaffected by the sine oculis mutation, which eliminates the outer visual system of flies. It was mapped to the 10E1-2 to 10F1 region of the D. melanogaster X chromosome, close to the miniature-dusky locus.
