= List of anti-nuclear advocates in the United States =

Notable individuals who have expressed reservations about nuclear power, nuclear weapons, and/or uranium mining in the US include the following.

- Steve Allen
- Edward Asner
- Alex Baldwin
- Thomas Banyacya
- Albert Bates
- Norma Becker
- Shelley Berkley
- Daniel Berrigan
- Philip Berrigan
- Rosalie Bertell
- Bill Bichsel
- Larry Bogart
- Peter A. Bradford
- Michael F. Brennan
- Dale Bridenbaugh
- Pierce Brosnan
- David Brower
- Jackson Browne
- Helen Caldicott
- Paxus Calta
- Glenn Carroll
- Paul K. Chappell
- Guy Chichester
- Tom Clements
- William Sloane Coffin
- Barry Commoner
- Norman Cousins
- Lisa Crawford
- Frances Crowe
- Matt Damon
- Carrie Barefoot Dickerson
- Ralph DiGia
- Paul M. Doty
- Michael Douglas
- Eric Epstein
- Samuel Epstein
- Jane Fonda
- Randall Forsberg
- Morgan Freeman
- S. David Freeman
- Carole Gallagher
- Noel Gayler
- Carol Gilbert
- John Glenn
- John Gofman
- Whoopi Goldberg
- Jay M. Gould
- Karl Grossman
- Ed Grothus
- Arnold Gundersen
- Paul Gunter
- John Hall
- Corbin Harney
- Howie Hawkins
- Richard Hubbard
- Jackie Hudson
- Robert Hunter (journalist)
- John Isaacs
- Mark Z. Jacobson
- Ben Jealous
- Carl J. Johnson
- Judy Johnsrud
- Henry Kissinger
- David Krieger
- Hans M. Kristensen
- Dennis Kucinich
- Eve Andree Laramee
- Mary Dennis Lentch
- Sally Lilienthal
- Sam Lovejoy
- Rachel MacNair
- Joanna Macy
- Arjun Makhijani
- Thomas Mancuso
- Lenore Marshall
- Norman Mayer
- Gary Milhollin
- Gregory Minor
- Roger Molander
- Karl Z. Morgan
- Howard Morland
- Macy Morse
- Hermann Joseph Muller
- Ralph Nader
- Graham Nash
- Holly Near
- Robert De Niro
- Sam Nunn
- Park Overall
- Grace Paley
- William Perry
- John Aristotle Phillips
- Concepcion Picciotto
- Esther Posneck
- Eugene Rabinowitch
- Phil Radford
- Bonnie Raitt
- M.V. Ramana
- Donna Reed
- Megan Rice
- Jose Rodriguez (activist)
- Joseph J. Romm
- Robert Ryan
- Susan Sarandon
- Jonathan Schell
- George Shultz
- Martin Sheen
- Peter Shumlin
- Karen Silkwood
- Mary P. Sinclair
- Pam Solo
- Norman Solomon
- Richard Springer
- Ernest Sternglass
- Gene Stone
- Joanne Sweeney
- Arthur R. Tamplin
- Thomas
- Ellen Thomas
- Bonnie Urfer
- Louie Vitale
- Christoph Waltz
- Harvey Wasserman
- Floyd Red Crow Westerman
- Ann Wright
- Scott Yundt
- Ian Zabarte

== See also ==
- Anti-nuclear protests in the United States
- Anti-nuclear groups in the United States
- List of peace activists
- List of anti-nuclear advocates in Germany
- List of pro-nuclear (power) environmentalists
