= Weinberg Foundation =

Weinberg Foundation may refer to:

- Harry and Jeanette Weinberg Foundation
- The Alvin Weinberg Foundation
