= The Beak of the Finch =

1994 nonfiction book by Jonathan Weiner

- Author: Jonathan Weiner
- Publication date: 1995

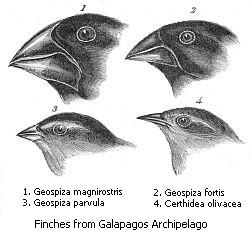
Darwin's finches

The Beak of the Finch: A Story of Evolution in Our Time (ISBN 0-679-40003-6) is a 1994 nonfiction book about evolutionary biology, written by Jonathan Weiner. It won the 1995 Pulitzer Prize for General Nonfiction. In 2014, a substantially unchanged 20th-anniversary edition e-book was issued with a preface by the author.

== Content ==
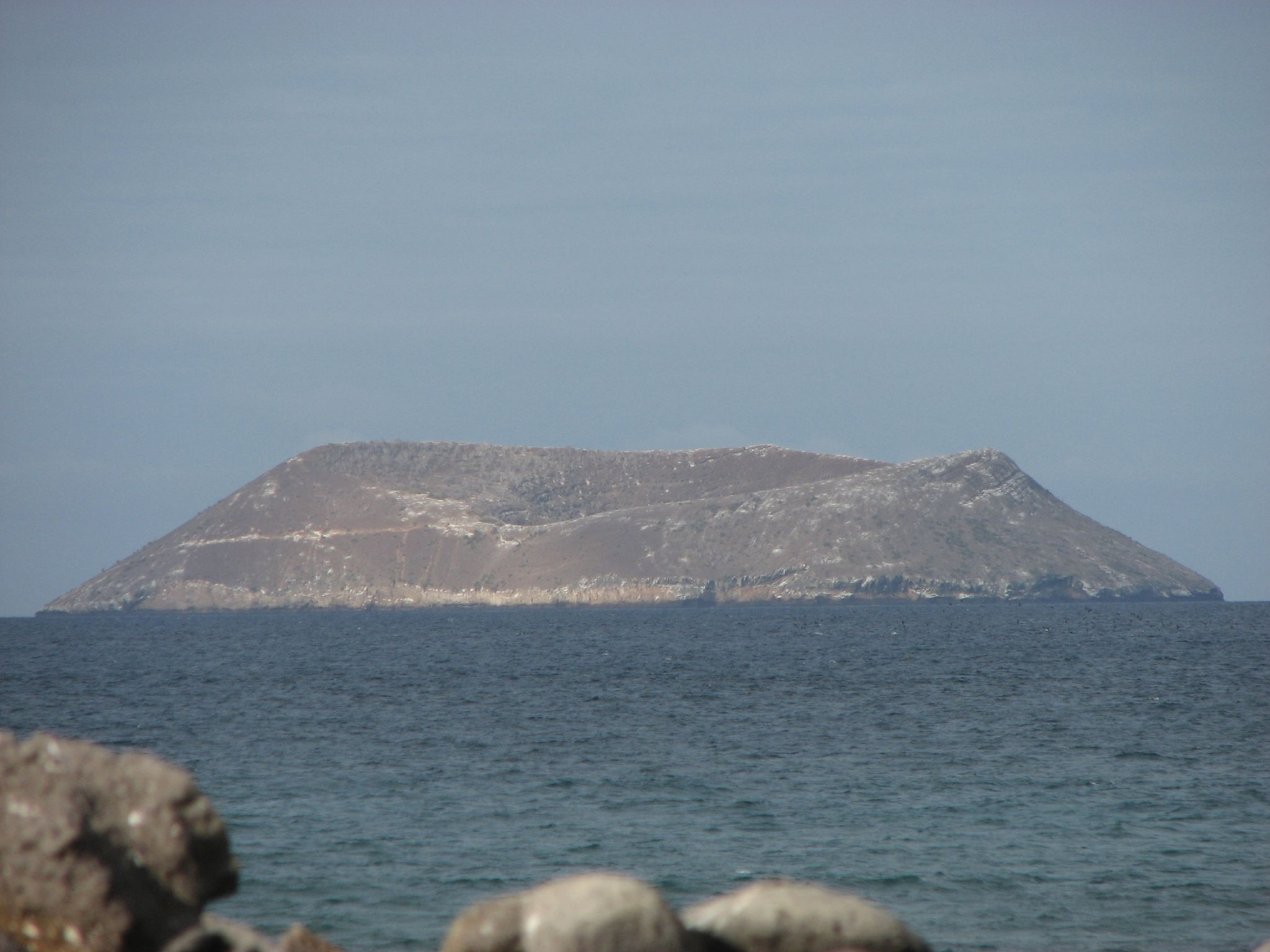
The island Daphne Major where most of the research described in Beak of the Finch takes place

The finches of the title are Darwin's Finches,' passerine songbirds in the Galápagos Islands. The species are so distinct that when Charles Darwin collected them during the voyage of the Beagle he thought they were completely different birds, and it was only when he was back in London in 1837 that the ornithologist John Gould revealed that they were closely allied, reinforcing Darwin's growing view that “species are not immutable.” The adaptations of their numerous species, in three genera, show diverging evolution to exploit several ecological niches in the rugged and dry Galápagos Islands.

Weiner follows the careers of two biologists, Peter and Rosemary Grant, and several of their graduate students, including Dolph Schluter, Trevor Price, James (Jamie) Smith, and Peter Boag. The Grants spent more than thirty years (twenty of which are covered in the book) studying the morphology (especially bill shape), reproduction, survival, and behaviour of entire populations of Galapagos finches. Their work revolutionized scientists understanding of the pace of evolution, proving that evolution can be observed in 'real time'. Weiner describes years of painstaking field work on a desert island among the Galapagos, Daphne Major. Following years of intense drought or flooding, the Grants and their students were able to demonstrate all the necessary requirements for natural selection: traits have fitness consequences, respond to selection, and are heritable.

The Grants observed evolution in action. During the drought of 1977, the fortis finches evolved longer beaks: "Among fortis, they already knew that the biggest birds with the biggest beaks had the best equipment for big tough seeds like Tribulus; and when the totted up the statistics, they saw that during the drought, when big tough seeds were all a bird could find, these big-bodied, big-beaked birds had come through and bred the best. The surviving fortis were an average of 5 to 6 percent larger than the dead. The average fortis beak before the drought was 10.68 millimeters long and 9.42 deep. The average beak of the fortis that survived the drought was 11.07 millimeters long and 9.96 deep."

While the book focuses on the Grant's and Darwin's finches, it also covers work on fruit flies by Dobzhansky (Chaper 12), Trinidadian guppies led by John Endler (Chapter 6) and the soapberry bug by Scott Caroll' (Chapter 16).

Weiner describes examples of evolution in action: antimicrobial resistance and pesticide resistance. He speculates about the influence of climate change on evolution. He concludes that our unique consciousness has given us the power to shape evolution, and also made us the only animal to figure out how it came to be.

== Reception ==
Kim Sterelny (2007) cites this rapid natural selection as illustrating an important point about periods of relative stasis in the punctuated equilibrium hypothesis of Niles Eldredge and Stephen Jay Gould: "In claiming that species typically undergo no further evolutionary change once speciation is complete, they are not claiming that there is no change at all between one generation and the next. Lineages do change. But the change between generations does not accumulate. Instead, over time, the species wobbles about its phenotypic mean. Jonathan Weiner's The Beak of the Finch describes this very process".

The book is well received by biologists, and has been praised for its description of the ups and downs of fieldwork, the excitement of unexpected results, and the growing emphasis on critical statistical analysis to uncover patterns. It received some criticism for over-emphasizing the research by the Grants, e.g. Weiner's claim that they discovered species pairs of sticklebacks in freshwater lakes that were already well-known. But reviews agree that the book is compelling, well written, and an excellent primer on how evolution works. Per a 1995 review, "In The Beak of the Finch, Jonathan Weiner vividly describes the excitement of modern evolutionary biology through the eyes and activities of two of its most important students, Peter and Rosemary Grant."
