= Muton (genetics) =

Smallest unit in a chromosome that can be changed by mutations

Muton is a term in genetics that means the smallest unit in a chromosome that can be changed by mutations.

The term Muton was created by Seymour Benzer in 1955 after his work about the mapping of bacteriophages T4.
