= Dolph Schluter =

Canadian professor

- Born: May 22, 1955 (age 71); Dorval, Quebec
- Citizenship: Canadian
- Education: University of Guelph; University of Michigan
- Awards: Darwin–Wallace Medal (2014); Darwin Medal (2021); Crafoord Prize (2023)
- Scientific career
- Workplaces: University of British Columbia
- Thesis: Diets, distributions and morphology of galapagos ground finches: the importance of food supply and interspecific competition. (1983)
- Doctoral advisor: Peter Grant

Dolph Schluter FRS FRSC OBC (born May 22, 1955) is a Canadian professor of Evolutionary Biology and a University Killam Professor in the Department of Zoology at the University of British Columbia. Schluter is a major researcher in adaptive radiation and currently studies speciation in the three-spined stickleback, Gasterosteus aculeatus.

Schluter received his Bachelor of Science in Biology from the University of Guelph in 1977, and his Doctor of Philosophy in Zoology from the University of Michigan in 1983, in Ecology and Evolution.

== Research ==
Schluter's early research was done on the evolutionary ecology and morphology of Darwin's finches, and was featured in the popular science book the The Beak of the Finch by Jonathan Weiner. Schluter is the author of The Ecology of Adaptive Radiation, 2000, Oxford University Press, and The Analysis of Biological Data, 2009 (and 2015, 2020), with Michael Whitlock, and an editor with Robert E. Ricklefs of Species Diversity in Ecological Communities: Historical and Geographical Perspectives, 1993, University of Chicago Press.

His 2023 Crafoord Prize citation stated "This year’s Crafoord Laureate in biosciences has demonstrated that Darwin’s theories about natural selection are true in practice. Using revolutionary studies of finches and sticklebacks, Dolph Schluter, University of British Columbia, Canada, has provided us with knowledge of how species arise.

== Awards and honours ==
In 1999, he was elected as a fellow of the Royal Society of London. In 2001, he was elected as a fellow of the Royal Society of Canada. The American Society of Naturalists awarded him the Sewall Wright Award in 2007. In 2012, he was made International Honorary Member of the American Academy of Arts and Sciences. He received the Darwin-Wallace Medal from The Linnean Society of London in 2014, and in 2017, he was elected as a Foreign Fellow of the US National Academy of Sciences. Schluter was made a Member of the Order of British Columbia in 2021. In 2024 he was elected Member of the American Philosophical Society. In 2023, Schluter was awarded the Crafoord Prize for "revolutionary studies of finches and sticklebacks [which have] provided us with knowledge of how species arise". Schluter donated funds from the award, with funds from other sources including Sarah Otto, to endow a postdoctoral fellowship in biodiversity studies at UBC.
