= Canadian Nuclear Society =

Canadian not-for-profit organization

Logo since 2022

The Canadian Nuclear Society (CNS) is a not-for-profit organization representing individuals contributing to, or otherwise supporting, nuclear science and engineering in Canada. Since 2017, the group has invested in the development of small modular reactor technology.

The CNS is a member of the International Nuclear Societies Council (INSC).

== History and mandate ==
The Canadian Nuclear Society was established in 1979 as "the technical society of the Canadian Nuclear Association (CNA)". Although legally a division of the CNA, the CNS operated independently from the start, with its own volunteer Council (Board of Directors), its own mandate, its own activities, and its own budget. In 1998 the CNS incorporated independently as a federal, not-for-profit corporation, following an overwhelming vote from members. Since then the legal name of the CNS is "Canadian Nuclear Society/Société Nucléaire Canadienne, Inc.".

The CNS is dedicated to the exchange of information, both within the nuclear professional and academic community, and with the public, in the field of applied nuclear science and technology. This encompasses all aspects of nuclear energy, uranium, fission and other nuclear technologies such as occupational and environmental protection, medical diagnosis and treatment, the use of radioisotopes, and food preservation.

== Governance ==
The CNS is governed by a council, acting as its board of directors, consisting of an executive committee and nine - sixteen members-at-large. The 2017–2018 executive committee consists of: Daniel Gammage (president), Peter Ozemoyah (past president), John Luxat (1st vice-president and president-elect), Keith Stratton (2nd vice-president), Mohamed Younis (treasurer), Colin Hunt (secretary), Ken Smith (financial administrator), Ben Rouben (executive director), Peter Easton (communications director), and John Roberts (chair of the Education and Communications Committee).

== Membership ==
The CNS membership includes about 1200 individuals, mostly from within Canada.

The primary category of CNS membership is that of an individual directly involved in the use or development of a nuclear technology in any of the above areas or an individual who is simply interested in nuclear technology.

Another category of CNS membership is that of an educational institution, such as school or university, or public library, that has an interest in providing timely information on nuclear science and technology to a student body or to the public at large. This type of membership has all the privileges of an individual membership with the exception of voting rights.

== Operational structure and activities ==
The CNS is structured along five main technical Divisions (Design & Materials, Fuel Technologies, Nuclear Operations & Maintenance, Nuclear Science & Engineering, and Environment & Waste Management), whose main activities are to organize and conduct workshops, courses, symposia, or conferences within their respective technical areas.

General administration and outreach (public, other societies, etc.) are typically carried out by a number of Committees within the CNS.

The CNS holds an annual conference each June, which includes technical sessions covering all fields, as well as plenary sessions that address topics of broad interest.

At the local level across the country, the CNS includes fourteen branches (nine in Ontario, one in each of Alberta, Saskatchewan, Manitoba, Quebec, and New Brunswick)

== Affiliations ==
The CNS is affiliated with several "sister" nuclear societies around the world, and is also an organizational member of the Engineering Institute of Canada (EIC). The president of the CNS is an ex officio voting member of the board of directors of the Canadian Nuclear Association.
