= Sharyn Clough =

American philosopher

Sharyn Clough (born 14 May 1965) is professor of philosophy at Oregon State University.

Her teaching and research specialties focus on public philosophy, Peace Literacy, philosophy of science, social epistemology, contemporary pragmatism, and feminist theory.

Clough is the Director of the Phronesis Lab at OSU where she and her students design and assess curriculum to teach Peace Literacy as phronesis or practical wisdom. Clough is also the Peace Literacy Curriculum Coordinator working with a team of educators from pre-K to higher education, who design and test Peace Literacy curriculum in their classrooms around the US and Canada.

== Background and research ==
Clough studied at the University of Calgary, where she received her BA Hons in Social Psychology in 1987 and her MA in Social Scientific Study of Religion in 1989. She earned her PhD from Simon Fraser University in History and Philosophy of Science and Women's Studies in 1997. Before coming to Oregon State University in 2003, she taught at Hamilton College, Le Moyne College, Rowan University, and the University of Tennessee.

Her work examines the complex ways in which science and politics are interwoven, and the notions of objectivity that can be salvaged once this complexity is acknowledged. Her research on the potential relationship between gender socialization and gender differences in allergies, asthma and other autoimmune disorders illustrated the ways that politically engaged research can at times increase objectivity, a project that received international attention. More recently her work in public philosophy investigates the importance of basic peace skills or Peace Literacy for deliberation about controversial science policies, such as publicly mandated vaccines, and deliberations across conflicts more generally.

== Public engagement ==
Clough has been interviewed about the relationship between science and politics in an episode of the syndicated public radio show Philosophy Talk. She was also interviewed online at Engaged Philosophy, about her work in public philosophy through Phronesis Lab. Her work has also been featured in public-facing features on science and politics as well as public philosophy. Since 2017, Clough has facilitated public workshops on Peace Literacy across the US and Canada, for students of all ages but primarily as professional development for educators, working closely with the founder of Peace Literacy, Paul K. Chappell.

== Selected essay publications ==
- Behavior support informed by Peace Literacy. Montessori Public (National Center for Montessori in the Public Sector) lead author, with Paul K. Chappell, Jacqui Miller, and Natalie Celeste, 2021, vol 5 (3): 1–4.
- Peace Literacy, Cognitive Bias, and Structural Injustice. In Transformative Approaches to Social Justice Education: Equity and Access in the College Classroom. Co-edited by N. Osei-Kofi, B. Boovy, and K. Furman, 2021, pp. 105–123: ISBN 978-0-367-55103-2
- Using Values as Evidence When There’s Evidence for Your Values: A Pragmatist Approach, Philosophy in the Contemporary World, 2020, vol. 26, (1/2) pp. 5–37. doi:10.5840/pcw2020261/21
- Where are all of the Pragmatist Feminist Philosophers of Science? lead author, with Nancy McHugh. In The Routledge Handbook of Feminist Philosophy of Science, eds. S. Crasnow and K. Intemann, 2020, pp. 170–184. doi:10.4324/9780429507731-16
- Charity, Peace, and the Social Epistemology of Science Controversies. In Social Epistemology and Relativism, co-edited by N. Ashton, M. Kusch, R. McKenna, and K. Sodoma, 2020, pp. 122–42. doi:10.4324/9780429199356-10

== Published books ==
- Beyond Epistemology: A Pragmatist Approach to Feminist Science Studies (2003, ISBN 0-7425-1464-1)
- Siblings Under the Skin: Feminism, Social Justice and Analytic Philosophy (2003, ISBN 1-888570-69-5) (editor)

== Sources ==
- Anglo-American Name Authority File, s.v. "Clough, Sharyn", LC Control Number n 2002110809. Accessed 2021-09-11.
