= Time, Love, Memory =

Book published in 1999

- First US hardcover edition (1999)
- Author: Jonathan Weiner
- Language: English
- Subject: Seymour Benzer
- Published: 1999
- Publisher: Alfred A. Knopf; Penguin Random House
- Publication place: United States
- ISBN: 9780679763901 Penguin Random House edition

Time, Love, Memory: A Great Biologist and His Quest for the Origins of Behavior is a book by American non-fiction writer Jonathan Weiner, published in 1999. The book is a biography of California Institute of Technology biologist Seymour Benzer, who is recognized as one of the pioneers of genetics and molecular biology.

The book received mostly positive reviews, with critics noting its scientific accuracy and that it is about a "fascinating history". Reviews by the biologists, noted that Weiner "never really attempts a critical evaluation of what fruitflies have contributed to our understanding of behavior", and criticized the portrayal of Max Delbrück in the book; however, all the critics were very positive in their reviews.

== Synopsis ==
Benzer started his career at Purdue University as a graduate student in solid state physics, studying semiconductors. His work in the early 1940s contributed to the subsequent development of the transistor. In 1946, he read Erwin Schrodinger's highly influential book What Is Life?, which described the nature of genes as known in the 1940s as "the great unsolved mystery of biology". Inspired by the book, Benzer enrolled in the summer course organized by Max Delbrück at Cold Spring Harbor Laboratory. After the course Benzer decided to change his career and became a biologist. For the next several years he worked with Delbrück and his phage group, and Andre Lwoff, Francois Jacob, and Jacques Monod at the Pasteur Institute. Later Benzer returned to Purdue.

In classical genetics the gene was thought to be an indivisible entity; Benzer realized that if Watson and Crick's DNA model was correct, "then each gene is not a mathematical point but a linear segment, and that crossing-over should be able to occur within a gene." Benzer spent the next 10 years studying the rII region of phage mutants, as it was found to be very suitable and "an extraordinarily sensitive and simple assay" for detection of rare crossing-over events in a gene. When this field of study became more popular, Benzer abandoned it and started to work on a completely new area; that was very characteristic of Benzer throughout his career.

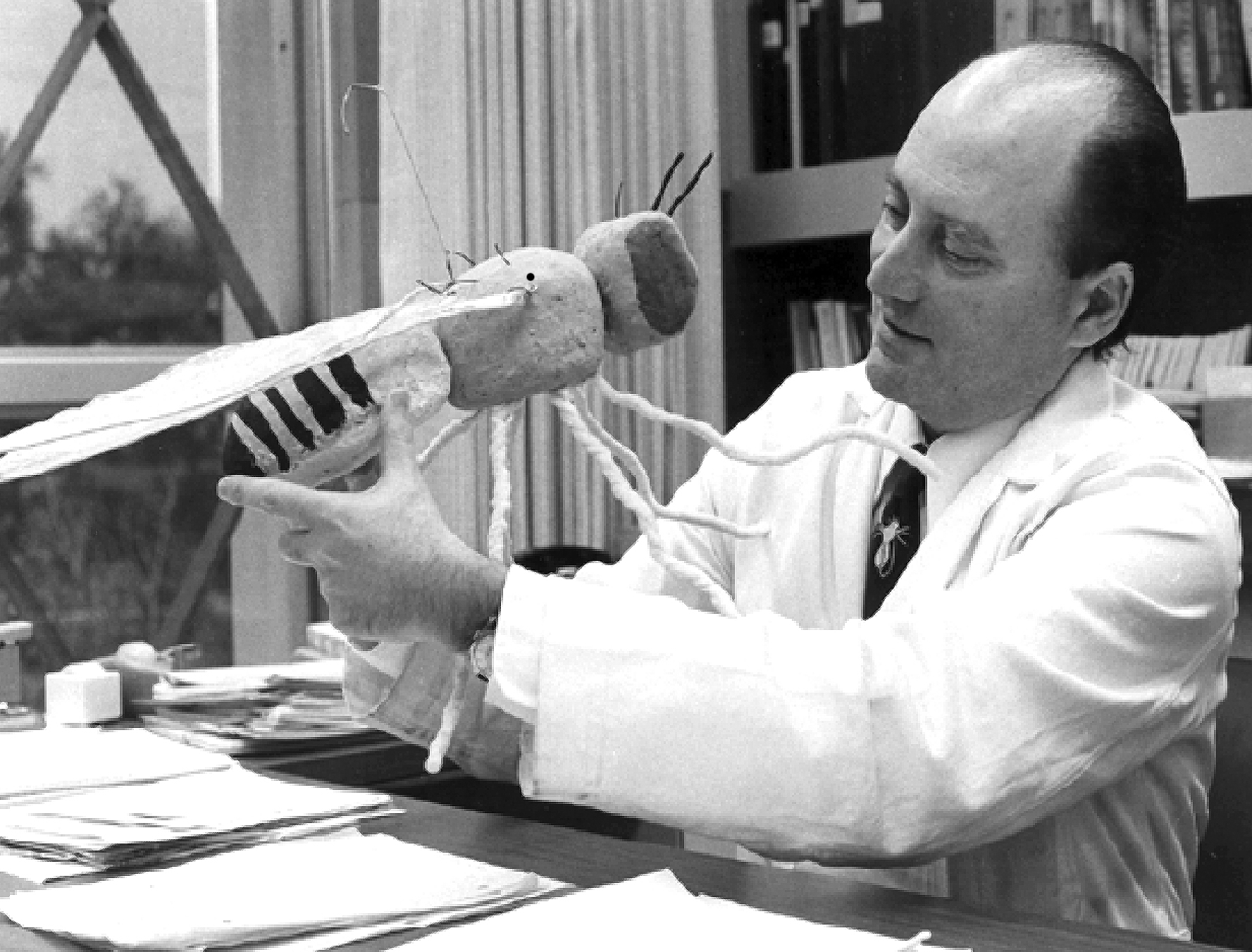
Seymour Benzer in his office at Caltech in 1974 with a big model of Drosophila

Benzer was interested by how different the personalities of his two daughters were. As the environment was the same, he reasoned that the cause should be in the genes. He chose Drosophila as his model organism. In his 1967 paper in Proc. Natl. Acad. Sci. USA, "Behavioral mutant of Drosophila isolated by countercurrent distribution", he showed "that one can treat a fly as an 'atom of behavior' and profoundly change its behavior by introducing single-gene mutations". Benzer worked with flies from 1967 to 1980.

The book is focused on three of the most specific types of mutants found during this period: "'Time' mutants that have an altered circadian clock, 'Love' mutants that are unable to perform the fly's intricate courtship behavior properly, and 'Memory' mutants that are unable to learn or remember."

As summarized in The New York Times review:

Benzer [...] studied time, love and memory in fruit flies to see how genes govern behavior. Fruit flies wake up at dawn and go to sleep at night even when they are in a sealed room and never see the sun. Fruit flies also have elaborate courtship rituals and mating behavior: love. And surprisingly, experiments [...] have proved that flies can learn, for example, how to avoid electric shocks. That is, they have memory.

== Reception ==
Time, Love, Memory received several reviews in peer-reviewed journals. Charles Jennings in his 1999 review for Nature Neuroscience wrote that the science in the book is "for the most part, accurate and clearly explained" and noted that "it is remarkable how much intellectual history has been spanned in Benzer's career". But, in his opinion "it never really attempts a critical evaluation of what fruitflies have contributed to our understanding of behavior. Have Drosophila geneticists succeeded in isolating 'atoms of behavior', as Benzer once hoped? For Weiner's three core examples—time, love and memory—I would answer no, not yet, and a tentative yes." Historian of biology Jane Maienschein in the review for the Journal of the History of Biology noted Weiner's "keen sense of history: of traditions, connectedness, and chains of influence" that resulted in a "beautifully crafted study". She observed "the scientist's empathy for the 'timeless', 'fruitless', and 'dunce' mutants that are deficient in time, love, and memory. We discover that fruit flies can learn, and we see scientists grappling with the questions of what free will might mean – and whether it matters." Additionally, she remarked on "the allusions to philosophy, literature, and popular culture" that "are much richer than in most history of science writing".

Biologist Yuh-Nung Jan wrote in a review for Cell mostly positively, but criticized the portrayal of Max Delbrück in the book; "I don’t think Weiner quite captured the essence of Delbrück; his immense intellect, his unique personality, his moral integrity, and his almost magical influence on people who came into contact with him." (Note: Delbrück was Jan's PhD adviser.) One more flaw highlighted in the review is Weiner's treatment of the three titular mutations as "parallel and equal stories"; in Jan's view the work on Drosophila "points the way and provides the conceptual framework for the study of clocks in other organisms", but, in comparison, it contributed less into fields of learning and memory. Despite these points, Jan called Time, Love, and Memory "a terrific book that will appeal to a wide range of readers."

A review by The New York Times noted that the book is about a "fascinating history", but stated that "in the second half of the book we almost lose sight of Benzer [...] and we sometimes lose Weiner's narrative thread as well". Kirkus Reviews wrote that Weiner is good in "explaining the science with you-are-there descriptions of lab life and personalities" and "telling anecdotes that reveal the humor, quirks, frustration, anger, and rewards of being a scientist". The Journal of Young Investigators noted that while Benzer's work is highly influential in genetics "Benzer is little more than a footnote in most textbooks. Due to the highly private life he led, his unusual dusk to dawn working hours, and his tendency to keep to the fringes of scientific research, Benzer's story has long gone unheralded." The review praised the book for unfolding the story of Benzer's life and work.

The book won the American National Book Critics Circle Award for General Nonfiction in 1999.

Biologist and the Brain Prize winner Ed Boyden said in several interviews that the book is one of his favourites and influenced him a lot; "I love it because it shows science in action ― not like a textbook [...] ― it shows people struggling with ambiguity and wrestling with all sorts of difficulty, and it’s very entertaining. For a while I would read that every year, once a year."

== See also ==
- Drosophila circadian rhythm — a daily 24-hour cycle of rest and activity in the fruit flies.
