= Richard Springer =

American anti-nuclear activist

Rick Springer
- Born: Richard Paul Springer; 1951
- Died: September 26, 2010 (aged 58–59)
- Occupation: Anti-nuclear activist
- Known for: 1992 interruption of Ronald Reagan speech

Richard Paul "Rick" Springer (c. 1951 – September 26, 2010) was an American anti-nuclear activist. He was best known for his arrest after smashing a crystal eagle award in front of former US president Ronald Reagan at a luncheon in 1992. Springer faced imprisonment on various charges.

== Biography ==
Early in life Richard Springer worked as a carpenter, a youth counselor, and a merchant seaman.

=== Anti-nuclear activism and Ronald Reagan incident ===
In the early 1990s Springer founded the Hundredth Monkey Project, which he hoped would be a "massive set of concerts and demonstrations" bringing together anti-nuclear activists. The project never fully materialized; however, on the weekend of April 10 to 12, 1992, a more modest gathering of 2,000 people assembled in the desert near the Nevada Test Site for a series of concerts and speeches organized by Springer.

On April 13, many participants traveled to Las Vegas for a demonstration at a US Department of Energy office, during which 24 people were arrested. The same day, Springer walked onto the stage of a National Association of Broadcasters luncheon in Las Vegas while former president Ronald Reagan was addressing the attendees. On stage, Springer smashed a 30-pound (14-kilogram) crystal statue that had earlier been presented to Reagan and then attempted to commandeer the microphone into which Reagan was speaking. Shards of the statue hit Reagan in the head. Springer was quickly swarmed by Secret Service agents and dragged off-stage.

Springer had accessed the luncheon using a press credential issued by Indian Voices, a Native American affairs newsletter. At the time, the Secret Service did not have a policy of examining the press credentials of persons attending appearances by former presidents.

=== Charges and imprisonment ===
Following the luncheon incident, Springer was arraigned and released on his own recognizance pending trial. The following week he was interviewed by CBS This Morning about the incident, and explained that he was hoping to raise awareness about the dangers of nuclear testing. He offered Reagan an apology, stating that he was committed to non-violence and regretted any concern he had caused for Reagan's safety.

The following February, Springer pled guilty to a misdemeanor charge of interference with the Secret Service and was sentenced to four months in jail. He was due to surrender himself to the authorities June 2, 1993. Instead, however, he sent a fax to a Nevada television station saying he would not surrender himself until the US government began adhering to all treaties "calling for the cessation of all nuclear weapons tests in all atmospheres for all time". Springer also sent a letter to the U.S. District Court for the District of Nevada denouncing the United States as an "oppressor nation" and alleging mistreatment of the Shoshone. Five days later an arrest warrant was issued for Springer.

Springer was apprehended two months later and charged with failure to surrender. In his subsequent trial, he pled not guilty, stating that a higher moral law required he continue anti-nuclear activism rather than go to prison. His first trial on the new charges resulted in a hung jury; however, he was convicted on a second attempt and sentenced to prison, being released in 1995.

=== Later life and suicide ===
In 1997 Springer published a book, Excuse Me, Mr. President: The Message of the Broken Eagle.

After his release from prison, Springer lived for a time in Arcata, California, with artist Carol Andersen and her two children. Andersen's children later reported that Springer was abusive and an alcoholic. In later years, Springer lived on a ranch in Gerlach, Nevada. He died two weeks after his 2010 wedding of an apparently self-inflicted gunshot wound.

== See also ==
- Comprehensive Nuclear-Test-Ban Treaty
