= WePlanet =

Alliance of environmental organizations

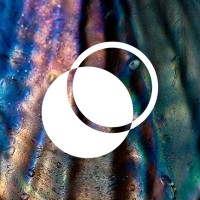
- WePlanet logo
- Founders: Amardeo Sarma, Rudy Rabbinge
- Type: International NGO
- Legal status: active
- Purpose: Environmentalism; Nature conservation; Ecology
- Headquarters: August Reyerslaan 80, 1030 Brussels
- Region served: Worldwide
- Methods: Advocacy; lobbying
- President: Adam Błażowski
- Secretary General: Karolina Lisslö Gylfe
- Advisor: Mark Lynas
- Website: weplanet.org

WePlanet is an alliance of several environmental organizations, worldwide. According to the organization's website, the alliance is made up of organizations from eighteen countries. (Note: The countries are: Finland, Sweden, Poland, Germany, France, Netherlands, Belgium, UK, Portugal, Kenya, Uganda, Australia, Denmark, Norway, Ukraine, Italy, Bangladesh, Nigeria, and Zimbabwe.) Launched in the 2010s as "RePlanet", its name was changed to "WePlanet" in 2023 citing potential conflicts with existing companies following expansion.

WePlanet and most of its affiliate national organizations are associated with an ecomodernist environmental philosophy. Ecomodernism places emphasis on pragmatic, evidence-based and science-backed solutions to address the problems created by the environmental crisis. Ecomodernism also advocates the benefits of technical progress for the environment. Young ecomodernist activists claim that older environmental NGOs and established green parties have often stuck to anti-technology positions inherited from the 20th century, which the new urgency of climate change should have led them to question

Critics of WePlanet have often targeted ecomodernism in general, including attacking its reliance on Technological fix, and portraying its view of eco-economic decoupling as dystopian. UK environmentalist George Monbiot has criticized ecomodernists for their assumed subservience to corporate interests as well as for their irrational faith in a literal and unidimensional view of modernization. Monbiot appears, however, to view WePlanet as different from the ecomodernist mainstream, because he has teamed up with them for the "Reboot food" campaign. This has, in turn, led to Monbiot becoming the target of critics from anti-GMO activists for this supposed about-face and WePlanet being accused of astroturfing.

WePlanet claims to differ from the technocentrist tendencies of ecomodernism by advocating rewilding as a non-technical objective, associated with land-sparing agriculture

== Activities ==
=== Nuclear energy advocacy ===
This is the most visible rift between the newer environmental organizations like WePlanet and the older established ones. WePlanet and affiliate national organizations are known for advocating nuclear energy as a safe, dense and clean source of energy that is more indispensable than ever for decarbonisation by way of massive electrification. This has led to several campaigns to oppose shutting down existing nuclear power plants, among which a 2023 open letter to German chancellor Olaf Scholz, initiated by WePlanet (Replanet at the time) and signed by two dozen scientists and Nobel laureates.

WePlanet Africa have also led a pro-nuclear campaign of their own.

A campaign, "Dear Greenpeace", urging Greenpeace to take into account the climate emergency to abandon its entrenched opposition to nuclear power has been led by a group of young activists from Weplanet, with Ia Aanstoot at the forefront, casting Greenpeace as, by contrast, an "old-fashioned" organization clinging to the long-held positions of its 1970s founders.

=== "Switch off Putin" ===
In the wake of the war in Ukraine, WePlanet has issued two reports under this title, advocating strong restrictive measures to curtail import of oil and gas from Russia, as well as limitations on the use of biofuels to address the food crisis resulting from reduced exports from Ukraine.

=== New gene technologies ===
In January 2024, on the occasion of the discussion and vote by the EU parliament of new regulations applying to organisms modified by "new genomic techniques" (arising from the use of the newer CRISPR-based gene editing tools), WePlanet initiated an open letter to EU lawmakers.

=== Reboot Food ===
As advocated by, among others, George Monbiot, the huge share of the world's land dedicated to the production of meat, with a huge direct impact on biodiversity and climate change, could get progressively reduced if new technologies such as precision fermentation were used to produce protein, with a gain in efficiency of land-use by a factor of around 40000. The land thus reclaimed from its use for meat production could get rewilded, with large-scale benefits in terms of biodiversity, carbon storage and recreational activities.

=== Reduce charcoal use ===
This campaign initiated by WePlanet African chapters is intended to raise awareness about all the negative impacts of the use of charcoal as a fuel. Charcoal and other wood fuels are responsible for a large share of the deforestation in Africa and developing countries, and are also catastrophic in terms of indoor air pollution. Deaths caused by indoor pollution are said to have increased by 60% from 1990 to 2017, according to a UNICEF report. The campaign promotes alternative solutions such as clean cookstoves and renewable energy sources.

== Affiliate national organizations ==
- Finland: Suomen ekomodernistit
- Sweden: Ekomodernisterna
- Poland: FOTA4climate
- Germany: Eco-Progressive Network//WePlanet DACH
- France: WePlanet France
- Netherlands: WePlanet Nederland
- Belgium: WePlanet Belgium
- Australia: WePlanet Australia
- Africa: wePlanet Africa
- Norway: WePlanet Norway
