= T4 rII system =

Experimental system for studying the substructure of the gene

The T4 rII system is an experimental system developed in the 1950s by Seymour Benzer for studying the substructure of the gene. The experimental system is based on genetic crosses of different mutant strains of bacteriophage T4, a virus that infects the bacteria Escherichia coli.

== Origin ==
One type of mutation in the T4 bacteriophage identified by researchers in phage genetics by the 1950s was known as r (for rapid), which caused the phage to destroy bacteria more quickly than normal. These could be spotted easily because they would produce larger plaques rather than the smaller plaques characteristic of the wild type virus. Through genetic mapping, the researchers had identified specific regions in the T4 chromosome, called the rI, rII, and rIII loci, associated with the r mutants. In 1952, while performing experiments with rII mutants, Seymour Benzer found a strain that did not behave normally. By 1953, after the publication of Watson and Crick's proposed structure of DNA, Benzer hit on the idea that the apparently defective r mutants might have been the result of crossing two different rII mutants, each of which had part of the rII gene intact, so that the hybrid strain did not exhibit the r phenotype at all because it combined the intact parts of the rII gene.

From there, Benzer saw that it would be possible to generate many independent r mutants, and by measuring the recombination frequency between different r strains, he could map the substructure of a single gene. Although the chance of successful recombination between any mating pair of rII mutants is small, a single petri dish could be the basis for millions of trials at once. They could be screened easily by using a specific strain of E. coli, known as K12 (λ), that was susceptible to wild type T4 but not to r mutants.

Benzer's concept was quite controversial within classical genetic thought, in which each gene is treated as a singular point along a chromosome, not a divisible stretch of nucleic acids (as implied by the work of Watson and Crick). Initially, Max Delbrück—a respected phage geneticist and leader of the so-called phage group of which Benzer was a part—found Benzer's idea outrageous.

== Benzer's work ==
Beginning in 1954, Benzer put the T4 rII system to use, creating and crossing hundreds of r mutants and developing an increasingly detailed map of the structure of the rII gene. In his early work, he identified two separate but very close loci within the rII region, which he suggested were nucleotide sequences that encoded different polypeptides; he called these "cistrons".

Benzer identified a number of different types of r mutants. Some he classified as deletions, others as point mutations. By various crosses of the many different strains exhibited deletions and point mutations, Benzer located each point mutation into a sub-region of one of the cistrons, and ordered the point mutations within that sub-region. Benzer also proposed missense and nonsense mutations from his rII studies. The T4 rII system enabled Benzer to identify recombination frequencies as low as .02%, much lower than in typical genetics experiments. This was equivalent to detecting recombination between only one or two base pairs.

In the early 1950s the prevailing view was that the genes in a chromosome acted like discrete entities, indivisible by recombination and arranged like beads on a string. The experiments of Benzer using mutants defective in the T4 rII system, during 1955-1959, showed that individual genes have a simple linear structure and are likely to be equivalent to a linear section of DNA (see also Phage group).

== Work by others ==
After Benzer demonstrated the power of the T4 rII system for exploring the fine structure of the gene, others adapted the system to explore related problems. For example, Francis Crick and others used one of the peculiar r mutants Benzer had found (a deletion that fused the A and B cistrons of rII) to demonstrate the triplet nature of the genetic code.

The principal that three sequential bases of DNA code for each amino acid was demonstrated in 1961 using frameshift mutations in the rIIB gene of bacteriophage T4 (also see Crick, Brenner et al. experiment).

Richard Feynman, the renowned Caltech theoretical physicist, worked on the T4 rII system during the summer of 1961, and his experimental results were included in a publication by Edgar et al. These authors showed that recombination frequencies between rII mutants are not strictly additive. The recombination frequency from a cross of two rII mutants (a x d) is usually less than the sum of recombination frequencies for adjacent internal sub-intervals (a x b) + (b x c) + (c x d). Although not strictly additive, a systematic relationship was observed that likely reflects the underlying molecular mechanism of recombination (see genetic recombination and synthesis dependent strand annealing).
