= Nucleareurope =

Trade association for the nuclear energy industry in Europe

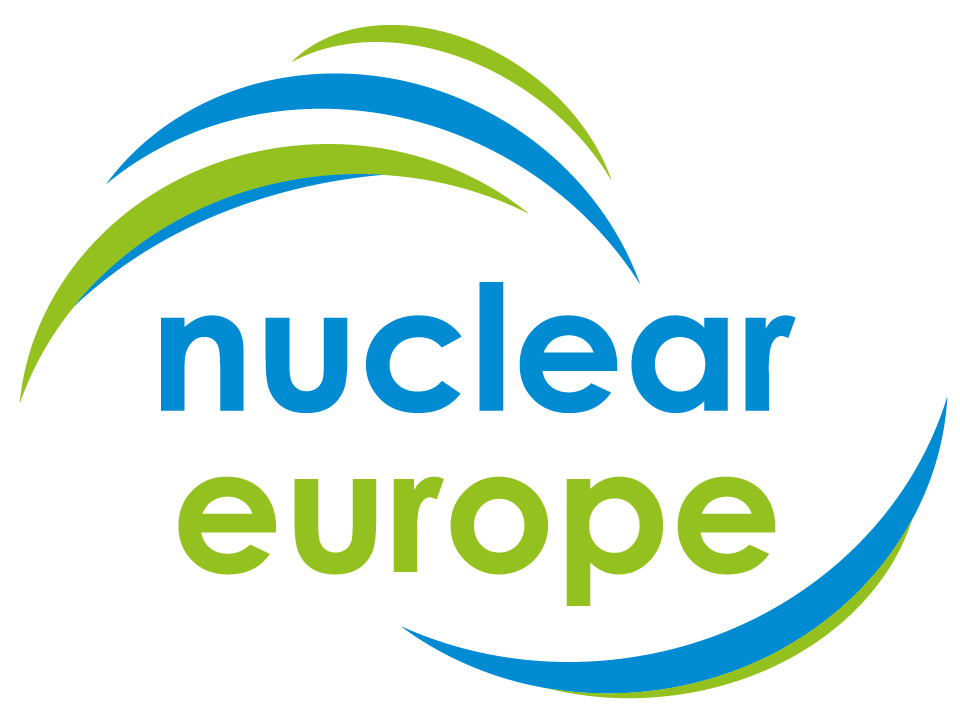
nucleareurope

nucleareurope (formerly FORATOM, European Atomic Forum - Forum Atomique Européen), is the Brussels-based trade association for the nuclear energy industry in Europe. Its main purpose is to promote the use of nuclear power in Europe.

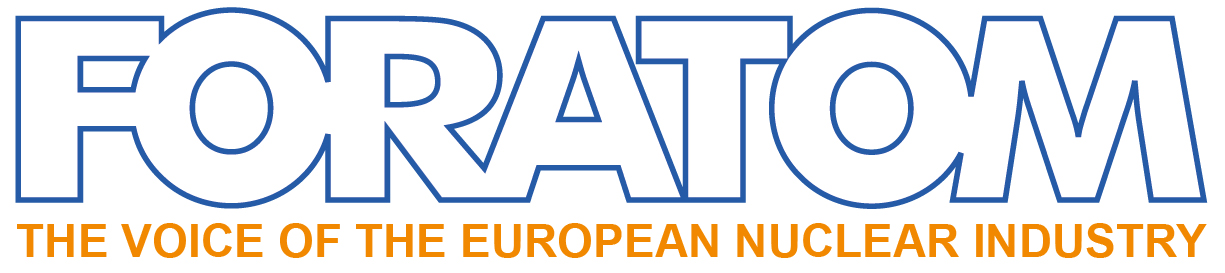

The current Director General of FORATOM is Yves Desbazeille.

FORATOM estimated that in 2016 it spent between €300,000 - €399,999 on lobbying EU institutions.
