= Bryony Worthington, Baroness Worthington =

British environmental campaigner and life peer

The Right Honourable The Baroness Worthington
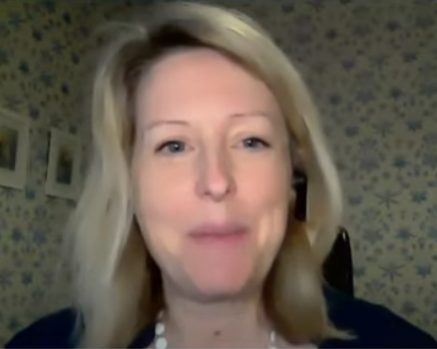
- Speaking at the 2021 World Economic Forum

Member of the House of Lords
- Lord Temporal
- Life peerage 31 January 2011

Personal details
- Born: 19 September 1971 (age 55)
- Party: Independent (since 2017)
- Other political affiliations: Labour (before 2017)
- Education: Queens' College, Cambridge

Bryony Katherine Worthington, Baroness Worthington, (born 19 September 1971), is a British environmental campaigner and life peer in the House of Lords. She has promoted change in attitudes to the environment, and action to tackle climate change. In 2008 she founded Sandbag (Ember since March 2020), a non-profit campaign group designed to increase public awareness of emissions trading.

== Biography ==
Worthington was born and grew up in Wales. She attended Queens' College, Cambridge, where she read English literature. Upon graduation she joined Operation Raleigh as a fundraiser. In the mid 1990s, she worked for an environmental charity, and by 2000 had moved to work for Friends of the Earth as a climate change campaigner. She then worked for the Department for Environment, Food and Rural Affairs, implementing public awareness campaigns and helping draft the Climate Change Bill, before becoming head of government relations for the energy company, Scottish and Southern Energy. She left to form Sandbag in 2008.

She was created a life peer on 31 January 2011 with the title Baroness Worthington, of Cambridge in the County of Cambridgeshire, and sat on the Labour benches, until redesignating as a non-affiliated member in April 2017.

== Climate Change Act ==
Worthington was the lead author in the team which drafted the UK's 2008 Climate Change Act. This landmark piece of legislation requires the UK to reduce its carbon emissions to a level 80% lower than its emissions in 1990. At the time Worthington was working with Friends of the Earth working on their Big Ask campaign, but was seconded to government to help design the legislation.

== Sandbag ==
Worthington launched Sandbag in 2008 to raise public awareness of and improve the European Union's Emissions Trading Scheme (ETS). Initially Sandbag provided members of the public with a way of tackling climate change, enabling them to buy ETS permits and cancel them, meaning that European companies covered by the ETS would have to emit fewer greenhouse gasses. Since that time, Sandbag has changed and grown. With a general remit to "defend against climate risk", Sandbag now focuses on researching and suggesting improvements to the ETS, how to phase out coal-fired power stations in Europe, and how governments and the EU can work to support carbon capture and storage. Worthington has been Sandbag's director since its foundation.

In March 2020, Sandbag was renamed Ember, reflecting its expansion into a global organisation.

== Other campaigning ==
=== Nuclear power ===
Worthington was once "passionately opposed to nuclear power", but came to advocate the adoption of thorium as a nuclear fuel following the 2009 Manchester Report, where she met Kirk Sorensen who presented arguments for using thorium. She has said: "The world desperately needs sustainable, low carbon energy to address climate change while lifting people out of poverty. Thorium based reactors, such as those designed by the late Alvin Weinberg, could radically change perceptions of nuclear power leading to widespread deployment."

Worthington was patron and trustee of The Alvin Weinberg Foundation, a British non-profit, non-governmental organization dedicated to the promotion and development of molten salt reactor (MSR) technology.

In response to an open letter published in The Ecologist in 2015 acknowledging her position on nuclear power, Worthington wrote:

It is clear that as is the case with every technology, there are more appropriate and less appropriate ways of using it and I am no apologist for the mistakes that have been made in the nuclear industry. As a proven source of reliable low carbon energy it would, however, be reckless to rule it out in the fight against climate change just as it would be reckless to rule out large scale hydro, solar, biomass, wind and carbon capture and storage. [...] Nuclear power is the most concentrated source of power available today with the smallest footprint. It is not without its challenges but these are not insurmountable.

=== UNICEF ===
Since 2015 Worthington has been a Trustee at UNICEF.

=== Environmental Defense Fund ===
Worthington was the executive director for Europe of the Environmental Defense Fund between 2016 and early 2020.
