= Seymour Benzer =

American physicist, molecular biologist and behavioral geneticist (1921–2007)

Seymour Benzer FRS
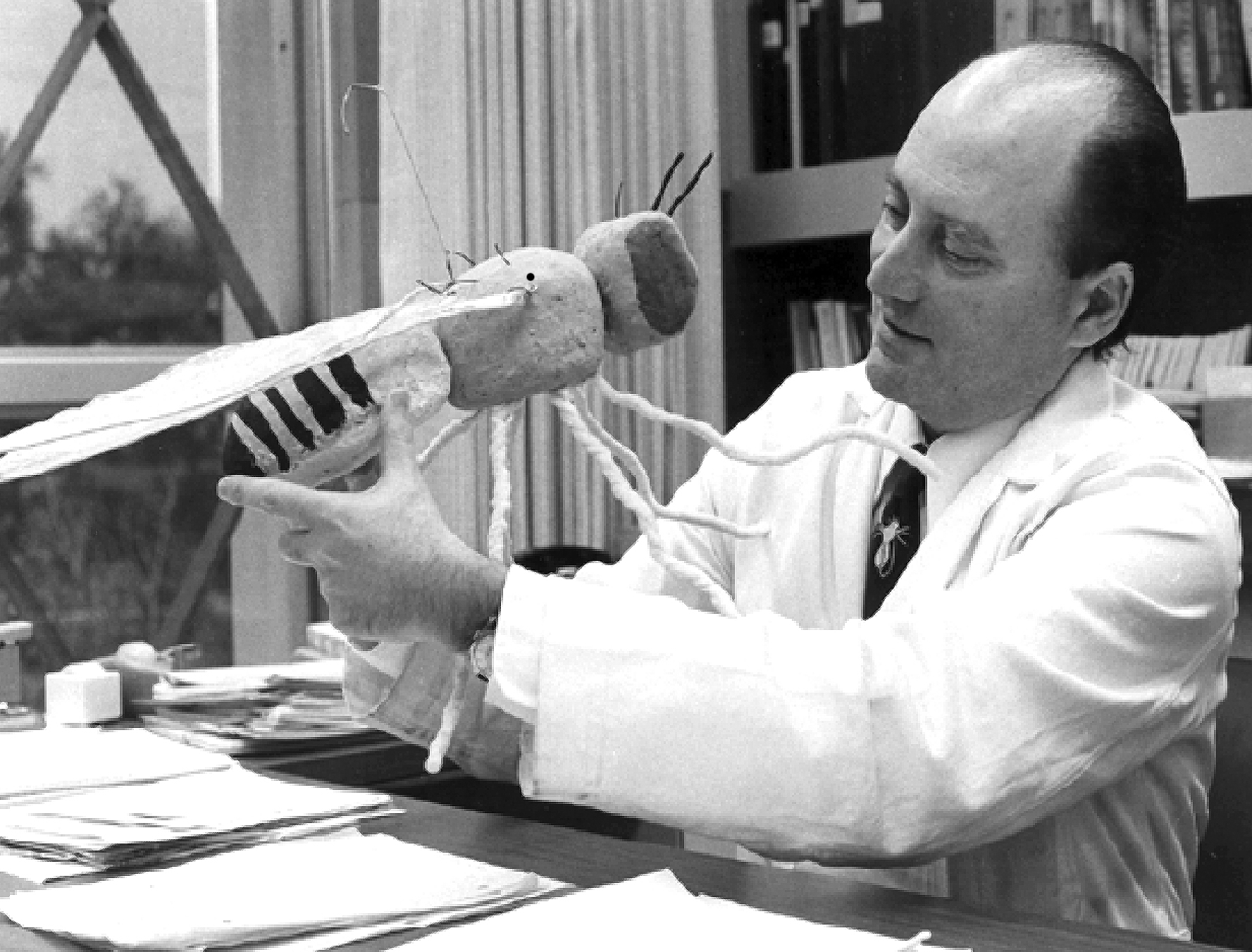
- Benzer with a Drosophila model, 1974
- Born: October 15, 1921; Bensonhurst, New York City, U.S.
- Died: November 30, 2007 (aged 86); Pasadena, California, U.S.
- Education: Brooklyn College (BS); Purdue University (PhD)
- Awards: Gairdner Foundation International Award (1964, 2004); Louisa Gross Horwitz Prize (1976); Harvey Prize (1977); Thomas Hunt Morgan Medal (1986); Wolf Prize in Medicine (1991); Crafoord Prize (1993); Mendel Medal (1994); International Prize for Biology (2000); Gruber Prize in Neuroscience (2004)
- Scientific career
- Fields: Physics, molecular biology, behavioral genetics, chronobiology, neurogenetics
- Workplaces: Purdue University; California Institute of Technology
- Thesis: Photoelectric Effects in Germanium (1947)

Seymour Benzer (October 15, 1921 – November 30, 2007) was an American physicist, molecular biologist and behavioral geneticist. His career began during the molecular biology revolution of the 1950s, and he eventually rose to prominence in the fields of molecular and behavioral genetics. He led a productive genetics research lab both at Purdue University and as the James G. Boswell Professor of Neuroscience, emeritus, at the California Institute of Technology.

== Biography ==
=== Early life and education ===
Benzer was born in the South Bronx to Meir Benzer and Eva Naidorf, both Jews from Poland. He had two older sisters, and his parents favored him as the only boy. One of Benzer's earliest scientific experiences was dissecting frogs he had caught as a boy. In an interview at Caltech, Benzer also remembered receiving a microscope for his 13th birthday, "and that opened up the whole world." The book Arrowsmith by Sinclair Lewis heavily influenced the young Benzer, and he even imitated the handwriting of Max Gottlieb, a scientist character in the novel. Benzer graduated from New Utrecht High School at 15 years old.

In 1938 he enrolled at Brooklyn College where he majored in physics. Benzer then moved on to Purdue University to earn his Ph.D. in solid state physics. While there he was recruited for a secret military project to develop improved radar. He performed research that led to the development of stable germanium rectifiers and discovered a germanium crystal able to be used at high voltages, among the scientific work that led to the first transistor.

=== Personal life ===
At Brooklyn College, as a sixteen-year-old freshman, Benzer met Dorothy Vlosky (nicknamed Dotty), a twenty-one-year-old nurse. He later married her in New York City in 1942. They had two daughters.

Benzer died of a stroke at the Huntington Hospital in Pasadena, California.

== Scientific career ==
=== Molecular biology ===
Upon receiving his Ph.D. in 1947, he was immediately hired as an assistant professor in physics at Purdue. However, Benzer was inspired by Erwin Schrödinger's book What Is Life?, in which the physicist pondered the physical nature of the gene and a "code" of life. This catalyzed Benzer's shift in interest to biology, and he moved into the area of bacteriophage genetics., spending two years as a postdoctoral fellow in Max Delbrück's laboratory at California Institute of Technology, and then returning to Purdue. At Purdue University, Benzer developed the T4 rII system, a new genetic technique involving recombination in T4 bacteriophage rII mutants. After observing that a particular rII mutant, a mutation that caused the bacteriophage to eliminate bacteria more rapidly than usual, was not exhibiting the expected phenotype, it occurred to Benzer that this strain might have come from a cross between two different rII mutants (each having part of the rII gene intact) wherein a recombination event resulted in a normal rII sequence. Benzer realized that by generating many r mutants and recording the recombination frequency between different r strains, one could create a detailed map of the gene, much as Alfred Sturtevant had done for chromosomes. Taking advantage of the enormous number of recombinants that could be analyzed in the rII mutant system, Benzer was eventually able to map over 2400 rII mutations. The data he collected provided the first evidence that the gene is not an indivisible entity, as previously believed, and that genes were linear. Benzer also proved that mutations were distributed in many different parts of a single gene, and the resolving power of his system allowed him to discern mutants that differ at the level of a single nucleotide. Based on his rII data, Benzer also proposed distinct classes of mutations including deletions, point mutations, missense mutations, and nonsense mutations.

Benzer's work influenced many other scientists of his time (see Phage group). In his molecular biology period, Benzer dissected the fine structure of a single gene, laying down the ground work for decades of mutation analysis and genetic engineering, and setting up a paradigm using the rII phage that would later be used by Francis Crick and Sydney Brenner to establish the triplet code of DNA. In addition, Benzer's mapping technique was taken up by Richard Feynman.

In 1967, Benzer left the field of phage genetics and returned to the California Institute of Technology to work in behavioral genetics.

=== Behavioral genetics ===
==== Benzer vs. Hirsch ====
Benzer was one of the first scientists to rise to prominence in the field of behavioral genetics. As the field began to emerge in the 1960s and 70s, Benzer found himself in scientific opposition to another of the field's leading researchers, Jerry Hirsch. While Hirsch believed that behaviors were complex phenomena irreducible to the level of single genes, Benzer advocated that animal behaviors were not too complex to be directed by a single gene. This translated to methodological differences in the two researchers' experiments with Drosophila (fruit flies) that profoundly influenced the field of behavioral genetics. Hirsch artificially selected for behaviors of interest over many generations, while Benzer primarily used forward genetic mutagenesis screens to isolate mutants for a particular behavior. Benzer and Hirsch's competing philosophies served to provide necessary scientific tension in order to accelerate and enhance developments in behavioral genetics, helping it gain traction as a legitimate area of study in the scientific community.

==== Research accomplishments ====
Benzer used forward genetics to investigate the genetic basis of various behaviors such as phototaxis, circadian rhythms, and learning by inducing mutations in a Drosophila population and then screening individuals for altered phenotypes of interest. To better identify mutants, Benzer developed novel apparatuses such as the countercurrent device, which was designed to separate flies according to the magnitude and direction of their phototactic response. Benzer identified mutants for a wide variety of characteristics: vision (nonphototactic, negative phototactic, and eyes absent), locomotion (sluggish, uncoordinated), stress sensitivity (freaked-out), sexual function (savoir-faire, fruitless), nerve and muscle function (photoreceptor degeneration, drop-dead), learning, and memory (rutabaga, dunce).

Benzer and student Ron Konopka discovered the first circadian rhythm mutants. Three distinct mutant types—arrhythmic, shortened period, and lengthened period—were identified. These mutations all involved the same functional gene on the X chromosome and influenced the eclosion rhythm of the population as well as rhythms in individual flies' locomotor activity. To monitor Drosophila locomotor activity, Benzer and postdoctoral researcher, Yoshiki Hotta, designed a system using infrared light and solar cells. All three mutations were mapped to the X chromosome, zero centimorgans away from each other, indicating that the mutant phenotypes corresponded to alleles of the same gene, which Konopka named period. This was the first of several seminal studies of single genes affecting behavior, studies that have been replicated in other animal models and are now the basis for the growing field of molecular biology of behavior. In 1992 Benzer, working with Michael Rosbash, furthered this work by showing that the PER protein, which period codes for, is predominantly located in the nucleus. The work with Period mutants was catalytic in the study of circadian rhythms and served to propel the field forward.

On 2 October 2017, Dr. Rosbash, along with Drs. Michael W. Young and Jeffrey C. Hall, were awarded the Nobel Prize in Physiology or Medicine in recognition of their cloning of circadian rhythm genes, and the elucidation of the biochemical mechanisms by which the circadian rhythm protein products regulated behavior.

Benzer was at the forefront of the study of neurodegeneration in fruit flies, modeling human diseases and attempting to suppress them. He also contributed to the field of aging biology, looking for mutants with altered longevity and trying to dissect the mechanisms by which an organism can escape the inevitable functional downfall and its associated diseases. In 1998, Benzer and his colleagues Yi-Jyun Lin and Laurent Seroude published findings of a long-life mutant in Drosophila, then named Methuselah. The mutant gene coded for a previously unknown member of the GPCR family. By testing against temperature stress, it is thought that these mutants have an increased ability to respond to stress and thus to live longer. One of Benzer's final research projects was on dietary restriction and longevity research. A paper was published, in ''Cell'', on the longevity effect of 4E-BP, a translational repressor, following dietary restriction. Although the research was done before his death, the paper was published afterwards and dedicated to his memory.

=== Cancer research ===
In 1978, Dotty was in the hospital with breast cancer, and Seymour's friend, colleague, and mentor Max Delbrück was diagnosed with cancer. Consequently, Seymour Benzer took interest in cancer biology and attended several conferences on breast cancer. Benzer later remarried with Carol Miller, a neuropathologist. Together, in the early 1980s, they used antibody staining techniques to find nearly identical genes between flies and humans.

== Honors and awards ==
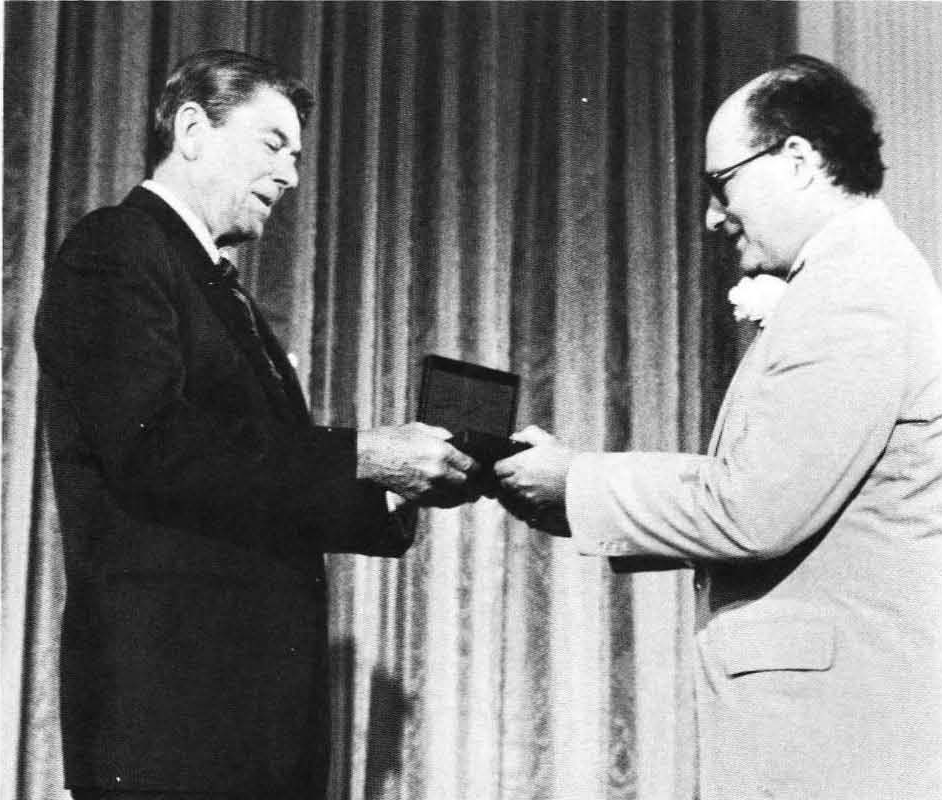
Benzer with Ronald Reagan in 1986

- Fellow of the American Academy of Arts and Sciences (1959)
- Gairdner Foundation International Award (1964)
- Albert Lasker Award for Basic Medical Research (1971)
- Louisa Gross Horwitz Prize from Columbia University (1976),
- Harvey Prize (1977)
- Dickson Prize in Science (1978)
- National Medal of Science (1982)
- Rosenstiel Award (1985)
- Thomas Hunt Morgan Medal (1986)
- Ralph W. Gerard Prize in Neuroscience (1989)
- Wolf Prize in Medicine (1991)
- Crafoord Prize (1993)
- Feltrinelli Prize (1994)
- International Prize for Biology (2000)
- NAS Award in the Neurosciences from the National Academy of Sciences (2001)
- March of Dimes Prize in Developmental Biology (2002)
- Gairdner Foundation International Award (2004) (second award)
- Bower Award and Prize for Achievement in Science (2004)
- Albany Medical Center Prize (2006)

He was a member of the French Academy of Sciences, the U.S. National Academy of Sciences, the American Philosophical Society and the Royal Society.

== Books ==
Benzer is the subject of the 1999 book Time, Love, Memory: A Great Biologist and His Quest for the Origins of Behavior by Pulitzer laureate Jonathan Weiner, and Reconceiving the Gene: Seymour Benzer's Adventures in Phage Genetics by Lawrence Holmes.

== See also ==
- Phage group
- T4 rII system
- Stem-cell research
