= Paul K. Chappell =

American activist

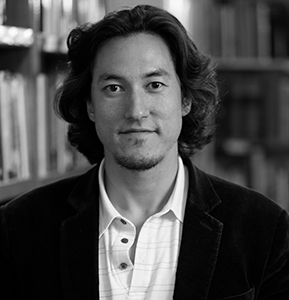
- Paul K. Chappell in Charlottesville, Virginia
- Born: 1980 (age 44–45); Maryland, United States
- Occupation: International Peace Educator
- Known for: Founder of Peace Literacy

Paul K. Chappell (born 1980) is an American activist. He is the Director of the Peace Literacy Institute. A graduate of West Point and a veteran of the war in Iraq, he created the idea of Peace Literacy after his time in the military. He develops the idea further in his seven-book series The Road to Peace where he writes about waging peace, ending war, the art of living, and what it means to be human.

Since 2009 Chappell has offered workshops for educators, activists, community and faith leaders, law enforcement, veterans, and has taught courses on Peace Literacy and Leadership in colleges across the US and Canada. In 2017, Chappell began work with a team of educational experts, coordinated by Sharyn Clough, Director of Phronesis Lab and Professor of Philosophy at Oregon State University, to design and teach Peace Literacy curriculum and assessment for use in public school through adult and higher education.

== Family ==
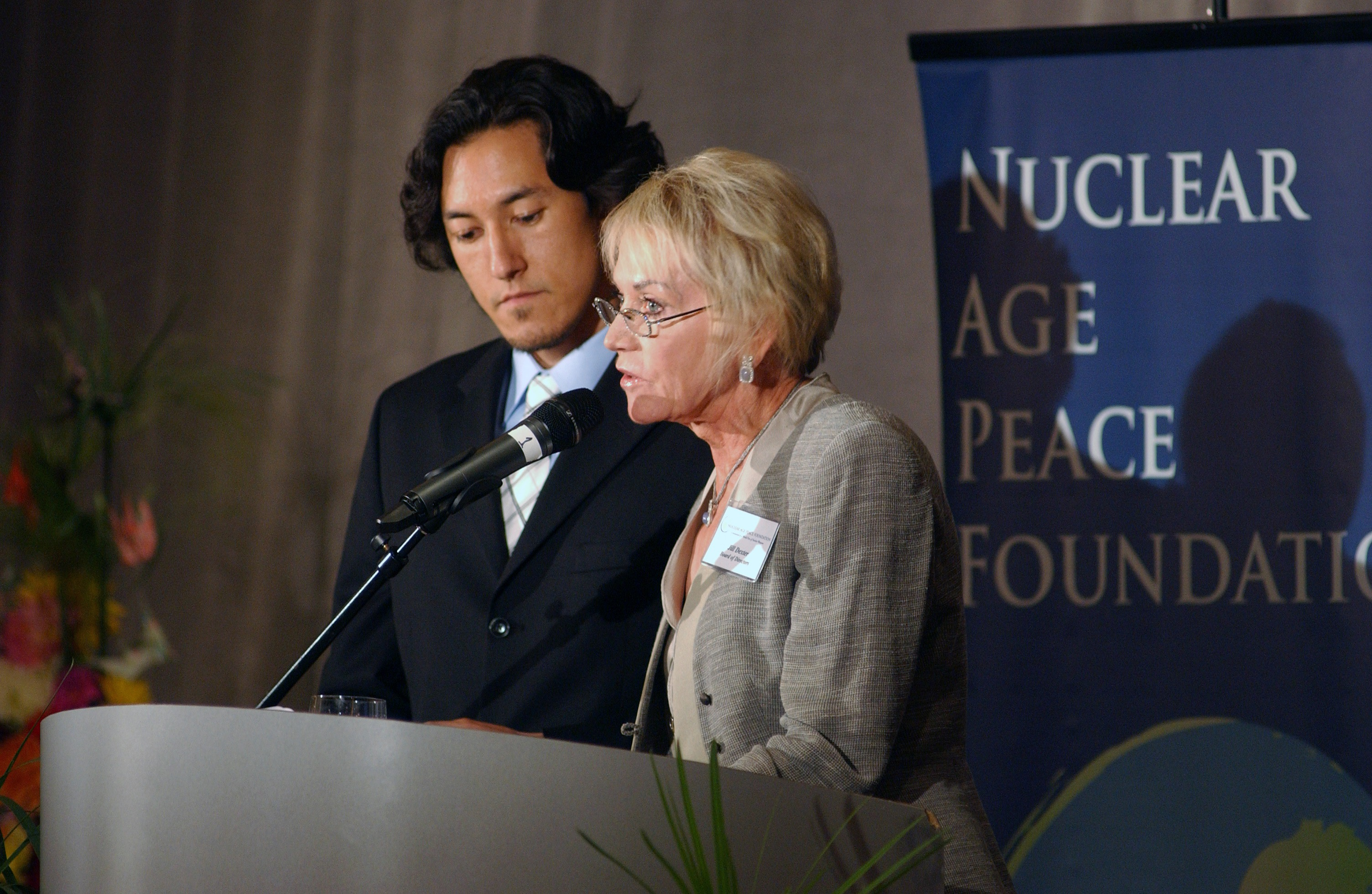
Paul speaking at the Nuclear Age Peace Foundation

Chappell was born in 1980 in Maryland, and was raised in Alabama, an only child in a multi-racial family. His mother is Korean, and moved to the US when she was in her thirties; his father (d. 2004) was Black, and was raised in the segregated South. His father enlisted in the US military and fought in both the Korean and Vietnam wars retiring as a Command Sergeant Major, the highest enlisted rank. When Chappell was 4 years old, his father suffered a major mental break from which he would never recover. Chappell became the victim of his father's war trauma, suffering from violent abuse throughout his school.

Chappell also reported alienation as a racial outcast, rejected by Korean, Black, and white communities. His father's war trauma, his own childhood trauma, and the trauma of racism had devastating and cumulative effects on Chappell who was suspended and expelled numerous times for fighting at school. Chappell writes that he eventually entertained fantasies of shooting everyone in his high school.

== Education ==
Despite his violent upbringing and turbulent educational record through high school, Chappell excelled as a student, and after graduation was accepted to West Point in 1998. As Chappell writes in Will War Ever End, he was obsessed throughout his childhood and teen-age years with the problem of war that had been brought home to him with such violence, but ironically it was in his studies of military history at West Point that Chappell discovered abundant evidence that humans do not have natural impulses to violence against other humans; that in the absence of traumatic catalysts of some kind, violence must be learned, as explored by Lt. Colonel Dave Grossman in On Killing. During his time at West Point, Chappell began to develop the major ideas that are the foundation of Peace Literacy, e.g., that our capacity for conscience and empathy, like language, develop naturally in humans, though these capacities need to be developed.

He wrote the first draft of the book that became Peaceful Revolution in 2001 and graduated from West Point in June 2002 with a major in International Relations and a minor in Systems Engineering.

== Peace literacy ==
Building on models of reading and writing literacy, as well as the nonviolent strategies of global leaders like Martin Luther King Jr. and Gandhi, Chappell's model of peace literacy teaches a strategic approach to peacemaking, focusing on and integrating well-being at the personal, social, and political levels. Broadening and deepening the scope of educational models in Social Emotional Learning, Peace Literacy addresses trauma, including childhood trauma, war trauma, and racial trauma, and the links between these and the social barriers that prevent inclusive and equitable quality education. Anticipating the disruptive effects that emerging technologies such as virtual reality and augmented reality will have on societies around the world, Peace Literacy also provides a framework for understanding the psychological needs these technologies are often used to meet, so that these technologies can be designed and used more responsibly.

Peace literacy has developed into a growing movement of educators, citizen activists, and community leaders who want to empower people with training and skills. Peace Literacy aims to offer the understanding needed to heal the root causes of problems, rather than merely address surface symptoms. Even as education in reading and writing literacy is properly recognized as a universal human right, Chappell's educational team has as a goal the recognition of education in Peace Literacy as a universal human right. According to Chappell, education in Peace Literacy is the human right that empowers us to protect all our other human rights.

== Works ==
=== Books ===
- Will War Ever End? A Soldier's Vision of Peace for the 21st Century. Easton Studio Press. 2009. ISBN 978-1-935073-02-4.
- The End of War: How Waging Peace Can Save Humanity, Our Planet and Our Future. Easton Studio Press. 2010. ISBN 978-1-935212-11-9.
- Peaceful Revolution: How We Can Create the Future Needed for Humanity's Survival. Easton Studio Press. 2012. ISBN 978-1-935212-76-8.
- The Art of Waging Peace: A Strategic Approach to Improving Our Lives and the World. Easton Studio Press. 2013. ISBN 978-1-935212-78-2.
- The Cosmic Ocean: New Answers to Big Questions. Prospecta Press. 2015. ISBN 978-1-63226-009-3.
- Soldiers of Peace: How to Wield the Weapon of Nonviolence with Maximum Force. Prospecta Press. 2017. ISBN 978-1-63226-083-3.

=== Media ===
- Why Peace Is Possible: Exploring the Anatomy of Violence and War. UNE Center for Global Humanities. October 2014 – via YouTube.
