= Stephen Tindale =

Stephen Tindale (29 March 1963 – 1 July 2017) was a British environmentalist who was the executive director of Greenpeace in the United Kingdom from 2000 to 2005. He was director of The Alvin Weinberg Foundation, co-founder of the organisation Climate Answers, associate fellow at the Centre for European Reform and co-author of Repowering Communities with Prashant Vaze.

== Career ==
Tindale was noted for his recent change of heart on the issue of nuclear power, which went counter to his stance while at Greenpeace UK. Along with three other persons who have been involved with the environmental movement, Chris Smith, Mark Lynas and Chris Goodall, he considered that the need to overcome the dangers of rising carbon emissions and subsequent global warming requires a rethinking of anti-nuclear positions amongst the environmental movement. In addition to current nuclear technology, Tindale supported the research and development of the thorium fuel cycle in molten salt reactors to reduce nuclear waste output and increase safety.

On leaving Greenpeace Tindale also endorsed Genetically Modified (GM) foods. Greenpeace remains opposed to GM.

His other past roles included senior research fellow on environment and energy at the Institute for Public Policy Research.
