= Canadian Nuclear Association =

Trade association for the nuclear industry in Canada

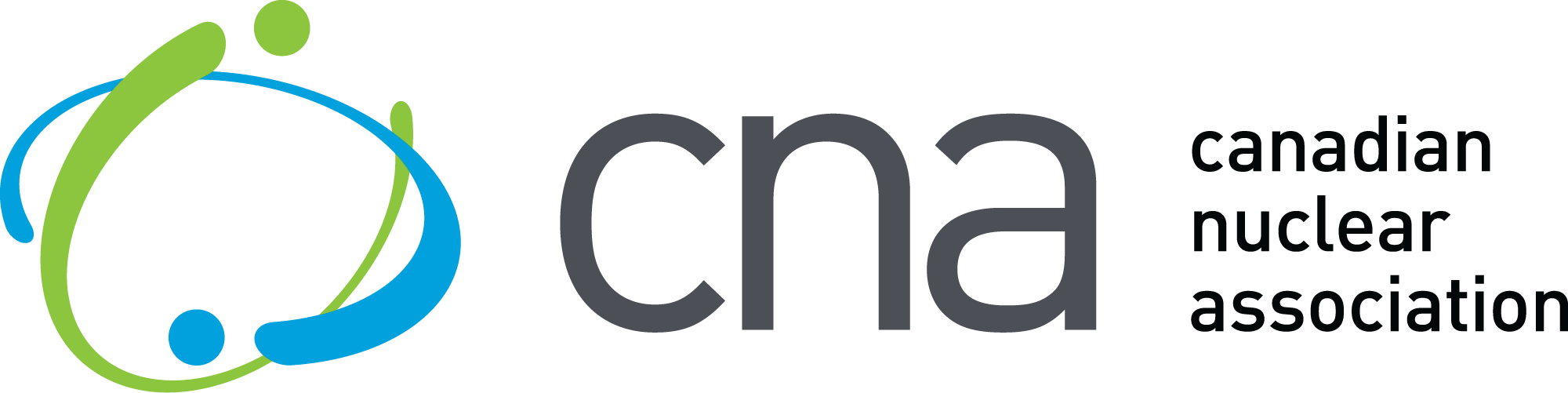
- Formation: 1960; 66 years ago
- Type: trade association
- Purpose: Advocacy
- Headquarters: Ottawa, Ontario
- Location: Canada
- President and CEO: George Christidis
- Website: https://cna.ca/

The Canadian Nuclear Association (CNA), founded in 1960, is the trade association for the nuclear industry in Canada. The CNA undertakes several advocacy tasks related to nuclear technology in Canada, such as participating in relevant regulatory and environmental affairs, public, government, and media relations, education, and also provides several business functions such as conferences and workshops.

== Description ==
Located in Ottawa, Ontario, the CNA comprises over 100 member companies and organizations from across Canada as well as internationally. These companies include operators of nuclear power plants, nuclear reactor designers, engineering firms, suppliers, academic institutions, labour unions, as well as various professional services with business in Canada's nuclear industry such as research consultancies and law firms.

The Canadian Nuclear Association provides public information on the Canadian nuclear industry on topics including:

- Small modular reactors
- Nuclear medicine
- Climate
- Nuclear waste

The CNA works with the Canadian Federal Government, as well as Canadian provincial governments, to promote the role of the nuclear industry in Canada. The President and CEO of the Canadian Nuclear Association is George Christidis, the CNA's former Vice President of Government Relations and International Affairs. The Chair of the Board of Directors is John MacQuarrie, President of the Nuclear Power Group segment of BWX Technologies, Inc.

== International Cooperation ==
The CNA works with other nuclear trade associations, including The World Nuclear Association, Nuclear Energy Institute, Nuclear Industry Association, and European Atomic Forum to promote the global nuclear industry. Recent joint statements include:

- The nuclear industry stands ready to support the IAEA’s efforts to ensure the safety and security of nuclear facilities and staff in Ukraine
- Nuclear energy can enhance energy security and address environmental goals
- Global Nuclear Industry calls for immediate IAEA access to Zaporizhzhya nuclear power plant

== Annual Conference ==
The CNA holds an annual Conference and Trade Show in Ottawa, Ontario. The 2022 Conference was held from 12 to 14 April 2022 with the theme of "Together for Net Zero". Speakers included Gerald Butts, Vice Chairman, Eurasia Group; Ken Hartwick, President and CEO, Ontario Power Generation; Guy Lonechild, Chief Executive Officer, First Nations Power Authority; and Laurie Swami, President and CEO, Nuclear Waste Management Organization (Canada).

== History ==
In January 2021, the CNA and Foratom (now nucleareurope) signed a memorandum of agreement to strengthen their cooperation. Most of Canada's exported uranium is shipped to European countries.

In 2022, the CNA has advocated for the inclusion of nuclear power in the Green Bond Framework, encouraged the Federal government to clarify the role of nuclear in meeting its net zero targets, and promoted the role of Small modular reactors in Canada's oil and gas industry.
