= Jonathan Weiner =

American nonfiction writer (born 1953)

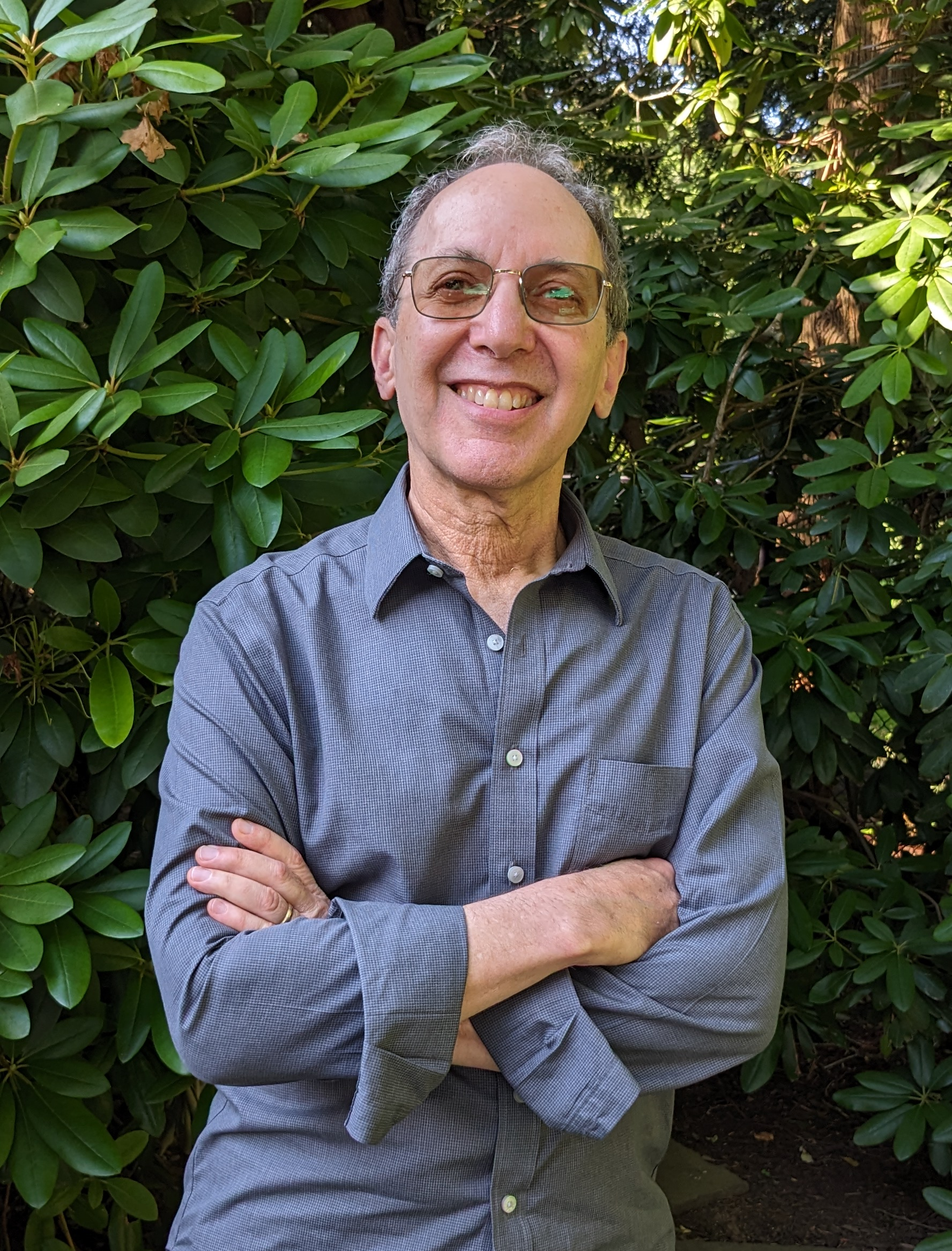
- Born: November 26, 1953 (age 72); New York City, U.S.
- Education: Harvard University
- Writing career
- Genre: Nonfiction
- Notable awards: Pulitzer Prize for General Nonfiction
- Website: Official website

Jonathan Weiner (born November 26, 1953) is an American writer of nonfiction books based on his biological observations, focusing particularly on evolution in the Galápagos Islands, genetics, and the environment.

His latest book is Long for This World: The Strange Science of Immortality (Ecco Press, July 2010) a look at the scientific search for the Fountain of Youth.

He won the 1995 Pulitzer Prize for General Nonfiction and the 1994 Los Angeles Times Book Prize for Science for his book The Beak of the Finch. In 1999 he won the National Book Critics Circle Award and was shortlisted for the Aventis Prize in 2000 for his book Time, Love, Memory about Seymour Benzer.

== Biography ==
Weiner was born November 26, 1953, to a Jewish family in New York City, the son of Ponnie (née Mensch) and Jerome Harris Weiner, an engineer and mathematician. In 1976, he graduated from Harvard University.

Weiner is the Maxwell M. Geffen Professor of Medical and Scientific Journalism at Columbia University Graduate School of Journalism, where he teaches writing about science and medicine. He has taught at Princeton University, Arizona State University and Rockefeller University.

== Personal life ==
In 1982, he married Deborah Heiligman in a Jewish ceremony in Allentown, Pennsylvania. Heligman is a children's writer whose focus is also nonfiction. They live in New York City with their two sons, Aaron and Benjamin.

Deborah Heiligman's book about Emma Darwin and her relationship with Charles, Charles and Emma: The Darwins' Leap of Faith (Henry Holt, January 2009)—"for Middle Readers and Young Adults"—won the inaugural YALSA Award for Excellence in Nonfiction for Young Adults from the American young-adult librarians, as the year's best nonfiction book. It was the runner-up among all young-adult books based on literary merit (Printz Award), as well as for the National Book Award.

== Selected works ==
- Planet Earth (1986), the companion book to the 1986 PBS series of the same name.
- The Next One Hundred Years: Shaping the Fate of Our Living Earth (1990) ISBN 9780553352283, OCLC 23278537
- The Beak of the Finch: A Story of Evolution in Our Time (1994) ISBN 9780679733379, OCLC 919191999
- Time, Love, Memory: A Great Biologist and His Quest for the Origins of Behavior (1999); 2014 ebook
- His Brother's Keeper: A Story from the Edge of Medicine (2004)
- Long for this World: The Strange Science of Immortality (2010) ISBN 9780060765361, OCLC 704039876
