= Scott Carroll (biologist) =

American biologist and ecologist

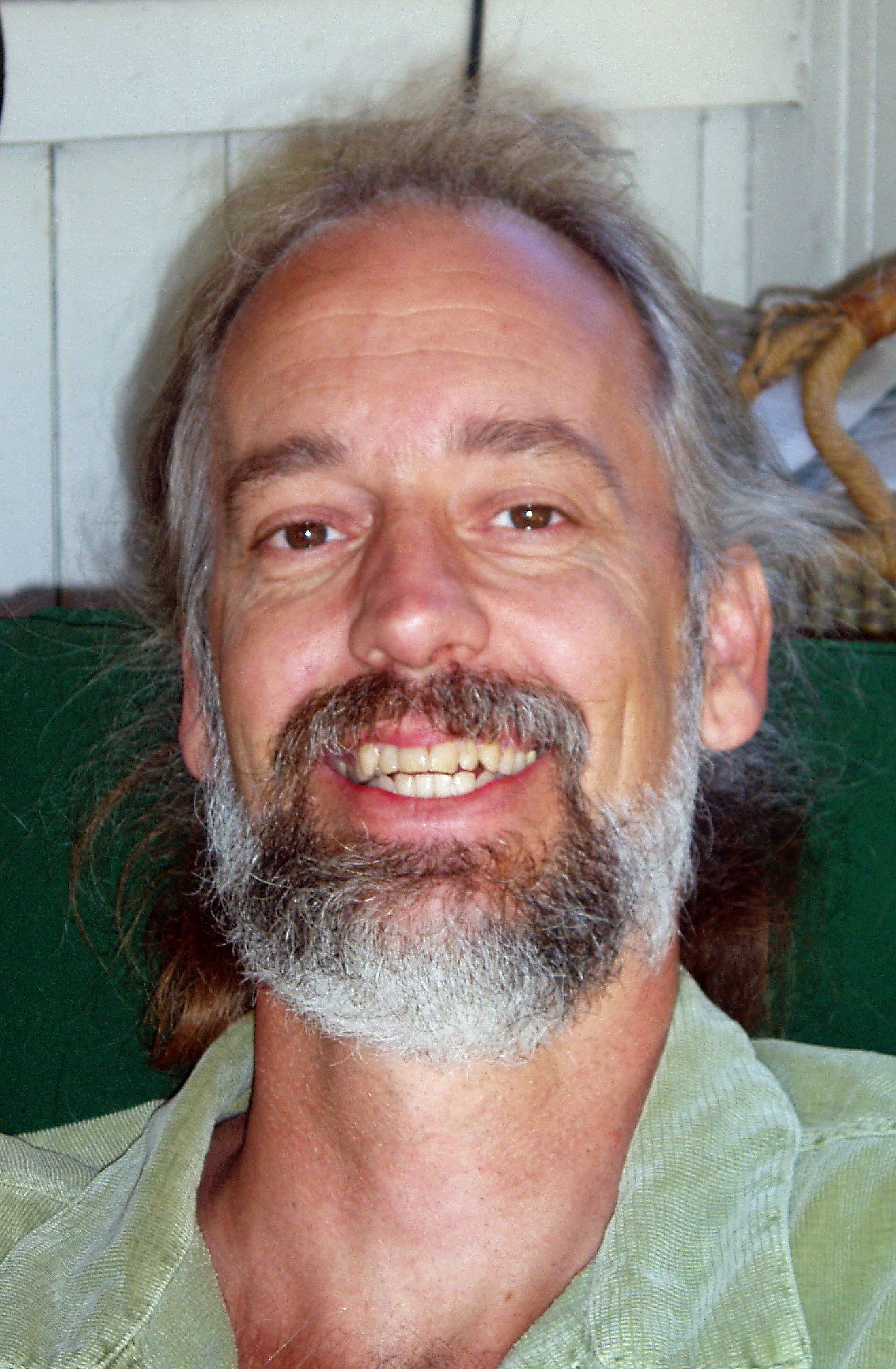
- Scott P. Carroll, evolutionary ecologist, at the Department of Entomology and Nematology, University of California, Davis
- Citizenship: United States
- Education: University of Utah, University of Oklahoma, University of Minnesota
- Scientific career
- Fields: Biology
- Workplaces: University of California, Davis

Scott P. Carroll is an American evolutionary biologist and ecologist affiliated with the University of California, Davis and the University of Queensland. Carroll's main interests are in exploring contemporary evolution to better understand adaptive processes and how those processes can be harnessed to develop solutions to evolutionary challenges in food production, medical care and environmental conservation. With Charles W. Fox, Carroll edited Conservation Biology: Evolution in Action, a book published by Oxford University Press in 2008 in which contributors, across the field of evolutionary biology and conservation, apply evolutionary thinking to concepts and practices in conservation biology, an area of research sometimes called evolutionary ecology. Carroll is founding director of the Institute for Contemporary Evolution.

== Life and career ==
Scott P. Carroll was awarded his Ph.D. in biology at the University of Utah in 1990. He gained his Master of Science in 1983 at the University of Oklahoma, graduating in 1981 with a Bachelor of Science in ecology and behavioral biology (magna cum laude) at the University of Minnesota.

After gaining his Ph.D. Carrol worked as an academic in Costa Rica, first working at the University of California in 1991.

In 2003–04 and again in 2007–08 he was a Fulbright Scholar at University of Queensland.

== Professional practice ==
As a principal of Carroll-Loye Biological Research Consulting, Carroll undertakes insect repellent development, testing and registration, providing US EPA compliant efficacy evaluations of both conventional and biological insect repellents. Amanda Mascarelli of the LA Times has written several articles on insect repellents with the help of Carroll-Loye. In July 2014 Carroll appeared on Good Morning America assisting reporter Becky Worley with a mosquito box in a story comparing DEET based sprays with Picaridin.

== Awards and honours ==
- 2014 Paper ‘Carroll and Corneli 1995’ chosen to lead a virtual issue highlighting influential papers in the first 25 years of the journal Behavioral Ecology.
- 2013 Adaptive versus non‐adaptive phenotypic plasticity and the potential for contemporary adaptation in new environments published in April 2007 (Volume 21) in Functional Ecology selected as one of the top 100 most influential papers ever published by the British Ecological Society (co author with C. K. Ghalambor of Colorado State University, et al.)
- 2012 Plenary Speaker Annual Meeting of the Animal Behavior Society, Albuquerque, New Mexico.
- 2007 Fulbright Inaugural Alumni Initiative Award, Australian-American Fulbright Commission.

== Controversy ==
In conservation biology Carroll cautions against overzealous "native species bias", which he believes may sometimes result in environmentally unwise, expensive and ultimately unsuccessful non-native-species eradication attempts, appearing as one of 19 authors (led by Mark Davis) of "Don't judge species on their origins" in Nature, Issue 7350. This area of conservation biology is hotly debated, the Mark Davis et al. article sparking a response from Daniel Simberloff and another 140 scientists, also in Nature entitled "Non-natives: 141 scientists object." Carroll and co-author Matthew Chew then responded to Simberloff et al. in an opinion piece in The Scientist.

In a special issue of Evolutionary Applications in March 2011, Carroll proposes a conciliatory approach to manage the eco-evolutionary dynamics resulting from interactions of natives with non-natives. Carroll expanded on his views on conciliation biology in an address to the Commonwealth Club of California, "An approach to conservation that reconciles past, present and future landscapes in nature", part of the Commonwealth Club's program “The science of conservation and biodiversity in the 21st century.” Sharon Levy quotes Carroll in OnEarth magazine as saying: "Conciliation biology offers a valuable insight, not that we must give up the fight against invasive species but that we can enlist strong allies in the wild." Ann Hild, a shrub-land ecologist at the University of Wyoming, says: "The heart of Carroll's argument will be hard for many to accept, because it means we're no longer striving for a pristine community of native plants." Levy agrees Carroll's is "the most practical approach in some cases, but preventing new invasions still seems most vital.

== Publications ==
=== Books ===
- 2011 Carroll, SP, Kinnison, M, and Bernatchez, L eds. In the Light of Evolution: Interdisciplinary Challenges in Food, Health and the Environment. Evolutionary Applications 4:155–413.
- 2009 Carroll, SP, ed. Causes and consequences of adaptive evolution. Functional Ecology.
- 2008 Carroll, SP and Fox, CW, eds. Conservation Biology–Evolution in Action. 380 pp. Oxford: Oxford University Press.
- 2007 Hendry, ., Carroll, SP, and Reznick, D, eds. Evolution on Ecological Time-Scales (special feature with nine articles). Functional Ecology 21:387–477.

=== Textbooks ===
Included in:

- Barton, NH, Briggs, DEG, Eisen, JA, Goldstein, DB and Patel, NH, 2007. Evolution. Cold Spring Harbor Laboratory Press, Cold Spring Harbor.
- Boyd, R and Silk, JB, 2008. How humans evolved. WW Norton & Company, New York.
- Frankham, R, Ballou, JD, and Briscoe, DA, 2009. Introduction to conservation genetics, p. 420. Cambridge University Press, Cambridge.
- Freeman, S and Herron, JC, 2007. Evolutionary analysis (4th edition). Benjamin Cummings, New York.
- Freeman, S, 2005. Biological science. Pearson Prentice Hall, New York.
- Futuyma, DJ, 2009. Evolution, pp. 349–350. Sinauer Assoc. Inc., Sunderland, MA.
- Garland, T and Rose, MR, 2009. Experimental Evolution, pp. 181–182. University of California Press, Los Angeles.
- Molles, MC, 2009. Ecology, concepts and applications, pp. 91–98. McGraw-Hill, New York.
- Moore, J and Moore, R, 2006. Evolution 101. Greenwood Publishing Group, Westport, CT.
- Roff, D, 2002. Life history evolution. Sinauer Assoc., Inc., Sunderland, MA.
- Simmons, LW, 2001. Sperm competition and its evolutionary consequences in the insects. Princeton University Press.
- Zimmer, C and Emlen, DJ, 2012. Evolution: Making Sense of Life. Roberts.

=== Popular books ===
Mentioned in:

- Coyne, JA 2010. Why evolution is true. Penguin, New York.
- Weiner, J 1995. The beak of the finch, a story of evolution in our time.

=== Journal articles ===
In order of most citations as of 3 September 2014

- Adaptive versus non‐adaptive phenotypic plasticity and the potential for contemporary adaptation in new environments, Cameron K Ghalambor, John K McKay, Scott P Carroll, David N Reznick, 2007, Functional Ecology, Volume 2, Issue 3, Blackwell Publishing Ltd (cited by 603 as of 3 September 2014).
- Evolution on ecological time‐scales, SP Carroll, AP Hendry, DN Reznick, CW Fox - Functional Ecology, 2007
- Don't judge species on their origins, MA Davis et al. Nature, 2011
- Evolutionary responses of natives to introduced species: what do introductions tell us about natural communities? SY Strauss, JA Lau, SP Carroll - Ecology Letters, 2006
- Host race radiation in the soapberry bug: natural history with the history. SP Carroll, C Boyd - Evolution, 1992
- Genetic differentiation of fitness-associated traits among rapidly evolving populations of the soapberry bug, SP Carroll, H Dingle, SP Klassen - Evolution, 1997
- And the beak shall inherit–evolution in response to invasion, SP Carroll, JE Loye, H Dingle, M Mathieson, TR Famula, MP Zalucki, Ecology Letters 8 (9), 944–951
- Genetic architecture of adaptive differentiation in evolving host races of the soapberry bug, Jadera haematoloma, SP Carroll, H Dingle, TR Famula, CW Fox, Genetica 112 (1), 257–272
- The biology of post-invasion events, SP Carroll, H Dingle - Biological Conservation, 1996
- Rapidly evolving adaptations to host ecology and nutrition in the soapberry bug, SP Carroll, SP Klassen, H Dingle - Evolutionary Ecology, 1998
- Birds, bugs and blood: avian parasitism and conservation, J Loye, S Carroll - Trends in Ecology &Evolution, 1995
- Evolutionary principles and their practical application, AP Hendry et al. Evolutionary Applications, 2011
- Nest ectoparasite abundance and cliff swallow colony site selection, nestling development, and departure time, JE Loye, SP Carroll - Bird–parasite interactions: Ecology, evolution and ..., 1991
- Conciliation biology: the eco‐evolutionary management of permanently invaded biotic systems, SP Carroll - Evolutionary Applications, 2011
