= The Alvin Weinberg Foundation =

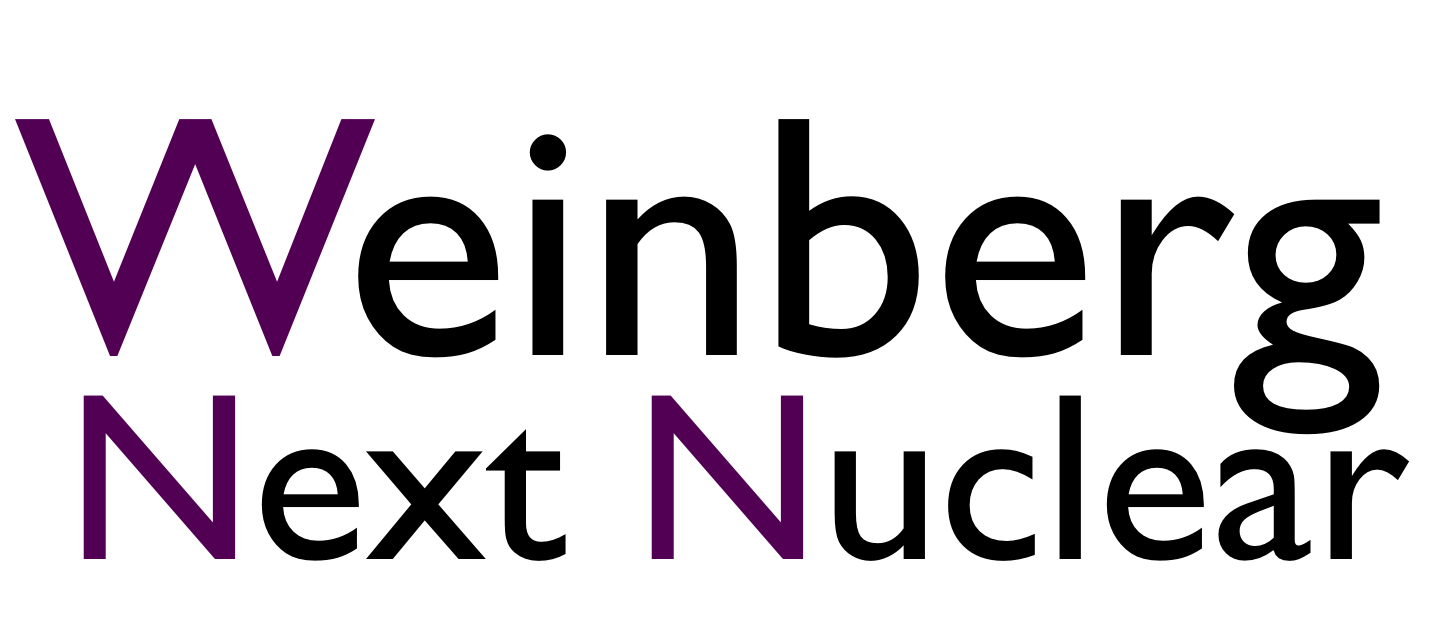
- Named after: Alvin M. Weinberg
- Founded: 2011; 15 years ago
- Dissolved: 2017; 9 years ago
- Type: Foundation
- Purpose: Next-generation nuclear energy
- Headquarters: London, United Kingdom
- Director: Stephen Tindale
- Website: the-weinberg-foundation.org (archived)

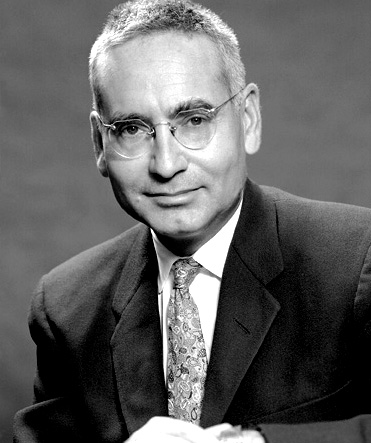
Alvin M. Weinberg (1915–2006)

The Alvin Weinberg Foundation was a registered UK charity, operating under the name Weinberg Next Nuclear, that campaigned for research and development into next-generation nuclear energy. In particular, it advocated advancement of liquid fluoride thorium reactor (LFTR) and other molten salt reactor (MSR) technologies.

It was named for Alvin M. Weinberg, Director of Oak Ridge National Laboratory between 1955–1973 and the main advocate of MSR development.

== History ==
- September 2011: Launched at House of Lords.
- January 2014: Becomes a Registered Charity in England and Wales.
- May 2015: Stephen Tindale joins as Director.
- July 2017: The Weinberg Foundation dissolved.

== People ==
- Baroness Worthington is trustee and patron.
- Stephen Tindale, who led Greenpeace in the UK from 2000 until 2005, was its last Director.

== See also ==
- Generation IV reactor
- Liquid fluoride thorium reactor
- Molten salt reactor
- Thorium-based nuclear power
