= Nuclear energy policy of the United States =

Overview of the nuclear energy policy in the United States of America

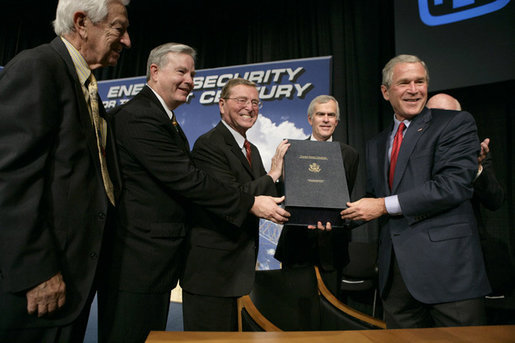
George W. Bush signing the Energy Policy Act of 2005, which was designed to promote US nuclear reactor construction, through incentives and subsidies, including cost-overrun support up to a total of $2 billion for six new nuclear plants.

The nuclear energy policy of the United States began in 1954 and continued with the ongoing building of nuclear power plants, the enactment of multiple pieces of legislation such as the Energy Reorganization Act of 1974, and the implementation of countless policies which have guided the Nuclear Regulatory Commission and the Department of Energy in the regulation and growth of nuclear energy companies. This includes, but is not limited to, regulations of nuclear facilities, waste storage, decommissioning of weapons-grade materials, uranium mining, and funding for nuclear companies, along with an increase in power plant building. Both legislation and bureaucratic regulations of nuclear energy in the United States have been shaped by scientific research, private industries' wishes, and public opinion, which has shifted over time and as a result of different nuclear disasters.

In the United States, there have been a number of legislative actions and policies implemented on a federal and state level to both regulate atomic energy and promote its expansion. The growth of nuclear power in the US ended in the 1980s, however, the Energy Policy Act of 2005 was passed in 2005 which aimed to jump-start the nuclear industry through financial loan-guarantees for expansion and re-outfitting of nuclear plants. The success of this legislation is still undetermined since all 17 companies that applied for funding are still in the planning phases on their 26 proposed building applications. Some of the proposed sites have even scrapped their building plans, and some think the Fukushima Daiichi nuclear disaster will further dampen the success of the expansion of nuclear energy in the United States.

In 2008, the Energy Information Administration projected almost 17 gigawatts of new nuclear power reactors by 2030, but in its 2011 projections, it "scaled back the 2030 projection to just five". Following the Fukushima Daiichi nuclear disaster, public support for building nuclear power plants in the U.S. dropped to 43%, slightly lower than it was immediately after the Three Mile Island accident in 1979, according to a CBS News poll. A survey conducted in April 2011 found that 64 percent of Americans opposed the construction of new nuclear reactors. A survey sponsored by the Nuclear Energy Institute, conducted in September 2011, found that "62 percent of respondents said they favor the use of nuclear energy as one of the ways to provide electricity in the United States, with 35 percent opposed".

In 2022, nuclear energy accounted for 18% of all energy generation in the United States, this was an essential contribution to USA's surpassing a record of 40% energy generation coming from carbon-free sources. While nuclear energy remains a polarizing issue amongst Americans, two-thirds of US states and the US Department of Energy plan to incorporate nuclear energy in their green energy goals.

== History of the Nuclear energy policy of the United States ==
Almost a year after World War II ended, Congress established the United States Atomic Energy Commission (AEC) to foster and control the peacetime development of atomic science and technology. Reflecting America's postwar optimism, Congress declared that atomic energy should be employed not only in the Nation's defense, but also to promote world peace, improve the public welfare, and strengthen free competition in private enterprise. Later legislation enacted by Congress split the AEC into our current Department of Energy and Nuclear Regulatory Commission.

In the United States, the Nuclear Regulatory Commission (NRC) regulates the nuclear energy industry more strictly than most other industries. The NRC and the Department of Energy (DOE), work together to ensure plant safety, building and operational permits, movement and storage of nuclear waste, management of weapons-grade byproducts of plants, radiation protection, and loan guarantees.

The United States has more active nuclear power plants than any other country in the world, with 104 plants out of the total 441 active sites and another 62 under construction worldwide. This is nearly twice as many sites as the next two countries, France (58) and Japan (55), combined. Construction of U.S. nuclear facilities peaked between the 1970s and 1980s, during which time, these facilities were granted 20–40 year operational permits.

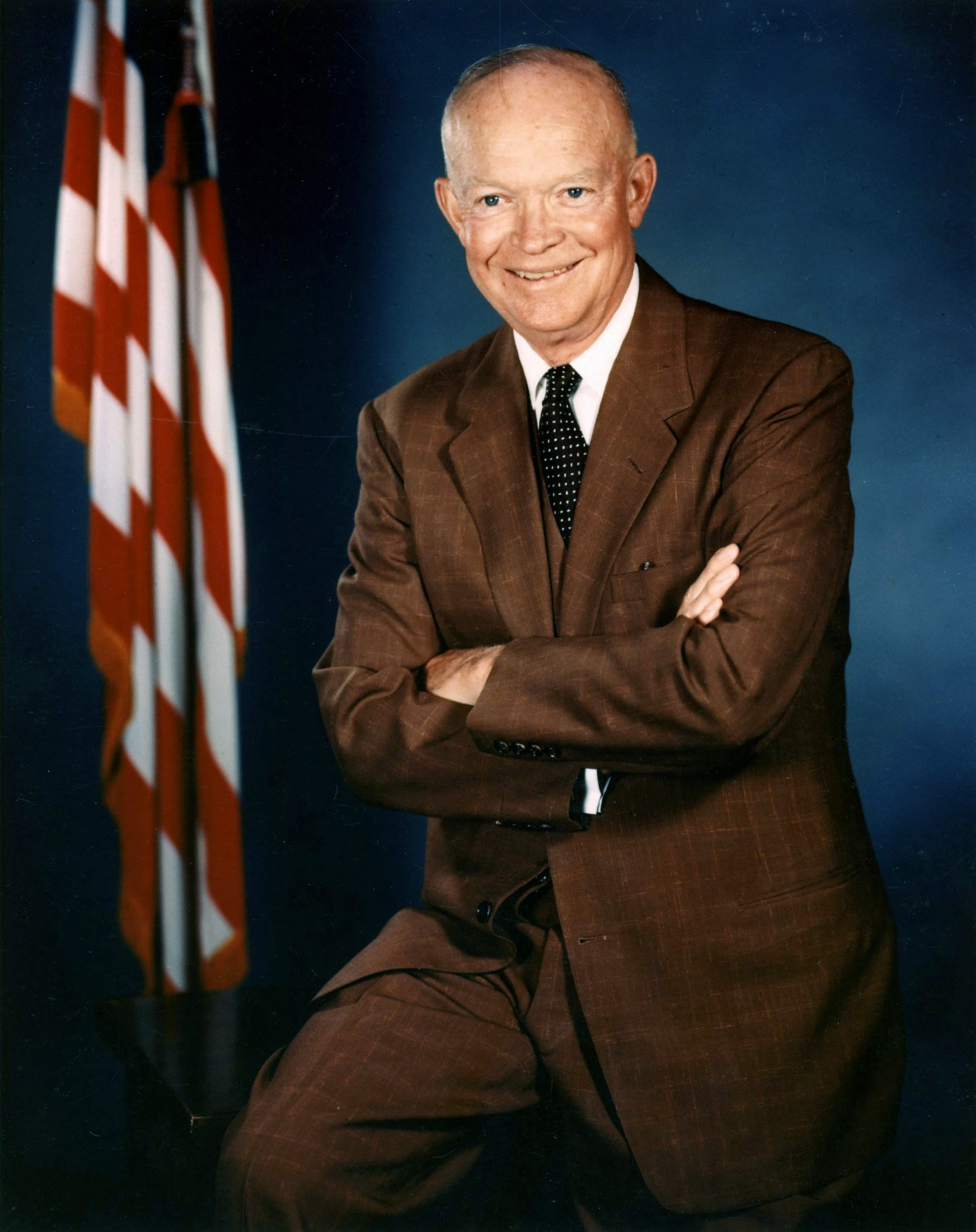
The administration of Dwight D. Eisenhower ushered in the first nuclear age with the Atomic Energy Act of 1954

In the early days of nuclear energy, the United States government did not allow for any private sector use of nuclear technology. In 1946, President Harry Truman signed the Atomic Energy Act of 1946 into law, which prohibited the dissemination of nuclear technology or information to other entities, both domestic and abroad. This act represented the fear that foreign nations, including allies, would gain the technology and use it against the U.S. As time went on, this fear subsided and interest from the public sector emerged, in the hope that nuclear power could provide a viable energy alternative to coal.

The Atomic Energy Act of 1954, also under the administration of Dwight D. Eisenhower, amended the earlier act and ushered in the first nuclear age in the U.S. This amendment allowed the private sector to use certain government information about nuclear technology and establish private energy facilities. However, these facilities would have to abide by government rules and regulations and work closely with the government regarding the plant safety, mining, storage, transportation, and the use of weapons-grade byproducts.

== First nuclear age ==
There were two phases in U.S. nuclear policy. The first phase lasted from approximately 1954 to 1992. By the end of the 1980s, new plants were being built, and after 1992, there was a period of 13 years without any substantial nuclear legislation. The United States was not the first nation to create a nuclear power plant. Both Russia and England managed to establish small, limited power plants before the U.S. Although developments were taking place in the U.S. private sector before the 1954 act, it was not until mid-1956 that the Shippingport Atomic Power Station in Pennsylvania came online. This facility, which generated 60 MW of power, and later up to 200 MW, was the first full-scale nuclear power plant in the U.S. and the world. In the coming years, more and more plants were built by regulated utility companies, often state-based. These companies would "put the capital cost into their rate base and amortize it against power sales. Their consumers bore the risk and paid the capital cost."

Some nuclear experts began to voice dissenting views about nuclear power in 1969. These scientists included Ernest Sternglass from Pittsburgh, Henry Kendall from the Massachusetts Institute of Technology, Nobel laureate George Wald and radiation specialist Rosalie Bertell. These members of the scientific community "by expressing their concern over nuclear power, played a crucial role in demystifying the issue for other citizens", and nuclear power became an issue of major public protest in the 1970s.

=== Energy Reorganization Act of 1974 and NRC governing laws ===
The Nuclear Regulatory Commission was established under the Energy Reorganization Act of 1974. Under the Atomic Energy Act of 1954, a single agency, the Atomic Energy Commission, had responsibility for the development and production of nuclear weapons as well as the development and safety regulation of the civilian uses of nuclear materials. The Act of 1974 split these functions, assigning to one new agency, the Department of Energy, the responsibility for the development and production of nuclear weapons, promotion of nuclear power, and other energy-related work. Regulatory work, excluding regulation of defense nuclear facilities, it assigned to the NRC. The Act of 1974 gave the NRC its collegial structure and established its major offices. The later amendment to the act also provided protections for employees who raise nuclear safety concerns. Applications for new plants are filed with the NRC and usually take between three and five years to be approved. They require detailed reports on all reactor operations, transportation of fuels, enrichment, waste storage, mining of yellowcake, and more. Moreover, the government often "promises to provide incentives for building new plants through loan guarantees and tax credits," backs loans or even direct funding for building, and conducts atomic research to further the field.

The EPA was directed to set standards for radioactive materials under Reorganization Plan No. 3

=== Reorganization plans ===
Reorganization Plan No. 3 was an executive order by President Richard Nixon in 1970, which created the U.S. Environmental Protection Agency (EPA). This plan directed the EPA to establish "generally applicable environmental standards for the protection of the general environment from radioactive material." Reorganization Plan No. 1 of 1980 strengthened the executive and administrative roles of the NRC chairman, particularly in emergencies, transferring to the chairman "all the functions vested in the Commission pertaining to an emergency concerning a particular facility or materials ... regulated by the Commission." This reorganization plan also provided that all policy formulation, policy-related rulemaking, and orders and adjudications would remain vested with the full Commission.

=== Nuclear Non-Proliferation Act of 1978 ===
The Nuclear Non-Proliferation Act of 1978 sought to limit the spread of nuclear weapons. Among other things, it established criteria governing U.S. nuclear exports licensed by the NRC and took steps to strengthen the international safeguards system. This helped ensure the security of the United States. Countries that signed the international Nuclear Non-Proliferation Treaty (NPT) committed to preventing the spread of nuclear weapons in return for U.S. knowledge and materials in the form of nuclear reactors and fuel.

In addition to supplying countries with nuclear technology and materials, the U.S. would aid countries in their effort to identify domestic sources of alternative energy, consistent with economic and material resources, and in compliance with environmental standards within that country. In this way, the U.S. sought to ensure control over all information, technology, and materials relevant to nuclear activities.

The Nuclear Non-proliferation Act amended the Atomic Energy Act of 1946 by establishing new criteria governing U.S. nuclear exports licensed by the NRC. Congress directed the DOE to initiate and plan the design, construction, and operation activities for expansion of uranium enrichment capacity, sufficient for domestic and foreign needs. The act specified that the nuclear non-proliferation controls would not expire annually, eliminating the need for extensions.

=== Uranium Mill Tailings Radiation Control Act of 1978 ===
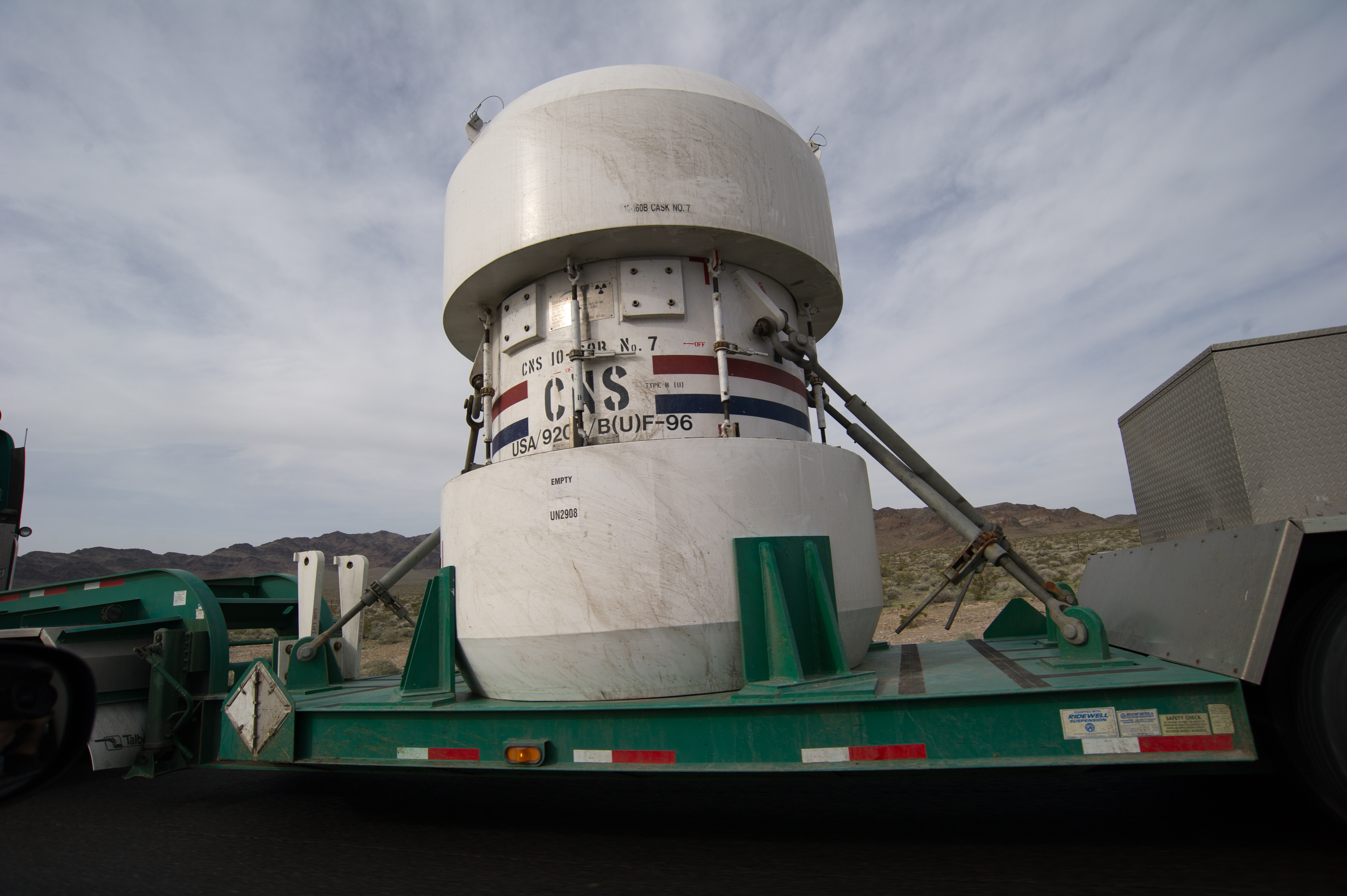
A Nuclear Waste Container coming out of the Department of Energy run Nevada National Security Site on public roads traveling to an unknown final location, March 2010 (Photographer Bill Ebbesen))

The Uranium Mill Tailings Radiation Control Act of 1978 (UMTRCA) was designed to establish programs for the stabilization and control of mill tailings of uranium or thorium mill sites, both active and inactive, in order to prevent or minimize, among other things, the diffusion of radon into the environment. Title II of the act gives the NRC regulatory and licensing authority over mill tailing at sites under NRC license on or after January 1, 1978.

This also gave the DOE the responsibility of stabilizing, disposing, and controlling uranium mill tailings and other contaminated material at twenty-four uranium mill processing sites located across ten states and at approximately 5,200 associated properties.

In the 1950s and 1960s, private firms processed most uranium ore mined in the United States. After uranium mining came under federal control, companies abandoned their mill operations, leaving behind materials with potential long-term health hazards. These mills contained low-level radioactive wastes and other hazardous substances that eventually migrated to the surrounding soil, groundwater, surface water, and emitted radon gas.

Under the Act, the DOE established the Uranium Mill Tailings Remedial Action (UMTRA) Project to monitor the cleanup of uranium mill tailings. The UMTRCA gave the NRC regulatory authority over the cleanup and licensing of mill tailing facilities at sites under NRC license. The EPA had the task of developing cleanup strategies and recording standards for mills. The UMTRA used on-site disposal methods for eleven of the mills, while excavating and disposing of the wastes found at the remaining thirteen sites to remote off-site disposal locations owned by the DOE.

=== Nuclear Waste Policy Act of 1982, as amended ===
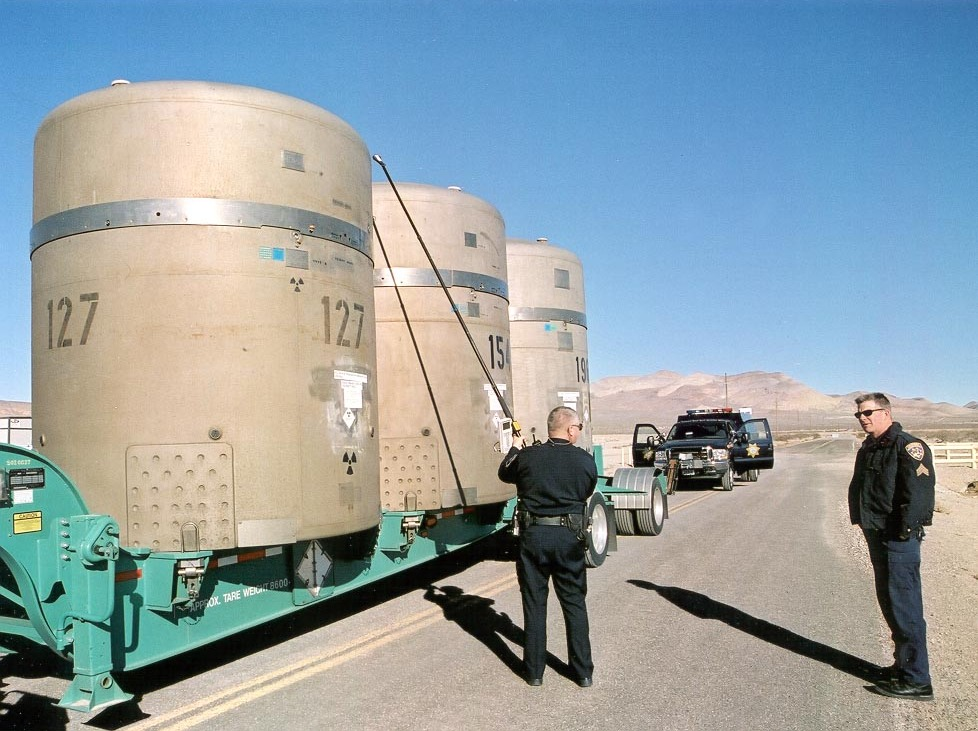
Nevada and California Highway Patrol Officers conduct radiological surveys and mechanical inspections on the first Nevada Test Site transuranic waste shipment at the Area 5 Radioactive Waste Management Complex located on the Nevada Test Site. The shipment is destined for the Waste Isolation Pilot Plant located near Carlsbad, New Mexico on January 4, 2004.

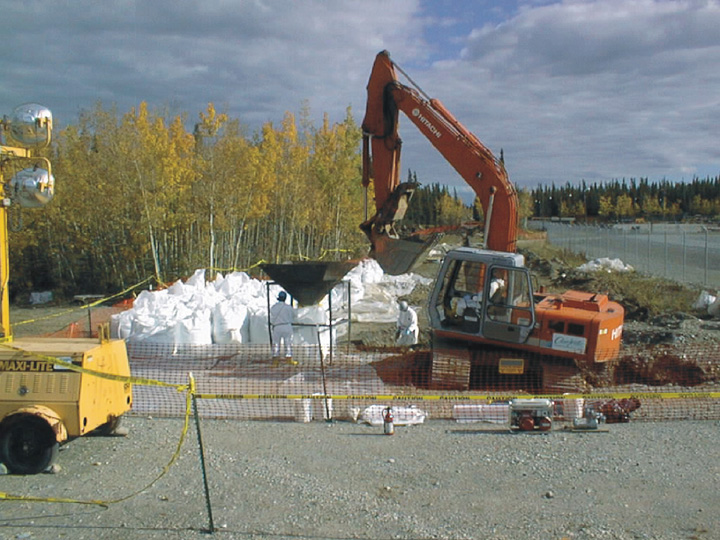
A waste removal project at the former Fort Greely Nuclear Power Plant. Seen here, workers attempted to remove 1500 cubic yards of soil contaminated with extremely low levels of nuclear waste

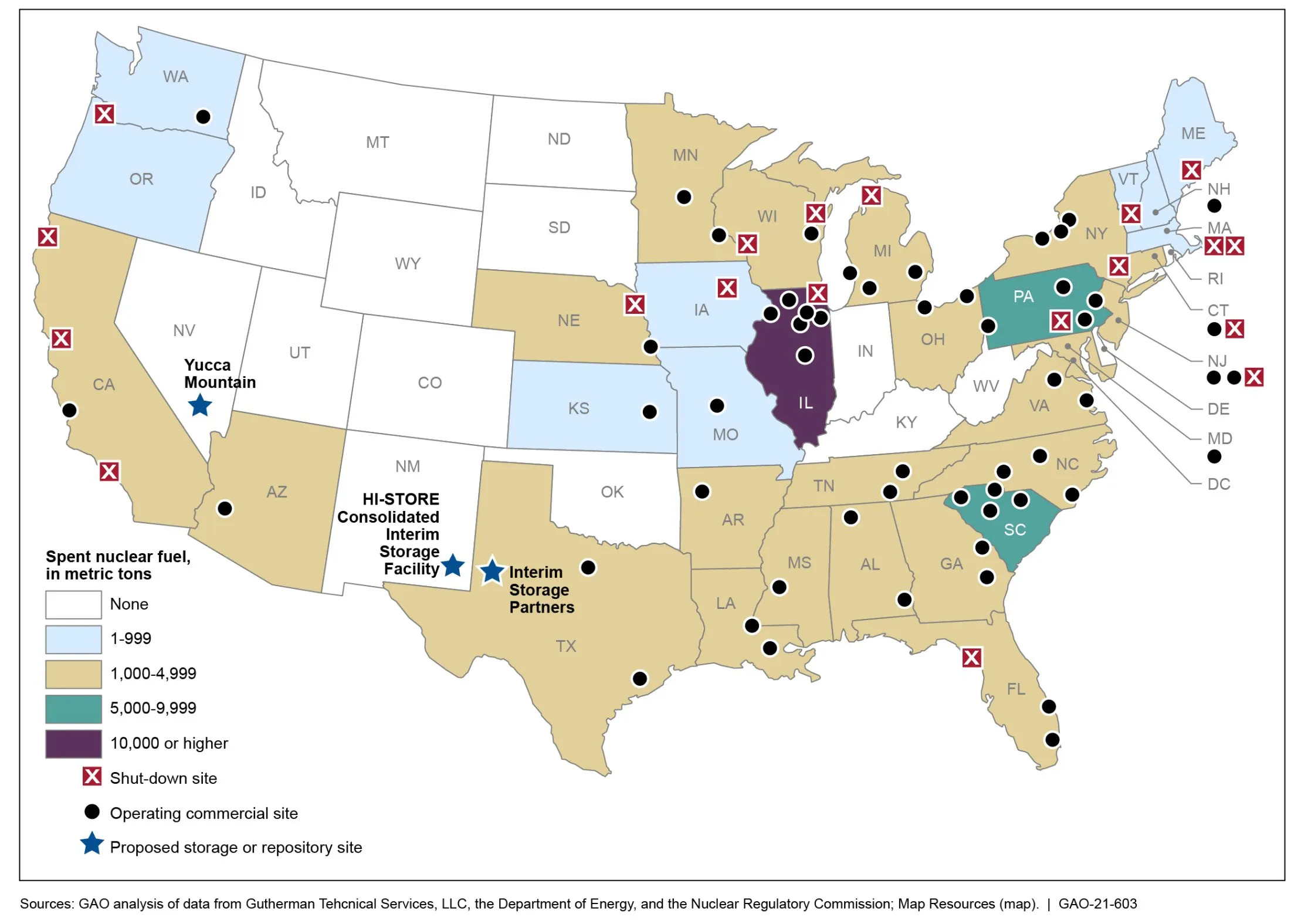
The current locations across the U.S. where nuclear waste is stored

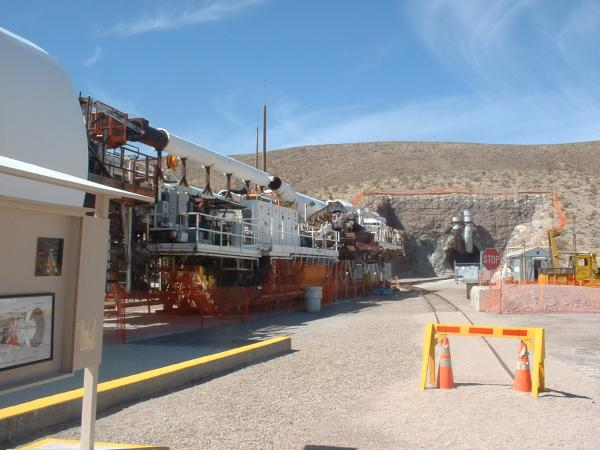
The United States originally planned to store nuclear waste at the south portal of the Yucca Mountain facility.

The Nuclear Waste Policy Act of 1982 established both the federal government's responsibility to provide a place for the permanent disposal of high-level radioactive waste and spent nuclear fuel, and the generators' responsibility to bear the costs of permanent disposal. The Act provides for extensive state, tribal, and public participation in the planning and development of permanent repositories. Amendments to the Act focused the federal government's efforts, through the DOE, on studying a possible site at Yucca Mountain, Nevada, but the project was canceled in 2009. Without a long-term solution to store nuclear waste, a nuclear renaissance in the U.S. remains unlikely. Nine states have "explicit moratoria on new nuclear power until a storage solution emerges".

=== Low-level Radioactive Waste Policy Amendments Act of 1985 ===
The Low-level Radioactive Waste Policy Amendments Act of 1985 gives to states the responsibility to dispose of low-level radioactive waste generated within their borders and allows them to form compacts to locate facilities to serve a group of states. The Act provides that the facilities will be regulated by the NRC or by states that have entered into agreements with the NRC under section 274 of the Atomic Energy Act. The Act also requires the NRC to establish standards for determining when radionuclides are present in waste streams in sufficiently low concentrations or quantities as to be "below regulatory concern."

=== Energy Policy Act of 1992 ===
The Energy Policy Act of 1992 had a provision under Section 801, which directed the EPA to promulgate radiation protection standards for the Yucca Mountain nuclear waste repository in Nevada. The Yucca Mountain site was then designated by the federal government to serve as the permanent disposal site for used nuclear fuel and other radioactive materials from commercial nuclear power plants and U.S. Department of Defense activities. The costs for this project have reached $13.5 billion for this expected 25-year program. However, in 2009, President Barack Obama fulfilled his campaign promise to end the shipping of nuclear waste to the site. Soon after this, the U.S. Senate and the House of Representatives passed legislation to back Obama's decision, although the site is still active and being funded by the government ($196.8 million in the federal budget). Although Obama has asked the NRC to devise another long-term solution to waste storage of spent fuel rods from nuclear reactors, as yet, none have been proposed, and all radioactive waste is still being stored on-site at nuclear power plants.

Currently, there still are a number of remaining concerns as to where the storage of nuclear waste should be stored or even if a central location is required. On May 24, 2011, the Institute for Policy Studies came out with a new report ranking various spent fuel sites and contending that spent nuclear reactor fuel needs to be moved en masse into safer dry cask storage rather than the current liquid pool system. However, Harry Reid brushed aside such remarks with the contention that transport to a central site increases risks. "Leave it on-site where it is," he said last year. "You don't have to worry about transporting it. Saves the country billions and billions of dollars. Currently, Congress nor the NRC or DOE have established a fixed plan for nuclear waste and is still being stored on site at each nuclear facility.

== Nuclear renaissance ==
The nuclear renaissance of nuclear energy in America denotes the time period where political legislation was passed to promote the expansion of nuclear power in the United States. This second age started with the passing of the Energy Policy Act of 2005, which made significant changes in nuclear policy and funding options for nuclear energy. Congress hoped this act would help encourage utility companies to install more reactors and build more nuclear plants to meet the demands of the country's growing energy needs.

=== Energy Policy Act of 2005 ===
On August 8, 2005, President George W. Bush signed the Energy Policy Act of 2005 into law shortly after it passed in the Senate by a 74–26 margin and in the House by a 275–156 margin. Its focus was to provide funding and tax breaks to producers and consumers alike. Although it provided multiple incentives to individual consumers and green energy technology, nuclear energy gained the most concessions. The following are the incentives for nuclear energy:

- Production tax credit of 2.1 ¢/kWh from the first 6,000 MWe of new nuclear capacity in their first eight years of operation.
- Federal risk insurance of $2 billion to cover regulatory delays in full-power operation of the first six advanced new plants.
- Rationalized tax on decommissioning funds.
- Federal loan guarantees for advanced nuclear reactors or other emission-free technologies up to 80% of the project cost.
- Extension for 20 years of the Price–Anderson Act for nuclear liability protection.
- Support for advanced nuclear technology.
- $1.25 billion was authorized for an advanced high-temperature reactor (Next Generation Nuclear Plant) at the Idaho National Laboratory, capable of co-generating hydrogen. Overall, more than $2 billion was provided for hydrogen demonstration projects. Called the Nuclear Power 2010 Program.

In total, over almost $5 billion, as well as extensive tax breaks, were originally designated for nuclear funding, but far more would be put forth to back the loan guarantees. Within the actual legislation, the Secretary of the Interior was charged with carrying out the legislation. In the matter of new funding for next-generation reactors, the Secretary's decision should be in line with the recommendations of the Nuclear Energy Research Advisory Committee in the report entitled "A Roadmap to Deploy New Nuclear Power Plants in the United States by 2010." In other sections, the Secretary was required to work with the Director of Nuclear Energy, Science and Technology in the Department of Energy. This legislation jump-started the nuclear industry again by firmly establishing it as the alternate energy source that politicians wanted. Moreover, it provided financial backing for building, tax incentives, risk insurance, and repealed the Public Utility Holding Company Act of 1935 which allowed utility companies to merge.

Soon after its passage, The Washington Post critically analyzed the legislation and found that the nuclear industry received serious concessions from the government in the Environmental Policy Act of 2005. It wrote:

"The bill's biggest winner was probably the nuclear industry, which received billions of dollars in subsidies and tax breaks covering almost every facet of operations. There were subsidies for research into new reactor designs, "fusion energy," small-particle accelerators and reprocessing nuclear waste, which would reverse current U.S. policy. Rep. Ralph Hall (R-Tex.) even inserted a $250,000 provision for research into using radiation to refine oil...The bill also included $2 billion for "risk insurance" in case new nuclear plants run into construction and licensing delays. And nuclear utilities will be eligible for taxpayer-backed loan guarantees of as much as 80 percent the cost of their plants."

=== Implementation of the Energy Act of 2005 ===
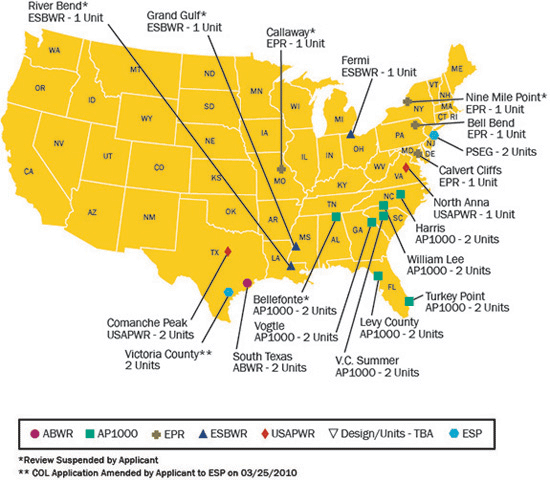
Locations of new reactor cores and nuclear plants

The implementation of funding, loan guarantees, and more advanced research is the sole responsibly of the DOE. In 2008, the DOE began accepting applications from utility companies for the funding of construction promised in the 2005 legislation. Originally, the loan guarantees totaled $18.5 billion for nuclear power plants, and two billion on uranium enriched plants. To provide the funding to nuclear companies, their proposed plants would first need to be approved by the NRC for the initial construction.

Currently, there are 26 known applications from 17 different utility companies (18 Before Duke Power and Progress Energy Merged), 17 of which have been approved or accepted for approval by the NRC. Of these NRC approvals, there are 14 newly proposed nuclear power plants, and 21 new reactor cores to be installed in existing facilities, using five different designs (as of 2011). Furthermore, the DOE also received two applications for uranium enriched power plants.

As of March 21, 2011 The NRC has expected two new applications to be filed in 2012 by two companies, Blue Castle Project in Utah and Callaway County in Missouri. If all the sites come online, 28,800 MWe per year would be added to the power grid. These companies requested loan guarantees totaling far more than the budgeted $18.5 billion. In total, they requested and additional $122 billion, which would bring the overall projected production cost to $188 billion. The uranium enriched power plants only requested a total of $4 billion, which was later accepted by both the NRC and DOE. The provided loan guarantees encourage private lenders to fund these companies.

In essence, the government is promising to protect lenders against 80% of their potential loss, and legitimatizes the investment by first having the DOE review their applications. Moreover, because they are only guarantees, they are not considered government appropriations; no taxpayer dollars are spent unless the loans fall through in a failed investment. Therefore, Congressional approval is thus easier to get.

Because of the enormous costs involved, the nuclear industry requested more loan guarantees from the government, totaling $100 billion. In February 2010, President Obama, who ran on a pro-nuclear platform, negotiated with the companies and added $36 billion to the budgeted $18.5 billion, bringing the total of $54.5 billion to the Presidential 2011 Budget for the DOE loans. The DOE also sought another $9 billion though other legislation for the utility companies, Southern Company and Oglethorpe Power for Plant Vogtle in Georgia, as well as three other plants for the installation of five proposed reactor cores.

On April 19, 2011, The New York Times reported that NRG Energy has ended construction of the two largest proposed nuclear plants in South Texas. NRG claims that they will write off the $331 million investment as a loss and according to David Crane NRG's CEO, that unless the situation changes, the chance of continuing is “extremely daunting and at this point not particularly likely.”. Even though "The plan was for the South Texas Project 3 and 4 reactors, and was identified more than two years ago by the Energy Department as one of the four candidates for loan guarantees that were authorized by the 2005 Energy Act,"

NRG notes that there is a surplus in Texas of Natural Gas utilities and the nuclear incident in Japan has led to further funding problems for the facilities. Although NRG still plans on paying the full licensing costs to the NRC for the two proposed facilities, Crane told to the Dallas news that even if the project is resurrected, “it will have to be fueled by somebody else's financial resources.” The halting of construction of these reactors marks the "second of the four to die; Calvert Cliffs 3, in Maryland, seems unlikely at this point, because Constellation Energy could not reach financial terms with the Energy Department. The department has granted a conditional loan guarantee to one project in Georgia and may give another to a project in South Carolina."

=== Nuclear Energy Innovation Capabilities Act of 2017 ===
The Nuclear Energy Innovation Capabilities Act of 2017 was signed into law on September 28, 2018. This bill amended the Energy Policy Act of 2005 to cut regulatory costs as well as help expand nuclear energy scientific progress and research from academia, national laboratories, and the private/civilian sector. The bill also directs the DOE to develop a fast test reactor for neutron sources for advanced reactors fuels and materials that did not exist in the US previously.

=== Infrastructure Investment and Jobs Act of 2021 ===
The Infrastructure Investment and Jobs Act of 2021, also known as the Bipartisan Infrastructure Law, which was passed in 2021, provides new federal incentives for nuclear energy. The legislation allocates $6 billion to the U.S. Department of Energy to subsidize nuclear plants that are economically threatened by early closure due to flawed markets. The law also appropriates $2.4 billion in key funding for microreactors, small modular reactors, and other advanced nuclear reactors, and enables an additional $3.2 billion through 2027. In particular, through the Civil Nuclear Credit Program established under the law, operators and owners of nuclear reactors may apply for certification to bid on loans to finance the operation of nuclear plants. Applicants must demonstrate that a nuclear reactor is scheduled to shut down for economic reasons in order to qualify for credits under the program.

=== Inflation Reduction Act of 2022 ===
The Inflation Reduction Act includes a number of important provisions that support a wide range of recent and ongoing nuclear industry activities. In addition to granting new production tax credits for existing nuclear plants (which will strengthen the financial argument for renewed licenses and continued operation of those facilities), the legislation provides multiple credits aimed at low- or zero-carbon energy sources, including nuclear. These include credits centered on the creation of clean electricity (such as future new-build nuclear power initiatives), clean hydrogen (which can be produced by nuclear reactors), and investments in clean energy (including certain nuclear facilities).

Advanced nuclear reactors also benefit from the legislation thanks to the Clean Electricity Production Tax Credit, a technology-agnostic production credit that can be applied to emissions-free electricity production that comes online after 2025. Through 2026, the bill allocates $700 million for high-assay low enrichment uranium (HALEU) fuel source research and development in the United States. This is important since HALEU fuel is necessary to operate the advanced, next-generation nuclear reactors that american companies are now developing. Additionally, the IRA includes $150 million for the Office of Nuclear Energy to be invested in its network of National Laboratories for nuclear innovation research until 2027.

=== ADVANCE Act of 2024 ===
In 2024, with overwhelming majorities Congress passed S. 870, containing the ADVANCE Act, which directs the Nuclear Regulatory Commission to improve its assessments of new nuclear technology and fuels, cuts regulatory approval costs for advanced reactor designs, creates a grant prize competition for deployment of Generation IV reactors, and streamlines Energy Department export controls for nuclear technology.

== State response to nuclear expansion legislation ==
Many states have supported utility companies' installation of nuclear plants, but some states have not. Although the federal government has the foremost control over nuclear energy regulations, safety and funding, each state government has some say about whether or not to implement nuclear energy in their state. In 1976, California passed legislation which prevented new nuclear power plants from being built until an approved means of disposing of fuel-rod waste was approved. This legislation, which was also renewed in 2005, effectively put a moratorium on nuclear power plants in California, since no fuel-rod waste measure was ever approved. Soon afterwards, other states passed similar laws limiting nuclear energy influence in their state. This California legislation was reaffirmed by the U.S. Supreme Court in 1983 when it ruled that, "It did not conflict with federal authority because it addressed legitimate state issues of economic and electricity reliability concerns, and not safety." Moreover, individual states also are allowed to have a public service commission that regulates electricity sales to consumers, and can either grant or deny any federal funds or loans appropriated for nuclear companies' construction in the state. They also have veto power over where nuclear waste is stored (unless overridden by Congress), such as in the case of the Yucca Mountain Waste Storage Facility. Finally, states are allowed to levy taxes on nuclear companies, which grants them power to prevent facilities from operating or encouraging new growth through tax breaks.

== Construction plans and cancellations ==
Many license applications filed with the Nuclear Regulatory Commission for proposed new reactors have been suspended or cancelled. As of October 2011, plans for about 30 new reactors in the United States have been "whittled down to just four, despite the promise of large subsidies and President Barack Obama’s support of nuclear power, which he reaffirmed after Fukushima". A reactor currently under construction in America, is at Watts Bar, Tennessee, was begun in 1973 and may be completed in 2012. Matthew Wald from The New York Times has reported that "the nuclear renaissance is looking small and slow".

Generation III reactors are safer than older reactors like the GE MAC 1 at Fukushima, Vermont Yankee and other plants around the world. But after a decade in which the federal government did all it could to boost this new version of nuclear power, only one Generation III+ reactor project has been approved in the United States. Work on it has just begun in Georgia, and already "there are conflicts between the utility, Southern Company and the Nuclear Regulatory Commission". Moreover, this project is going forward only because it is in one of the few regions of the United States (the Southeast) where electricity markets were not deregulated. That means "the utility, operating on cost-plus basis, can pass on to rate-payers all its expense over-runs".

In 2008, the Energy Information Administration projected almost 17 gigawatts of new nuclear power reactors by 2030, but in its 2011 projections, it "scaled back the 2030 projection to just five". Following the Fukushima Daiichi nuclear disaster, public support for building nuclear power plants in the U.S. dropped to 43%, slightly lower than it was immediately after the Three Mile Island accident in 1979, according to a CBS News poll. A survey conducted in April 2011 found that 64 percent of Americans opposed the construction of new nuclear reactors. A survey sponsored by the Nuclear Energy Institute, conducted in September 2011, found that "62 percent of respondents said they favor the use of nuclear energy as one of the ways to provide electricity in the United States, with 35 percent opposed".

As of December 2011, construction by Southern Company on two new nuclear units has begun, and they are expected to be delivering commercial power by 2016 and 2017. But, looking ahead, experts see continuing challenges that will make it difficult for the nuclear power industry to expand beyond a small handful of reactor projects that "government agencies decide to subsidize by forcing taxpayers to assume the risk for the reactors and mandating that ratepayers pay for construction in advance". On February 9, 2012, according to a Southern Company press release, the NRC voted and approved for the full issuance of the Combined Construction and Operating License for Plant Vogtle units 3 and 4. These two units, if completed, would be the first two new reactors to be built in American in almost 30 years. According to Southern Company, they plan on utilizing $1 billion in benefits from the Department of Energy loan guarantees, production tax credits and recovering financing costs during construction. If construction proceeds on schedule, Georgia Power expects Unit 3 to begin operating in 2016 and Unit 4 in 2017.

== Closure of existing nuclear power plants ==
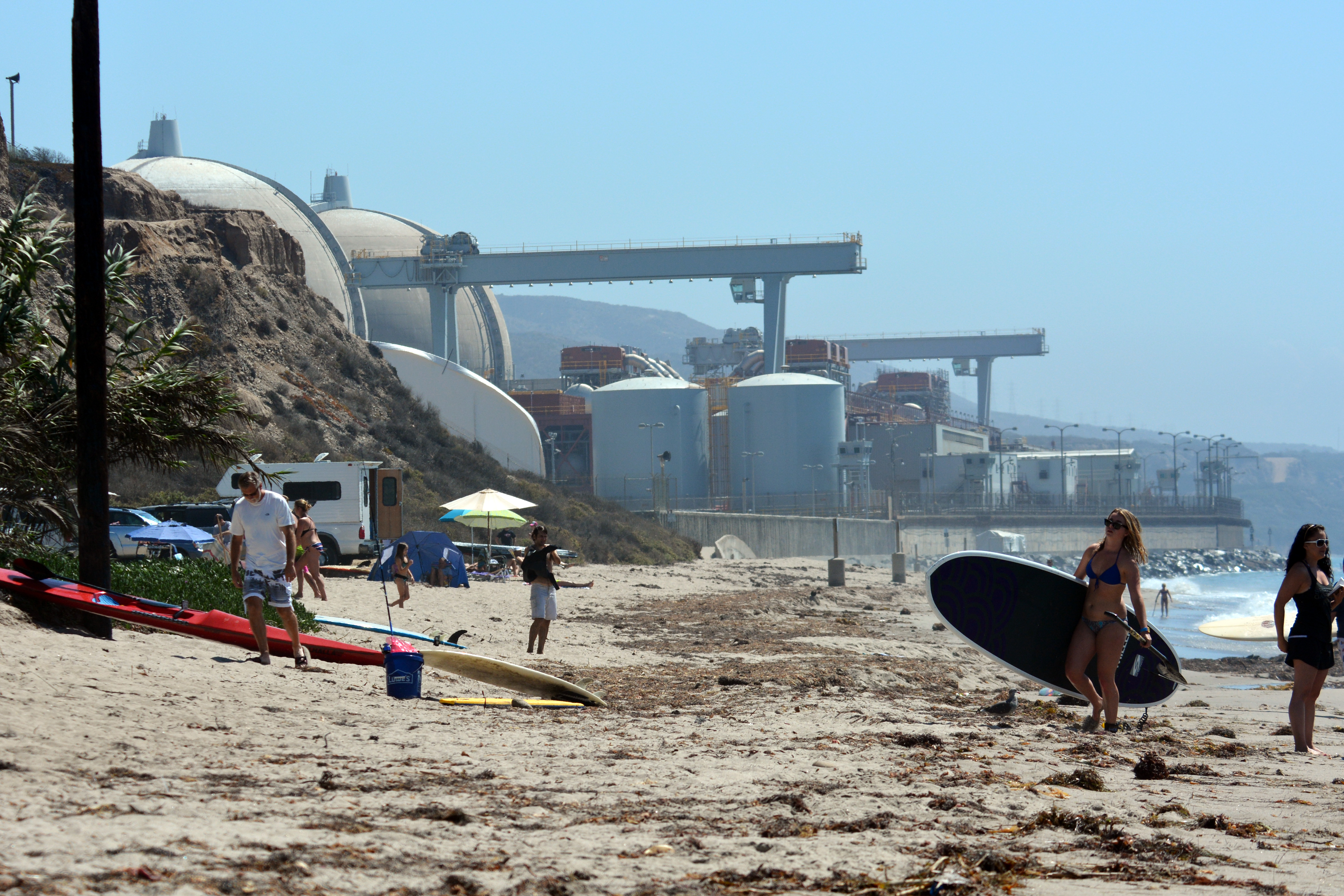
More than 1,700 tons of radioactive waste are stored at San Onofre.

A number of factors have led to increased pressure on the economic viability of the current fleet of nuclear power plants. The age of the existing 104 nuclear power plants means that the licenses of most need to be extended. Most of the nation's first wave of nuclear power plants came on-line between 1956 and the Energy Reorganization Act of 1974. Typically, they received forty-year licenses, which means most plants' licenses were set to expire between approximately 1996–2014. However, a number of these plants were extended by twenty years and often received power up-grades, which allowed them to run at 120% their originally intended capacity.

While new plants are subject to stricter standards, these older plants often do not have to adhere to them. Considering the expensive modifications necessary (sometimes in the billions of dollars) to make a number of these older nuclear plants adhere to current safety standards, some believe that these older nuclear power plants open may not be financially viable when compared to sustainable energy alternatives, such as wind and solar energy.

Additionally, an AP investigation published on June 27, 2011, found that older nuclear power plants were also often built in areas that at the time the plants were built were located outside of urban areas but are now in close proximity to metropolitan cities and their suburban sprawl. The twin dangers of increased proximity and decrepit plants has raised alarm bells for concerned area residents.

== Public response to nuclear accidents ==
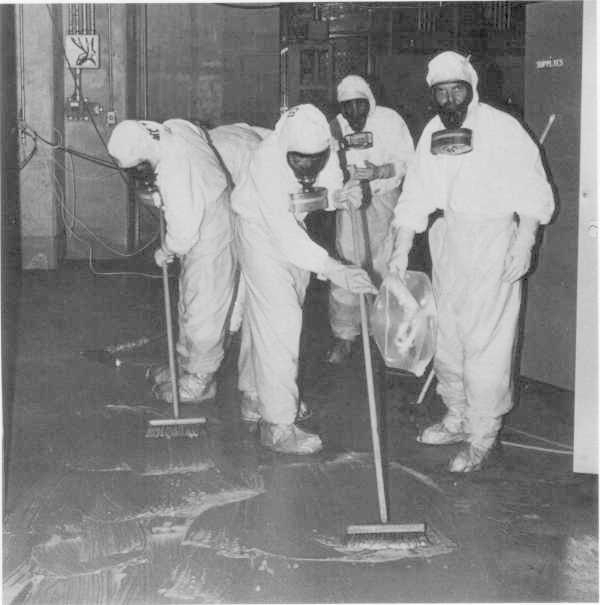
A clean-up crew working to remove radiation at Three Mile Island Nuclear Generating Station

Over the years, public opinion about the nuclear industry, both in the United States and worldwide, soured significantly after several nuclear-related incidents. According to Benjamin K. Sovacool, writer and professor at Singapore's Lee Kuan Yew School of Public Policy and a leading environmental researcher in nuclear energy policy, in the United States alone, there were over 52 different incidents from 1959 to 2010, ranging from leaks, cooling rod malfunctions, explosions, cracks in the core, electrocutions, core overheating and other issues. These incidents led to the deaths of seven individuals and to costs estimated at $8.56 billion (inflation adjusted to 2006).

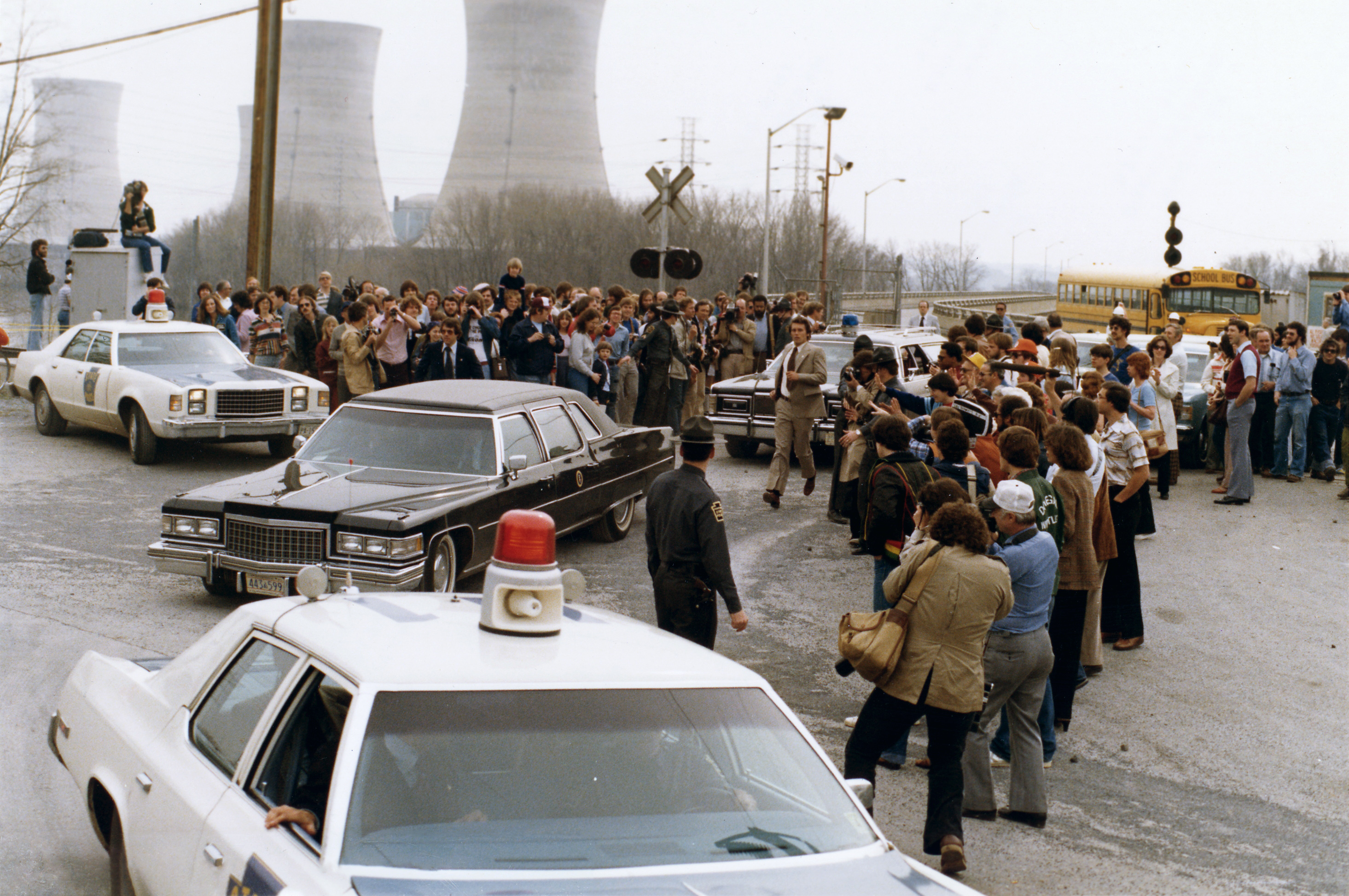
President Jimmy Carter leaving Three Mile Island, shortly after the accident

=== 1979 Three Mile Island accident ===
One of the largest accidents was the Three Mile Island incident in Middleton, Pennsylvania in 1979. Believed today to have been caused mostly by human error, a partial-meltdown occurred when a valve was left open, letting out substantial amounts of reactor coolant.

Governor Dick Thornburgh, on the advice of NRC Chairman Joseph Hendrie, advised the evacuation "of pregnant women and pre-school age children...within a five-mile radius of the Three Mile Island facility." The evacuation zone was extended to a 20-mile radius on Friday March 30. Within days, 140,000 people had left the area. More than half of the 663,500 population within the 20 mile radius remained in that area. According to a survey conducted in April 1979, 98% of the evacuees had returned to their homes within 3 weeks.

Although some debate remains, "several health studies found there were no long-term adverse effects on the health of the population living around Three Mile Island." "Even though there was a release of radiation, the radiation dose to people living within 10 miles of the plant was eight millirem, and no more than 100 millirem to any single individual. Eight millirem is about equal to a chest X-ray, and 100 millirem is about a third of the average background radiation received by U.S. residents in a year.

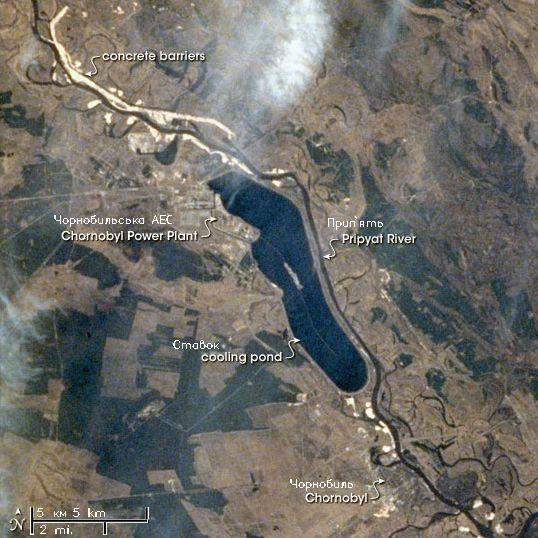
Aerial photo of Chernobyl, taken from the Russian space station, Mir

=== 1986 Chernobyl disaster ===
The 1986 disaster in Chernobyl, USSR is generally considered to be the worst nuclear disaster, to date. In the early hours of 26 April 1986, the crew at Chernobyl conducted a test of a safety feature. They turned off power to the water pumps which circulated coolant through the reactor. They wanted to determine how long the turbines would continue to spin and power the pumps (to continue cooling the reactor) even after the power to the pumps had been cut. However, before the test, xenon had accumulated in the fuel rods, reducing power. Xenon is a "reactor poison," which absorbs neutrons and slows down fission chain reactions. Operators tried to increase power for the purpose of the test by withdrawing the control rods. Control rods also absorb neutrons, so withdrawing them increases power (heat) output. Water then started forming steam bubbles in the reactor. Steam absorbs fewer neutrons than the same volume of water, so this caused the heat output to increase further. When the operators then tried to reduce heat output by reinserting the control rods, heat output increased (contrary to the operator's expectations). This happened because of a design flaw in the controls rods; the control rods were tipped with graphite, a "moderator" which slows neutrons, increasing their ability to fission uranium. So inserting the graphite ends of the control rods into the core increased power output (and reactor temperature) when it needed to be reduced. The first explosion then occurred; it was a steam explosion caused by water in the core becoming high-temperature, high-pressure steam. The second explosion, less than a minute later, was probably a hydrogen gas explosion. Explosive hydrogen gas can form when high-temperature steam reacts with zirconium (in the cladding of the uranium fuel rods).

Chernobyl radiation map from the 1996 CIA Handbook

According to World-Nuclear.org, "Two workers died as a result of the explosions. The graphite (of which, about a quarter of the 1200 tons was estimated to have been ejected) and fuel became incandescent and started a number of fires, causing the main release of radioactivity into the environment. A total of about 14 EBq (14 x 1018 Bq) of radioactivity was released, over half of it being from biologically-inert noble gases."

Following the explosion, hundreds of tons of water per hour were poured into the reactor to douse the fires which were releasing radioactive smoke. However, this was quickly abandoned after half a day, to prevent water from flooding units 1 and 2. For the next eight days, "Some 5000 tons of boron, dolomite, sand, clay and lead were dropped by helicopter onto the burning core in an effort to extinguish the blaze and limit the release of radioactive particles."

Aside from the two initial deaths, officially, 28 more died in the following weeks. Soon after, 336,000 people were evacuated after the explosion and fire. Eradiated ash, dust, and smoke traveled across much of Europe including Russia, Ukraine, and Belarus. There is a heated debate over the official number of deaths, illnesses and subsequent birth defects caused by the plant's meltdown. The estimated number of deaths potentially resulting from the accident vary enormously; the World Health Organization (WHO) suggested it could reach 4,000 while a Greenpeace report puts this figure at 200,000 or more. According to WHO, by mid-2005, only about 50 deaths could be directly associated with the disaster.

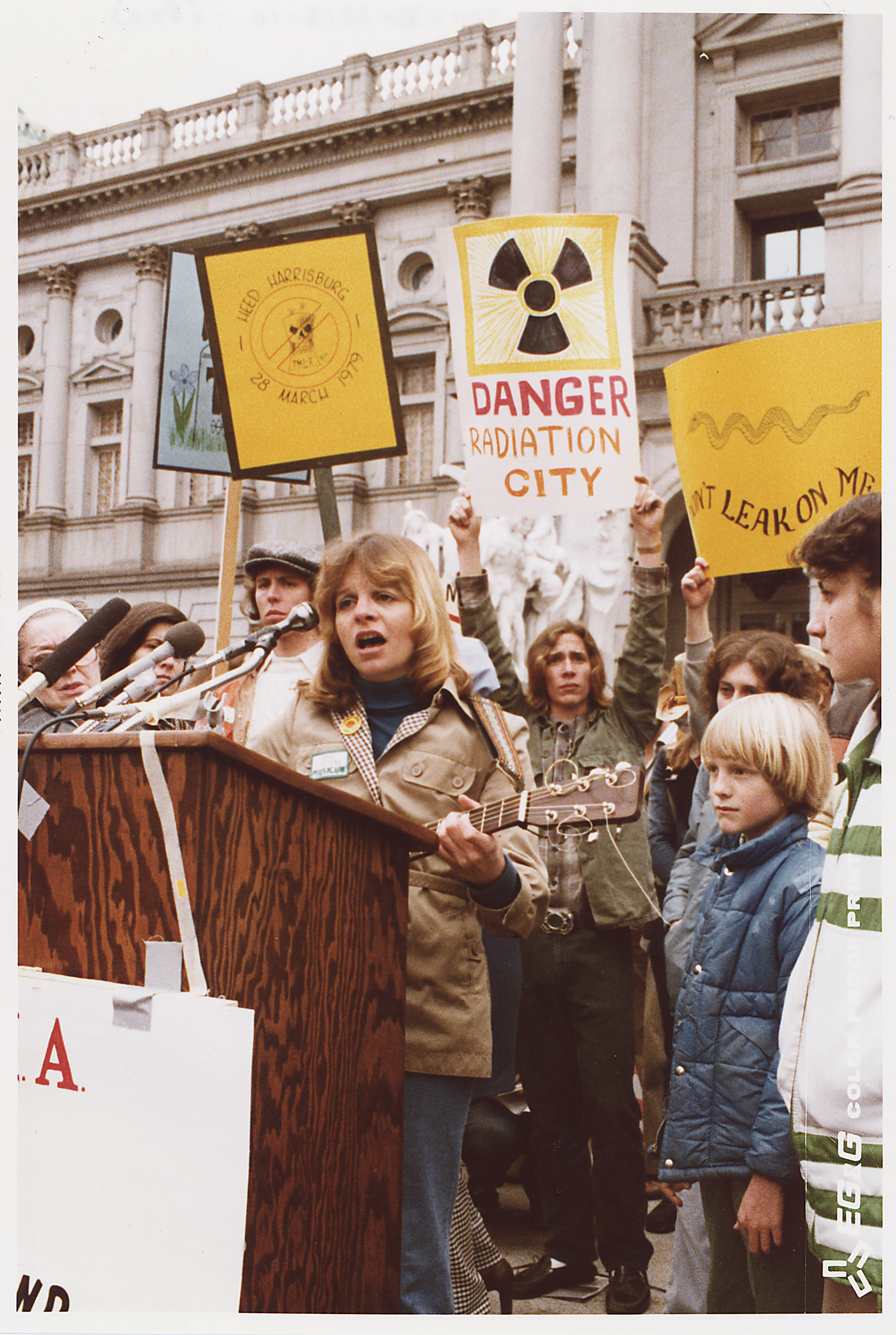
A 1979 anti-nuclear protest in Harrisburg, Pennsylvania after the Three Mile Island incident

=== Public opinion after Chernobyl ===
As the west began to learn about the Chernobyl incident, fear and anxiety about nuclear energy swelled in U.S. public opinion. Even as early as 1975, anti-nuclear movement coalitions were making strides in reducing the power of the nuclear industry. The coalitions were able to instill fear in the population over the multiple errors in the daily operations of nuclear energy plants, causing them to be constantly shut down, and exposing the ineffectiveness in their energy production. By this point, in the late 1980s, most U.S. plants were either at or close to completion, so the Chernobyl incident did not prevent plants from coming online. However, after 1986, anti-nuclear messages were reinforced by media pictures of deformed babies and other atrocities from the fallout in the Soviet Union after Chernobyl. Citizen pressure forced the NRC to address multiple issues alarming the public, resulting in "improved reactor safety, reporting abnormal occurrences at power plants, revised radiation standards, protecting nuclear plants from sabotage, safeguarding nuclear materials from theft, licensing the export of nuclear equipment and fuel, authorizing steps to use plutonium as fuel for nuclear power, and other matters." Shortly after the 1979 Three Mile Island incident, a poll by The New York Times and CBS found that public approval for building new nuclear plants dropped from 69% to 49% and opposition increased from 21% to 41%. Similarly, after the Chernobyl incident, a CBS news poll showed that 55% of those questioned believed a similar meltdown was likely to happen in the U.S.

After Chernobyl, with popular fear and distrust of nuclear power, and most energy companies preferring coal-fired plants, the U.S. nuclear industry went dormant for a number of years, although legislation continued until 1992. Although nuclear plants were still quite active and even improving production and safety practices, construction of new plants ended in the late 1980s. This was acceptable to a number of utility companies, because most of the plants were licensed to operate on 20–40 year contracts, despite an unfavorable political climate. Over time, multiple polls showed a steady increase in public support and decrease in opposition, except for a temporary drop in numbers after the September 11 attacks and the Iraq and Afghanistan wars. According to a Gallup poll in 2009, 59% of the public favored the use of nuclear energy, including 27% who strongly favored it, an increase from 49% since 2001. Moreover, in 2009, the Gallup poll showed 56% people believed nuclear energy was safe versus 42% who believed it was unsafe. Other polls showed an even larger gap; Bloomberg and The Los Angeles Times found that 61% supported nuclear energy, while 30% opposed in 2010. Bisconti Research Inc./Gfk Roper, market researchers commissioned by the Nuclear Energy Institute, a nuclear industry lobbying group, found that "A record-high 74 percent of Americans surveyed in a new national poll support nuclear energy and a similar majority of 70 percent says the United States should 'definitely build more' nuclear energy facilities [in 2010]." According to Ann Bisconti, PhD, "This unprecedented support for nuclear energy is being driven largely by people's concerns for meeting future energy demand and environmental goals, but it coincides with statements by President Obama and other national leaders who have voiced strong support for more nuclear power plants."

=== 2011 Fukushima accidents and public policy impact ===
What had been growing acceptance of nuclear power in the United States was eroded sharply following the 2011 Japanese nuclear accidents, with public support for building nuclear power plants in the U.S. dropping slightly lower than it was immediately after the Three Mile Island accident in 1979. Support had been at an all-time high of 69 percent in 1977, according to polling by the New York Times and CBS News. 43 percent of those polled after the Fukushima nuclear emergency said they would approve building new power plants in the United States. This represents a decline from a high of 57 percent in July 2008.

Activists who were involved in the U.S. anti-nuclear movement's emergence (such as Graham Nash and Paul Gunter) suggest that Japan's nuclear crisis may rekindle an interest in the movement in the United States. The aim, they say, is "not just to block the Obama administration’s push for new nuclear construction, but to convince Americans that existing plants pose dangers".

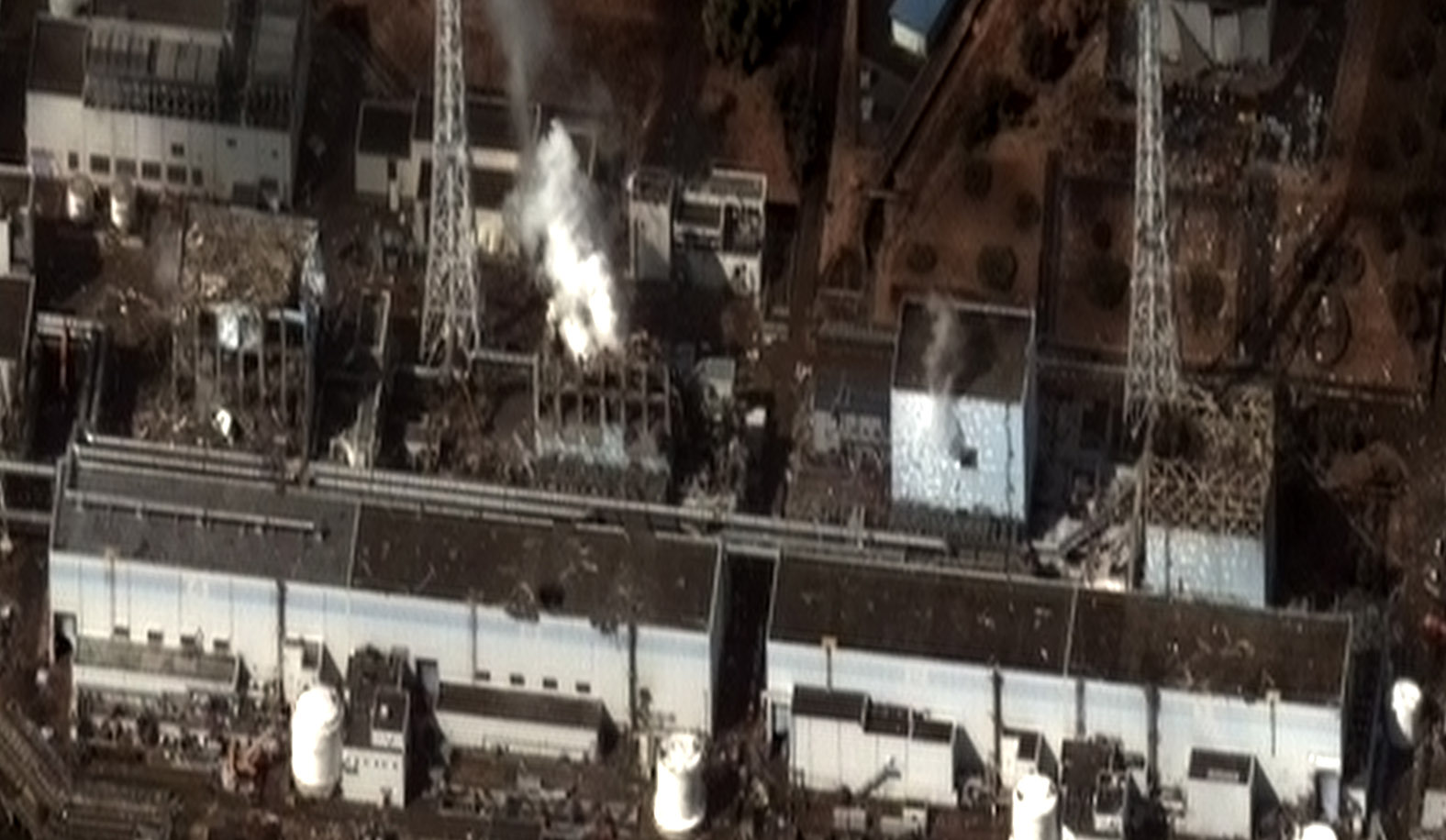
March 2011 satellite photo of the damaged reactors at the Fukushima facilities after the earthquake and tsunami.

Public opinion appears to have been aroused with regard to the re-licensing application of the Diablo Canyon Power Plant. Nuclear Regulatory Commission officials had already planned to conduct a series of public meetings in January, February and March 2011 as public attention in San Luis Obispo County turned towards the question of whether the plant should be re-licensed subsequent to public disclosure of a third major fault close to the plant. Protest leaders contend that there is no safe way to store spent reactor fuel, but other community leaders such as the mayor of a nearby town dispute that contention. In a review of current trends, state Sen. Sam Blakeslee (R-San Luis Obispo), who holds a doctorate in geophysics, was quoted as stating:

"The fundamental question is whether these facilities should be located next to active faults and whether they are operated safely", said. "With what's unfolding in Japan, why would anyone approve a permit for these plants to keep operating until every question is answered?"

In March 2011, 600 people gathered for a weekend protest outside the Vermont Yankee nuclear plant. The demonstration was held to show support for the thousands of Japanese people who are endangered by possible radiation from the Fukushima I nuclear accidents.

The New England region has a long history of anti-nuclear activism and 75 people held a State House rally on April 6, 2011, to "protest the region’s aging nuclear plants and the increasing stockpile of radioactive spent fuel rods at them". The protest was held shortly before a State House hearing where legislators were scheduled to hear representatives of the region's three nuclear plants—Pilgrim in Plymouth, Vermont Yankee in Vernon, and Seabrook in New Hampshire—talk about the safety of their reactors in the light of the Japanese nuclear crisis. Vermont Yankee and Pilgrim have designs similar to the crippled Japanese nuclear plant.

Calculated cesium-137 concentration in the air, 24 March 2011

It was the anniversary of the US Three Mile Island nuclear incident which was the occasion of a substantial rally in South Korea in March 2011. South Korean environmental activists staged an anti-nuclear rally on Monday, marking the 32nd anniversary of the Three Mile Island nuclear power plant accident in the United States. In Pennsylvania, "dozens" reportedly turned out for the 32nd anniversary of the Three Mile Island event. In contrast to the apparently reinvigorated protests in Europe, California and New England, the dozens of protesters gathering at the gates of the TMI plant received and in the coverage received, organizers referred only obliquely to the Fukushima incident. "Plants age, we knew that [industry] profit motives rather than safety motives meant there was going to be another accident”, said Gene Stilp, the organizer of the Three Mile Island protest and No Nukes Pennsylvania member, to the German Press Agency DPA. He urged the United States to discontinue producing nuclear energy, expressing doubt in U.S. nuclear power plants’ preparedness for unforeseen natural disasters. "You can't control mother nature," he reasoned."

The article continued to quote the U.S. Nuclear Energy Foundation to the effect that too much stock is being put into the fear surrounding Fukushima power plant. On a policy level, United States officials were wary. U.S. Energy Secretary Steven Chu told Congress that the Obama administration intends to hold the course on underwriting new nuclear power plants. "The people in the United States, U.S. territories, are in no danger”, Chu said during a Fox News Sunday broadcast. "It's unlikely they will be exposed to danger." As the ARPA-E Energy Innovation Summit 2011 Keynote Presentation, he skirted the nuclear issue and argued for a "longer term more measured approach". He emphasized lithium-ion batteries, high-speed rail, computerized design for streamlining long-haul trucks, carbon capture and other technologies, emphasizing that Europe and China may be surpassing the US in clean energy and roboticized manufacturing. The power point presentation, and a video of the presentation, are available online. The US is in the lead of venture capital financing, technology adaptation and deployment but in a number of areas is neck and neck with China. A number of his comments seem broadly applicable to nuclear policy, such as that "just because we've lost a lead doesn't mean we can't recover it." ARPA-E is Advanced Research Projects Agency-Energy, a relatively new United States government agency set up to promote and fund research and development.

Nevertheless, the nuclear disaster in Japan is likely to have major effects on US energy policy, according to billionaire investor Warren Buffett. Speaking on CNBC in March, Buffet said that the "United States was poised to move ahead with nuclear plans here, but the events in Japan derailed that". "Radiation terrifies people", Buffett told CNBC. "It's unseen, there's no way to quantify sort of the limits of what might happen from it so I would say that I would be very surprised if there's any nuclear facilities built in the United States for a long time." Moreover, Japan's government and TEPCO response to the Fukushima Daiichi incident has been criticized worldwide, and Gregory B. Jaczko, Chairman of the US Nuclear Regulatory Commission, broke with ordinary protocols by overruling the Japanese with regard to the public exclusion zone. As a result of the harshly criticized Japanese handling of the crisis, there has been a scramble by the EU to reform nuclear policy. Some commentators expect that US will have a greater influence on nuclear policy worldwide.

== See also ==
- Regulatory capture (see in relation to the Nuclear Regulatory Commission)
- Nuclear Engineering Student Delegation
- Nuclear weapons and the United States – (see in relation to the Executive Branch – Military & DoD actions relating to Nuclear Weapons)
