= Derouet =

Derouet is a surname. Notable people with the surname include:

- Edgard Derouet (1910–2001), French painter
- Henri-Fr.-M.-P. Derouet (1922–2004), French bishop
- Valérie Derouet (born 1965), French engineer
