= Atomic Industrial Forum =

The Atomic Industrial Forum (AIF) was an industrial policy organization for the commercial development of nuclear power and energy.

== History ==
=== 1950s ===
The Atomic Industrial Forum history dates to Autumn 1952, when it was being first organized:

I would propose that those industrial concerns, institutions and individuals that are today actively engaged in atomic energy research, development and operations form—voluntarily and without governmental urging or subsidy—a national association of atomic industries.

— T. Keith Glennan, President of the Case Institute of Technology and founding member, AIF Board of Directors, November 1952

In response, some 30 industrialists, engineers, and educators met in January 1953 to establish the forum. The AIF was formally incorporated on April 10, 1953, in New York City, and marked the beginning of the commercial nuclear power industry in the United StatesThe first Executive Director of AIF was Charles Robbins.

As a profit trade association the AIF advocated the peaceful uses of atomic energy and increasing the role of the private sector in its development. Its first order of business was to advocate revising the Atomic Energy Act of 1946 to allow and foster the commercial ownership of non weapons nuclear facilities, such as production of radioactive isotopes and nuclear power plants. AIF established strong working relationships with the U.S. Atomic Energy Commission and the Congressional Joint Committee on Atomic Energy. AIF's efforts helped to achieve the passage of the Atomic Energy Act of 1954 which resulted in the growth of a commercial nuclear industry. AIF was organized on the basis of an executive committee, the annual election of officers and a permanent operations staff, headed by an Executive Director, Mr. Charles Robbins.

=== 1960s ===
In 1963 AIF established an international public information program. Working with other forums around the world, the program sought, through publications, workshops, exhibitions, speeches and outreach, to foster and achieve better understanding of the peaceful uses of atomic energy. Its first program director was Charles B.Yulish.

Both the government and private sectors involvement in atomic energy grew steadily; eventually, more that 125 commercial nuclear power plants provided 20 percent of America's electricity. At the same time there were increasing debates on safeguards and regulation. The Atomic Energy Commission, which both promoted, developed and regulated nuclear development, was split into two agencies—the Energy Research and Development Agency, now the Department of Energy, and the independent U.S. Nuclear Regulatory Administration.

As new challenges and opportunities evolved, new industry efforts and resources were required to address these matters.

=== 1980s ===
In 1987 the AIF was reconfigured into the Nuclear Utility Management and Resources Council (NUMARC), which addressed generic regulatory and technical issues, and the U.S. Council for Energy Awareness (USCEA), founded in 1979. In 1994 these two organizations were again reorganized and re-purposed. The Nuclear Energy Institute and the American Nuclear Energy Council (ANEC conducted public affairs, and the nuclear division of the Edison Electric Institute (EEI), was responsible for issues involving nuclear fuel supply and management, and the economics of nuclear energy.

=== 2000s ===
In 2011, the Nuclear Energy Institute became the leading organization representing the nuclear industry. NEI headquarters is in Washington, DC.
