= Frank Bowman =

United States admiral (born 1944)

Frank L. Bowman
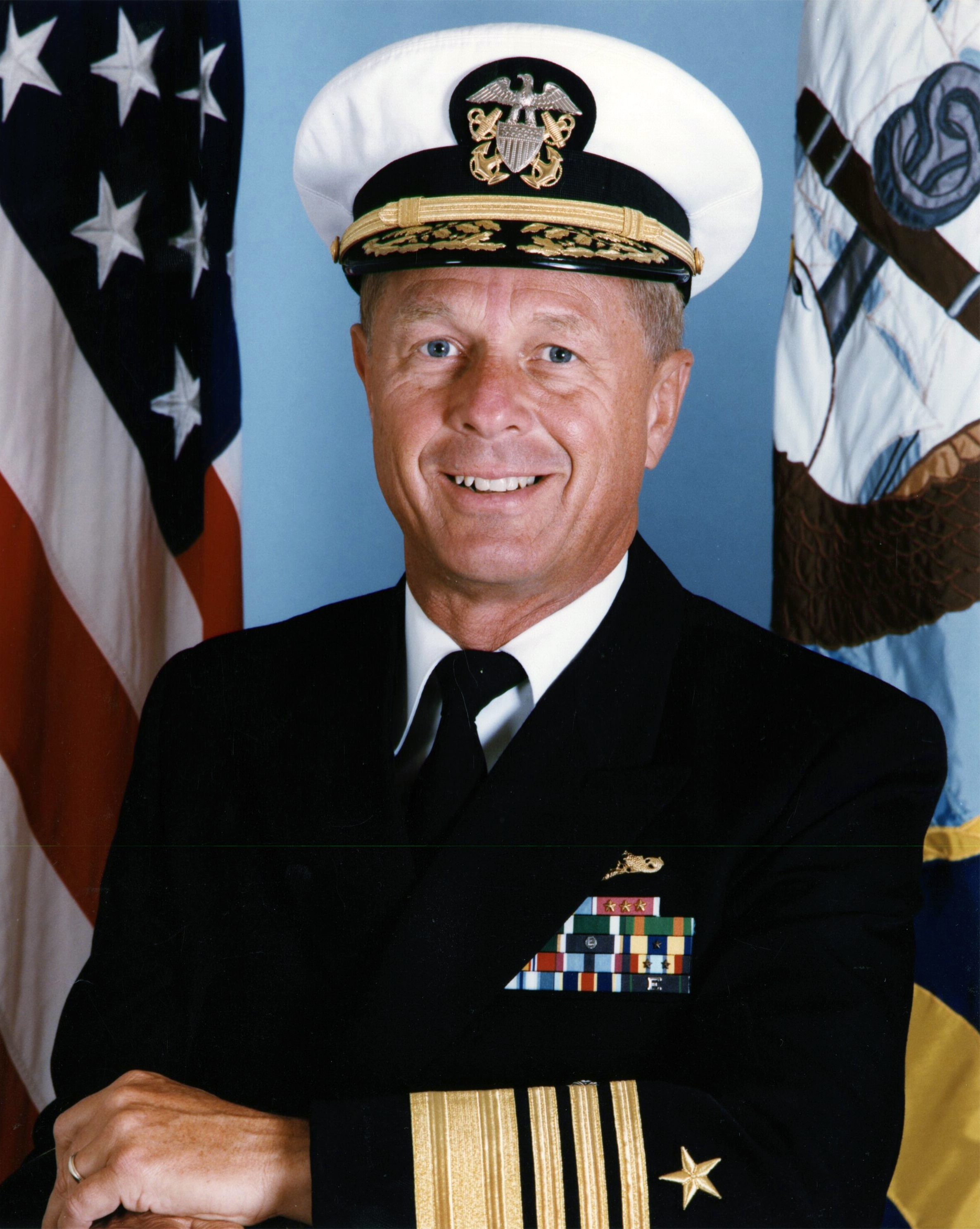
- Born: December 19, 1944 (age 81); Chattanooga, Tennessee, U.S.
- Military career
- Allegiance: United States of America
- Branch: United States Navy
- Service years: 1966–2004
- Rank: Admiral
- Nickname: Skip
- Commands: Chief of Naval Personnel; Director of Naval Nuclear Propulsion; USS City of Corpus Christi; USS Holland
- Awards: Defense Distinguished Service Medal; Navy Distinguished Service Medal; Legion of Merit (4); Knight Commander of the Order of the British Empire (United Kingdom); Officer of the National Order of Merit (France)
- Other work: CEO, Nuclear Energy Institute

Frank Lee Bowman (born 19 December 1944), a retired four-star Admiral, is the former Chief of Naval Personnel and former Director of Naval Nuclear Propulsion. He was elected a member of the National Academy of Engineering in 2009 for his leadership in the design of nuclear-reactor propulsion plants to support the power requirements of evolving combat systems.

== Education ==
Bowman graduated from Duke University in 1966. He received a Master's Degree in nuclear engineering and naval architecture/marine engineering at the Massachusetts Institute of Technology in 1977. He was also awarded an honorary doctorate of Humane Letters from Duke University in 2003.

== Naval career ==
=== Early career ===
Before his tours in command, Bowman served aboard USS Simon Bolivar (SSBN-641), USS Pogy (SSN-647), USS Daniel Boone (SSBN-629), and as executive officer of USS Bremerton (SSN-698).

=== Commands ===
Bowman served as commanding officer for both the USS City of Corpus Christi and the USS Holland.

=== Promotion to flag ===
Bowman received his first star in 1991. His service as a flag officer included tours as Deputy Director of Operations on the Joint Staff (J-3) until June 1992, Director for Political-Military Affairs (J-5) until July 1994, and Chief of Naval Personnel from July 1994 to September 1996.

=== Promotion to Director, Naval Nuclear Propulsion ===
The third successor to Admiral Hyman G. Rickover, Bowman assumed duties as Director, Naval Nuclear Propulsion, on September 27, 1996. He received his fourth star on October 1, 1996. As Director of Naval Nuclear Propulsion, he was also Deputy Administrator for Naval Reactors in the National Nuclear Security Administration, Department of Energy.

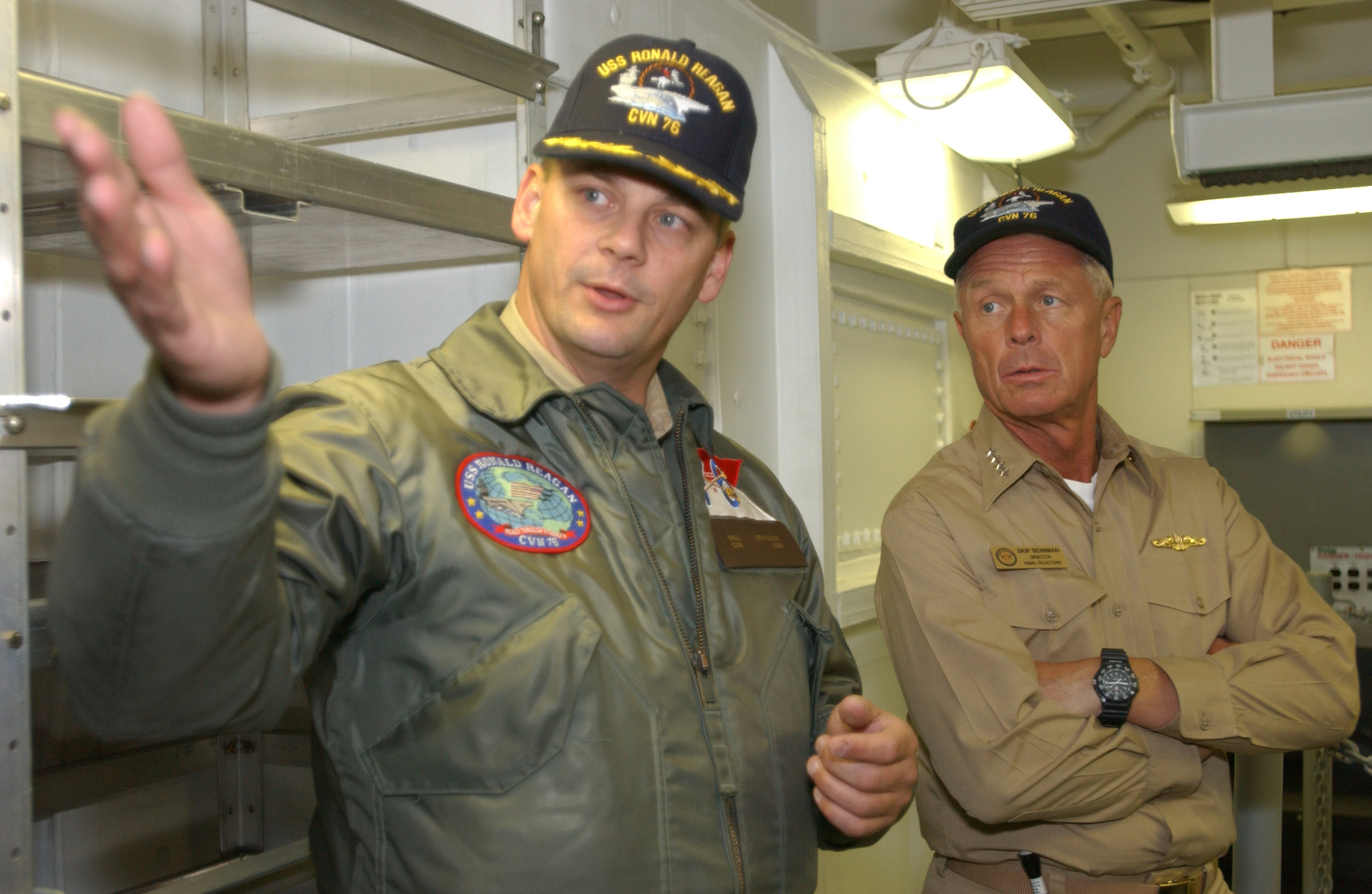
Touring the USS Ronald Reagan

== CNA Military Advisory Board ==
Bowman was on the CNA Military Advisory Board, the first group of retired generals and admirals to examine the national security implications of climate change. Set up in 2006 by Sherri Goodman, the CNA Military Advisory board brought together military leaders from the United States Army, Navy, Air Force, and Marine Corps. The report of the CNA Military Advisory Board, National Security and the Threat of Climate Change, established the concept of climate change as a "threat multiplier". Bowman writes in the 2007 report, "Our nuclear submarines operate in an unforgiving environment. Our Navy has recognized this environment and has mitigated the risk. ... We should begin planning for a similar approach in dealing with potential climate change effects on our national security".

== Civilian career ==
Bowman retired from the United States Navy in December 2004. He was appointed president and chief executive officer of the Nuclear Energy Institute (NEI) in February 2005. Bowman resigned as president and CEO of the Nuclear Energy Instititue announced 14 November 2008 in NEI Smart Brief.

Since November 8, 2010, he has been a non-executive director of BP.

== Awards ==
Under his command, his crews have earned the Meritorious Unit Commendation (three awards), the Navy Battle Efficiency E Ribbon (five awards), the Navy Expeditionary Medal (two awards), the Humanitarian Service Medal (two awards), the Sea Service Deployment Ribbon (three awards), and the Navy Arctic Service Ribbon. His personal awards include the Defense Distinguished Service Medal, the Navy Distinguished Service Medal, the Legion of Merit (with three gold stars), and the Officier de l'Ordre National du Mérite from the government of France.

In 2005, The C.J. Mack Family Foundation provided an endowment arranged by John J. Mack to the United States Naval Academy Foundation to support the Admiral Frank Bowman Scholar Program. In 2006, Bowman was made an Honorary Knight Commander of the Most Excellent Order of the British Empire (KBE).
