= Maria Korsnick =

American engineer and lobbyist

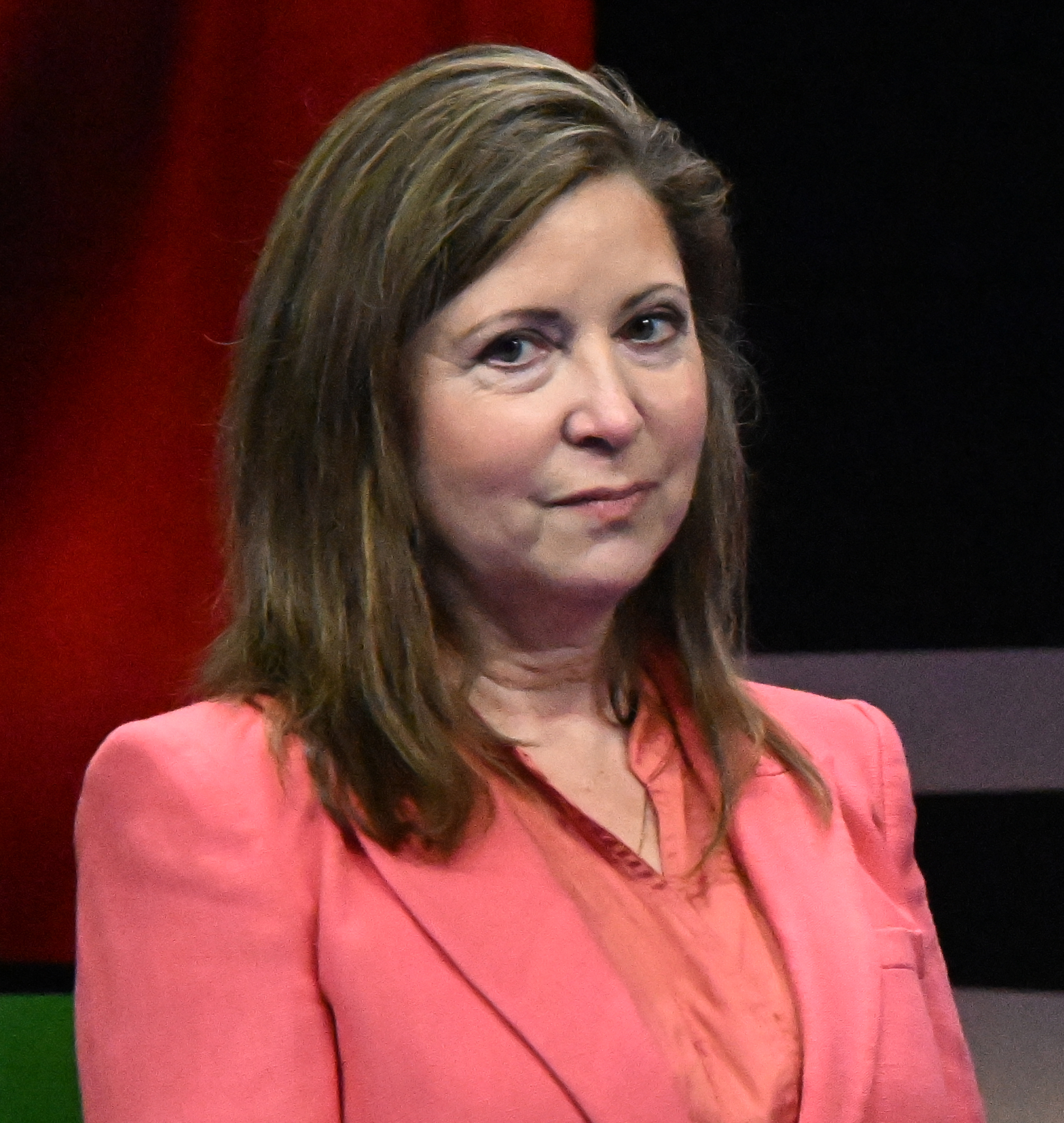
- in 2024
- Born: c.1962 Falls Church, Virginia
- Education: University of Maryland
- Occupation: nuclear engineer
- Employer: Nuclear Energy Institute
- Spouse: Michael Korsnick

Maria G. Korsnick is an American engineer and lobbyist. She was the first American woman to be a chief nuclear officer, and served as president of the Nuclear Energy Institute, a trade organization.

== Life ==
Korsnick was born in about 1962 in Falls Church, Virginia. She graduated from the University of Maryland in nuclear engineering. She became interested in nuclear engineering when she tried to understand the Three Mile Island accident. Only one in ten nuclear engineers are women. She joined the Constellation Energy Nuclear Group in 1986 as an engineer and rose to be the Chief Nuclear Officer. She left Constellation and became the senior vice-president of Northeast Operations for the Exelon Corporation. She has held a senior reactor operator license and she was in charge of the operation of several nuclear power plants. She looked after plants at Calvert Cliffs in Maryland, the R.E. Ginna in Ontario and Nine Mile Point one and two in New York state. She was the first American woman to be a chief nuclear officer.

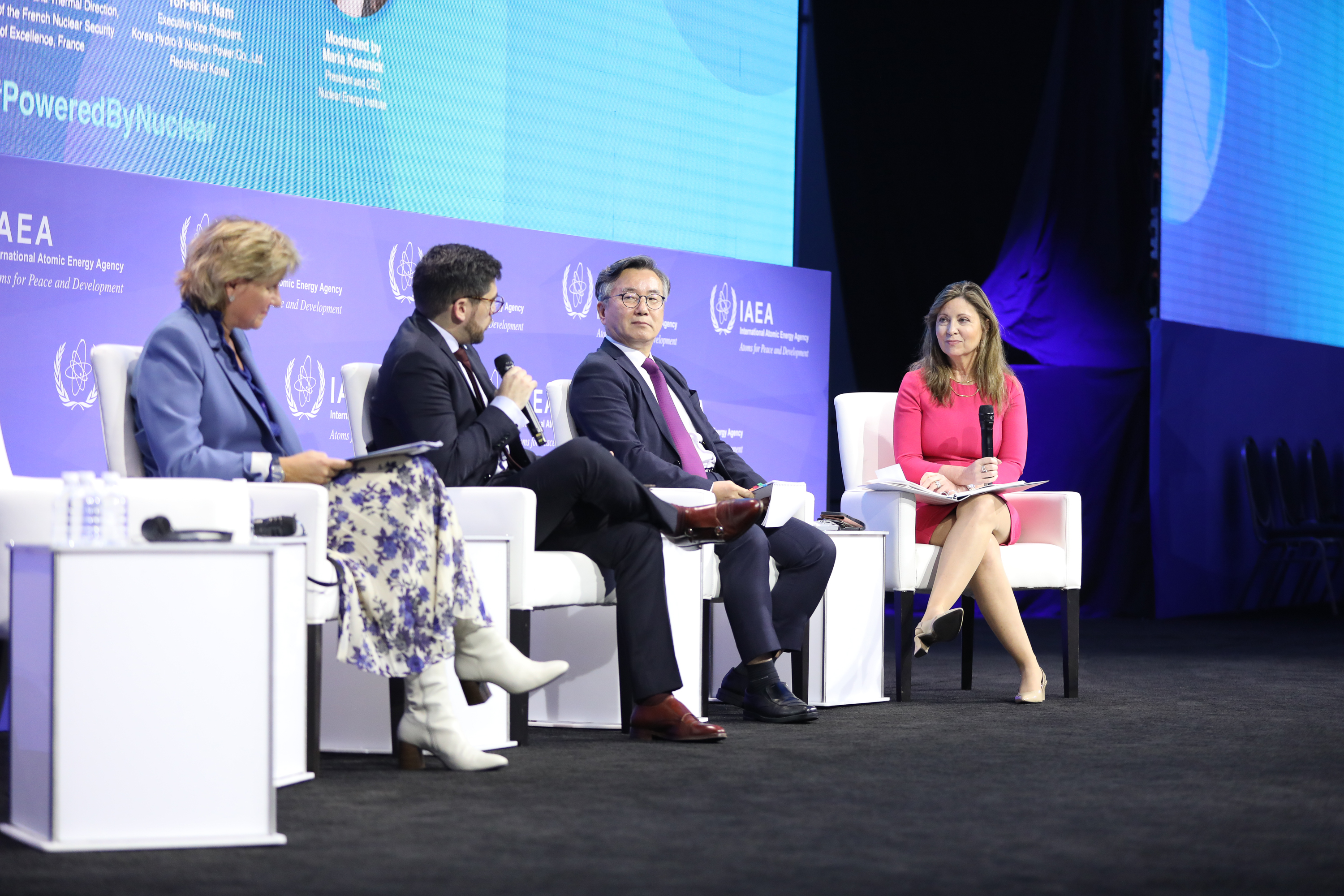
Valérie Derouet, Isidro A. Baschar, Yoh-shik Nam and Korsnick at the IAEA International Ministerial Conference on Nuclear Power in 2022

She became the president and CEO of the Nuclear Energy Institute. Korsnick is an advocate for the increased use of nuclear energy. In 2022 she and her husband funded the Maria and Michael Korsnick Nuclear Engineering Innovation Award. The university's mechanical engineering has its own reactor. This award is given to students at her alma mater who are interested in nuclear engineering. In 2024 she went with US Assistant secretary Michael Goff to Finland to discuss their plans for nuclear power. When Bill Gates invested one billion dollars in the proposed Terrapower reactor with sodium cooling she was quoted saying "We are shaping a brighter, cleaner future for our nation."
