= Ann Bisconti =

American scientist and communications expert

Ann Stouffer Bisconti is an American scientist and communications expert. She is the founder and president of “Bisconti Research Inc.," a communications research company that focuses primarily on the public opinion of nuclear power.

== Career ==
Bisconti received her PhD in Social Science Research from the Union Institute in 1978.

She served as Vice President of Research and Program Evaluation for the Nuclear Energy Institute. During her time as vice president, Bisconti initiated a 13-year program of communications and public opinion research in nuclear power.

In 1996, Bisconti founded Bisconti Research Inc., a public opinion and communications research company that conducts research for the Nuclear Energy Institute.” They also publish the results from their research on their blog.

Bisconti is the author of five books and multiple research articles.
