= Alain Bauer =

French criminologist

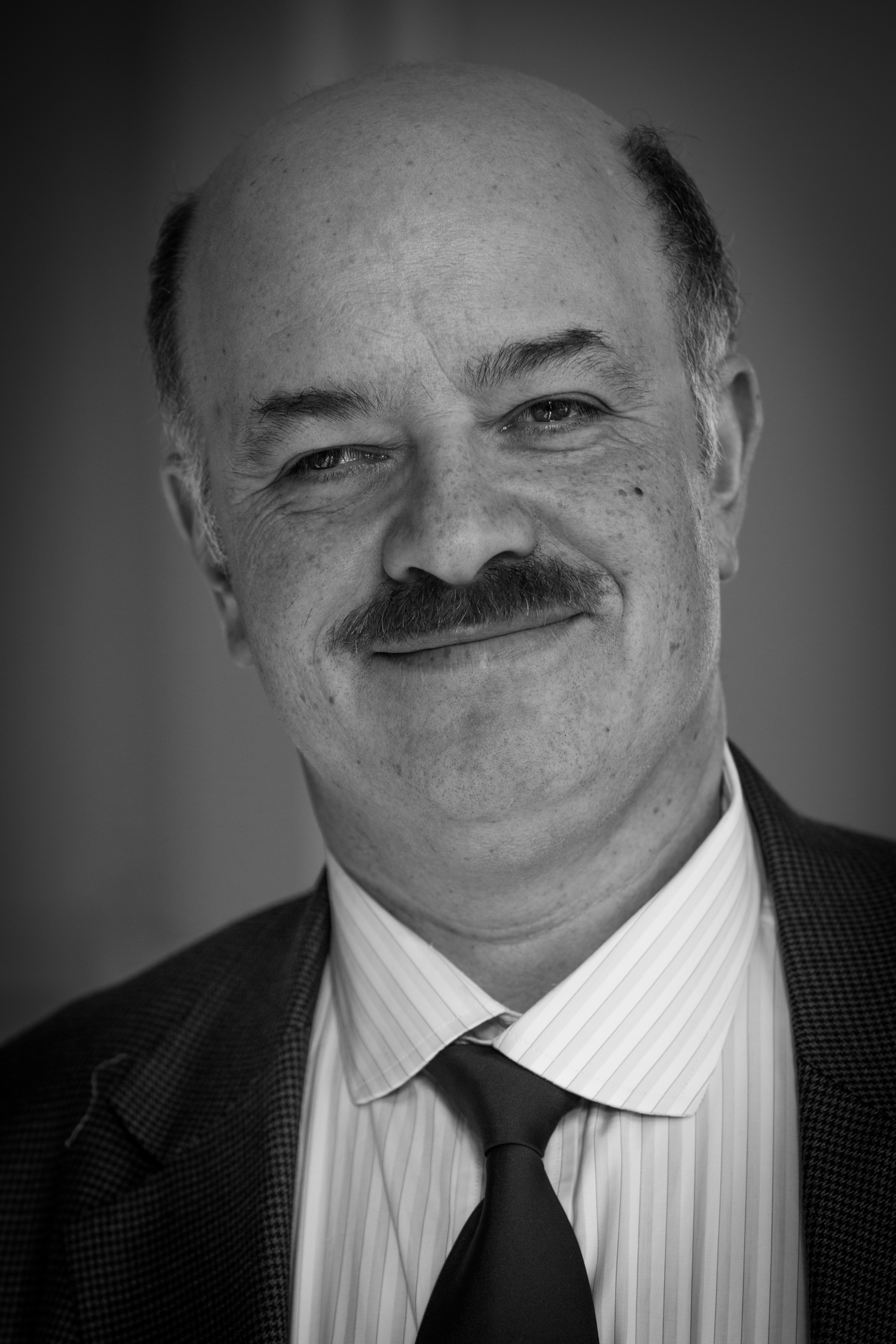
- Bauer in 2014
- Born: 8 May 1962 (age 64); Paris, France
- Occupation: Criminologist
- Known for: Grand Master of the Grand Orient de France (2000–2003)

Alain Bauer (born 8 May 1962) is a French criminologist who has been a professor of criminology at the Conservatoire national des arts et métiers (CNAM Paris) since 2009. He is also a senior research fellow at the John Jay College of Criminal Justice (New York) and the China University of Political Science and Law (Beijing). There were many protests in the scientific community in France against the appointment because he had not received a PhD.

== Career ==
Bauer was the youngest vice president of the Sorbonne in charge of Finances and Administration, an office he held from 1982 to 1989. Afterwards, he became an advisor on national security to Prime Minister Michel Rocard from 1988 to 1990.

Bauer was elected Professor of Criminology at the National Conservatory for Arts and Crafts under CNAM in Paris in 2010. He is a member of the International Association of Chiefs of Police. In 2006 and 2007, he has been appointed at the French Commission on police data control and of the French Working Group on Policing. He also worked as an advisor to the New York City Police Department (NYPD), the Los Angeles County Sheriff's Department (LASD) and the Sûreté du Québec (Canada).

He was appointed in August 2007 by President Nicolas Sarkozy to reorganise the French system on studies and research on security and strategy, focusing on the creation of a national security council. Bauer was also an advisor for the French industrial company Lafarge between 2007 and 2014.

He defends his doctoral thesis in law: Crime and criminology: a legal, political and social archaeology, under the supervision of Christian Vallar, on December 14, 2016, at the University of Côte d'Azur.

Bauer became the President of the College of the National Council for Private Security Activities (CNAPS) in 2012. Bauer was succeeded in the elected position in 2017 by the engineer Valérie Derouet. Derouet had been a vice-president of the college from 2015 to 2017.

== Awards ==
- Grand Master of the Grand Orient de France, 2000–2003
- Chancellor of the International Masonic Institute since 2003
- Knight of the Legion of Honour
- Captain of the National Order of Merit, of the National Order of Academic Palms, of the National Order of Arts and Letters
- Grand Cross of the Lafayette Order

== Works ==
- Violence et Insécurité urbaines (Que Sais Je 1998, 11ème éd., PUF 2007)
- l'Amérique, la violence, le crime (2000, 2 e éd., PUF 2001)
- la Guerre ne fait que commencer (JC. LATTES 2002, rééd. GALLIMARD 2003)
- les Polices en France (Que Sais Je 2 e éd., PUF 2002)
- le Crime aux Etats-Unis (PUF), les Polices aux Etats-Unis (PUF)
- Imaginer la sécurité globale (Pensée et les Hommes Bruxelles 2003)
- Etat d'urgence (Fayard 2004), Deux siècles de débats républicains (Edimaf) et Dico rebelle (Michalon 2004)
- l'Enigme Al Qaïda (JC. LATTES 2005)
- Mercenaires et polices privées (en coll., UNIVERSALIS 2006)
- Géographie de la France criminelle (ODILE JACOB 2006)
- les Polices au Québec (dir., Que sais-je, PUF 2006)
- Mieux contrôler les fichiers de police (DOCUMENTATION FRANCAISE 2006)
- World Chaos, Early Detection and Proactive Security (DRMCC 2007)
- Les mystères de Channel Row (JC. LATTES 2007)
- Radicalization in the West (NYPD 2007)
- L’année stratégique 2008 (Dalloz 2007)
- Le nouveau chaos mondial (Les Riaux 2007 plus éditions italien, arabe, chinois)
- L’esprit des lumières est il perdu (Le MONDE-PUR 2007)
- République, Républiques (GODF 2007)
- Pour une stratégie globale de sécurité nationale (Dalloz 2008)
- Vidéosurveillance et vidéoprotection (Que Sais Je PUF 2008)
- Le 11 Septembre (Memorial de Caen – Ouest France 2008)
- 100 Mots pour comprendre l’actualité (PUF 2008)
- Au commencement était la guerre, Fayard, 2023, 486 p. ISBN 9782213725802.
- Tu ne tueras point, Fayard, 2024, ISBN 9782213725956.
- Avec Alexis Deprau et Gilles Ferragu, Juger les terrorismes. Regards croisés de la criminologie, du droit et de l'histoire, éditions du Cerf, avril 2024 ISBN 9782204151849
