= Valérie Derouet =

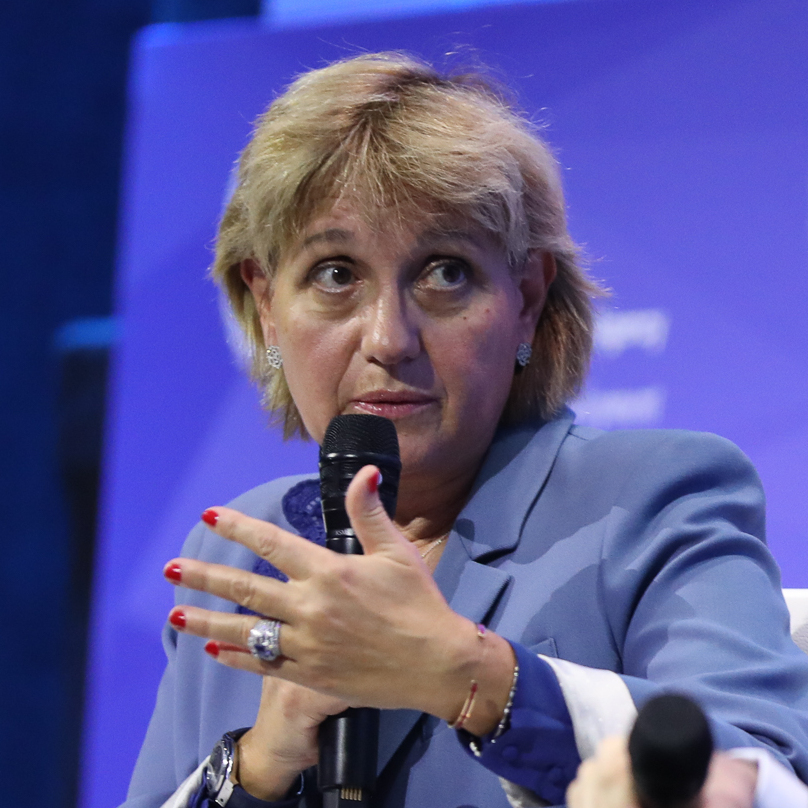
- Born: 2 March 1965 (age 61); Paris
- Education: École nationale supérieure des mines

Valérie Derouet aka Valérie Derouet-Mazoyer (born March 2, 1965) is a French engineer who is a director at EDF Nuclear and Thermal and president of the French Nuclear Security Center of Excellence.

== Life ==
Derouet was born in 1965 in Paris.

She studied engineering at the École nationale supérieure des mines. An early employer of Derouet was the utility company Veolia. In 1999 she became the marketing director at the telecommunications company Alcatel and a director of strategy at the nuclear fuel company that was then called Cogema. She moved responsibilities at Cogema in 2002 when she became their Director of Dismantling and Waste Management.

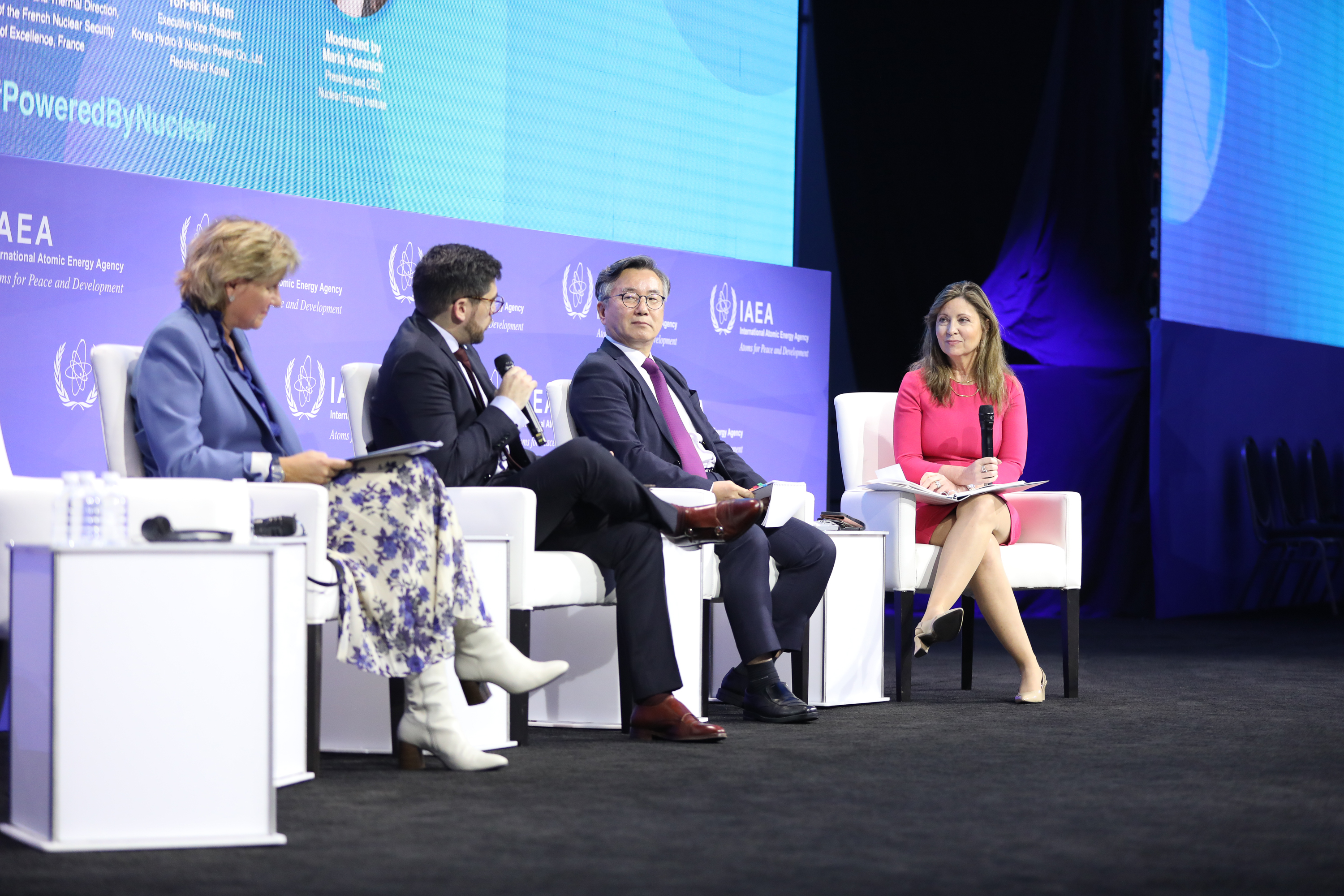
Valérie Derouet, Isidro A. Baschar, Yoh-shik Nam and Maria Korsnick at the IAEA International Ministerial Conference on Nuclear Power in 2022

In 2011 she became a senior vice president in the French company EDF. She was in charge of nuclear production.

In 2018 she was the prime author of the conference proceedings concerning " "The French Nuclear Centre of Excellence - COE". The book catalogued France's efforts to ensure that they have the best standards and trained staff in their nuclear industry as supported by the International Atomic Energy Agency (IAEA). In the same year she succeeded Alain Bauer as president of the College of the National Council for Private Security Activities (CNAPS). Bauer had the elected position since 2012 which is when Derouet became a member. Derouet had become a vice-president of the college from 2015 to 2017.

In 2022 she was appointed chair of the board of the National Council for Private Security Activities on 14 September by decree.

== Honours ==
Derouet was made a Knight of the French Legion of Honor by the minister of defence, Jean-Yves Le Drian at l'hôtel de Brienne.
