= Nuclear Engineering Student Delegation =

The Nuclear Engineering Student Delegation (NESD) is a student-run organization where students are selected to go to Washington, D.C. to meet with key policymakers and discuss the issues facing nuclear energy, policy, education, and research. Traditionally the Delegation has been composed only of nuclear engineering students, but over the years, the Delegation has broadened to include nuclear related disciplines as well. Recently, the Delegation has also had an interest in areas including non-proliferation, environmental science, national security, nuclear exports, and health physics.

== History ==
The NESD started in 1994 when a group of students went to Washington, D.C. to oppose cuts to funding for research reactors in the FY 1995 budget. This funding was reinstated as a direct result of the efforts of the Delegation, and group has been returning to Washington ever since.
