= Nuclear Energy Institute =

Nuclear industry trade association

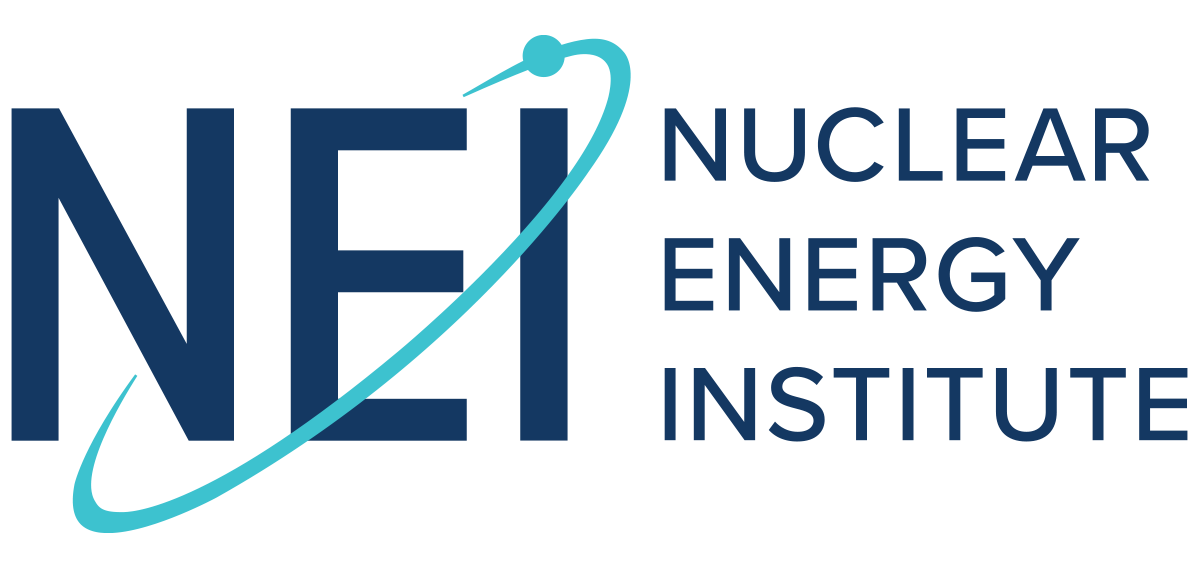
- Established: 1994; 32 years ago
- Type: 501(c)(6) non-profit organization
- Purpose: Nuclear Power
- Location: Washington, D.C.
- Coordinates: 38.89749785598171°N 77.028459359701°W
- CEO & President: Maria Korsnick
- Revenue: ▲$53,278,652 (2019)
- Expenses: $45,493,339 (2019)
- Website: www.nei.org

Previous logo of NEI until 2021.

Original logo of NEI.

The Nuclear Energy Institute (NEI) is a nuclear industry trade association in the United States, based in Washington, D.C.

== Synopsis ==
The Nuclear Energy Institute represents the nuclear technologies industry. NEI’s stated mission “is to promote the use and growth of nuclear energy through efficient operations and effective policy.”

NEI works on legislative and regulatory issues impacting the industry, such as the preservation of nuclear plants and used nuclear fuel storage.

The association represents the nuclear industry's interests before Congress and the Nuclear Regulatory Commission. It often produces research reports and testifies at federal and state congressional hearings.

The nuclear energy industry that NEI represents and serves includes: Commercial electricity generation, nuclear medicine including diagnostics and therapy, food processing and agricultural applications, industrial and manufacturing applications, uranium mining and processing, nuclear fuel and radioactive materials manufacturing, transportation of radioactive materials, and nuclear waste management

NEI is governed by a 47-member board of directors. The board includes representatives from the nation's 27 nuclear utilities, plant designers, architect/engineering firms and fuel cycle companies. Eighteen members of the board serve on the executive committee, which is responsible for NEI's business and policy affairs.

== History ==
- The Nuclear Energy Institute (NEI) was founded in 1994 from the merger of several nuclear energy industry organizations, the oldest of which was created in 1953. Specifically, in 1994, NEI was formed from the merger of the Nuclear Utility Management and Resources Council (NUMARC), which addressed generic regulatory and technical issues;
- The U.S. Council for Energy Awareness (USCEA), which conducted a national communications program; the American Nuclear Energy Council (ANEC), which conducted government affairs; and the nuclear division of the Edison Electric Institute (EEI), which handled issues involving used nuclear fuel management, nuclear fuel supply, and the economics of nuclear energy. In 1987, NUMARC and USCEA were created through a division of the Atomic Industrial Forum (AIF).
- USCEA was founded in 1979 as the Committee for Energy Awareness and it changed its name to USCEA in Jan 1992 (in the aftermath of Three Mile Island) to create ambiguity. In a 1983 magazine interview, USCEA president and CEO Harold Finger stated, "I guess we chose our name very well. Many people ask us [if USCEA] is a government agency of bureaucracy."

It has been charged with blatant misrepresentations in the CEO advertising campaign by the Safe Energy Communications Council (SECC). The membership list as of June 1990 lists 31 major power companies. The AIF was created in 1953 to focus on the beneficial uses of nuclear energy. This was two years before the international “Atoms for Peace” conference held in Geneva in 1955, marking the dawn of the nuclear age.

== Current issues ==
In addition to its core mission, NEI also sponsors a number of public communications efforts to build support for the industry and the expansion of nuclear energy, a number of which have come under attack from environmentalists and anti-nuclear activists. In 2006, NEI founded the Clean and Safe Energy Coalition (CASEnergy) to help build local support around the country for new nuclear construction. The co-chairs of the coalition are early Greenpeace member Patrick Moore and former United States Environmental Protection Agency Secretary and New Jersey Governor Christine Todd Whitman. As of April 2006, CASEnergy boasted 427 organizations and 454 individuals as members.

In April 2004, the Austin Chronicle reported that NEI has hired the Potomac Communications Group to ghostwrite pro-nuclear op-ed columns to be submitted to local newspapers under the name of local residents. In 2003 story in the Columbus Dispatch, NEI said that it engaged a public affairs agency to identify individuals with technical expertise in the nuclear energy industry to participate in the public debate. However, as many of these individuals have little experience in opinion writing for a non-technical audience, the agency provides assistance if requested, a common industry practice.

In 1999, Public Citizen filed a complaint with the Federal Trade Commission charging that an NEI advertising campaign overstated the environmental benefits of nuclear energy to consumers living in markets where sales of electricity had been deregulated. In a ruling the following December, the FTC rejected those claims concluding: NEI did not violate the law; agreed that the advertisements were directed to policymakers and opinion leaders in forums that principally reach those who set national policy on energy and environmental issues, and therefore did not constitute "commercial speech"; noted that in different circumstances, such as direct marketing of electricity, such advertising could be considered commercial speech and be subject to stricter substantiation.

NEI ran other ads with similar content, most recently one released in September 2006 touting nuclear energy's non-emitting character and the role it can play in reducing American dependence on foreign sources of fossil fuels like oil and natural gas.

In 2008, Greenpeace criticized NEI's public relations efforts and suggested that NEI's advertising about nuclear power was an example of greenwashing. In the first quarter of 2008, NEI spent $320,000 on lobbying the US federal government. Besides Congress, the nuclear group lobbied the White House, Nuclear Regulatory Commission, departments of Commerce, Defense, Energy and others in the first three months of the year. The NEI spent $1.3 million to lobby the federal government in 2007.

In 2012, NEI quoted Kathyrn Higley, professor of radiation health physics in the department of nuclear engineering at Oregon State University, who described the health impact of the Fukushima Daiichi nuclear accident to be "really, really minor", adding that "the Japanese government was able to effectively block a large component of exposure in this population".

== Advocacy ==
One of NEI's main focuses is advocating for policies that would promote beneficial uses of nuclear energy. NEI utilizes the National Nuclear Energy Strategy which has four main points that they want to hit when guiding policy: preserve, sustain, innovate, and thrive. Preservation aims to keep and preserve the current nuclear power plants that are still in use today. Sustain aims sustain the operations of the existing plants through more efficient practices and smarter regulations. The point of innovation emphasizes creating newer nuclear technologies that will produce greener energy. Lastly, thrive touches on the point of saying that it is essential to our country's leadership that we can do well in the global nuclear energy marketplace.

One of these most important pressing points is the preservation of nuclear power plants. In the next few years, about half of the operating licenses for the US’s nuclear plants will expire. However, the NEI is helping provide information and push policy to help increase the amount of Second License Renewals. Second license renewal is where a nuclear power plant can extend its original operating license for up to 20 years. This is important because if these plants are forced to close if they do not renew their license, then they will most likely not be replaced with another nuclear power plant. They will probably be replaced with a plant that utilizes fossil fuels.

Along with the advocacy of policy, NEI also is dedicated to advocating the advantages of nuclear energy as well. Some of the main advantages that NEI states are the benefits in climate, national security, sustainable development, infrastructure, and air quality by decarbonization. NEI also argues that if a country is leading in nuclear energy development, it would also be leading in the world. Nuclear power plants would be able to function even if something were to happen to the electrical grid around them. NEI claims that it could even help poverty, hunger, and stagnant economies since it could provide individuals with clean, low-cost, secure energy.

Infrastructure within America has not been able to keep pace with Americans rapidly increasing power needs. To keep the gap between power and expansion of infrastructure, NEI suggests maintaining existing nuclear power plants. This suggestion is made with the knowledge that after a power plant has closed, it is gone forever. NEI also advocates for more nuclear power infrastructure due to hundreds of jobs being created and consistent for the years to come.

NEI advocates for nuclear energy due to it being the largest source of clean energy within the United States, already producing more than half of the nation’s clean electricity. Due to the lack of emissions from nuclear energy, it acts as a beneficial option for states attempting to comply with the Clean Air Act.

== Key personnel ==
- President and Chief Executive Officer: Maria Korsnick
- Chairman: Ralph Izzo
- Vice Chairman: Paul D. Koonce
- President and Chief Executive Officer: Maria G. Korsnick
- Executive Vice President and Chief Financial Officer: Phyllis M. Rich
- Senior Vice President, External Affairs: Neal M. Cohen
- Senior Vice President, General Counsel and Secretary: Ellen C. Ginsberg
- Vice President, Policy Development and Public Affairs: John F. Kotek
- Vice President, Government Affairs: Beverly K. Marshall
- Chief Nuclear Officer and Senior Vice President, Generation and Suppliers: Doug E. True
- Vice President, Generation and Suppliers: Jennifer L. Uhle
- Vice President, Communications: Jon C. Wentzel

== See also ==
- Nuclear power in the United States
- Office of Nuclear Energy
- United States Department of Energy
- Atomic Industrial Forum
- American Nuclear Society
- Institute of Nuclear Power Operations
- Frank L. "Skip" Bowman (Biographic details)
- Institute of Nuclear Materials Management
