= Alan Dapré =

British writer

Alan Dapré (born 1965) is a British writer who has successfully written for television, radio and publishers for over 20 years. He worked as a creative and originator for Ragdoll Productions for eight years, and his episodes of Brum, Boohbah, and Blips are broadcast worldwide. He co-wrote with Robin Stevens and with Joel Wilenius developed many quirky stories and characters for the new BBC show, Tronji.

Alan Dapré is author of over 60 books for children, and 'Everything You Need To Know When You're Eight' was read in audio book form by Tony Robinson. Alan Dapré has written plays for BBC Radio 4 including 'Stranger In The Home' - a monologue read by Bernard Hepton. His play 'Comeback' was staged at the Nottingham Playhouse in 1987 with performances by Philip Middlemiss and William Ivory. His popular plays for Primary schools help developing readers gain fluency.

Dapré is also the author of the Porridge the Tartan Cat series of books published by Kelpies, an imprint of Scottish indie publisher Floris Books including: Porridge the Tartan Cat and the Brawsome Bagpipes, Porridge the Tartan Cat and the Bash-Crash-Ding, Porridge the Tartan Cat and the Kittycat Kidnap, Porridge the Tartan Cat and the Loch Ness Mess, Porridge the Tartan Cat and the Unfair Funfair, and Porridge the Tartan Cat and the Pet Show Show-Off.

Formerly a Deputy Headteacher in Nottingham, and primary school teacher at Haddon primary and nursery school Nottingham, Alan Dapré lives in Glasgow with his wife Kate and young daughter.
