= Plonsters =

German children's television program

- Directed by: Alexander Zapletal
- Voices of: Ralph Thiekötter
- Music by: Petar Vanek
- Composer: Petar Vanek
- Countries of origin: West Germany (1979-1990); Germany (1990-1997)
- No. of seasons: 2
- No. of episodes: 94

Production
- Executive producers: Ulla Brockenhuus-Schack; Christian Lehmann
- Animators: Axel Nicolai; Isolde Bayer
- Editor: Marco Rönnau
- Running time: 3 minutes, 30 seconds
- Production companies: Anima Studio für Film & Grafik GmbH

Original release
- Release: 1979 – 1997

Plonsters is a German animated children's television series produced by Anima Studio für Film & Grafik GmbH in Hamburg, Germany, Bettina Matthaei for Egmont Imagination, and later by Telescreen BV following that company's acquisition of the Egmont Imagination library. Each episode is about 3 minutes and 30 seconds long and is produced using stop motion animation done with plasticine, also called claymation. The title is a portmanteau of "plasticine" and "monsters". The characters also appeared in educational books. The names of the characters: Plummy (the Orange one), Plif (the green one) and Plops (the blue one). The episodes are about the adventures of the three protagonists, where they find themselves using modeling clay to create objects.

== Plot ==
The show features three little clay monsters, the Plonsters. They are Plif (the green plonster), who likes to play practical jokes, Plops (the blue plonster) who is the cranky one and Plummy (the orange plonster) who is the cheerful one. They can morph themselves into anything, and their language is some kind of gibberish.

The plot of the show is usually that Plif and Plops bully Plummy by ruining everything he does (as well as excluding him from some activities whenever possible), but he gets back at them every time, and every episode ends with the three of them playing together peacefully.

== Episodes ==
=== Season 1 (1979–1993) ===
1. "The Cottage"
2. "The Butterfly"
3. "The Rocket"
4. "The Wilde West"
5. "The bee"
6. "The Tiny red balloon "
7. "The record"
8. "The meeting"
9. "Pudding"
10. "Empathy"
11. "Box of bricks"
12. "Privacy"
13. "The Cookies"
14. "Fishing"
15. "The Robot"
16. "Blind"
17. "The Kiosk"
18. "Coin"
19. "Clowns"
20. "The Frogs"
21. "Music"
22. "Grapes"
23. "The Machine"
24. "The Cookies"
25. "Means of Transport"
26. "Bowling Ball"
27. "The Sleeping Beauty"
28. "The Hiccups"
29. "The Wall"
30. "The Sack"
31. "No Fear of Large Animals"
32. "Limbo"
33. "The Carpet"
34. "The Simulant"
35. "The Pretzels"
36. "First Aid"
37. "The Dog"
38. "The Meeting"
39. "The Snowman"
40. "The Pipe"
41. "The Automobile"
42. "The Birthday"
43. "The Thistle"

=== Season 2 (1993–1997) ===
1. "Snow Hunt"
2. "The Beautiful Garden"
3. "Gone Fishin'"
4. "The Lonely Island"
5. "Home Sweet Home"
6. "Chaos at the Museum"
7. "Fata Morgana"
8. "Fashion Show"
9. "Checkmate"
10. "The Fruit Market"
11. "Going to Sleep"
12. "Feeding the Ducks"
13. "Safari"
14. "At the Fairground"
15. "Paddling"
16. "Running Up That Hill"
17. "Baking Cookies"
18. "The Treasure Hunter"
19. "At the Supermarket"
20. "Camping Adventure"
21. "Chaos and Untidiness "
22. "The Plonsters Fire Brigade"
23. "The Snake Charmers"
24. "Gold Diggers"
25. "Sports Weekend"
26. "The Dinner Party"
27. "On Thin Ice"
28. "Racecar Drivers"
29. "Honey Honey"
30. "Chemical Experiments"
31. "The Sculpture Comes Alive"
32. "At the Circus"
33. "At the Hospital"
34. "Bewitched Scarecrow"
35. "The Raspberry Bush"
36. "Playground Attractions"
37. "Dance with Plonsters"
38. "Surfing with Plonsters"
39. "Miniature Golf"
40. "Arctic Adventure"
41. "The Haunting Of Knight's Castle"
42. "Goin to Venice"
43. "Merry Plonsters-Mas"
44. "Picnic At The Beach"
45. "Plonsters Of The Caribbean"
46. "The Pear Tree"
47. "The Cuckoo Eggs"
48. "How The West Was Really Won"
49. "I Want To Ride My Bike"
50. "In Outer Space"
51. "Collecting Shells"

=== Season 3 (1997-2010) ===
1. The Unlucky Umbrellabird
2. Cat-astrophe
3. Run, Froggy Run
4. Let the Nightingale Sing
5. Fireman for a Day

== Credits ==
- Idea and characters (creator): Bettina Matthaei
- Animators: Isolde Bayer, Axel Nicolai
- Model makers: Katja Calvasova, Eva Galova, Beate Bojanowska, Anke Greß, Sandra Schießl, Lene Markusen
- Production coordinators: Torben Köster, Astrid Olthoff, Kerstin Sprenger
- Editor: Marco Rönnau
- Voices: Ralph Thiekötter
- Music: Petar Vanek
- Sound recording: STUDIO FUNK NG, Christoph Welsche, STUDIO NAMU PRAHA, Adam Memens, Jiři Jahl
- Executive producers: Ulla Brockenhuus-Schack, Christian Lehmann
- Director: Alexander Zapletal

== International distribution ==
The show aired in Australia on ABC (9 April 2001 - 31 October 2014) and in Norway on TV3. It has also aired on Malaysia narrowcaster Asia Media TransNet, showing in RapidKL coaches. The show also aired in Canada on YTV between the late 1990s and the early 2000s. The shorts were also shown on Eureeka's Castle under the title Plastinots. In Brazil, the show aired on TV Cultura during the 90s on the Glub Glub program under the title Plastinots and in Portugal as Pollsters. In Italy, the show aired on Rai 3 sometimes during 2000s/2010s. In Ireland, the show aired on RTÉ as an integral part of the Bosco show sometimes during 1980s/1990s. In Japan, the show aired on Fuji TV as part of Hirake! Ponkikki. In Norway, it is known as Plipp, plopp og plomma. In Slovenia, the show aired on TV Slovenia under the title, Plastelinca, In Finland, the show aired on Yle TV2, In UK, it was also shown on Ragdoll's Pob between 1988 and 1990, In South Korea, the show aired on EBS1.

== Reception ==
The three monsters are remembered as part of the German collective imagination.
