= Anne Wood =

English children's television producer

Anne Wood CBE
- Born: Anne Savage; 18 December 1937 (age 88); Spennymoor, County Durham, England
- Occupation: Children's TV producer

Anne Wood, CBE (née Savage; born 18 December 1937) is an English children's television producer, responsible for creating shows such as Teletubbies with Andrew Davenport. She is also the creator of Tots TV, Boohbah and Rosie and Jim. She was a recipient of the Eleanor Farjeon Award.

== Career ==
She qualified as a secondary school teacher through the Bingley Training College in Yorkshire and took up her first teaching post back home in Spennymoor. She married Barrie Wood in 1959 and moved to Surbiton in Surrey where she took up a teaching role at Hollyfield Road Secondary School. Their son, Christopher Wood, co-owns the company and is the producer of shows like Twirlywoos, etc.

This was the era of the first children's paperback book and Anne became an early pioneer of a children's paperback book club scheme for schools set up by Scholastic Publications. She retired from teaching on the birth of her daughter and was taken on by Scholastic as editor of their Children's Book Club.

=== Children's books ===
When the Wood family moved to Byfleet in Surrey, she expanded her interest in how books and children's development could be brought together. In 1965, she founded and edited a quarterly magazine Books for Your Children, a publication aimed at parents, teachers, and librarians and fully supported by children's publishers. Initially the UK Arts Council supported the magazine with a small financial grant. As a further promotion of children's books, in 1969, Wood set up the Federation of Children's Book Groups, an organisation still in existence today. Also, in 1969, in recognition of her contribution to the promotion of children's books, Wood was awarded the Eleanor Farjeon Award.

=== Television producer ===
1. Tyne Tees Television for ITV 1977 Puzzle Party hosted by Gyles Brandreth and featuring Gnigel the Gnu
2. Yorkshire Television for ITV 1979 – 1983 Five series of The Book Tower, a programme aimed at stimulating children's interest in books. Hosts included Tom Baker and Stephen Moore. Winner of a Children's BAFTA in 1979 and 1982. Winner Prix Jeunesse 1980. 1982 the first series of Ragdolly Anna, based on the children's books by Jean Kenward (the first one was republished in 1983 to coincide with the series, with Anna herself from the programme on the cover). Innovative early 80s technology brought the ragdoll to life. The series starred Pat Coombs as the dressmaker owner of the ragdoll and Michele Davidson in the title role.
3. Head of Children's Programmes for TV-am. In April 1983, introduced Roland Rat, a character created by David Claridge in The Spectacular Shedvision Show. The series is generally regarded as the saviour of the ailing breakfast television service. Roland took the audience from 100,000 to 1.8 million. Wood produced six further series, Rat on the Road (1983), Roland's Winter Wonderland (1983), filmed in Switzerland, Roland Goes East (1984), filmed in Hong Kong, Rat on the Road II (1984), Operation Fog I (1984), and Roland's Countdown to Christmas (1984). Concurrent with Roland Rat, Wood produced a Sunday morning series Rub-a-Dub-Tub – a magazine-style one-hour programme for very young children. It began transmission in February 1983.
4. Ragdoll Productions Limited: Wood founded her own independent children's television production company in 1984. She retired from Ragdoll in 2021 leaving Christopher as the current owner.

==== Productions (with first transmission years) ====
- Pob's Programme for Channel 4 1985–1987 (3 series); 2 special videos produced: Pob and Friends, (1988); Pob Goes to Hospital (1990)
- Playbox for ITV 1988–1989 (1 series) (35 programmes)
- The Magic Mirror for ITV 1989 (1 series) British animation series with live action opening and closing sequences. First sponsored (Kellogg's) children's programme series shown on British television.
- Boom! for Channel 4 1990–1991 (2 series) Innovative programme series aimed at giving "special needs" children a programme of equal status.
- Storytime for BBC 1990 (series 5–6)
- Rosie and Jim for ITV 1990–2000 (8 series)
- Brum for BBC 1991–2002 (5 series)
- Tots TV for ITV 1993–1998 (8 series)
- Open a Door for BBC 1994–2003 (4 series)
- Teletubbies for BBC 1997–2001 (5 series) (365 programmes)
- Badjelly the Witch for BBC 2000 (movie) (Along with Norma Farnes)
- Teletubbies Everywhere for BBC 2002 (2 series) (52 programmes)
- Boohbah for GMTV and ITV 2003–2005 (2 series) (104 programmes)
- What Makes Me Happy for Five 2005 (1 series)
- Blips for ITV 2005–2006 (2 series)
- In the Night Garden... for BBC 2007–2009 (2 series) (100 episodes)
- Tronji for BBC 2009–2010 (2 series)
- The Adventures of Abney & Teal for BBC 2011–2012 (2 series)
- Dipdap for BBC 2011 (1 series) (52 programmes)
- Twirlywoos for BBC 2015–2017 (4 series) (100 programmes)
- B.O.T. and the Beasties for BBC 2021 (1 series) (50 programmes)

== Awards ==
- 1969 Eleanor Farjeon Award (for services to children's books)
- 1974 Ronald Politzer Award (for book promotion)
- 1997 The Baird Medal of the Royal Television Society, Midland Centre
- 1998 Fellowship of the Royal Television Society
- 1999 Veuve Clicquot Award for Business Woman of the Year 1998
- 2000 Commander of the Order of the British Empire for Services to Children's Broadcasting
- 2000 BAFTA Special Award Outstanding Contribution in Children's Television and Film
- 2003 Women in Film & Television awards the Olswang Business Award
- 2007 Harvey Lee Award for Outstanding Contribution to Broadcasting British Press Guild Awards
- 2010 Lifetime Achievement award from Mother and Baby Magazine
- 2013 Honorary Doctorate University of Birmingham
- 2014 Voice of the Listener and Viewer Award for Contribution to Children's Television
