= The Adventures of Abney & Teal =

British children's television series

- Genre: Surrealism; Comedy; Animation; Children's television series
- Created by: Joel Stewart
- Developed by: Ragdoll Productions for BBC Worldwide; CBC
- Written by: Joel Stewart, Steve Roberts, Matilda Tristram
- Starring: Adrian Scarborough; Shingai Shoniwa
- Narrated by: Adrian Scarborough
- Country of origin: United Kingdom
- Original language: English
- No. of series: 2
- No. of episodes: 52

Production
- Executive producer: Anne Wood
- Running time: 11 minutes
- Production company: Ragdoll Worldwide

Original release
- Network: CBeebies
- Release: 26 September 2011 – 22 November 2012

The Adventures of Abney & Teal is a British animated surreal children's television programme which uses a mixture of 2D and CGI animation based on the works of writer and illustrator Joel Stewart. The show, which follows the adventures of the two title characters, is set on a series of small islands on a lake in a park in an unnamed city. The show was first broadcast on CBeebies in the United Kingdom in September 2011, and is produced by Ragdoll Worldwide, the joint venture of Ragdoll Productions and BBC Worldwide.

== Characters ==
The Adventures of Abney & Teal centres on two animated rag dolls named Abney and Teal who live on an island in a lake in a park in a city. Abney lives in a hut at the base of a tree. Teal sleeps in the branches of the tree, with her only possessions a blanket and an umbrella. Abney & Teal share their environment with several friends:

=== Main characters ===
- Abney is a blue, cat-like ragdoll and the best friend of Teal. He lives in a hut at the base of the tree where Teal lives, and owns many objects that he is very fond of. His main hobby is making porridge for other characters to eat. He wears a grey and white jumper and a long orange scarf and trousers, he has fabric-like grey fur and floppy ears.
- Teal is Abney's adventurous best friend. She lives in the branches of the tree near Abney's hut, and owns an umbrella, blanket and some pillows. She has pigtails supported ribbons; one green and one blue. She wears a yellow and pink dress with two pockets and some jeans with red shoes.

=== Supporting characters ===
- Neep, a small turnip-like creature who digs underground, whose only dialogue is saying "Neep" in different tones according to his emotion.
- Bop, an aquatic brown furry mammal somewhat resembling a male elephant seal who drinks water from the lake using a teacup and blows bubbles. He can drink lake water and then inflate to great sizes, similar to a balloon. In the episode Bop's Babies, Bop is revealed to have had 4 babies (Who appear as red, dark, brown, and yellow furry mammals somewhat resembling baby elephant seals) who look just like him. They eventually grow up and leave the island via riding inside their bubbles.
- The Poc-Pocs, a set of 7 identically-shaped, but differently-sized, comma-shaped wooden objects or hard tropical tree seeds, named after the noise they make jumping about.
- Toby Dog, a diatonic button accordion/melodeon-playing dog who sits upright against a tree on the other side of the lake at the shore. He normally plays the same tune with his accordion, which the narrator describes as several sorts of music. There are rare occasions where Toby Dog will play a variation of his tune, notably the lullaby in the episode Bop's Babies. This is also similar to the tune that is played at the end of the episode (presumably by him).
- Neep's Friends and Relations, a group of 5 Neep-like characters, referred to by the narrator as "Neep's Friends and Relations", who, from time-to-time, come to visit. They look much like Neep but have different colours (Red, orange, yellow, green, and blue) and sizes and varying other features.

== Production ==
The show is produced by Anne Wood who, as founder of Ragdoll Productions, had previously brought successful children's shows such as Teletubbies, Tots TV, Rosie & Jim, and In the Night Garden to BBC Television. Wood stated that she had been an admirer of Stewart's picture books and their "distinct brand of gentle, fantastical humour and exquisite drawing style", but stated that it was his work on the book Addis Berner Bear Forgets that prompted her to contact the author. As well as creator Stewart is also the series director, and spent three years working on the show before it aired. Stewart stated in 2011 that the characters were all original constructs, designed in his sketchbooks, and the inspiration for the setting came from a visit to Victoria Park in East London. The show is co-written by Steve Roberts and Matilda Tristram. The show was created using real life models, that had been photoscanned into movable rigs.

The show is narrated by British actor Adrian Scarborough who also provides the voice for Abney, while Teal is voiced by Shingai Shoniwa, who is best known as the lead singer of the Noisettes music band. None of the other characters have speaking roles, apart from Neep's ability to say his own name. Each episode is roughly eleven minutes long. The first series of 26 episodes started airing in the United Kingdom during September 2011. The show is aimed at 3-6-year-olds, but has been recognised for its adult friendly style, which harks back to earlier British children's programmes, drawing comparisons with the work of Oliver Postgate. BBC licensing manager, Julie Kekwith, acknowledged the show's retro-feel in 2011, stating "we're sure [it] will appeal to adults and parents as well as children." and that the show has a "unique nostalgic and literary feel". While Kate Monaghan in a 2011 review described the animation as having an "old-fashioned, puppet-esque feel", Fernando De Jesus of ITV Studios commented that the show has a "sort of chic brashness".

In January 2012 it was announced that the show would be further promoted by a range of soft toys and games, made by Rainbow Designs.

The first six episodes of Series 2 were broadcast in April 2012. The remaining episodes began airing on 28 October 2012. Series 2 also had 26 episodes.

== Episodes ==
All 52 episodes were combined into 26 episodes and were broadcast on CBeebies from 2011 to 2012.

=== Series 1 (2011-2012) ===
1. The Porridge Party (26 September 2011)
2. The Star Stick (27 September 2011)
3. The Poc-Pocs' Holiday (28 September 2011)
4. The Storm (29 September 2011)
5. Stuck (30 September 2011)
6. Firefly Lullaby (3 October 2011)
7. The Rainbow Whistle (4 October 2011)
8. The Radio (5 October 2011)
9. Sky High (6 October 2011)
10. The Poc-Poc Hunt (7 October 2011)
11. The Train (10 October 2011)
12. The Mystery (11 October 2011)
13. Neep's Birthday (12 October 2011)
14. Abney Finds A Hole (13 October 2011)
15. Faraway Island (14 October 2011)
16. Bop's Best Bubble (7 November 2011)
17. The Slide (8 November 2011)
18. The Enormous Neep (9 November 2011)
19. The Buzzing Thing (10 November 2011)
20. The Moon (11 November 2011)
21. The Snow Neep (12 December 2011)
22. The Perfect Tree (16 December 2011)
23. The Artwork (6 February 2012)
24. Abney's Magic Show (7 February 2012)
25. The Woolly Tangle (8 February 2012)
26. The Leaf Sweep (9 February 2012)

=== Series 2 (2012) ===
1. The Very Cold Day (10 February 2012)
2. Straw Hat Trouble (30 April 2012)
3. The Visit (1 May 2012)
4. The Enormous Sneeze (2 May 2012)
5. The Handbag (3 May 2012)
6. Neep and the Dragon (4 May 2012)
7. The Mysterious Mist (28 October 2012)
8. The Very Hot Day (29 October 2012)
9. Hiccups (30 October 2012)
10. The Enormous Cabbage (31 October 2012)
11. The Summerhouse (1 November 2012)
12. Brilliant Wheels (4 November 2012)
13. Bop's Babies (5 November 2012)
14. Sleep Digging (6 November 2012)
15. The Porridge Tower (7 November 2012)
16. Abney's Aquarium (8 November 2012)
17. Shadows (11 November 2012)
18. The Café (12 November 2012)
19. Abney's Precious Things (13 November 2012)
20. Frogs (14 November 2012)
21. Sticky Neep (15 November 2012)
22. The Porridge Machine (18 November 2012)
23. The Camera (19 November 2012)
24. Spring Cleaning (20 November 2012)
25. Spots (21 November 2012)
26. Rock Music (22 November 2012)

== Home media ==
"The Adventures of Abney & Teal: Faraway Island and Other Adventures" was released on DVD by Abbey Home Media. It contains eight episodes. In Australia, "The Adventures of Abney & Teal: Outdoor Adventures" was released on DVD by BBC Worldwide and contains five episodes. The show was released on eight volumes on DVDs by BBC Worldwide in China.
