= Playbox (1987 TV series) =

- Screenshot of Playbox
- Created by: Anne Wood
- Directed by: Leslie Pitt
- Voices of: Pat Coombs; Keith Chegwin
- Composer: Barbara Moore
- Country of origin: United Kingdom
- Original language: English
- No. of seasons: 6
- No. of episodes: 60

Production
- Running time: 11–15 minutes
- Production companies: Ragdoll Productions; Central Independent Television

Original release
- Network: ITV (Children's ITV)
- Release: 5 January 1987 – 4 February 1992

Playbox is a British children's television programme for pre-school children aged 2–5, which was broadcast on the Children's ITV block on ITV. It debuted on 5 January 1987, and aired through 4 February 1992. Playbox was produced by Central Independent Television. The programme was the first Ragdoll television show to be made by ITV. It was created by Leslie Pitt and Anne Wood, who had just founded Ragdoll Productions.

== Overview ==
The show took place inside a red, yellow and blue box, with the main characters, Cat and Dog, being controlled by a puppeteer (Marcus Clarke) from inside the box. The puppets would draw pictures, tell stories, sing songs, and play jokes on one another (mainly typical slapstick). The puppets were voiced by Pat Coombs and Keith Chegwin, Cat and Dog respectively.

Every storytime would feature episodes from the 1969-1970 French stop-motion animation series Pépin la bulle. In the English version, the girl doll, Brigantine is renamed Polly, while Garatakeu, Fouretout, and Clapotis are simply renamed Monkey, Toucan, and Hippo respectively. The episodes featured were also slightly shorter than the original French versions. The storytime segments with Pepin la bulle, however, did not appear on any of the VHS releases.

Playbox was part of the many other children's shows that would appear on weekday lunchtimes on ITV between midday and 12:30 pm as well as Rainbow, Rod, Jane and Freddy, Allsorts, Rosie and Jim, and The Riddlers.

== Episodes ==
=== Series 1 (1987) ===
1. "Birds" (5 January 1987) - Cat shows Dog her toy roundabout with some children and some birds. They watch a TV where some children feeding birds on the bird table. Dog was swinging his racket and Cat pretends that it is a tree and gets some leaves to put on the top. Then Cat draws a picture of a bird sitting in the tree and they play a guessing game of which has come out of a birds tail.
2. "Water (1)" (12 January 1987) - Cat and Dog bought a tray of water and put a toy frog named Freddy in it. They watch a TV where a boy wash the dishes. Cat and Dog bring a green plate, a green saucer and green cup. Then Cat draws a picture of frog which is green. And they play a guessing game of where does a frog live.
3. "Shoes" (19 January 1987) - Cat shows Dog a toy crocodile which doesn't bite. Then they watch a TV of a little girl getting her new shoes with her mum. Dog gets different shoes which doesn't make a pair so he gets the right shoes. Cat draws a picture of someone with bright colours was a butterfly. Then they play a guessing game of how many spots on the butterfly.
4. "Vets" (26 January 1987) - Cat shows Dog a toy dog just like Dog! They watch a TV of some little girls took their guinea pig to the vets. Cat shows Dog some toy pets all kinds of different pets. Then Cat draws a picture of a hamster and they play a guessing game of which does a hamster eat.
5. "Birthdays" (2 February 1987) - Cat shows Dog of a toy man with long heavy arms for balancing on one step without falling over. They watch a TV of some children get presents on someone's birthday. Cat brings her present to Dog and Dog gets his present to Cat. Dog has a little teddy and so does Cat! They both got presents, and Cat draws a picture of a birthday cake and they play a guessing game of how many candles on the cake.
6. "Painting" (9 February 1987) - Cat shows Dog of a long red stick with a sheep swinging over and over. They watch a TV of some children paint with their feet. Cat finds a box of water colour paints and shows Dog what kind of paints are there. Then Cat draws a picture of a lamb, and they a guessing game of how does a woolly lamb grow up to be. Today's story with Polly, Monkey and Toucan they visit their friend Hippo and they all draw pictures, Monkey draws a picture of Hippo, Polly does a self-portrait (A picture of Myself) and Toucan draws himself as a king.
7. "Buses" (16 February 1987) - Cat shows Dog of a thinning top with the train inside, then they watch a TV of a little boy going on a ride in the bus. Cat and Dog put three small colour balls in the small cup and three big colour balls in the big cup. Then Cat draws a picture of an elephant which is bigger than the bus, then they play a guessing game of how long is the elephant's nose.
8. "Trains" (23 February 1987) - Cat shows Dog a spinning top, then they watch a TV of a little boy going on a train. Then Cat and Dog have a trouble getting other sides with the big beach ball. Cat draws a picture of a boat and they play a guessing game of which shape is the sail. Today's story with Polly, Monkey and Toucan they visit Hippo who has a surprise, in which are stilts that Polly tried first, but Monkey wanted to join in the fun by them sharing one stilt each. Monkey then showed off with tricks that ended up him colliding into Polly before falling into a haystack.
9. "Water (2)" (2 March 1987) - Cat and Dog bring a tray of water and they bought a toy crocodile who likes to get wet. They watch a TV of a little boy taking a bath. Dog finds a rain hat and welly boats for him to wear and he pretends to splash in the puddle. Then Cat draws a picture of a crocodile and she and Dog play a guessing game of where does a crocodile lives.
10. "Cranes" (9 March 1987) - Cat shows Dog a toy crane that can life things up. Then they watch a TV of some children saw a real tall crane. Cat and Dog build different shape coloured bricks. Cat draws a picture of castle and they play a guessing game of what's on the top of the castle.
11. "Shopping" (16 March 1987) - Cat shows Dog a toy cow. They watch a TV of a little girl going shopping with her mum. Cat brings her shopping and shows them to Dog. Can draws a picture of cow and she and Dog play a guessing game of what do cows like to eat.
12. "Playdough" (23 March 1987) - Cat shows Dog her toy bee which it won't sting anybody. They watch a TV of some children play with their playdough. Cat and Dog make a flower out of modeling clay. Cat draws a picture of a bee and they play a guessing game of how many bees can they see.
13. "Hippo" (30 March 1987) - Cat shows Dog her toy Hippo that has a fish on a string that when pulled it will make his mouth move and he'll eat it. They watch a TV of some children playing with their toys and then helping their mum doing the vacuum cleaning. Cat and Dog look at the shopping they bought of Biscuits, Milk, Yogurt and Cheese. Cat draws a picture of a mouse and they play a guessing game of what a mouse likes to eat. Today's story with Polly, Monkey and Toucan they visit Hippo who is feeling unhappy because he has not had a present for his birthday so they give him a comb to use a teeth which makes Hippo very happy.
14. "Clothes" (6 April 1987) - Cat shows, as Dog's surprise, models of Hippo and Toucan on a wooden winding toy device during which Dog observes them both wearing a jumper and scarf respectively. On TV, they watch a young girl and her younger brother getting ready for school on a cold day and the brother plays 'Hunt the Thimble' while looking for one of his gloves. After this, Cat and Dog try to match up three pairs of gloves. Cat then draws a picture of "someone you'll only see when it's very cold," that being a snowman. They then play the guessing game revolving around what the snowman wears round its neck.
15. "Pet Shop" (13 April 1987) - Cat shows Dog's surprise which is a hopping toy parrot. They then watch, on TV, a mother and a daughter visiting a pet shop (one of which includes a parrot) to buy a pet rabbit and food to go with it. Cat observes its noisy atmosphere and asks Dog to guess the noises of three devices, those being a bell, a telephone and a clock. Cat congratulates Dog's listening skills and linking this, she draws him a picture of a notable listening animal with very big ears: a rabbit. They then play the guessing the game revolving around what rabbits like to eat. Featuring Sooty cameo as a Moneybox

=== Series 2 (1988) ===
- Episode 201 (4 January 1988)
- Episode 202 (11 January 1988)
- Episode 203 (18 January 1988)
- Episode 204 (25 January 1988)
- Episode 205 (1 February 1988)
- Episode 206 (8 February 1988)
- Episode 207 (15 February 1988)
- Episode 208 (22 February 1988)
- Episode 209 (29 February 1988)
- Episode 210 (7 March 1988)

=== Series 3 (1989) ===
- Episode 301 (2 January 1989)
- Episode 302 (9 January 1989)
- Episode 303 (16 January 1989)
- Episode 304 (23 January 1989)
- Episode 305 (30 January 1989)
- Episode 306 (6 February 1989)
- Episode 307 (13 February 1989)
- Episode 308 (20 February 1989)
- Episode 309 (27 February 1989)
- Episode 310 (6 March 1989)

=== Series 4 (1990) ===
- Episode 401 (8 January 1990)
- Episode 402 (15 January 1990)
- Episode 403 (22 January 1990)
- Episode 404 (29 January 1990)
- Episode 405 (5 February 1990)
- Episode 406 (12 February 1990)
- Episode 407 (19 February 1990)
- Episode 408 (26 February 1990)
- Episode 409 (5 March 1990)
- Episode 410 (12 March 1990)

=== Series 5 (1991) ===
- Episode 501 (8 January 1991)
- Episode 502 (15 January 1991)
- Episode 503 (22 January 1991)
- Episode 504 (29 January 1991)
- Episode 505 (5 February 1991)
- Episode 506 (12 February 1991)
- Episode 507 (19 February 1991)
- Episode 508 (26 February 1991)
- Episode 509 (5 March 1991)

=== Series 6 (1992) ===
- Episode 601 (7 January 1992)
- Episode 602 (14 January 1992)
- Episode 603 (21 January 1992)
- Episode 604 (28 January 1992)
- Episode 605 (4 February 1992)

== Home media releases ==
VHS title	Release date	Episodes
Playbox Volume 1 (VC1194)	1 October 1990	Vets, Birthdays, Painting, Playground (1)
Playbox Volume 2 (VC1113)	1 October 1990	Birds, Water (1), Shoes and Dogs
Playbox Volume 3 (VC1167)	4 March 1991	Games, Buses, Playground (2) and Rubbish
Playbox Video Fun Pack (TB0003)	5 August 1991	Walking, Hippo and Water (3)
Playbox - Video and Book (TB1003)	28 October 1991	Pet Shop, Clothes, Cranes and Ducks
Playbox Video Fun Pack Re-Release (TB0003)	3 February 1992	Walking, Hippo and Water (3)
Playbox Volume 4 (VC1237)	2 March 1992	Roadworks, Shopping, Water (2) and Trains
Children's Choice (VC1257)	1 June 1992	Washing and Car Washing (Compilation VHS with 'Rosie and Jim' and 'Brum')
Playbox - Busy Bee and Other Stories (VC1247)	5 October 1992	Trees, Cars, Playdough and Playground (3)
