= Tronji =

British animated children's television series

- Developed by: Ragdoll Productions; BBC Worldwide
- Composer: James McWilliam
- Country of origin: United Kingdom
- Original language: English
- No. of episodes: 30

Production
- Running time: 23 minutes
- Production company: Ragdoll Worldwide

Original release
- Network: CBBC
- Release: 11 May 2009 – 12 February 2010

Tronji was an animated children's television series and a multiplayer online game, produced in the United Kingdom and aimed at children aged six to eight years. It was commissioned by CBBC, and produced by the joint venture Ragdoll Worldwide. Andrew Davenport devised the television format for Tronji, created the key characters and is the series producer. Anne Wood had the original concept for Tronji and was the initial producer.

The TV series launched on CBBC on 11 May 2009, together with an online game. A total of 30 episodes were broadcast.

== Plot ==
Tronji took place in the animated universe of Tronjiworld, where creatures known as Tronjis lived happily. However, all of that changed when Tronjiworld was struck by a natural disaster, known simply as "Wobble", which caused immense destruction to Tronjiworld by draining away its colour and happiness.

Each episode followed the Great Eek summoning three children from Peopleworld (the Tronji name for Earth) and enlisting their help in reaching the saddest part of the broken pieces of Tronji and repairing the damage done using their special skills, whilst the Great Eek and Tronji-O located Tronji-I in Peopleworld, who usually materialized within an unhappy situation, in which the Great Eek and Tronji-O use gem power from the children to fix the situation and therefore used Double Happiness to return the broken pieces back together. In the middle of the episode, when the first helping child's gem colour was released, Tronji-O and The Great Eek used that gem power to initiate a swap, which solved the problem in Peopleworld but created another problem in Tronjiworld. Before the children entered tronjiworld, they would draw themselves as tronjis based on their skills which they coul become with their gem power.

== Characters ==
The Great Eek is the ruler of Tronjiworld who lives within the Dome and watches over the world. He is a pale-skinned being dressed in purple, including a large top hat with a jewel on the front and carries a cane which doubles as a wand, which he uses to reconnect the broken pieces of Tronjiworld. Whenever trouble strikes in Tronjiworld and there are significant levels of sadness, he will summon three skilled children from Peopleworld to help him in fixing the problem. His catchphrases are "Wobbly-I-O!" and "What a wobbler!".

Tronji-O is a female Tronji who has a red, bean-shaped body, a golden disc on her stomach and three short hairs on her head. She often assists The Great Eek in helping to restore happiness to Tronjiworld and Peopleworld, seeing as her brother Tronji-I always gets taken to Peopleworld whenever Wobble strikes. She communicates in a series of squeaks, including the signature Tronji phrase "Nik-Nak-Nor" and when she is upset, she wails loudly.

Tronji-I is Tronji-O's twin brother. He is identical to his sister, except he is coloured dark blue and has a golden band around his stomach. Whenever Wobble strikes, he is often accidentally teleported to Peopleworld, where he usually appears within an unhappy situation, but once Tronji-O is able to make contact with him, they will use their powers to make a swap, which will usually result in the Peopleworld situation changing to happiness, but also causes another problem in Tronjiworld.

Ooee-Ooee is a flying, cloud-like Tronji who always says his name and flashes as he does. During missions, he gives one of the children a ride to the place with the most sadness in time for the "Happy Ending". When the Great Eek uses his powers to bring the broken pieces of Tronjiworld back together, Ooee-Ooee turns golden, a result of 'Double Happiness'.

The Gap Minders are a pair of guards who protect The Gap. In order to pass them, the children must answer the Gap Minders' Impossible Question, which is normally a mathematical question relating to the subject of the children's skills. Their name comes from their phrase 'mind the gap'.

== Episodes ==
The episodes were a part of The British Broadcasting Corporation

Number	Episode Name	Peopleworld Children In The Episode And Their Skills	Tronjiworld Story	Peopleworld Story	Swap Effects	Monochrome Zone Subplot	Gem Colours	Children's Tronji Appearances
1	Popcorn Volcano	Fabienne (division), Asilinda (lifting) & Macauley (painting)	A huge tronjiblimp lands on top of the popcorn volcano rendering it useless for the tronjisnaffers.	In Estonia, A waiter is prevented from delivering food through a narrow doorway.	wide for narrow	There are several squabbling Tronjigeese fighting over 1 Tronji cake.	Blue (Fabienne), Yellow (Asilinda) & Purple (Macauley)	Fabienne- a division sign, Asilinda- a weight, Macauley- a pallette.
2	Dingdong Dell	Weiyao (telling the temperature), Isaac (playing the violin) & Sarah (pogo-ing)	The tronji dingdongs can't ring their bells for the tronjitrumps because the bell ropes are all tied up.	In South Africa, a wedding dress train is too short for the bridesmaids to keep hold of.	long for short	The tronjis' soup has turned to ice.	Pink (Weiyao), Orange (Isaac) & Light Green (Sarah)	Sarah- a pogo stick, Isaac- a violin, Weiyao- a thermometer.
3	Telly Town	Salman (cooking), Shauna (listening) & Omar (shapes)	3 Tronjisaurs are blocking the big telly in Telly Town and the tronjiboggles can't see.	In India, a ball at a cricket match is too small to be hit.	big for small	A group of Tronjis race round a daft triangular racetrack.	Purple (Salman), Yellow (Shauna) & Red (Omar)	Salman- an oven, Shauna- an ear, Omar- made out of shapes.
4	Water Works	Serena (drinking through a straw), Andrew (measuring) & Merrielle (finding things)	The Tronjismops cannot wash their cars at the Waterworks as they are stuck in holes	In the Philippines, a bus door is jammed and the tourists can't get on.	open for closed	The TronjiLongylickies need to cross the grand Tronji Canyon.	Purple (Serena), Red (Andrew) & Green (Merrielle)	Serena- a straw, Andrew- a ruler, Merrielle- a magnifying glass.
5	Yaa-Boo Land	Macauley (organising information), Olivia (fashion) & Calum (gardening)	The Tronjiboos' game of peek-a-boo is ruined as the bushes have holes in them.	In the UK, a woman on a date loses her hat in the river and her fiancé can't get it as their boat is upside down.	rightside up for upside down	The tronjidongles have run out of bubble mixture, and can't find the locker that holds more bubble mixture.	Green (Macauley), Pink (Olivia) & Yellow (Calum)	Calum- a watering can, Macauley- a grid, Olivia- a high heel.
6	Winter Whoopsy Land	Rebecca (drawing circles), Robert (trampolining) & Prapti (flying kites)	The tronjisnugglers' socks have shrunk and they are left out in the cold.	In New Zealand, an ice cream van is too hot and all the ice cream melts before it can get to the customers.	hot for cold	The Tronjiflishes can't drink their pinky water because their pond is all iced up.	Yellow (Rebecca), Green (Robert) & Pink (Prapti)	Rebecca- a compass, Robert- a spring, Prapti- a kite.
7	Tronji Rockery	Reuben (thinking), Georgia (tap dancing) & Kannika (sewing)	At the Tronji Rockery, the Tronjisaurs' eggs are mixed up with rocks in a ditch after the rockery is tipped up.	In the UK, several objects fall intro a deep swimming pool and it's too deep to get them back.	shallow for deep	The Tronjibloomers can't deliver the socks over the grand tronji canyon.	Red (Reuben), Green (Georgia) & Orange (Kannika)	Reuben- a thought bubble, Georgia- a pair of legs with tap shoes, Kannika- a spindle and thread.
8	Tronji Sorting Office	Masuma (jigsaw puzzles), Mohammed (bike riding) & Rachael (climbing)	A giant pink lemonade ice lolly blocks the centre of the tronji sorting office's track and the tronjilobs and tronjigrabs can't deliver their goods.	In China, a washing line hung too low is getting in the way of pedestrians.	high for low	The tronjiflips' biddle ball is stuck on top of a house.	Orange (Masuma), Green (Mohammed) & Red (Rachael)	Rachael- a ladder, Masuma- a jigsaw piece, Mohammed- a mountain bike.
9	Slippery Slopes	Elaf (cake decorating), Kayne (circles) & Robert (tenor horn)	The Tronjiskiers are stuck in very sticky treacle and can't do their ski jumps.	In the US, a windsurfer's sail is stuck lying flat.	standing for flat	The Tronjisnaffers Can't Reach their Soda straws.	Pink (Elaf), Green (Kayne) & Orange (Robert)	Kayne- made out of circles, Elaf- a cake, Robert- a tenor horn.
10	Roly-Bowly Land	Shanice (sums), Ashley (building things) & Kyle (cartwheels)	Icing sugar blankets Roly-Bowly Land and spoils the Tronjirollers' game of mega-skittles.	In the Philippines, a goat is running around because the door handle it was tied to is too light.	heavy for light	The Tronjimenders have the wrong numbers of wheels on Their Cars.	Purple (Shanice), Orange (Ashley) & Blue (Kyle)	Shanice- a calculator, Kyle- a wheel, Ashley- made out of bricks.
11	Tronjibowl Arena	Theo (photography), Shaira (wrapping presents) & Thomas (measuring)	The tronjiflips at the tronjibowl arena can't play keepy-uppy with their biddle ball because it has bounced inside a cave.	In New Zealand, a group can't inflate their raft because there is no air in their pump.	inflated for deflated	The Tronjiscoots have an unfair race on their race track.	Yellow (Theo), Light Blue (Shaira) & Orange (Thomas)	Theo- a camera, Shaira- a present, Thomas- a tape measure.
12	Tronjisaur Golf Course	Finn (drumming), David (numbers) & Shakeela (building sandcastles)	The golf platforms collapse under the weight of the tronjisaurs.	In the US, A basketball is too soft to play with.	unstable for firm	A Tronjipaddler's box is stuck in a tree on an island in a lake.	Green (Finn), Yellow (David) & Orange (Shakeela)	Finn- a drum kit, David- the number 6, Shakeela- a sandcastle.
13	Snoggyland	Tilly (folding paper), Timothy (mending things) & Jade (telling the time)	The Tronjisnogglers of Snoggyland cannot enjoy bouncing and snogging each other on their trampolines because giant clouds are blocking their view.	In Sri Lanka, a man can't harvest coconuts because his rope is too slack for him to travel between the palm trees.	slack for straight	The Tronjitoddles can't seem to traverse the piping in the Waterworks.	Yellow (Tilly), Light Blue (Timothy) & Purple (Jade)	Tilly- a piece of paper, Timothy- a hammer, Jade- an alarm clock.
14	Cheesey-Wig Land	Izyan (answering questions), Estifa'a (digging) & Aliosha (tying knots)	The tronjitonks' wigs land on tronjihoppers after being blown away, and they are near impossible to catch.	In South Africa, a stool is too tall to sit on at the hairdressers'.	tall for short	The Tronjimops don't know how to open their gel jar.	Pink (Izyan), Green (Estifa'a) & Blue (Aliosha)	Izyan- a question mark, Estifa'a- a shed, Alisoha- a knot.
15	Tiddly-piddly Plop Pond	Isobel (tennis), Yong-Ha (bubblegum bubbles) & Sanjay (trigonometry)	The Tronjibobs cannot dive into the Tiddly Piddly Plop Pond because the pond has moved out of reach from their bobble tree diving board.	In New Zealand, a farmer is stuck in mud because one of his truck's tyres is too smooth.	rough for smooth	The Tronjibees Can't use the hose at the right angle for their glitter tree.	Green (Isobel), Red (Yong-Ha) & Orange (Sanjay)	Isobel- a tennis ball, Sanjay- a protractor, Yong-Ha- a pair of lips.
16	Tronji Art Gallery	Joanna (makeup), Ciaran (goalkeeping) & Joe (cubes)	The Tronjipotters are lost in a maze around their splodge tree.	In China, a food cart is too fast for the operator to halt.	static for mobile	A Tronjibloomer is having problems trying to draw a picture of all the Tronjibobs on a sheet of paper.	Red (Joanna), Blue (Ciaran) & Purple (Joe)	Joanna- a lipstick, Ciaran- a glove, Joe- made out of cubes.
17	Shakey-Snake Land	Tony (weighing), Alice (dancing) & Aisyah (making jewellery)	Bubbles end up everywhere in Shakey-Snake Land, which get inside the tronjicharmer's saxophones and disrupt their music.	In Estonia a piano is horribly out of tune for a concert.	tuned for wonky	The Tronjibooters have mixed up toot boots.	Green (Tony), Yellow (Alice) & Warm Red (Aisyah)	Tony- a weighing scale, Alice- a foot, Asiyah- a necklace.
18	Lollipop Forest	Eric (counting), Chelsea (basketball) & Nashwa (vacuuming)	A flurry of feathers cover the tronjilongylickies' lollies, making them inedible	In the UK, a bendy hose pipe causes unhappiness for a woman watering her flowers in front of her neighbours.	firm for bendy	There isn't equality between the tronjis' tronjiveg.	Green (Eric), Orange (Chelsea) & Blue (Nashwa)	Nashwa- a vacuum, Eric- made out of numbers, Chelsea- a basketball
19	Grassy Hump Bump	Alexandra (styling hair), Dmitri (football) & Stephen (maths)	The star swingers can't grow their grass because the stars they were on flickered away and now they are stuck on the ground.	In Mongolia, some ice collectors have trouble trying to pull their ice because their rope is too long.	short for long	The Tronjiteenies don't have their fair shares on the Tronjiblimps.	Yellow (Alexandra), Blue (Dmitri) & Red (Stephen)	Stephen- the number 5, Dmitri- a football, Alexandra- a hairdryer.
20	Freaky Mirror Land	Hannah (solving logic problems), Mazin (hockey) & Jessica (tidying up)	The Tronjiflounces have lost their polka dots in a teeming tronjitop tornado and the freaky mirrors won't recognize them.	In Sweden, a race car driver's windscreen is too dirty.	dirty for clean	The tronjilobs can't reach their ping fruit.	Red (Hannah), Green (Mazin) & Turquoise (Jessica)	Hannah- the number 4, Jessica- made out of cleaning products, Mazin- a hockey stick.
21	Tronji-Bop Talent Studio	Leah (running), Emily (blowing up balloons) & Ryan (maths)	The tronji belli boppers can't dance anymore because their giant bopafonic flapdefone speaker fell over and played super flat bass pipes straight into the ground, so loud and grumbly that the dance floor vibrated underneath them.	In India, a wedding car pulled by oxen is too slow to get to the venue on time.	slow for fast	A few tronjibloomers keep bumping into each other while ice skating because the ice cube they're on is too small.	Blue (Leah), Dark Purple (Emily) & Yellow (Ryan)	Ryan- the number 8, Leah- a pair of running shorts, Emily- a balloon.
22	Sock Tree Nursery	Gian (division), Simone (ice skating) & Chelsey (skipping)	The tronjisqeegees can't clean the glasshouses of the sock trees because they were covered by a mat of itchy, scratchy tumblefuzz.	In the US, a dog bath is too big for a mother and her daughter to wash their small dog.	small for big	Some Tronjibobs have trouble placing tiles for their swimming pool.	Yellow (Gian), Blue (Simone) & Mauve (Chelsey)	Gian- a percentage sign, Simone- an ice skate, Chelsey- a skipping rope.
23	Tinkle-Water Fountain	Oliver (didgeridoo), Salma (timing things) & Simon (drawing)	The tinkle water fountain is clogged with toffee and the tronjihonks can't water their flowers.	In Canada, an empty grit box causes delays for some children getting to a birthday party.	empty for full	A group of Tronjis are having problems with wallpapering the houses as the glue is still wet.	Yellow (Oliver), Green (Salma) & Purple (Simon)	Oliver- a didgeridoo, Salma- a sand timer, Simon- a pencil.
24	Ping-Fruit Petrol Station	Will (bicycle repairs), Alex (triangles) & Sukhraj (construction)	The Ping Fruit Petrol Station refinery machine is blocked by a giant slice of pooey, gooey splodge-goo gateau and the Tronji Flatbacks are unable to deposit the ping fruit in it.	In the UK, a paint sprayer is blocked for a man trying to paint a house yellow.	free-flowing for blocked	There is No stable support for the Tronji-Boggles' telescope.	Green (Will), Pink (Alex) & Yellow (Sukhraj)	Sukhraj- a digger, Will- a bicycle pump, Alex- made out of triangles.
25	Tronji Library	Margot (timing), Alex (sense of smell) & Raj (fishing)	The Tronjibods cannot read their tronjipedia of tronji facts due to the loud snoring of several soundly sleeping Tronjihonks.	In Sweden, a drain is too dark for a woman to locate her newly bought necklace in it.	light for dark	The Tronji-Smops are having trouble trying to time going through a dark tunnel.	Green (Margot), Blue (Alex) & Yellow (Raj)	Margot- a stopwatch, Alex- a nose, Raj- a fishing rod.
26	Rice Cake Puffers	Danijel (maths), Tiana (singing) & Naiha (science)	In sweetyland, the rice cake puffers are covered in a thick coat of sugar and the tronjichompers have nothing to eat.	In the Philippines, a bike won't start for a deliveryman.	non-moving for moving	The tronjiplods try to place a load on a tronji flatback.	Blue (Danijel), Green (Tiana) & Red (Naiha)	Tiana- a microphone, Naiha- made out of science equipment, Danijel- a plus sign.
27	Caravan Holiday	Lauren (yo yo-ing), James (probability) & Nico (strength)	The Tronjitoddles, who have been holidaying in their caravans for so long that they forgot where they were going and where they even came from, are stuck in a forest of giant umbrella mushrooms.	In Estonia, a box containing a very heavy sculpture can't be lifted up the stairs to the art gallery.	sphere for cube	The tronjibloomers get their socks mixed up.	Yellow (Lauren), Purple (James) & Red (Nico)	Lauren- a yoyo, Nico- has really strong arms, James- a dice.
28	The Everlasting Hedge	Pascual (measuring volume), Amelia (majorettes) & Roza (knitting)	The tronjisniplets can't snip their everlasting topiary because their everlasting hedge was descended upon by a duvet cloud as long as the hedge itself.	In India, an unsturdy tent pole makes it difficult to erect a tent in a marketplace.	flat for upright	The tronjihippos' mud dries up.	Blue (Pascual), Yellow (Amelia) & Pink (Roza)	Pascual- a measuring jug, Roza- a ball of yarn, Amelia- a baton.
29	Fizzflower Lilypond	Olivia (thinking), Courtney (ballet) & Jack (skateboarding)	The tronjiwhiffles can't pollinate their fizzflowers to make fizzy fountains because they are firmly closed.	In Avissawella, Sri Lanka, a plant pot is too heavy to lift onto a train.	light for heavy	The tronjiboggles don't have enough light to see inside a cave.	Yellow (Olivia), Pink (Courtney) & Green (Jack)	Courtney- a ballet dress, Olivia- a light bulb, Jack- a skateboard.
30	TronjiBoggle Train	Zahraa (maths), Dan (making tea) & Mandeep (pool)	Bop-tangerines fall onto the track of the tronjiboggle train, halting the journey for both the tronjilugs and tronjiboggles.	In South Africa, there is wet cement outside a renovated house which makes it difficult for the removal men to carry items out.	wet for dry	A tronjibooter falls down the stairs and its bootcase's contents become all jumbled up.	Mauve (Zahraa), Blue (Dan) & Red (Mandeep)	Zahraa- a plus sign, Dan- a teapot, Mandeep- a pool ball.
