= Robin Stevens (puppeteer) =

English puppeteer, actor, director and writer

- Born: Robin Gordon Stevens; 30 January 1960 (age 66); Chorleywood, Hertfordshire, England
- Occupations: Puppeteer, actor, television director, writer
- Years active: 1985–present

Robin Gordon Stevens (born 30 January 1960) is an English puppeteer, actor, director, and writer for children's television. His programmes include Pob's Programme, Corners, Teletubbies, Rosie and Jim, Tots TV, Boohbah and Blips.

== Early life ==
Stevens was born in Chorleywood, England. He trained at the Cannon Hill Puppet Theater from 1978 to 1982 with John Blundall.

== Career ==
Stevens worked for Ragdoll Productions from 1985 to 2005, writing the series Pob's Playtime, Rosie and Jim, and co-writing Tots TV. Later he co-wrote scripts and originated content with Alan Dapre. He also worked for the BBC, puppeteering Jo Corner on Corners. He puppeteered Pob in Pob's Programme, Jim and Duck in Rosie and Jim, Tom in Tots TV (he also wrote the scripts with Tiny's puppeteer Andrew Davenport), and The Man in the Magic House in Teletubbies (he voiced the man in all foreign dubs except for the PBS Kids version where US actress Dena Davis redubbed the voice). Stevens also played Grandpappa in Boohbah and Mr. Perfect in Blips.

Stevens won a BAFTA for his episode of Tots TV 'Baking Bread'.

Stevens lives in the US, where he runs a cider business.
