= Tots TV =

1993 British children's television programme

- Created by: Anne Wood
- Developed by: Ragdoll Productions
- Written by: Robin Stevens; Andrew Davenport
- Directed by: Rob Ollerton; Tom Poole; Nick Hayward-Young; Robin Toyne
- Starring: Véronique Déroulède; Claire Carre; Alexandra Hogg; Robin Stevens; Andrew Davenport
- Composer: Andrew McCrorie-Shand
- Country of origin: United Kingdom
- Original languages: English, French (Spanish in the US version)
- No. of episodes: 276

Production
- Producer: Anne Wood
- Cinematography: Mike Callan; Brian Owens; Andy Martin; Derek Gruszeckyj
- Editors: Johnathan Bravo; Howard Dell; Gareth Maynard; Julia Weaver; Nigel Buck
- Running time: 10–25 minutes
- Production companies: Ragdoll Productions; Central Independent Television (1993–1995); Carlton UK Productions (1995–1998)

Original release
- Network: ITV
- Release: 4 January 1993 – 27 April 1998

Tots TV is a British children's television programme, produced by Ragdoll Productions and Central. The series was first telecast in the UK on the ITV network (part of CITV) from 4 January 1993 to 27 April 1998.

== Development ==
Tots TV was written by two of its puppeteers, Robin Stevens (Tom) and Andrew Davenport (Tiny).

The series was filmed on location in a small cottage, on farmland near Stratford-upon-Avon in Warwickshire. The cottage was purpose-built for the series in the early 1990s and after production ended in 1998, the property was abandoned. In the 2010s, the house drew public attention after being discovered by numerous urban explorers. In 2021, the house was destroyed by the landowners.

== Characters ==
The programme focuses on three puppets: Tilly, a French girl, with red hair, freckles and pale skin, who speaks in basic French (changed to English in French and Spanish broadcasts, and changed to Spanish in the US version), Tom, a blue-haired boy with glasses and dark skin, who is smart, and Tiny, the youngest Tot, who is smaller than the others and has green hair and pale skin. It also includes their pet Donkey who lives in a stable next to the Tots' secret house and a mischievous little dog named Furryboo that the Tots do not know about.

== Voices ==
- Tilly (played by three actresses – initially Véronique Déroulède, then Claire Carre and later Alexandra Hogg; María Moscardó in the US version).
- Tom (played by Robin Stevens; Mark Heenehan in the US version)
- Tiny (played by Andrew Davenport; Kevin Clash in the US version)

== Plots ==
=== Going out ===
Often (although not always), the Tots would go out to explore an everyday area in the real world. This often involved them helping out a young child, visiting Jane Pardoe at Whipsnade Wild Animal Park, and watching Jack the Gardener who was always placing surprise items in a field for children to play with. This also sometimes involved them using their magic bag which they always took with them, Tiny always carried it and Tilly always operated it. When asked to help, it would always produce some items to help them in the situation.

=== Staying in ===
In many other episodes, the Tots would do something in their secret house, including playing games and making exciting discoveries. Because the full titles featured the Tots leaving the house they were altered for such episodes. Often these episodes would feature one of the Tots reading the other two a story. These episodes always feature the reading Tot preparing to read using dolls of the characters in the story. Apparently, the other two were unaware they were preparing to read a story because they would always ring them up on their personal phone to ask if they wanted to listen to a story. This was despite the fact they all lived in the same house.

=== Other ===
If the episode was a full-length double-bill (regularly the first half with Jane Pardoe and the second half an adventure in the secret house) in the earlier episodes, they would be joined with a two-minute animation of a 'Noah's Ark' story (based on the toy "Noah's Ark in the Secret House") or an animation of a picture that a viewer had sent into the program.

== Recurring jokes ==
- Furryboo is always causing mischief or even helping the Tots out (one such moment was when he helped put the star on the top of their Christmas tree), but they never know he's there.
- When things go wrong or the Tots are just being silly, they call each other names like "Banana", "Sausage" and "Tomato".
- The Tots have telephones which signify their favourite colour with the same phone number of 12345, that they use to communicate with each other, even if they are only a small space away.

== Episodes ==
=== Series 1 ===
Episode No.	Title	Notes
1	Camel	Animal-themed episode
2	Beach	Outdoor / seaside theme
3	Fox	Animal-themed episode
4	Trains	Transport theme
5	Hedgehog	Animal-themed episode
6	Dress	Clothing theme
7	Woodlouse	Animal / insect theme
8	Cars	Transport theme
9	Dog	Animal-themed episode
10	Bike Ride	Outdoor activity
11	Owl	Animal-themed episode
12	Donkey Ride	Outdoor activity / animals
13	Horse	Animal-themed episode
14	Baby Party	Social event theme
15	Elephant	Animal-themed episode
16	Rockpool	Nature / seaside exploration
17	Giraffe	Animal-themed episode
18	Dentist	Health / visiting a dentist
19	Lemur	Animal-themed episode
20	Roller Skating	Outdoor activity
21	Snail	Animal / insect theme
22	Painting	Creative activity
23	Toad	Animal / amphibian theme
24	Camping	Outdoor activity
25	Peacock	Animal-themed episode
26	Bus Ride	Transport theme
27	Rabbit	Animal-themed episode
28	Garden Centre	Visiting a shop / plants
29	Worms	Nature theme
30	Window Cleaning	Everyday tasks
31	Penguin	Animal-themed episode
32	Kites	Outdoor activity
33	Goat	Animal-themed episode
34	Apple Picking	Seasonal outdoor activity
35	Kittens	Animal-themed episode
36	Playground	Outdoor play

=== Series 2 ===
Episode No.	Title	Notes
1	Fish	Animal / nature theme
2	Tiny’s Storybook: Little Car	Storybook segment featuring Tiny
3	Creative Play: Sound	Creative Play segment about sound
4	Parcels	Post and delivery theme
5	Eggs	Food / nature theme
6	Tilly’s Storybook: Imps – Toys	Storybook segment featuring Tilly
7	Creative Play: Bubbles	Creative Play segment
8	Funny Noises	Sound / play theme
9	Mountain	Outdoor theme
10	Tom’s Storybook: Teddy's Party	Storybook segment featuring Tom
11	Creative Play: Dressing Up	Creative Play segment
12	Mirror	Reflection / perception theme
13	Calves	Animal-themed episode
14	Tilly’s Storybook: Imps – Cake	Storybook segment featuring Tilly

=== Series 3 ===
Episode No.	Title	Notes
1	Band	Music-related episode
2	Tiny’s Storybook: Little Car at the Races	Storybook segment featuring Tiny
3	Sea Lions	Animal-themed episode
4	Three Little Pigs	Fairy-tale retelling
5	Flying	Transport / imaginative theme
6	Tiny’s Storybook: Martians – Snow	Storybook segment featuring Tiny
7	Duck	Animal-themed episode
8	Furry Beat	Music / rhythm theme
9	Doctor	Health / doctor visit theme
10	Tom’s Storybook: Mouse Chases	Storybook segment featuring Tom
11	Lost Ball	Problem-solving / play theme
12	King Tom	Imaginative play featuring Tom
13	Balloon	Outdoor / play theme
14	Tilly’s Storybook: Imps – Painting	Storybook segment featuring Tilly
15	Feelings	Emotional education theme
16	Inside Out	Exploration / perception theme
17	Leaf	Nature theme
18	Tiny’s Storybook: Cry Baby	Storybook segment featuring Tiny
19	Emergency Squad	Rescue / emergency theme
20	Watching	Observation / learning theme
21	Jelly	Food theme
22	Tom’s Storybook: Hungry Mouse	Storybook segment featuring Tom
23	Tinkle in the Woods	Nature / exploration
24	Bedtime	Daily routine theme
25	Cake	Food / cooking theme
26	Tilly’s Storybook: Agatha & The Paints	Storybook segment featuring Tilly
27	Lost Donkey	Animal / problem-solving theme
28	Tiny’s Storybook: Girl In A Red Dress	Storybook segment featuring Tiny
29	Ferris Wheel	Fairground / rides
30	Tom’s Storybook: Animal Concert	Storybook segment featuring Tom
31	Photo	Photography theme
32	Tilly’s Storybook: Mascots	Storybook segment featuring Tilly
33	Aeroplane	Transport theme
34	Where Shall We Live?	Homes / environments
35	Majorettes	Parade / music theme
36	Phone Diner	Communication theme
37	Indian Tree	Cultural / nature theme
38	Surfing	Water sport theme
39	Cowboy Town	Imaginative play / Western theme
40	Coming Home	Returning from a journey

=== Series 4 ===
Episode No.	Title	Notes
1	Middle of the Night	Night-time / routine
2	Shoe Shop	Visiting a shop
3	Police Car	Emergency / transport theme
4	Chinchilla	Animal-themed episode
5	Colour Circles	Art / colour learning
6	Postwoman	Jobs / community helper theme
7	Magic Hat	Magic / imagination
8	Street Lamps	Night-time / outdoors
9	What’s That Noise?	Listening / sound identification
10	Paper Boats	Craft / water play
11	Joking	Humour theme
12	Moving In	Home / milestone event
13	Smelling Day	Exploring senses
14	Melon Chase	Food / playful activity
15	Sleepy Day	Routine / rest theme
16	Hippo	Animal-themed episode
17	Treasure Map	Adventure / searching
18	Printing	Craft / creative activity
19	Magic Flute	Music / magical theme
20	Launderette	Everyday tasks / community places
21	Interfering	Social behaviour theme
22	Lost Teddy	Comfort object / problem-solving
23	Hamster	Animal-themed episode
24	Rainy Day (2)	Weather / indoor play
25	Glassworks	Visiting a workplace
26	Vegetable Guard	Gardening / nature
27	Iguana	Animal-themed episode
28	Muddy Footprints	Outdoor play / nature
29	Recorder Factory	Music / manufacturing
30	Adventure	General adventure-themed episode

== Telecast ==
The series was first telecast in the UK on the ITV network (part of CITV).

In the United States, the series was represented by Ragdoll's US representative, The Itsy Bitsy Entertainment Company. The series was redubbed with American voice actors, with Tilly speaking Spanish instead of French. The series debuted on PBS' PTV service in October 1996, initially with 40 episodes. The series would fulfill the Ready-to-Learn act. In October 1998, an additional 25 episodes were sold by Itsy Bitsy, and the series moved to PBS' weekday schedule, joining the Teletubbies.

In 2000, Discovery Kids broadcast the series throughout Central and South America, the Caribbean and the Falkland Islands. In Holland, the series is aired on Kindernet.

In April 2004, Ragdoll and Carlton International announced that they had secured a broadcast deal with the BBC to rebroadcast the series from that month, where it first aired on the CBeebies on BBC Two block as well as the CBeebies channel.

== Awards ==
The series won two BAFTA awards for its producer Anne Wood and director Vic Finch.

== Specials ==
A number of special episodes of the series were produced for both TV and VHS release, including a short series of episodes set in the USA, a 'Big Treasure Adventure' set on a pirate ship from England to Australia and several Christmas specials, including one filmed in Rovaniemi, Finland.

A series of educational Tots Video specials were originally released by Video Collection International in 1997 (later reprinted by Carlton in 2000) included hour-long episodes based on the alphabet, numbers, animals and basic French.

== Home media ==
=== VHS releases ===
Videotapes of the series were originally released by Video Collection International under their Central Video imprint from 1993 until 1994, and transitioned off to Carlton Home Entertainment afterward and later Granada Ventures.

- Year 1993: Camel and other stories (VC1299)

(Camel, Beach, Fox)

- Year 1993: Hedgehog and other stories (VC1300)

(Trains, Hedgehog, Dress)

- Year 1993: Owl and other stories (VC1303)

(Bike Ride, Owl, Donkey Ride)

- Year 1993: Peacock and other stories (VC1307)

(Peacock, Bus Ride, Rabbit)

- Year 1993: Elephant and other stories (VC1313)

(Horse, Baby Party, Elephant)

- Year 1993: Apple Picking and other stories (VC1315)

(Apple Picking, Kittens, Playground)

- Year 1994: Dog and other stories (VC1322)

(Woodlouse, Cars, Dog)

- Year 1994: Roller Skating and other stories (VC1323)

(Lemur, Roller Skating, Snail)

- Year 1994: Giraffe and other stories (VC1324)

(Rockpool, Giraffe, Dentist)

- Year 1994: Wiggly Worms and other stories (VC1325)

(How Does Your Garden Grow?, Wiggly Worms, Cleaning Windows)

- Year 1994: Windy Day and other stories (VC1327)

(Penguin, Windy Day, The Hungry Nanny Goat)

- Year 1994: Bumper Special: Bike Ride and other stories (VC1361)

(Dress, Bike Ride, Donkey Ride, Peacock, Cars, Dog)

- Year 1995: The Funny Noises Band and other stories (VC1384)

(Mountain Climbing, The Funny Noises Band, Tiny's Storybook (Little Red Car), Fluffy Little Chicks, Dressing Up, Bubbles)

- Out to Sea and other stories

(Splashing in the Pool, Hippo in the Garden, Colours, Out to Sea, Tiny's Storybook, Bananas, Parcels)

- Sticky Disasters and other stories

(Sticky Disasters, A Watery Surprise, Trouble in the Bathroom, Washing the Car, Blowing Bubbles, Big Banana Tom)

- Lost Teddy and other stories

(Lost Teddy, Lost Button, The Vegetable Nibbler, A Very Clever Monkey, The Disappearing Trousers, Cable Car, Where is That Phone?)

- Magical Secrets and other stories

(Magical Secrets, Tots In A Box, Magic In The Woods, Magic Balloons, Music Factory, Magical Night Time Garden, Secret Treasure Map)

- Bumper Special: Donkey Ride and other stories

(Donkey Ride, At the Airport, Tiny's Storybook, Undersea Adventure, It's Only Thunder, Safety on the Beach, Fun on the Beach, Donkey Cake, Watering the Garden, Ants, Naughty Little Fly, Melon Cheese, Rainy Day, Koala)

- Secret Magic Parcels and other stories

(The Secret Magic Parcels, Fishes, A Noisy Surprise, Tom's Storybook, Looking in the Mirror, Feeding the Calves)

- Fluffy Little Chicks and other stories

(Fluffy Little Chicks, It's a Cockerel, Milking a Cow, Raspberry Picking, Tom's Storybook, A Pool for the Ducks)

- Super Tiny and other stories

(Super Tiny, Laundrette, King of the Castle, Tom's Storybook, Naughty Mysterious Person, Iguana)

- Flying High and other stories

(Flying High, Tom's Storybook, The Village Band, Sticky Surprise, Tilly's Storybook, Sea Lions, Three Little Pigs, Doctor, Tiny's Storybook, A Special Party Cake)

- A Painting Surprise and other stories

(Lost In the Supermarket, Tilly's Storybook, Tiny Leaves Home, The Naughty Little Pig, A Sticky Mess, A Painting Surprise)

- The Runaway Horse and other stories

(The Runaway Horse, Tiny's Storybook, A Doughy Squeezy Surprise, Sausage Surprise, A Rainy Day, Sandcastles)

- The Lighthouse and other stories

(The Lighthouse, Party Time, Tom's Storybook, Blowing Games, Song Window, Flamingoes)

- Hopping Day and other stories

(Sheep, Boing Boing, Tilly's Storybook, All Fall Down, Naughty Old Ball, Hopping Day)

- Birthday Surprise and other stories

(Birthday Surprise, Dress, Peacock)

- Cuddly Bunnies and other stories

(Cuddly Bunnies, Splish Splash Splosh, New Shoes, Spring Cleaning, Chinchilla, Smart Day, Flower Friend)

- Naughty Puppies and other stories

(The Naughty Puppies, Tom's Storybook, Accidents Will Happen, The Dirty Old Boat, Watering the Garden, A Watery Surprise)

- Hamster and other stories

(The Happy Hamster, Squashed Donkey, Guide Dog, Animal Concert, The Funny Furry Otter, A Cat Called Brian, Zebras)

- Bumper Special: Penguin and other stories

(Penguin, Windy Day, The Hungry Nanny Goat, How Does Your Garden Grow, Wiggly Worms, Cleaning Windows)

- Wobbly Jellies and other stories

(Wobbly Jellies, Feeding the Ducks, Tom's Fast Food Takeaway, A Special Cake, Tom's Storybook, Baking Bread, Hippo)

- Bumper Special: Kittens and other stories

(Apple Picking, Kittens, Playground, Horse, Baby Party, Elephant)

- Dentist and other stories

(Dentist, Owl, Rockpool)

- Bumper Special: Camping and other stories

(Camping, Painting, Lovely Old Toad, The Big Wheel, Tom's Storybook, Balancing Surprise, Donkey Goes Missing, Paper Boats)

- Bumper Special: At the Beach and other stories

(At the Beach, Trains, Rockpool, Owl, Dentist, Hedgehog)

- Boing Boing and other stories

(Boing Boing, Lemur, Jumping Up and Down, Hopping Day)

- Naughty Little Pigs and other stories

(Naughty Little Pigs, Sheep, Feeding the Calves, Three Little Pigs)

- Tiny Leaves Home and other stories

(Tiny Leaves Home, Lost in the Supermarket, Dressing Up)

- Mountain Climbing and other stories

(Mountain Climbing, Tom's Storybook, Out to Sea)

- Bumper Special: Fox and other stories

(Fox, Roller-Skating, Camel, Giraffe, Snail, Woodlouse)

- Bubbles and other stories

(Bubbles, A Rainy Day, Splashing in the Pool, A Watery Surprise)

- Fishes and other stories

(Fishes, Tom's Storybook, Looking in the Mirror)

- Sing Song Adventures

(Furry Beat, Tom's Trumpet, Disco Machine, Grand Old Duke of York, Tom Sings La La La, Old McTom, Tilly's Flute)

- Snowy Adventure

(60-minute Special)

- Bedtime Stories

(Bedtime Stories, Bath, Far Away Star, Street Lamps, Night Time Teddy Adventure, Fun with Shadows, Time for Bed)

- Summer Holiday Adventures

(Afternoon Adventure, Watching the Dolphins, Building a Playhouse, The Loch Ness Monster, Jumping Kangaroos, King of the Castle, Little Boats Big Boats)

- Seaside Holiday Fun

(At the Beach, Donkey Ride, Rockpool)

- Zoo Animals

(Camel, Elephant, Giraffe)

- Furry Friends

(Little Kittens, Cuddly Bunnies, A Happy Dog)

=== Special VHS releases ===
In 1997, four special VHS tapes were originally released under the name Tots Video. The four titles were re-released by Carlton Video in 2000 with the same titles. The four titles were:

- Tilly, Tom and Tiny's A, B, C
- Tilly, Tom and Tiny's Animal Adventures
- Tilly, Tom and Tiny's Fun with French
- Tilly, Tom and Tiny's 1,2,3

=== DVD ===
- Birthday Surprise and other stories – (3 Episodes)
- The Adventures of Tilly, Tom And Tiny – (11 Episodes)
- Naughty Little Puppies and other stories – (6 Episodes)
- Snowy Adventure – (60 Minute Special + 2 Bonus Episodes)
