= Andrew Davenport =

English producer, writer and composer

- Born: 10 June 1965 (age 61); Folkestone, Kent, England
- Occupations: Writer; puppeteer; producer; music composer; actor

Andrew Davenport (born 10 June 1965) is an English writer, puppeteer, producer, composer, and actor, specialising in creating television, music, and books for young children. He is known as co-creator and writer of Teletubbies and writer, voice artist and puppeteer of "Tiny" on Tots TV. He is also the creator, writer, and composer of both In the Night Garden... produced by Ragdoll Limited and Moon and Me.

Davenport co-created Teletubbies (first broadcast in the UK in 1997) with Anne Wood, and wrote all of the 365 episodes. He created In the Night Garden... (first broadcast in the UK in 2007), wrote all of the 100 episodes 30-minute episodes, and composed the title theme and music for the series. In 2019, Davenport created Moon and Me. He wrote all 50 episodes and composed all the music for the series.

Davenport has been dubbed "the J. K. Rowling of the under fives" and "the king of kid's TV" following the Teletubbies and In the Night Garden.... His success with the preschool audience has been, as described by The Guardian's Tim Jonze, credited to "incredible instinct and a lot of painstaking research" and a "slightly terrifying insight into these unknowable little minds".

Davenport references child developmental science in the creation of his shows and has described his process as to "engage minds and feed imaginations with the unfailing power of characters and worlds forged with kindness and playfulness".

Davenport was recipient of the J.M. Barrie Award for Lifetime Achievement in 2025. He received this honour jointly with Anne Wood, for their outstanding contributions to children’s arts and television.

== Early life and education ==
Andrew Davenport was born in Folkestone, Kent and grew up in Bromley. He went to Hayes School where, at the age of 13, Davenport was inspired by Sir Jonathan Miller's TV series "The Body in Question" to be the first in his family to go to university, and to look for a subject that combined arts and sciences. Originally intent on a career as a speech therapist, he studied BSc Speech Sciences (vocational training for speech therapists) at University College London 1983–87. Davenport was President of the UCL Drama Society in his final year, during which the society staged 32 productions in 30 term weeks.

== Experimental theatre and performance career (1988–1994) ==
Davenport wrote and performed in experimental theatre between 1988 and 1994, with performing partner Kate France, whom he met at UCL. He frequently worked with conceptual performance artist Gary Stevens. Stevens later (along with Tim Whitnall and Toyah Willcox) sang the theme song for Teletubbies.

Davenport performed variously with France and Stevens at the Edinburgh and Brighton Festivals, London's ICA, Serpentine Gallery, Hayward Gallery, the British Art Show, National Review of Live Art, the Theatre de la Bastille in Paris, and the Yermolova Theatre in Moscow.

His dance performance in Mehdi Norowzian's short film Joy inspired the award-winning Guinness "Anticipation" advert, and became the subject of a landmark high court ruling in 1998.

Davenport also modelled for Gilbert & George's 1992 artwork Eyes.

== Children's television career (1991–present) ==
=== Ragdoll Productions (1991–2010) ===
In 1991, Davenport joined Ragdoll Productions as a puppeteer and co-writer on the double-BAFTA-winning series Tots TV, (first broadcast in the UK in 1993) puppeteering and voicing the character of Tiny. He co-wrote the series of 297 episodes with Tom's Puppeteer Robin Stevens. Anne Wood invited Davenport to join the company after seeing him perform in Gary Stevens' Animal at the CCA in Glasgow. Davenport went on to play a lead role in turning Ragdoll into a globally recognised, specialist preschool producer.

=== Brum (1994) ===
Davenport was writer and line producer on Series 2 of the series Brum, and appeared in two episodes as The Big Town Robber.

=== Teletubbies (1997–2001) ===
While he was writing for Tots TV, Davenport discussed with Anne Wood the viability of a show for a younger audience that was based on developmental rather than educational rationale. Davenport had been working on an idea for a set of characters based on spacemen, having noticed the toddler-like proportions and antics of astronauts in footage of the Moon landings. He was invited by Anne Wood to further develop the characters in response to an invitation from the BBC to pitch a new preschool show. Wood's invitation gave Davenport opportunity to draw heavily on the studies and theories of child development and language acquisition he was introduced to at UCL. The BBC stipulated that young children should appear in the show, so Davenport placed TVs in the Teletubbies' tummies to solve the scale difference between the 'monster'-size Teletubbies and young children.

In an interview with UCL's Alumnus magazine, Davenport said "There was a tendency for makers of children's TV to come from a teaching background, and the accepted form often involved a presenter/teacher leading a group of puppets/children in learning things. It seemed to me to portray a situation alien to the culture of the younger preschool child. [They] learn by self-motivated experimentation, establishing connections and patterns – by gradually assimilating rules and adapting them to accommodate new experiences. Television seemed uniquely well-equipped to address these processes."

Despite initial negative critical reception and scrutiny from developmental experts, Teletubbies became a widely recognized children’s television program. It received multiple industry awards and was broadcast in over 120 countries, with versions produced in numerous languages.

Davenport co-created Teletubbies with Anne Wood, and wrote all of the 365 x 25 minute episodes.

In 2002, Davenport wrote the BAFTA-winning series Teletubbies Everywhere (52 x 10 minutes). In September 2013, WildBrain acquired all rights to Teletubbies through its purchase of Ragdoll Worldwide, adding new characters and combining Davenport's original scripts with new writing.

=== In the Night Garden (2007–2009) ===
In the early 2000s, Davenport noticed that his friends' children had difficulty settling at bedtime. He created In the Night Garden... to give children a positive narrative around going to sleep. Davenport created the series and the characters, wrote all 100 episodes and composed music for all episodes of the double-BAFTA-winning In the Night Garden... (100 x 30 minutes).

=== Shine Group (2012–2014) ===
In 2012, Davenport joined Elisabeth Murdoch's Shine Group as head of a new pre-school content division. In 2014, Davenport and Shine incorporated Davenport's specialist pre-school content company, Foundling Bird.

=== Moon and Me (2019–2020) ===
Based on his love of popular toy-house stories from the mid 20th century by Rumer Godden and Enid Blyton, Davenport decided to create his own contemporary toy-house story. Davenport teamed up with the University of Sheffield to create a study of children's play, using a toy house equipped with cameras and microphones. This study revealed young children's "small world play" interests, including stairs, doorbells, and tea time. Davenport used the study to inform his development of Moon and Me, the story of a group of toy characters, brought to life by the Moon shining on their toy house.

Davenport rejects contemporary CGI effects and animation methods, instead insisting on filming with real objects using rod puppets, vast model sets, over 500 miniature props, and stop motion animation to create the series entirely at toy-house scale, and in-camera.

Davenport wrote all 50 episodes and composed all music for the series.

Moon and Me launched on CBeebies in 2019. It was co-produced by Davenport's company Foundling Bird and Bento Box Entertainment's Sutikki.

== Influences and writing style ==
Davenport's "absolute hero" and "big influence" is Oliver Postgate. Davenport has paid tribute to Postgate at the 2007 JM Barrie Awards, in a BBC documentary "Oliver Postgate: A Life in Small Films" and on Channel 4 News. At the beginning of every project, he re-watches DVDs of Postgate's programmes to connect himself to the mind of the child he was when he first saw them.

Davenport's work has focused on children's natural instinct to play, and how specifically tailored content can engage that instinct effectively. He draws heavily on the studies and theories of child development and language acquisition he was introduced to in his Speech Science degree at UCL. Davenport works from caravans and trailers on the sets of his show. He listens to directors and actors on set and as the crew become more proficient with the filming techniques, Davenport writes more intricate scenes.

Russell T Davies rates Davenport's writing style alongside Tom Stoppard and Samuel Beckett.

== Music composition ==
Davenport has been called "one of the most heard composers on the planet" after composing all music and lyrics for In the Night Garden... and Moon and Me, as well as writing the multi-platinum single Teletubbies Say "Eh-oh!" based on the series' theme song, which reached number 1 in the UK singles chart in December 1997 and remained in the Top 75 for 32 weeks, selling over a million copies.

His music has been performed by Michael Bublé (Davenport's "Silly Song" from Moon and Me) and the London Philharmonic Orchestra (In the Night Garden theme at the Royal Festival Hall). The theme for Moon and Me was also performed by the Chineke! Orchestra at the Royal Albert Hall for the CBeebies Prom at the 2019 BBC Proms.

Davenport invited Bublé to perform the song after seeing him sing the Igglepiggle song from In the Night Garden... on BBC Breakfast.

Davenport has said "Music is an emotional entity. It can deepen the experience of the child watching."

== Awards ==
- J.M. Barrie Lifetime Achievement Award – 2025 (jointly with Anne Wood)
- BAFTA In the Night Garden... – Best Pre-school Live Action Award 2007 and 2008
- BAFTA Teletubbies Everywhere – Best Pre-school Live Action Award 2002
- Royal Television Society Teletubbies – Best Pre-school and Infants Award 2000
- BAFTA Teletubbies – Best Pre-school Programme 1998
- 24th Japan Prize International Contest Teletubbies – Grand Prize-winner, Pre-school Education Category 1997
- Royal Television Society Teletubbies – Children's Entertainment Award 1997
- BAFTA Tots TV – Best Pre-school Programme 1996 and 1997

== Bibliography ==
- Davenport, Andrew (1995). Tilly Tom and Tiny and the Fly-Away-Painting Adventure ISBN 9780590131988
- Davenport, Andrew (1995). Tilly Tom and Tiny and the Night-Time Funny-Noise Adventure ISBN 9780590132008
- Davenport, Andrew (1995). Tilly Tom and Tiny and the Bouncy Bed-Up-In-The-Air Adventure ISBN 9780590131995
- Davenport, Andrew (1995). Tilly Tom and Tiny and the Never-Ending Rain Adventure ISBN 9780590132534
- Davenport, Andrew (2007). In the Night Garden...: All Aboard the Ninky Nonk! ISBN 1405903759, 978-1405903752
- Davenport, Andrew (2007). In the Night Garden...: Ooh, pretty flower! ISBN 1405903724, 9781405903721
- Davenport, Andrew (2007). In the Night Garden...: Tomblibloos: The Happy Waving Game ISBN 1405903910, 9781405903912
- Davenport, Andrew (2007). In the Night Garden...: Time to Wash Faces! ISBN 1405903929, 9781405903929
- Davenport, Andrew (2008). In the Night Garden...: Where is Iggle Piggle's Blanket? ISBN 1405904356, 978-1405904353
- Davenport, Andrew (2008). In the Night Garden...: What a funny noise! ISBN 1405904380, 9781405904384
- Davenport, Andrew (2008). In the Night Garden...: Upsy Daisy Loves the Ninky Nonk! ISBN 1405904364, 9781405904360
- Davenport, Andrew (2008). In the Night Garden...: Where are the Pontipines? ISBN 1856131947, 9781856131940
- Davenport, Andrew (2008). In the Night Garden...: Tomblibloo Trousers on the Ninky Nonk ISBN 1405904747, 9781405904742
- Davenport, Andrew (2008). In the Night Garden...: Too much Pinky Ponk Juice! ISBN 1405904372, 9781405904377
- Davenport, Andrew (2008). In the Night Garden...: Igglepiggle lost ISBN 1405904739, 9781405904735
- Davenport, Andrew (2008). In the Night Garden...: The Bouncy Jumping Game! ISBN 1405904135, 9781405904131
- Davenport, Andrew (2008). In the Night Garden...: Funny Noises! ISBN 1405904542, 9781405904544
- Davenport, Andrew (2008). In the Night Garden...: Upsy Daisy Wants to Sing ISBN 1405904143, 9781405904148
- Davenport, Andrew (2008). In the Night Garden...: Where is the Pinky Ponk Going? ISBN 1405904763, 9781405904766
- Davenport, Andrew (2008). In the Night Garden...: What a Noisy Pinky Ponk! ISBN 1405904828, 978-1405904827
- Davenport, Andrew (2008). In the Night Garden...: Bouncy Ball: An Amazing Musical Pop-Up Story ISBN 1405904909, 978-1405904902
- Davenport, Andrew (2010). In the Night Garden...: Nice and Quiet ISBN 1405906731, 9781405906739
- Davenport, Andrew (2011). In the Night Garden...: Snowy Day ISBN 140590819X, 978-1405908191
- Davenport, Andrew (2011). In the Night Garden...: Pinky Ponk Juice Everywhere! ISBN 1405907762, 978-1405907767
- Davenport, Andrew (2011). In the Night Garden...: A Lovely Present ISBN 1405907754, 978-1405907750
- Davenport, Andrew (2012). In the Night Garden...: Pontipines' Picnic ISBN 1405908521, 9781405908528
- Davenport, Andrew (2012). In the Night Garden...: Everybody Loves Christmas! ISBN 1405908645, 978-1405908641
- Davenport, Andrew (2013). In the Night Garden...: Wake Up, Igglepiggle ISBN 1405908998, 9781405908993
- Davenport, Andrew (2016). In the Night Garden...: Songs and Rhymes ISBN 0241268729, 978-0241268728
- Davenport, Andrew (2019). Moon and Me: The Little Seed: A classic bedtime story to read together ISBN 1407188526, 978-1407188522
- Davenport, Andrew (2019). Moon and Me: Tea Time! ISBN 1407188534, 978-1407188539
- Davenport, Andrew (2019). Moon and Me: Moon Baby Sticker Storybook ISBN 1407194291, 978-1407194295
- Davenport, Andrew (2020). Moon and Me: Hello Pepi Nana ISBN 1407198130, 978-1407198132
- Davenport, Andrew (2020). Moon and Me: Goodnight, Moon Baby ISBN 0702302112, 978-0702302114
- Davenport, Andrew (2020). Moon and Me: Onions! ISBN 0702302511, 978-0702302510
- Davenport, Andrew (2020). Moon and Me: Dear Moon Baby ISBN 1407198149, 978-1407198149
- Davenport, Andrew (2020). Moon and Me: Little Library ISBN 1407198165, 978-1407198163
- Davenport, Andrew (2020). Moon and Me: It's Christmas Time! ISBN 140719822X, 978-1407198224
