= Boohbah =

British children's television show

- Created by: Anne Wood
- Directed by: Chris Bernard; Annie Gibbs; Vic Finch
- Starring: Emma Insley; Alex Poulter; Cal Jaggers; Phil Hayes; Laura Pero
- Composer: Andrew McCrorie-Shand
- Country of origin: United Kingdom
- Original language: English
- No. of series: 2
- No. of episodes: 104

Production
- Producer: Anne Wood
- Running time: 20 minutes
- Production companies: Ragdoll Productions; GMTV

Original release
- Network: ITV; Nick Jr. UK
- Release: 14 April 2003 – 6 January 2006

Related
- Teletubbies; In the Night Garden...

Boohbah is a British preschool television series created by Anne Wood and produced by Wood's company, Ragdoll Productions, in association with GMTV. It premiered on ITV on 14 April 2003. The series was later broadcast on Nick Jr. UK beginning on 2 April 2005.

The series, with 104 episodes, was designed for preschoolers aged three to six (a slightly older age group than Wood's previous show, Teletubbies).

According to Anne Wood, the show's visuals were inspired by scientific photographs of microscopic life and cell structures. The main characters, the Boohbahs, are "atoms of energy" who sleep in charging pods. Every episode follows the Boohbahs performing a dance routine where the audience is encouraged to participate. The creators at Ragdoll Productions designed the show as an interactive "televisual game" with an emphasis on spatial awareness, motor skill development and puzzle solving.

== Characters ==
Episodes of Boohbah are divided into two main segments: one featuring the Boohbahs and another featuring the Storypeople.

=== Boohbahs ===
The series focuses on the Boohbahs, five colourful creatures who are described as "magical atoms" of energy. They are played by actors in full-body costumes. Their fur sparkles and shimmers with tiny lights, and they have big eyes and rows of lights for eyebrows. Each Boohbah is a different colour:

- Humbah, played by Emma Insley, is a yellow Boohbah.
- Zumbah, played by Alex Poulter, is a purple Boohbah.
- Zing Zing Zingbah, played by Cal Jaggers, is an orange Boohbah.
- Jumbah, played by Phil Hayes, is a blue Boohbah.
- Jingbah, played by Laura Pero, is a pink Boohbah.

=== Storypeople ===
The Storypeople are silent human characters whose actions are controlled by off-screen children using the magic word "Boohbah". Every episode of Boohbah includes a segment where the Storypeople are magically given a present. The Los Angeles Times called these segments "comic visual puzzles executed with vaudevillian flair."

- Grandmamma (Linda Kerr-Scott) – An elderly yet spry White woman. She has white banana hair and wears a dark pink housedress, pastel blue sweater, white socks, and red trainers.
- Grandpappa (Robin Stevens) – An elderly yet spry White man. He has white hair and a white moustache; he wears a long-sleeved yellow shirt, dark grey slacks, red braces, and white trainers.
- Mrs. Lady (Harvey Virdi) – An Indian woman. She has dark hair and wears a loose light blue blouse, loose bright pink trousers, and pink trainers.
- Mr. Man (Mark Ramsey) – A Black man. He wears a short-sleeved bright pink shirt, white trousers, and black trainers.
- Brother (Manuel Bravo) and Sister (Vee Vimolmal) – Always paired, they both appear to be in their late teens. Brother is a Spanish boy with short black hair; he wears a bright blue T-shirt, bright red knee-length shorts, and white trainers with pink laces. Sister is a Thai girl with hip-length black hair in a long ponytail; she wears a bright red T-shirt, bright blue capri pants, and white trainers with pink laces.
- Auntie (Sachi Kimura) – A Japanese woman. She has short black hair and wears a long-sleeved lavender blouse, black trousers, purple tights, and black shoes.
- Little Dog Fido (Dash) – A Jack Russell Terrier. He wears a red collar. He is the only character in Storyworld who is not wholly controlled by the magic word "Boohbah".

== Development and broadcast ==
Production of Boohbah began shortly after Ragdoll released a direct-to-video Teletubbies release titled Teletubbies Go! in 2001, which featured segments of the characters exercising. The high sales of the release led to Ragdoll's fear of obesity in children and what led the company to develop an exercise-based programme.

In November 2002, ITV's pre-school strand CITV and breakfast franchisee GMTV signed a five-year broadcast commitment deal with Ragdoll where both broadcasters would share weekday and weekend broadcasts of the series in the United Kingdom respectively. 104 episodes were planned to be split into two series, with the first airing in Spring 2003, and the second series being broadcast in 2004. On the same day, it was announced that Video Collection International, who had a long-time home video agreement with Ragdoll, would release the series on VHS and DVD in the country.

The series premiered as planned on ITV on 14 April 2003 and later debuted on GMTV's weekend pre-school slot at the same time. Ragdoll held worldwide distribution rights to the series.

In June 2003, Ragdoll announced their plans to launch Boohbah in the United States. They confirmed that PBS, Scholastic and Hasbro, the same companies who held the licenses to Teletubbies in the United States, had acquired TV, publishing and toy rights respectively. In the United Kingdom, the first DVD release: Boohbah Magic, was released on 26 May, and shot into the Children's Charts at No. 2. In October 2003, Ragdoll announced that Canal+ and the Australian Broadcasting Corporation had acquired French and Australian broadcast rights to the series, where the series would launch in January 2004 and Spring 2004 window in both regions. Ragdoll also announced that the show would premiere in the United States on PBS on 19 January 2004. In the same month, Hasbro signed a separate worldwide toy deal for the show except for the UK, Ireland, Americas and Asia.

In March 2004, Ragdoll announced that the second series would premiere in the UK on CITV on the 16th. In the same month, another VHS/DVD release – "Squeaky Socks", was announced to be released on 10 May. At MIPTV 2004 within the same month, Ragdoll announced more broadcast deals for the show. Treehouse TV acquired the series in English-speaking Canada and would begin airing on 26 April, complementing an earlier French-speaking deal with Société Radio-Canada. It was also announced that BabyTV in Israel and POGO in India were already broadcasting the series as well. Canal 13 in Chile and TV12 in Singapore also acquired the broadcast rights in their respective countries for broadcast later on in 2004. Another deal already announced was one with Viacom International, where Nickelodeon in the Netherlands and MTV in Belgium acquired the Dutch-speaking rights, where the show would air on the Nick Jr. blocks for both channels beginning on 5 April 2004. In October, Ragdoll pre-sold the series to Guangzhou Beauty in China for a launch within Chinese New Year 2005.

In March 2005, Nick Jr. UK acquired the UK pay-TV rights to the series, and the series would premiere on the channel on 2 April 2005. The programme became a regular fixture of the Nick Jr. UK schedule, airing seven days a week at 7:00 a.m. to start off Nick Jr.'s morning schedule. In July 2005, Ragdoll announced that the show would premiere on CCTV's Youth Channel in China on the 11th. SABC 2 was also announced to have acquired the South African broadcast rights, and would premiere the show in the country on the same day.

In the United States, the series was aired on PBS Kids from 19 January 2004 until 31 August 2008. It also aired on PBS Kids Sprout from 2005 to 2009, where it was shown as part of the programming blocks "Sprout Mornings" and "The Good Night Show".

== Episodes ==
Two series, each containing 52 episodes, were produced for a total of 104 episodes. Many episodes were written by Robin Stevens, who played Grandpappa on the show.

=== Series 1 ===
No.	Title	Written by
1	"Skipping Rope"	Alan Dapré
Come and bounce with the Boohbahs and do some funny folding. In Storyworld, Sister is skipping with a swirly skipping rope and soon everyone wants a turn. But can they all join in without getting in a twist? Countries: UK & Namibia; Leader of warm-up: Zumbah Storypeople: Brother and Sister, Mr Man, Mrs Lady, Grandmamma & Grandpappa
2	"Pearly Shells"	Alan Dapré
Tone up with some Boohbah twists, and have fun hiding in a line. In Storyworld, Brother and Sister find some shells on the seashore. Can they spot the special shells and winkle out what’s inside? Countries: Jamaica & Australia; Leader of warm-up: Jumbah Storypeople: Brother and Sister
3	"Rope and Rock"	Gary Winters and Gregg Whelan
Swing your arms and shape up with the Boohbahs and do the Push and Pull dance. In Storyworld, Grandmamma and Grandpappa discover a rope. Can they find out what is on the other end if they pull together? Countries: China & Russia; Leader of warm-up: Humbah Storypeople: Little Dog Fido, Grandmamma & Grandpappa
4	"Musical Pipe"	Robin Stevens
Keep fit with some quick Boohbah action, and join in with their whirly weaving. In Storyworld, Mrs Lady finds a musical pipe. The Storypeople take note and dance to her twirly tune. Countries: South Africa & France; Leader of warm-up: Zing Zing Zingbah Storypeople: Little Dog Fido, Mrs Lady, Brother and Sister, Mr Man & Grandpappa
5	"Windows"	Gary Winters and Gregg Whelan
6	"Armchair" "Comfy Armchair" (U.S. title)	Robin Stevens
7	"Record Player"	Gary Winters and Gregg Whelan
8	"Squeaky Socks"	Alan Dapré
9	"A Pile of Balls"	Gary Winters and Gregg Whelan
10	"Painting the Fence"	Gary Winters and Gregg Whelan
11	"Big Bass Drum"	Alan Dapré
12	"Hammock"	Alan Dapré
13	"Squeaky Seesaw"	Alan Dapré
14	"Jack-In-A-Box"	Alan Dapré
15	"Bubbles"	Gary Winters and Gregg Whelan
16	"Settee and Cushions" "Couch and Cushions" (U.S. title)	Gary Winters and Gregg Whelan
17	"Big Comb"	Gary Winters and Gregg Whelan
18	"The Big Ball"	Robin Stevens
19	"Yellow Woolly Jumper" "Yellow Woolly Sweater" (U.S. title)	Alan Dapré
20	"Musical Instruments"	Gary Winters and Gregg Whelan
21	"The Bed"	Gary Winters and Gregg Whelan
22	"The High Wall"	Gary Winters and Gregg Whelan
23	"Cakes and String"	Robin Stevens
24	"The Door"	Gary Winters and Gregg Whelan
25	"Building Blocks"	Gary Winters and Gregg Whelan
26	"Hot Dog"	Alan Dapré
27	"Treasure Chest"	Robin Stevens
28	"Flippers"	Alan Dapré
29	"Two Hats"	Alan Dapré
30	"Bells"	Alan Dapré
31	"Shed"	Gary Winters and Gregg Whelan
32	"Shining Armour"	Robin Stevens
33	"Flowers & Vase"	Alan Dapré
34	"A Big Bag"	Alan Dapré
35	"Piggy Bank"	Gary Winters and Gregg Whelan
36	"Drink of Milk"	Alan Dapré
37	"Leaky Hose"	Robin Stevens
38	"Parping Horn"	TBA
39	"Musical Cushions"	Gary Winters and Gregg Whelan
40	"Following the Signs"	Alan Dapré
41	"Puddle"	Gary Winters and Gregg Whelan
42	"Skittles" "Bowling Pins" (U.S. title)	Alan Dapré
43	"Pencil Sharpener"	Alan Dapré
44	"Cracker"	Alan Dapré
45	"Island"	Robin Stevens
46	"Collecting Mail"	Gary Winters and Gregg Whelan
47	"Tunnel"	Gary Winters and Gregg Whelan
48	"Necklace"	Alan Dapré
49	"Heavy Suitcase"	Robin Stevens
50	"Television"	Robin Stevens
51	"Long Drink"	Robin Stevens
52	"Fairground Thing"	Gary Winters and Gregg Whelan

=== Series 2 ===
No.	Title	Written by
53	"Big Switch"	Robin Stevens
54	"Bouncers"	Gary Winters and Gregg Whelan
55	"Beards"	Alan Dapré
56	"Paper Plane"	Gary Winters and Gregg Whelan
57	"Droopy Flowers"	Robin Stevens
58	"Fido's Flag"	Robin Stevens
59	"Sailing Boat"	Alan Dapré
60	"Gigantic Carrot"	Robin Stevens and Alan Dapré
61	"Stream"	Alan Dapré
62	"Feathers"	Robin Stevens
63	"Bat & Ball"	Gary Winters and Gregg Whelan
64	"Chair in the Air"	Robin Stevens
65	"Falling Oranges"	Gary Winters and Gregg Whelan
66	"Comfy Slippers"	Alan Dapré
67	"Ice Cream Cone"	Alan Dapré
68	"Banana Split"	Alan Dapré
69	"Pulling the Rope"	Alan Dapré
70	"Springy Sofa"	Gary Winters and Gregg Whelan
71	"Club & Ball"	Robin Stevens
72	"Hole in the Fence"	Gary Winters and Gregg Whelan
73	"Crossroads"	Robin Stevens
74	"Fido's Bone"	Gary Winters and Gregg Whelan
75	"Coloured Bricks"	Gary Winters and Gregg Whelan
76	"Glowing Lanterns"	Robin Stevens
77	"Little White Cloud"	Alan Dapré
78	"Stack of Cushions"	Robin Stevens
79	"Jigsaw"	Alan Dapré
80	"Stick"	Alan Dapré
81	"Flag"	Robin Stevens
82	"Four Jumpers"	Gary Winters and Gregg Whelan
83	"Snowshaker"	Robin Stevens
84	"Squirty Flower"	Robin Stevens
85	"Fido's Picture"	Alan Dapré
86	"Unwinding Carpet"	Alan Dapré
87	"Bouncy Castle"	Gary Winters and Gregg Whelan
88	"Wardrobe"	Alan Dapré
89	"Over the Net"	Alan Dapré
90	"Snowballs"	Gary Winters and Gregg Whelan
91	"Space Rocket"	Gary Winters and Gregg Whelan
92	"Sticky Wrapper"	TBA
93	"Jumping on the Balls"	TBA
94	"Sledge"	TBA
95	"Camera"	TBA
96	"Tightrope"	TBA
97	"Ball & Hoop"	TBA
98	"Little Rocky Boat"	TBA
99	"Flying Fish"	TBA
100	"Bucket & Spade"	TBA
101	"Umbrella"	Gary Winters and Gregg Whelan
102	"Snowman"	Gary Winters and Gregg Whelan
103	"Grass Skirt"	TBA
104	"Book"	Robin Stevens

== Reception ==
Ken Tucker, in his review for Entertainment Weekly, gave the show an "A−" score and commented, "I'm positive that Boohbah can be experienced by both its intended audience (kids ages 3 to 6) and its inevitable inadvertent audience (doting parents and stoners of every age) as a mind-blowing gas." Tucker joked that when Boohbah aired in America, it would prove more popular than The Price Is Right due to having more "flashing lights, blinding colors, and silly noise". Lorraine Ali, a senior writer for Newsweek, also gave Boohbah a positive review and wrote, "Move over, Barney, and make room for Zing Zing Zingbah." Common Sense Media gave Boohbah a rating of 3/5 stars, writing that its educational and fitness goals were "admirable", but that "the real test is whether or not the show works with your kid."

The New York Times Magazine commented that although the show's sequence of events "may sound incoherent ... the overall effect is mesmerizing, sometimes funny, even beautiful." The Boston Globe felt that the "segments featuring the Boohbahs are ploddingly slow, maddeningly repetitive, and without much purpose ... the live-action segments with real people are the only things worth watching." Slate was bemused by the show's segments and design, feeling that Boohbah was less effective than Anne Wood's previous show Teletubbies: "For all its earnest intentions, Boohbah lacks both the conceptual purity of Teletubbies and its sublimely silly sensibility." Cheat Sheet ranked the show first on their list of "5 Most Horrifying TV Shows That Aren't Supposed to Be Scary", criticising the characters' appearances, although crediting it for encouraging children to perform in physical exercise.

== Video games ==
There were multiple video games released underneath the Boohbah intellectual property.

Title	Platform	Release date
Boohbah, Welcome to the Boohzone	Online	2003
Boohbah: Wiggle and Giggle	Windows, Mac	2004
The Boohbah Zone	Online	2004
Boohbah Dance	Online	2004
