= Roland Rat =

- Roland Rat on TV-am, where he first rose to fame
- First appearance: The Shedvision Show; 1983
- Created by: David Claridge
- Voiced by: David Claridge

In-universe information
- Species: Rat
- Gender: Male
- Occupation: Superstar
- Family: Iris (mother); Freddy (father); Little Reggie (brother)
- Nationality: British

Roland Rat is a British television puppet character. He was created, operated and voiced by David Claridge, who had previously designed and operated Mooncat, a puppet in the Children's ITV television programme Get Up and Go!.

== Character summary ==
Roland lives beneath King's Cross railway station in The Ratcave and also in Ratcavetwo under the Hollywood Sign in Los Angeles. He has an infant brother called Little Reggie and had a relationship with a guinea pig called Glenis. His colleagues include dour Welsh technical whizz Errol the Hamster and over-enthusiastic self-appointed "number one ratfan" Kevin the Gerbil, who is from Leeds and loves pink buckets. Roland's car 'the Ratmobile' is a bright pink 1953 Ford Anglia.

Roland has a brash and confident personality, which writer Colin Bostock-Smith states was established by Claridge and writer Richard Curtis.

Claridge provides voices for all the main characters: Roland Rat, Errol the Hamster, Kevin The Gerbil, Little Reggie, Fergie the Ferret, and Roland's father Freddy, as they often appear on screen together.

== TV-am ==
Roland Rat was launched at TV-am by children's editor Anne Wood to give children entertainment during the Easter holidays. Roland first appeared on 1 April 1983 (Good Friday) on the ailing breakfast television network TV-am, and is generally regarded as its saviour, being described as "the only rat to join a sinking ship". After a couple of months on TV-am, Roland took the audience from 100,000 to 1.8 million.

Initially, Roland was featured as the host of The Shedvision Show, ostensibly broadcast from a wooden shack on the roof of TV-am's studios in Camden. On the strength of this, Roland was soon given a regular slot every morning introducing cartoons for younger viewers.

Roland Rat's time at TV-am lasted until summer 1985. During this period, Roland and friends would feature in a half-hour episode transmitted on school holiday weekdays on TV-am from 9:00 am. The school summer holidays of 1983 and 1984 saw Rat on the Road in which Roland and Kevin would spend each week in a different town of the United Kingdom. One notable highlight during this period was the visit of Austrian racing driver Roland Ratzenberger who appeared on the show in a motor race against the Ratmobile ending with Ratzenberger's car being sabotaged by his near-namesake.

The character of Errol the Hamster was gradually drafted in during the first year as a VT technician responsible for running the cartoons inserted into the show. Errol eventually joined Roland and Kevin on location at Christmas in 1983 for Roland's Winter Wonderland which saw Roland, Kevin and Errol enjoying a skiing holiday together in Switzerland. The following year at Easter, Roland Rat hosted the show Roland Goes East set in Kowloon, Hong Kong, and covering the ill-fated film shoot of Roland's attempted movie debut, a martial arts film entitled Enter the Rodent.

The half-term week of October 1984 saw Operation FOGI (Free Our Glenis Immediately) which revolved around the gang's attempts – eventually successful – to liberate Glenis The Guinea Pig from her life in the pets department of Harrods. Following enormous demand, the season was repeated across subsequent Sundays for the benefit of school pupils whose half term had not fallen the week of the series' transmission.

Christmas 1984 saw Roland's Countdown to Christmas. TV-am sold Roland Rat advent calendars, with Roland opening each door with the viewers at 7:20 am every day. The final door had Roland and his friends in the snow.

Roland's final appearance on TV-am was at the end of August 1985, when the last summer holiday slot was broadcast.

=== TV-am serials (selected) ===
- The Spectacular Shedvision Show (Easter 1983) – Set in a shed on the roof of the TV-am studios.
- Cartoon Time with Roland Rat (May half term 1983)
- Rat on the Road (Summer 1983) – Introduced Errol the Hamster in the final episode, although Roland had ordered him by walkie-talkie to "Run VT" whenever it was time for the cartoon to air previously.
- Roland's Winter Wonderland (Christmas holidays 1983) – Filmed in Switzerland
- Roland Goes East (Easter 1984) – Filmed in Hong Kong. Introduced Little Reggie
- Rat on the Road II (Summer 1984) – Featured Kevin's cover of Summer Holiday and Roland's cover of Love Me Tender.
- Operation FOGI (October half term 1984) – Introduced Glenis the Guinea Pig who was rescued from the pet department in Harrods as a result of Operation FOGI (Free Our Glenis Immediately).
- Roland's Countdown to Christmas (December 1984) – Featured Roland and friends singing a rewritten version of "The Twelve Days of Christmas" featuring such paraphernalia associated with the show as Kevin's pink bucket, Errol's favourite leek pie and a Roland Rat Superstar cap.
- Roland's Rat Race (Easter 1985) – A quiz show, featuring James Saxon as Roland's incompetent friend and conman D'Arcy De Farcey.
- The OWRRAS Summer Spectacular (Summer 1985) – This stood for Official Worldwide Roland Rat Appreciation Society. Broadcast in the summer of 1985, a studio based programme like The Spectacular Shedvision Show and the half-term series Roland Live. The last TV-am Roland Rat series.

== BBC ==
On 3 October 1985, he transferred to the BBC, for a three-year contract, which ended up being extended to six years. Roland said, "I saved TV-am and now I'm here to save the BBC."

Roland made a number of series during his time at the BBC, most notably Roland Rat the Series, a chat show set in Roland's sewer home, now converted into a high-tech media centre called the Ratcave. The show would intersperse the chat show segments with a storyline involving some sort of situation "behind the scenes".

These series also featured Roland's parents, Iris and Freddie, his pet flea Colin, Fergie the Ferret, Eric the Eagle, and his agent D'Arcy De Farcy. His ex-girlfriend Glenis was joined by another female character called Roxanne Rat.

The series purported to be broadcast from Roland's personal channel BBC3, complete with "THREE" ident spoofing BBC Two's "TWO" ident of the period.

Roland also made two spoof drama series, Tales of the Rodent Sherlock Holmes, in which he played Holmes with Kevin as Dr. Watson, and Ratman, a Batman spoof with Kevin as his sidekick, "Pink Bucket Man". During Christmas 1985, British Telecom operated a free "ratphone" number on 0800 800 800 where fans could listen to Roland's prerecorded Christmas message.

Roland would also host the children's game show entitled Roland's Rat Race, where child contestants answered general knowledge questions in a race car set.

== Channel Five ==
In the late 1990s, he made a series for Channel 5, called L.A. RAT, which featured Roland and friends living in Los Angeles.

== Other appearances ==
In 2003, Roland was a guest presenter for ITV's children's strand CITV.

Roland appeared on Big Brother several times, his first being 2004 in a task that involved the housemates playing a version of 20 questions in order to guess the identity of various celebrities.

In December 2007, Roland Rat appeared on a puppet special of The Weakest Link hosted by Anne Robinson which was originally broadcast on Friday 28 December 2007 at 18:00 GMT on BBC One. Roland reached the final round with Soo from The Sooty Show which went to sudden death after initially drawing with four points each. Roland ultimately lost out to Soo's superior wisdom in the tense final standoff. He previously appeared on a children’s television edition of the show in 2003, where he was the fourth contestant to be voted off.

Roland appeared in the fourth episode of the second series of Ashes to Ashes. This appearance was anachronistic, as the show is set in 1982 whereas Roland did not debut until the following year.

In 2008, Roland released a Christmas single, "Ding Dong Ding Dong (Christmas Down The Drain)" featuring Kevin, Errol and Reggie, available for download.

On 11 February 2010, whilst making an appearance on BBC's The One Show to answer a question about how children's programmes have changed over the years, Roland Rat spent so much time joking about the presenters (Adrian Chiles and Christine Bleakley) that Adrian ended the interview before he answered the question.

== Music ==
Between 1983 and 1985, Roland had three UK chart singles, two reached the top 40:

- Rat Rapping: 1983 Peak Position 14
- Love Me Tender: 1984 Peak Position 32
- No. 1 Rat Fan: 1985 Peak Position 72
- Roland Rat* – Living Legend was also released as a single but never charted.

Roland Rat also had two albums The Cassette of the Album. A cassette version of the recording, entitled The Album was released concurrently. The cassette recording claimed to be the LP recording, and vice versa; spoken word sketches at the starts and ends of the sides on both releases revealed this to have been the result of a mix-up which could not be rectified for financial reasons. Each of the main characters contributed a song: Kevin the Gerbil's were "My Roland" and "Pink Bucket Reggae", Reggie's song was "It's Great 'Ere, Innit", and Errol the Hamster contributed "Live Dangerously" and "Leeks Are Wonderful, Leeks Are Nice". Kevin the Gerbil also had a top 50 single with "Summer Holiday'.

In 1986, Roland’s second album - Living Legend - was released by BBC / Rodent Records. The album incorporated the theme tune and songs used in Roland Rat: The Series.

Tracks included a song from Colin, Roland’s pet flea, Kevin’s lost love, Linda, and a ditty from D'Arcey De Farcey about being bald. Roland also did a cover version of David Bowie’s “Fame”.

== Video game ==
In 1985, Ocean Software produced a game called Roland's Rat Race for the ZX Spectrum and Commodore 64. The player had to guide Roland through the sewers of London and collect nine pieces of a door which, when complete, would allow him to rescue his companions in time for an appearance on TV-am. Roland had to avoid enemies in the form of animated Wellington boots which could be temporarily incapacitated with a squirt of glue, which could also be used to stop tube trains in order to ride on them.

== Merchandise ==
Roland Rat merchandising was extensive and the Hasbro range of soft toys was hugely popular. Roland has appeared on hundreds of items ranging from toothbrushes to wallpaper, bedding, stationery, mugs, canned pasta, and children's glasses by Dolland and Aitchison.

A range of new merchandise in 2010 included a talking Roland Rat soft toy, fancy dress outfit, online game and a "team-up" with Asda's George Clothing to launch a new range of rat-themed clothing, including socks, T-shirts, underwear, and "superstar lounge pants".

== UK releases ==
VHS title	Release date	Video special
Roland Rat Superstar and Friends: Rat on the Road	1984	Roland, Kevin, and Errol read Roland's diary about how he and Kevin travel around Great Britain for six weeks to Cardiff, London, Edinburgh, Oxford, Newcastle, and York.
Roland Rat Superstar and Friends in Winter Wonderland	1984	Roland and his friends travel to Winter Wonderland in their hilarious adventure.
Roland Rat: The Series (BBCV 4165)	7 November 1988	Roland and his friends make TV stars on their hilarious BBC show.

- Thorn EMI (1984–1988)
- BBC Video (1988)
- Contender Entertainment Group (2003)
- Digital Classics DVD (2010)
