= Blips (TV series) =

British children's television series

- Genre: Children's
- Starring: Robin Stevens
- Narrated by: Patricia Routledge
- Composer: Paddy Kingsland
- Country of origin: United Kingdom
- Original language: English
- No. of series: 1
- No. of episodes: 26

Production
- Production company: Ragdoll Productions

Original release
- Network: ITV (CITV)
- Release: 29 September 2005 – 2006

Blips is a British comedy children's television series produced by Ragdoll Productions which was first broadcast on 29 September 2005. It starred Robin Stevens as Mr. Perfect and Patricia Routledge as the narrator. Its 26 episodes were written by Alan Dapré and Robin Stevens. Since 2009, the show has been difficult to find because it did not get a home media release; it is regarded as lost. The show features 3D-animated Blips (a group of purple blobs that wreak havoc in each episode) alongside the main protagonist, Mr Perfect.

== Plot ==
In every episode, Mr. Perfect aims to show viewers how to perform a task (such as serving ice cream or using exercise equipment) perfectly. Once the task is done, the Blips rewind the footage before the narrator can say he was perfect at the job and start all over again. This time, the Blips ruin Mr. Perfect's progress by setting traps or tampering with machines. After this, Mr. Perfect gives up on doing the task, and the show cuts to the credits, which show Mr. Perfect relaxing with a cup of tea and walking home.

=== Characters ===
==== Mr. Perfect ====
Portrayed by Robin Stevens, he is depicted as an everyman with an overly optimistic, goofy manner. He seems to be mute, using body language to communicate. His attire varies across each episode to fit the situation, but his main outfit consists of thick-framed glasses, tidy hair and a bright blue suit. Not much else is known about him. He lives in a white house where the Blips live.

==== The Blips ====
The Blips are purple alien-like beings that can take on various sizes and shapes. They live in Mr. Perfect’s house. A recurring comedic theme in the show is Mr. Perfect becoming suspicious of their existence because of the mishaps they cause but never actually encountering them.

== Broadcast ==
The first episode was broadcast on CITV in 2005. Until early 2009, reruns occurred spontaneously after the final episode was produced.

=== Episodes ===
1. Princess
2. Popstar
3. Knight
4. Cowboy
5. Cleaner
6. Gardener
7. Potter
8. Shopkeeper
9. Hairdresser
10. Movie Star
11. Car Washer
12. Artist
13. Cake Baker
14. Golfer
15. Waiter
16. Decorator
17. Keep Fit Instructor
18. Tailor
19. Ice Cream Maker
20. Builder
21. Hiker
22. Fashion Model
23. Shed Builder
24. Show Jumper
25. Detective
26. Pirate
