= Ragdoll Productions =

British television production company

Ragdoll Productions (UK) Limited
- Logo used since 2000
- Formerly: Ragdoll Productions (U.K.) Limited (1984; 1985–2000); Ragdoll Video Limited (1991–2000); Ragdoll Limited (2000–2013)
- Type: Private
- Industry: Television production
- Founded: 26 July 1984; 42 years ago
- Founder: Anne Wood
- Headquarters: Bloxham, Oxfordshire, England
- Key people: Christopher Wood
- Owner: Ragdoll Ltd.
- Subsidiaries: The Ragdoll Foundation
- Website: ragdoll.co.uk

Ragdoll Productions Limited, or simply Ragdoll, is a British television production company founded in 1984 by Anne Wood, who had previously worked for Yorkshire Television and TV-am. It is located in Bloxham, Oxfordshire, and has produced a number of children's programmes, most notably Teletubbies, Pob's Programme, Rosie and Jim, Brum, Boohbah, Tots TV, and In the Night Garden..., most of which are now owned by WildBrain.

== History ==
Ragdoll Productions was founded on 26 July 1984 by Anne Wood, who produced shows for the ITV network. It was incorporated as Ragdoll Productions (U.K.) Limited in April 1985 and was originally based in Birmingham. The company's first show, Pob's Programme, debuted on Channel 4 later that year. The company was later commissioned by Central Independent Television to produce Playbox, which demonstrated the ability for the company to produce their own characters. In 1989, The Magic Mirror and BOOM! marked the company's debut in live-action and animation markets. The company at first produced puppet-based programmes, and their mascot was originally a female rag doll that wore a chequered shirt with matching trousers, and black flats, and was also holding a candle in the earlier logos. The rag doll character was based on the one owned by Anne Wood's daughter.

In 1992, when Tots TV starting filming, the company moved their operations to Stratford-upon-Avon, Warwickshire, and opened up The Ragdoll Shop on 9 April of the next year.

In the mid-1990s, Ragdoll expanded operations to the United States, and signed a deal with The Itsy Bitsy Entertainment Company to sell all their programmes in the market.

On 1 June 2000, Ragdoll dropped their rag doll mascot for a more simplistic logo designed by Lambie-Nairn, with the company also adopting a new name of Ragdoll Limited by that point. During that time, the company started to move away from puppet-based shows (which started with Teletubbies in 1997), by making costume-based programmes and animated cartoons.

In October 2001, Ragdoll parted ways with Itsy Bitsy following a failure to reach an agreement with the company's majority owner, the Handleman Group. Ragdoll then started to sell their programmes on their own from then-on, renaming Ragdoll USA.

In January 2002, Teletubbies: Everywhere, a spin-off of Teletubbies, was announced to air on CBeebies within its launch debut. On 14 June, a new series titled Boohbah was announced and was pre-sold to CITV and GMTV for a 2003 delivery. The show later saw an international roll-out.

At MIPTV 2005, Ragdoll announced a new series titled Blurrfect and that CITV had acquired broadcasting rights for an autumn 2005 delivery. By September 2005, the series was renamed Blips, and soon premiered on 29 September 2005 as part of the CITV's autumn schedule. On 13 October, Ragdoll unrevealed two new series that were pre-sold to the BBC: In the Night Garden... and Tronji, for a 2007 delivery. In October 2005, Ragdoll subsidiary The Ragdoll Foundation announced that Five's Milkshake! block had commissioned a series of six short films titled What Makes Me Happy?, which would air daily from 19 December 2005.

In September 2006, Ragdoll formed a collaborative venture with BBC Worldwide called Ragdoll Worldwide, to sell and license the company's programmes outside of the UK and North America. In the Night Garden... and Tronji would be the first two programmes created as part of the venture, while existing programmes were handled by BBC Worldwide, which managed the international broadcast sales and the UK and international licensing of all Ragdoll properties (including Blips, Boohbah, Brum, Tots TV, Rosie & Jim, and Open a Door), with Ragdoll retaining all British broadcast rights. A new subsidiary, Ragdoll U.S.A. Inc., part of the new joint venture, would manage Ragdoll's distribution in North America.

In January 2013, Ragdoll opted to end their agreement with BBC Worldwide and put up Ragdoll Worldwide for sale. On 16 September 2013, Canadian studio DHX Media (currently named WildBrain) purchased the venture from both companies for £17.4 million (or US$24 million). The deal included the rights to most of Ragdoll's programming produced from 1990 to 2012. The company also changed to its current name of Ragdoll Productions (U.K.) Limited, with "Productions" added back to the name after 13 years.

In 2015, Ragdoll produced the live-action/stop-motion series Twirlywoos with DHX, making it the first and only co-production between the companies.

In 2018, the company co-produced a short film with Disney UK for the Hope Works initiative, titled What Shall We Do With The Angry Monster?.

In 2021, Ragdoll formed a deal with British distribution company Cake Entertainment for them to distribute their new series, B.O.T. & the Beasties, for CBeebies. On 29 March 2021, the company was relocated to Shenington, with Anne Wood resigning as a person with significant control of the company on 10 December 2021, and leaving her son Christopher Wood to take over as director.

On 13 June 2024, Ragdoll would once again move their operations, this time to Bloxham, another small town in Oxfordshire.

== Pre-Ragdoll productions ==
The following are some of productions made by Anne Wood before Ragdoll was founded, accompanied by a brief description and vital statistics:

- Puzzle Party - first broadcast in 1977. Hosted by Gyles Brandreth and featuring characters Gnigel and Gnu, the show was one of Anne Wood's earliest TV shows for the BBC.
- The Book Tower - first broadcast in 1979, hosted by Tom Baker and Stephen Moore.
- Ragdolly Anna - first broadcast in 1982, based on the children's books by Jean Kenward.
- Roland Rat - first broadcast in 1983.

Ragdoll's programmes produced between 1990 and 2017 (excluding Pob's Programme, Playbox and BOOM!) are currently owned by WildBrain (formerly known as DHX Media), the company no longer owns the rights of any of their shows.

=== Ragdoll Productions ===
Title	Year(s)	Network	Notes/Sources
Pob's Programme	1985–1990	Channel 4	Currently owned by Channel Four Television Corporation
Playbox	1987–1992	ITV (Central)	Currently owned by ITV Studios
The Magic Mirror	1989	ITV	Co-production for The Kellogg Company; Ragdoll's first animated production, but only they produced live-action sequences.
BOOM!	1990–1991	Channel 4	Ragdoll's first non-puppet live-action production Currently owned by Channel Four Television Corporation
Rosie and Jim	1990-2000	ITV (Central)	.
Brum	1991-1994, 2001–2002	BBC One (Children's BBC/CBBC); CBeebies	.
Tots TV	1993–1998	ITV (Central)	Co-produced with Carlton Television in later seasons Rights co-owned with ITV Studios
Open a Door	1994–2003	BBC Two (Children's BBC/CBBC); CBeebies	An international short film series co-produced with other companies.
Teletubbies	1997–2001	BBC Two (Children's BBC/CBBC)	.
Badjelly the Witch	2000	BBC One	Television special/movie Co-produced with Norma Farnes Management
Teletubbies Everywhere	2002	CBeebies	Short form series
Boohbah	2003–2006	ITV (CITV and GMTV)	Co-produced with GMTV
Blips	2005–2006	ITV (CITV)	Co-produced with CITV
What Makes Me Happy	2005	Five (Milkshake!)	Co-produced with The Ragdoll Foundation; Series of six short films
Twirlywoos	2015–2017	CBeebies	Co-produced with DHX Media
What Shall We Do With The Angry Monster?	2018	YouTube	Short film Co-produced for Disney UK
B.O.T. and the Beasties	2021	CBeebies	Short form series Distributed by Cake Entertainment

=== Ragdoll Worldwide ===
Title	Year(s)	Network	Notes/Sources
In the Night Garden...	2007–2009	CBeebies/BBC Two	
Tronji	2009–2010	CBBC	
Dipdap	2011	CBeebies	Short form series
The Adventures of Abney & Teal	2011–2012	CBeebies	

== The Ragdoll Shop ==
The Ragdoll Shop in Stratford-upon-Avon, Warwickshire, was a shop that consisted of themed play areas based on Ragdoll properties and an area where merchandise was sold. The shop first opened in 1992, and traded until 2005, because of expansion limits and failure to find a new larger venue.

The building that formerly housed the shop is now an optometrist's practice named Dr. C.P. Grey's. The picture of Rosie and Jim waving can still be seen in the black window at the top of the building.
