= The Book Tower =

British children's TV series (1979–1989)

- The Book Tower opening title featuring the tower of Sudbury Hall
- Created by: Anne Wood
- Starring: Tom Baker; Stephen Moore; Alun Armstrong; Neil Innes; Roger McGough; Bernard Bresslaw; Timmy Mallett
- Country of origin: United Kingdom
- Original language: English
- No. of series: 11

Production
- Producers: Anne Wood; Joy Whitby
- Running time: 24 minutes
- Production company: Yorkshire Television

Original release
- Network: ITV
- Release: 3 January 1979 – 16 May 1989

The Book Tower is a British television series for children, produced by Yorkshire Television, that ran for 11 series from 3 January 1979 to 16 May 1989.

Initially presented by Doctor Who star Tom Baker (1979–81), each episode explored one or more books, using dramatic presentations, with the aim of getting children interested in reading.

Later presenters included Stephen Moore (1982–83), Alun Armstrong (1984), Neil Innes (1985), Roger McGough (1986), and Bernard Bresslaw (1987). In 1988, each episode featured a different presenter, including Victoria Wood, Nick Wilton, Margi Clarke, Wincey Willis, and Timmy Mallett.

The theme tune, based on Paganini's 24th Caprice, was taken from Andrew Lloyd Webber's 1978 album Variations.

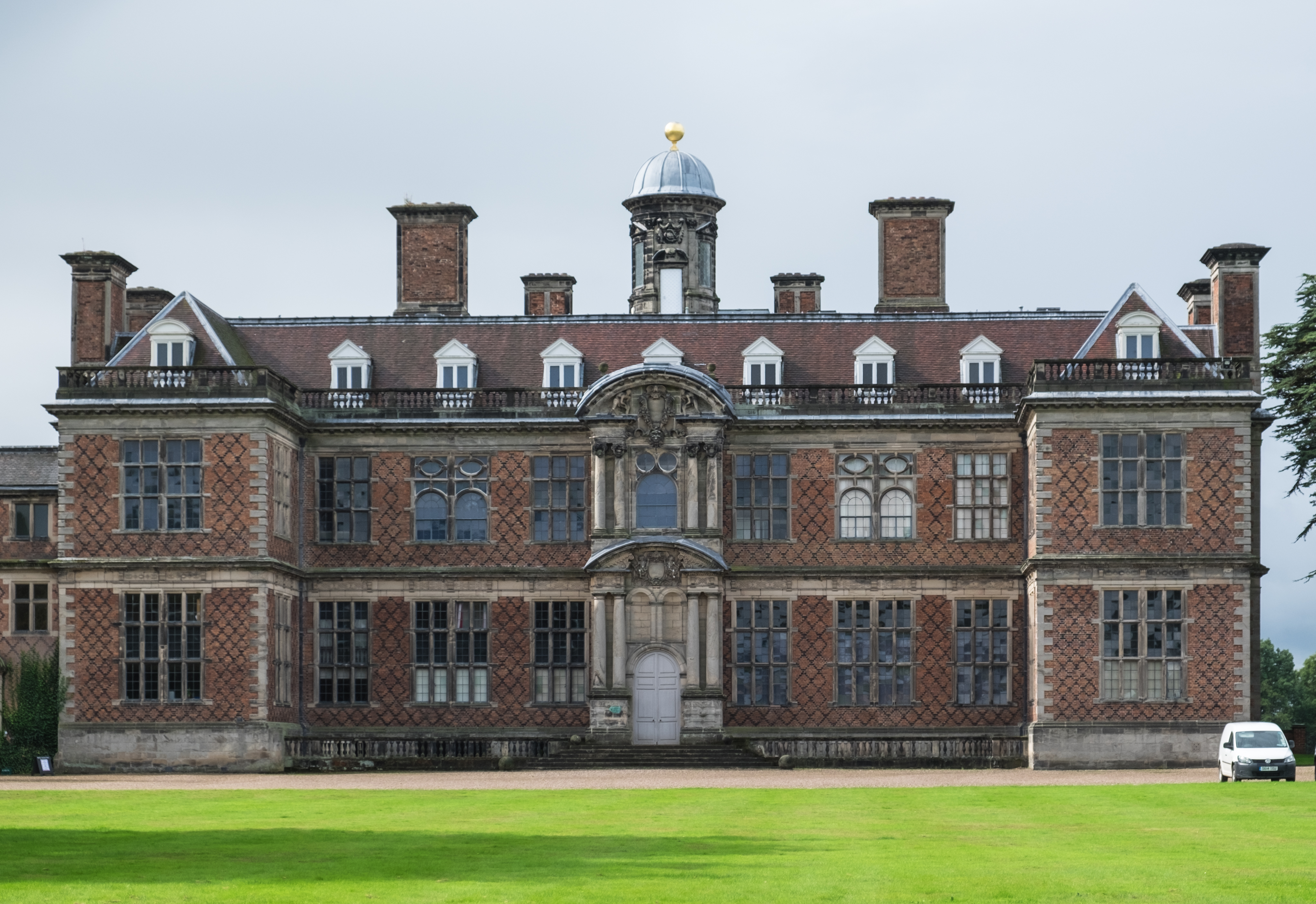
The opening title sequence featured Sudbury Hall in Derbyshire

The opening title sequence of the original TV series showed exterior shots of Sudbury Hall in Derbyshire, with the domed central cupola featured as the titular tower.

Since its original screening, the show has not been released on VHS, DVD, or any form of streaming media.
