= Ragdolly Anna =

- Based on: Ragdolly Anna series by Jean Kenward
- Directed by: Doug Wilcox (Series 1); John Taylor (Series 2 and 3)
- Starring: Pat Coombs; Michelle Davidson (Series 1 and 2); Caroline Berry (Series 3)
- Theme music composer: Allan Taylor
- Country of origin: United Kingdom
- No. of series: 3
- No. of episodes: 30

Production
- Producers: Anne Wood (Series 1); Joyce Taylor (Series 2 and 3)
- Running time: 10 minutes
- Production company: Yorkshire Television

Original release
- Network: ITV
- Release: 26 July 1982 – 13 July 1987

Ragdolly Anna was a British children's television series, produced by Yorkshire Television and based on the books by British writer Jean Kenward. The show was broadcast between July 26, 1982 and July 13, 1987 on the ITV network during its Watch It! (later Children's ITV) strand. The show starred Pat Coombs and was about a small stuffed doll named Ragdolly Anna (played by Michelle Davidson and later by Caroline Berry) that came to life.

The theme tune was by Allan Taylor

== International releases ==
- Kenya
  - KBC
- Germany
  - BFBS (Children's SSVC)
  - SSVC Television (Children's SSVC)
- Singapore
  - Mediacorp Channel 5 (Kids' Corner)
- Canada
  - Access Network
- Brunei
  - RTB
- United States
  - Public Access 31 (in Bedford, Indiana)
- New Zealand
  - TV One
  - Channel 2
- Portugal
  - Canal 1 (Brinca Brincando, a Canal 1/RTP1 children's block from 1987 to 1993)
