= Pob's Programme =

British children's television series (1985–1990)

- Genre: Slapstick
- Created by: Anne Wood
- Starring: Robin Stevens
- Country of origin: United Kingdom
- Original language: English
- No. of seasons: 2
- No. of episodes: 82

Production
- Running time: 25 minutes
- Production company: Ragdoll Productions Channel 4

Original release
- Network: Channel 4
- Release: 5 October 1985 – 5 September 1990

Pob's Programme was a children's television programme which was broadcast in the United Kingdom on Channel 4. The programme is presented by a puppet named Pob (played by a puppeter Robin Stevens), who speaks with a speech impediment and who supposedly lives inside the viewer's TV (the casing and red, green and blue electron guns visible behind him). Music was composed and performed by Mike Stanley. The opening titles of the show consist of the character breathing on the camera lens (this breathing was often mistaken for spitting, given the loud noise accompanying it and the thick condensation appearing on screen), and tracing his name in the condensation. Each week on the programme, a celebrity guest visits Pob's garden, and entertains him — though Pob and the guest never appear on screen together.

Pob's Programme was created by Doug Wilcox and Anne Wood of Ragdoll Productions, and was also Ragdoll's first show. Anne went on to create other programmes such as Rosie and Jim and Teletubbies. Unlike the other series by Ragdoll, it is one of the only programmes not to be acquired and picked up by DHX Media.

== Series overview ==
| Series | Episodes | Originally released | |
| Series | Episodes | First released | Last released |
|---|---|---|---|
| 1 | 52 | 5 October 1985 | 14 December 1986 |
| 2 | 30 | 19 July 1988 | 5 September 1990 |

== Content ==
In a typical episode, the celebrity visitor to the show finds a label attached to a piece of string on the gates of Pob's garden;

If in my programme you would be,
Wind the wool and follow me.
Follow where the wool is led first the Yellow then the Red

The celebrity guest then follows the woollen string, winding it as they go, and encountering a second label;

Wind it slowly, wind it fast,
A secret you will find at last.

Ultimately the wool is found to be Pob's unravelled jumper, and he is awoken to trace his name on the screen. Over the course of the programme, the celebrity guest reads a story, and solves a word puzzle with Pob.

Over 28 celebrity visitors appeared on Pob's Programme like Nigel Hayes, some appearing twice. The visitors, many of them well known as actors, included Roy Castle, Jan Francis, Charlie Williams, Madhur Jaffrey, Brian Blessed, Brian Patten, Hannah Gordon, Su Pollard, Kathy Staff, John Duttine, Ross Davidson, Spike Milligan, Toyah Willcox. Bill Pertwee, Anni Domingo, Josette Simon, Tony Armatrading, Rupert Frazer, Kjartan Poskitt, Bernard Hepton, Peter Howitt, Cheryl Campbell, Susan Gilmore, Pat Coombs and Patricia Hodge. One episode was filmed on location at Birmingham Children's Hospital with Barry Foy as a patient.

Various celebrities had recurring segments on Pob's Programme, including Nigel Kennedy (who would attempt to teach Pob to play the violin), Dick King-Smith (who would follow nature trails based on clues that Pob would send him), Alan Dart (who would be seen, hands only, doing a different handicraft project each episode) and Rod Campbell (who would devise different ways to open a mystery box).

Pob was often accompanied in his mischief by a silent teddy bear called Teddy, operated by Bob Berk and Wanda Szajna-Hopgood.

== Recognition ==
In 2001, Pob's Programme was number 59 on Channel 4's 100 Greatest Kids' TV shows.
