= In the Night Garden... =

British children's television series

- Created by: Andrew Davenport
- Developed by: Anne Wood; Andrew Davenport
- Starring: Holly Denoon; Rebecca Hyland; Nick Kellington; Andy Wareham; Elisa Laghi; Justyn Towler; Isaac Blake
- Narrated by: Derek Jacobi
- Composer: Andrew Davenport
- Country of origin: United Kingdom
- Original language: English
- No. of series: 2
- No. of episodes: 100 (list of episodes)

Production
- Producers: Anne Wood; Andrew Davenport
- Running time: 28 minutes approx
- Production companies: Ragdoll Productions; BBC Worldwide

Original release
- Network: CBeebies; BBC Two
- Release: 19 March 2007 – 6 March 2009

Related
- Teletubbies; Rosie and Jim

In the Night Garden... is a British preschool children's television series created, written and composed by Teletubbies co-creator Andrew Davenport for CBeebies and BBC Two and produced by Ragdoll Worldwide, a joint venture of Ragdoll Productions and BBC Worldwide. The show was aimed at children aged from one to six years old. The programme is narrated by Derek Jacobi. It is filmed in live action and features a mix of actors in costume, stop motion, puppetry and CGI animation.

== Production ==
Andrew Davenport stated in an interview with The Guardian that the key inspiration for the series was his own dream world as a child. This started coming into place in 2004 when Davenport created sketches for the characters of Igglepiggle, Upsy Daisy and Makka Pakka. The series would go on to be publicly announced a year later, and filming would eventually start in March 2005.

Chroma key sets would be constructed for use on the show. Backdrops would be used as well and would come in the form of a modified video of an actual forest. The show was filmed at Smatchley Wood, a private forest located in Warwickshire, England. Hundreds of props would be built too: the majority were spherical flowers resembling pom-poms as well as several types of oversized oval-shaped stones.

The constant usage of gigantic inflatable structures, hundreds of props, expensive chroma key, heavy costumes and radio controlled vehicles meant for an estimated amount of £145,000 per episode.

== Overview ==
The show features a large cast of colourful characters with unusual names who live in a magical forest scattered with large daisies and brightly coloured flowers. The characters mostly speak short and repetitive phrases and each one has its special song and dance. The garden is a sunny and colourful environment and the music is jaunty and music box-like. According to Wood:

We wanted to explore the difference between being asleep and being awake from a child's point of view: the difference between closing your eyes and pretending to be asleep and closing your eyes and sleeping.

Each episode starts with a shot of a night sky with the stars appearing, followed by a shot of a child in bed while the narrator introduces the programme's episode. The scene then cuts to Igglepiggle in his boat, getting ready to travel to the Night Garden whilst the theme music plays. The camera pans up to the night sky, followed by brightly coloured flowers. Then, we see Igglepiggle going to the gazebo to meet his friends. Afterwards, the title appears on a bush, and either the Ninky Nonk or the Pinky Ponk appears.

The episodes end with the Tittifers singing their song, and then one character gets ready to go to sleep. At the same time, they hear a bedtime story, which is generated by the magical gazebo that sits at the centre of the Night Garden. This story is a summary of the plot of the episode. Sometimes, the characters all dance together under the Gazebo. Then, we see all the characters except for Igglepiggle going to sleep while Igglepiggle delivers his goodbye sequence. Then, the theme music plays as the Night Garden turns and retreats into the night sky, and Igglepiggle is seen asleep on his boat as the end credits roll over.

In the Night Garden... is intended to help children relax and achieve calming relationships with their parents. Producer Anne Wood also states, "We became very aware of the anxiety surrounding the care of young children which manifested itself in all kinds of directions, but the one big subject that came up, again and again, was bedtime. It's the classical time for tension between children who want to stay up and parents who want them to go to bed. So this is a programme about calming things down whereas most children's TV is about getting everything up."

In 2007 and 2008, the show won the Children's BAFTA for "Pre-School Live-Action;" it was also nominated for the award in 2009.

== Characters ==
- The Narrator (voiced by Derek Jacobi) is a voice who can often be heard describing the day-to-day activities of the Night Garden as they happen. Though they never physically appear in the show, all the other inhabitants of the Night Garden are aware of them and will usually respond whenever they speak to them. They are featured in every episode. They tell the characters what to do and sing along to a character's song when they're introduced into the episode.
- Igglepiggle (played by Nick Kellington) is a blue teddy bear-like creature with a bean-shaped head, a doll-like nose, a sideways red mohawk and average-sized legs. He always carries his red blanket and tends to fall flat on his back when surprised. He is the main character of the show but not featured in all episodes. He arrives in the Night Garden at the beginning of each episode and leaves the Night Garden at the end of each episode in a boat-like bed for himself, for which the blanket doubles and serves as a sail. Igglepiggle does not speak, but he has a bell in his left foot, a squeaker in his tummy and a rattle in his hands. His best friends in the garden are Upsy Daisy, Makka Pakka and the Tombliboos. He is the only character to walk on the Stepping Stone Path and in the Garden and the only character to ride in two carriages of the Ninky Nonk. He sleeps on his boat. Igglepiggle is not a full-time resident of the Garden but a visitor; the garden exists in Igglepiggle's dream.
- Upsy Daisy (played by Rebecca Hyland) is a rag doll-like creature, with a brown skin colour, a chime in her tummy and brightly coloured clothes. She likes walking through the Garden and blowing kisses to the other characters or the audience. She often hugs and kisses other characters, particularly Igglepiggle. Her catchphrases are "Upsy Daisy", the more emphatic "Daisy Doo!" and additionally "Pip pip onk onk!", which is her way of saying goodbye. Her hair stands on end when excited or surprised and her skirt inflates to a tutu when she dances or pulls the ripcord on her waist. Upsy Daisy loves to sing, especially through her megaphone. Usually, when she kisses Igglepiggle, Igglepiggle kisses back. In Davenport's earliest sketch of the character, her face was more of a flower-like shape.
- Makka Pakka (played by Justyn Towler) is a beige, small, doll-like creature. He has three rounded protuberances on his head, ears and tail to represent stones that he uses to make piles. He lives in a rock cave and likes cleaning things, such as his collection of stacking stones and the other characters' faces. He often stacks freshly cleaned stones into piles resembling his head and body. He sleeps in and on a brightly coloured sleeping stone bag bed, often cuddling a stone as a toy. He travels around the garden with his trolley, the Og-Pog, which carries: his sponge, soap, red/orange trumpet and a bellows-like apparatus device called "the Uff-Uff" which he uses to dry items after cleaning them. His house is approached by a stone-walled ditch, as his home is half-buried in the ground.
- The Tombliboos are a trio of three cute doll-like creatures who are all dressed in costumes with stripes and spots: red and green, brown and pink and pink and yellow. Their names phonetically reflect how a young child might count to 3 and the Tombliboos always appear in this order by saying their names. They live among the branches of a bush, playing on a series of platforms connected by stairs and chutes; the platforms occasionally tilt when the Tombliboos jump on them as seen in "The Tombliboos Clean Their Teeth". The Tombliboos enjoy playing the drums and the piano, and they also play with large building blocks. When the Tombliboos feel sad, they play "sad" music on their piano. Their trousers (which fall down unexpectedly) are often seen hanging on the washing line outside their home and they usually take them down from the line and wear them before going out. They are sometimes seen brushing their teeth before bed. The Tombliboos enjoy kissing each other whilst cuddling and reciting their names.
- The Pontipines (red) and The Wottingers (blue) are ten tiny wooden figurine doll-like families (a mother and a father plus four boys and four girls). They have high-pitched voices and live in a semi-detached house at the foot of a tree. The Pontipines appear in most episodes, while the Wottingers' appearances are rare, although they are featured more in Series 2. Mr. Pontipine wears a self-adhesive fake moustache which, in the case of one episode, has an unorthodox tendency of flying off and attaching itself to places around the garden. Mrs. Pontipine carries a pair of binoculars to keep an eye on their children.
- The Haahoos are five latex pillow or balloon-like creatures who roam about the garden at a leisurely pace. The purple Haahoo is shaped like a jellybean or stemless pear decorated with yellow flowers. The blue Haahoo has cyan spots with red outlines, and it is shaped like the letter X. The orange Haahoo is shaped like a flower, with multi-coloured petals. The yellow Haahoo with red, orange and blue spots is shaped like a star. The red and blue/checkered Haahoo is ball-shaped, with checkered red and blue/white diamonds. The Haahoos appear in the main body of an episode as 10 ft inflatables, but behind the gazebo during general dance sequences as CGI replicas. They are also seen going to sleep, closing their eyes and deflating slightly. They make boinging and squishing noises when moving. The Haahoos are held by wires to keep them standing upright.
- The Tittifers are a bunch of animated tropical birds with unique songs. There are four small blue tittifers (rufous-crowned laughingthrushes), three larger pink ones (hoopoes), two big green ones (white-cheeked turacos) and one Channel-billed toucan.
- The Ninky Nonk is a trackless train with five differently sized and shaped carriages. Its size is non-Euclidean: exterior shots of the moving Ninky Nonk show a toy-sized train, quite small compared to the main characters and scenery, while interiors and static exterior shots are done on sets or with life-sized models so that the characters can easily fit inside. When it is moving, the seat-belted passengers jerk sharply in their seats. Bells and green lights warn everyone inside when the Ninky Nonk is ready to leave or when it is stopping. The Ninky Nonk can stop on hills and can stop in a straight line. It also stops outside the character's houses sometimes (mostly for the Pontipines and Tombliboos). It is also able to drive up and down trees and upside-down along branches (albeit mostly for the Pontipines and Wottingers) and also round and round the branches on occasion. The engine is banana-shaped with a green flashing light on top and is followed by a green spheroidal carriage used by the Tombliboos and Makka Pakka, a tiny house-like carriage used by the Pontipines and Wottingers, a blue rectangular carriage used by Upsy Daisy and Igglepiggle when he is travelling with Upsy Daisy, and a tall, rounded single-seater carriage used by Igglepiggle when he is travelling alone. All the carriages have lights on top that flash in sequence when the Ninky Nonk is stationary.
- The Pinky Ponk is a zeppelin which glides in the air, providing aerial views of the garden for all those on board. It is coloured a bright turquoise and is decorated with an abundance of pink, orange and yellow speckles on each side. The "cockpit" contains multiple small tables with Pinky Ponk juice for each character to drink on their journey and are surrounded by small stones acting as stools. at the front is a huge window for them to look out of and enjoy the spectacular views of the Night Garden.

== Episodes ==
Series	Episodes	Originally released	
Series	Episodes	First released	Last released
1	55	19 March 2007	14 March 2008
2	45	1 September 2008	6 March 2009

=== Gazebo Problem Solving Pictures ===
In some episodes, when a problem needs solving, the gazebo spins and chooses a picture until it finds one associated to a solution that will solve the problem.

- "Episode 8: Igglepiggle's Blanket in Makka Pakka's Ditch" – Igglepiggle's Blanket and Makka Pakka Blowing His Trumpet.
- "Episode 9: The Ninky Nonk Wants a Kiss" – All 6 things that Upsy Daisy kissed, then it finally ends with the Ninky Nonk, to tell Upsy Daisy that the Ninky Nonk wanted a kiss. This is the only episode where the gazebo lands on a picture more than once.
- "Episode 16: Igglepiggle's Mucky Patch". – Makka Pakka.
- "Episode 35: The Pontipines Find Igglepiggle's Blanket" – The Pontipines.
- "Episode 36: Igglepiggle's Accident" – Makka Pakka.
- "Episode 51: Where's Your Uff-Uff Makka Pakka? – Makka Pakka with his Uff-Uff.
- "Episode 54: Tombliboo Eee Gets Lost" – Tombliboo Eee and Upsy Daisy's megaphone.
- "Episode 67: Makka Pakka's Piles of Three" – Makka Pakka.
- "Episode 75: Make Up Your Mind Upsy Daisy" – Igglepiggle.
- "Episode 78: What Loud Music, Tombliboos!" – Upsy Daisy's megaphone and Makka Pakka's trumpet together.
- "Episode 81: Where Did Makka Pakka's Sponge Go?" – Makka Pakka with his sponge.
- "Episode 86: Sad and Happy Tombliboos" – The Tombliboos' drums.

== Cast ==
- Derek Jacobi as Narrator
- Nick Kellington as Igglepiggle
- Rebecca Hyland as Upsy Daisy
- Justyn Towler as Makka Pakka
- Andy Wareham as Tombliboo Unn
- Isaac Blake (Series 1)/Holly Denoon (Series 2) as Tombliboo Ooo
- Elisa Laghi as Tombliboo Eee

== Critics ==
One parent petitioner was quoted by The Daily Telegraph commenting: "My four-year-old refused to believe it was bedtime because In the Night Garden... hadn't been on and it was daylight outside.", this is because the show was removed from CBeebies' Bedtime Hour for a while in 2008.

== Telecast and home media ==
In the United Kingdom, In the Night Garden... debuted on 19 March 2007 and aired its final episode on 6 March 2009. From 23 April until 10 June 2007, the show took a break from airing on the CBeebies channel although repeats were still shown on BBC Two. From 11 June 2007 until 28 March 2008, the show aired on the CBeebies channel every day, including weekends, at 6:25pm in the "Bedtime Hour" slot, in addition to earlier 11am showings on BBC Two on weekday mornings.

From 29 March until 29 August 2008, In The Night Garden... was removed from its 6:25pm "Bedtime Hour" slot, which resulted in a nationwide fan petition outside the BBC's Television Centre studios asking for the programme to be re-instated to its normal slot. The show returned to the daily "Bedtime Hour" slot at 6.20 pm as of 30 August 2008 and began showing the second series (beginning with "Slow Down Everybody") on 1 September 2008. The show was also shown on BBC HD from 3 November 2008 to 22 December 2009.

From 3 January until 4 September 2009, the show was moved to a 6:00pm transmission time but was retained in the "Bedtime Hour" slot. From 5 September 2009 onwards; to this day, the show remains in the 6:20pm slot and is traditionally the last full-length programme of the day before the bedtime story segment. From 9 January until 29 August 2010, the show was shown on weekends at the earlier time 1:20pm because of this, the 2:30pm "Discover and Do" slot was reduced to 11:00am from 11 January to 3 September 2010. From 6 September 2010 onwards, the show was removed from its 11:00am "Discover and Do" slot, once again reduced to the 6:20pm "Bedtime Hour" slot, it was also the last programme shown in the mornings on BBC Two from 2007-2012.

=== DVDs ===
Several Region 2 DVDs have been released in the United Kingdom by BBC Worldwide (initially through BBC Children's DVD and then through 2 Entertain) from September 2007 to May 2012 and Abbey Home Media from 2014 to 2017:

List of DVDS	Episodes
Who's Here? (10 September 2007)	Makka Pakka Washes Faces The Tombliboos’ Waving Game Everybody All Aboard the Ninky Nonk The Prettiest Flower Makka Pakka's Trumpet Makes a Funny Noise
Hello Igglepiggle! (5 November 2007)	IgglePiggle's Blanket in Makka Pakka's Ditch IgglePiggle's Blanket Walks About by Itself IgglePiggle’s Mucky Patch The Pinky Ponk Adventure Jumping for Everybody
Hello Upsy Daisy! (18 February 2008)	Quiet, Please, Tombliboos! Upsy Daisy Wants to Sing! Upsy Daisy Kisses Everything! Upsy Daisy's Big, Loud Sing-Song IgglePiggle Looks for Upsy Daisy and Follows Her Bed The Ninky Nonk Wants a Kiss
Hello Makka Pakka! (19 May 2008)	Makka Pakka's Stone Concert; Makka Pakka's Present; Runaway Og-Pog! Washing the Haahoos; Makka Pakka Gets Lost!
Hello Tombliboos! (8 September 2008)	Too Loud Tombliboos! Nice and Quiet! The Tombliboos' Busy Day; Tombliboo Trousers; Tombliboo Ooo Drinks Everyone Else’s Pinky Ponk Juice; The Tombliboo Tower of 5
Isn't That a Pip? (3 November 2008)	The Pontipine Children on the Roof; Looking For Each Other; Slow Down Everybody! Igglepiggle Goes Visiting; Where is the Pinky Ponk Going?
Look at That! (23 March 2009)	Igglepiggle's Tiddle; Makka Pakka's Piles of Three; Where are the Wottingers? Mr. Pontipine's Moustache Flies Away; What Loud Music, Tombliboos!
What Fun! (2 November 2009)	Sneezing; Hide and Seek; Mind the Haahoos; The Pontipines Find Igglepiggle's Blanket; Upsy Daisy Dances with the Pinky Ponk
All Together! (15 March 2010)	Waving from the Ninky Nonk; Playing Hiding with Makka Pakka; Wake Up Ball; Over and Under; Sad and Happy Tombliboos!
Best Friends! (6 September 2010)	Upsy Daisy's Tiring Walk; Trubliphone Fun; Shshsh! Upsy Daisy's Having a Rest! Who’s Next on The Pinky Ponk? Makka Pakka's Circle of Friends
All Aboard! (6 June 2011)	Ninky Nonk Or Pinky Ponk? Upsy Daisy's Special Stone; Ninky Nonk Dinner Swap; The Tombliboos Swap Trousers; Igglepiggle's Accident
Out For A Walk! (5 September 2011)	Upsy Daisy's Funny Bed; The Ball; Wave to the Wottingers! The Pontipines in Upsy Daisy’s Bed; Igglepiggle's Noisy Noises.
What Lovely Music! (28 May 2012)	Tombliboo Eee Gets Lost! Make Up Your Mind Upsy Daisy! Following; Upsy Daisy Dances With The Haahoos; Long Distance Ball Game
Wake Up Igglepiggle! (7 April 2014)	Wake Up Igglepiggle; Where Can Igglepiggle Have A Rest? Oh Look It's The Wottingers! Dinner In The Ninky Nonk; The Tombliboos Clean Their Teeth

The boxset Hello Everybody! (24 November 2008) includes "Hello Igglepiggle", "Hello Upsy Daisy", "Hello Makka Pakka" & "Hello Tombliboos"

== Awards and nominations ==
- BAFTA Children's Awards 2007
  - Awarded Best Children's Live-Action Series
  - The website for the programme was nominated for Best Interactive Site
- BAFTA Children's Awards 2008
  - Awarded Best Pre-School Live Action Series
- BAFTA Children's Awards 2009
  - Nominated for Best Pre-School Live Action

== Merchandising ==
In the Night Garden... has books, DVDs, toys and magazines that have been marketed since 2007.

=== Books ===
In 2007, Ladybird Books published a full In the Night Garden range of books, some had lifted the flap features (The Prettiest Flower, 2007) and some had sounds from the programme (What a Noisy Pinky Ponk!, 2009), these usually retailed for £8.99 when they were released from BBC Books/Ragdoll Productions.

=== Toys ===
The show's producers, Ragdoll Productions, signed a deal to make the toy producer Hasbro a global partner before the show was first aired and merchandise was first made available in July 2007. The range includes small Igglepiggle, Upsy Daisy and Makka Pakka stuffed toys and a small Ninky Nonk train with detachable carriages. Wheeled toy licensee MV Sports & Leisure Limited produced a range of scooters and trikes. Play-Doh made some dough that came packaged with an Igglepiggle-shaped cut-out.

In the spring of 2008, several new toys arrived, including roll-along characters, Talking Cuddly Makka Pakka, Ninky Nonk Pop-up tent and more. Hasbro won the 2008 "Best Licensed Toy or Game range" Licensing Award for their In The Night Garden... range.

In January 2009, a spokesman for the BBC confirmed that they had asked Hasbro to change the CGI skin colour of the Upsy Daisy CGI doll following "a handful of complaints". The doll was originally released with a noticeably lighter complexion than seen in the television series, as it was based on the animated version of Upsy Daisy.

In 2010, more new toys were released like the Igglepiggle and Upsy Daisy set that contained a copy of the Series 2 episode The Pontipines' Picnic (2008) on DVD as well as an electronic Ninky Nonk (which made the actual sounds from the Show) and a Playmat that had: the Bridge, the Tombliboo Bush (with The Tombliboos and their beds), the Gazebo and the Pinky Ponk.

A different company, Golden Bear Toys have also made a range of In The Night Garden... toys, featuring Upsy Daisy and Igglepiggle. These include the "Musical Ninky Nonk Bubble Train" and the "Igglepiggle Wind-up Musical Boat."

On 1 October 2019, the "In the Night Garden Igglepiggle Peek-a-boo Clip-on Toy" made by Golden Bear Toys was recalled due to a possible choking hazard to young children.

== Live theatrical show ==
In the Night Garden...Live! started a first UK tour in July 2010. The show took place in an inflatable, purpose-built 'show-dome'. The show debuted and premiered in Liverpool and moved on to London, Glasgow and Birmingham. In the Night Garden...Live! has toured the United Kingdom every summer.

In 2018, the 'show-dome' format was retired due to low ticket numbers. For 2019, the show began touring as a theatre-based experience.

== ZinkyZonk Specials ==
A spin-off series, titled In the Night Garden... ZinkyZonk Specials was announced by WildBrain in September 2022. The six 15-minute specials are CGI-animated in Canada by WildBrain Studios, with an initial broadcast deal made with Hop! Channel and Luil tv in Israel. The series first premiered in Australia on ABC Kids in September 2022.

The specials centre on a brand new character called the Zonk, who sends the characters off to the magical world of the ZonkeyZoney so they can relax in peace. The series is fully animated in 3D CGI animation, unlike the original series which was a mix of CGI, 2D animation and live-action.
