= Being Eileen =

2013 British TV comedy-drama series

- Title card (series 1 onwards)
- Also known as: Lapland
- Genre: Comedy drama
- Created by: Michael Wynne
- Written by: Michael Wynne
- Directed by: Catherine Morshead; Simon Delaney; Susan Tully
- Starring: Sue Johnston; William Ash; Dean Andrews (Being Eileen); Elizabeth Berrington; Stephen Graham (Lapland); Julie Graham; Zawe Ashton (Lapland); Connor Dempsey; Georgia Doyle; Adam Scotland; Ellis Murphy; Keith Barron
- Theme music composer: Simon Lacey; Mark Thomas
- Opening theme: "Eileen"
- Country of origin: United Kingdom
- Original language: English
- No. of series: 1
- No. of episodes: 7

Production
- Executive producers: Anne Gilchrist; Pete Thornton
- Producer: Rosemary McGowan
- Production locations: Lapland; Birkenhead
- Editors: Jamie Pearson; Mark Davies
- Running time: 30 minutes (Formally 75 minutes, originally intended to be 90 minutes)
- Production company: BBC

Original release
- Network: BBC One; BBC HD; BBC Two (Sign Zone)
- Release: 24 December 2011 – 11 March 2013

Being Eileen is a BBC comedy-drama which began as a six-part series on 4 February and ended on 11 March 2013. It began as a one-off Christmas special titled Lapland, broadcast in the United Kingdom on BBC One on 24 December 2011. A full series was later announced, with the title Being Eileen, consisting of six 30 minute episodes, due to the success of the single episode, which was viewed by 6.9 million viewers upon its original airing. The series also aired on BBC Two as part of Sign Zone, which features sign language throughout. The series was released on DVD on 1 April 2013.

The series, written by Michael Wynne, features an ensemble cast. Headed by Sue Johnston, who plays Eileen Lewis, the programme focuses on her, the widowed matriarch of a "large, close-knit and dysfunctional Northern family". The single episode focused on the family's visit to Lapland, whilst the series focuses on their life in Birkenhead. Elizabeth Berrington and Stephen Graham (later recast to Dean Andrews) play Eileen's children, whilst William Ash and Julie Graham play their partners. All the cast - Johnston, Berrington, Ash, Graham and Keith Barron - a love interest for Eileen - returned for the series, with the exceptions of Stephen Graham and Zawe Ashton, who played Jingle Jill.

== Production ==
Michael Wynne wrote the first script for Lapland. He said in an interview, "I just went on a day trip, which was pretty hardcore. It was a three-hour trip there and back. I went a couple of weeks before Christmas, and it was stressful enough then". The kind of pressure that would build when it's actually Christmas and everyone wants it to be perfect is just a gift to write about. I thought it would be good if a big, messy family like my own went away". When the cast and crew arrived on location in Norway, Wynne said that they had to do "a bit of rewriting" due to there being no snow falling whilst they were filming, to which he said, "They're not really looking for snow. And they get to make jokes about climate change and it all looking like Aberystwyth". The episode was originally supposed to last 90 minutes, but was cut down to 75. Although set in Lapland, the scenes were filmed in Norway. Sue Johnston said, "We flew to Tromsø and then travelled an hour north and stayed on an army barracks". Producer Rosemary McGowan said, "Michael Wynne has skilfully brought to life one ordinary family's chaotic experience of Christmas in a way that will have people all over the country chuckling in recognition. Funny, warm but also moving". Johnston teased the series, "Stephen Graham plays my son and his wife (Julie Graham) has some killer funny lines. She doesn’t want to be there at all and her kids are very, very naughty. Then there's my daughter and her husband, who's a boring know-it-all who keeps going on about seeing The Northern Lights, plus their two children who are lovely".

It was just a one-off after I had this idea about a family going to Lapland then the BBC said ‘do you think there's any more life in it?’. I’ve really enjoyed doing the series and getting involved in the process of the filming, even down to working with the composer and the woman who did the title sequence. I am a producer as well so I was there on set for a lot of the filming and editing, saying things like ‘have you got another shot of that?’ and ‘that doesn’t work!’. This series is very much inspired by growing up in Birkenhead and my family and friends. I wanted to put a nice family who get on on the telly – they have problems but they like each other.

— Writer and creator Michael Wynne talking about the series, and his inspiration.

On 4 October 2012, the BBC announced that Lapland will have a full series. The series followed the success of that of the Christmas special, which was watched by 6.89 million. Lapland is made by BBC In-House Comedy and was filmed in locations at Salford, Manchester, Liverpool, Birkenhead, New Brighton, World Museum and Landican Cemetery. This series was again written by Wynne and produced by McGowan. Mark Freeland the controller of UK Comedy Production, BBC said, "After its rating success last Christmas, it's exciting that Lapland is coming back as a series. It shows BBC One backs fresh, new, comic writing". Pete Thornton, executive producer added, "Michael Wynne has penned a beautifully nuanced, warm hearted Northern comedy featuring a highly original comic family. With the brilliant Sue Johnston leading a stellar cast, we're thrilled to welcome this hit ensemble back to BBC One". Former EastEnders actress Susan Tully directed some of the series episodes, as did Simon Delaney. All the main cast returned, with the exception of Stephen Graham and Zawe Ashton. On 28 December 2012, a trailer was released showcasing the channel's 2013 programs; Lapland being shown. In 2013, the series was renamed to Being Eileen. Johnston said of the show being made into a series, "To me, it was just a one-off drama at the time, so it was a nice surprise when they suddenly got in touch". The series finished on 11 March 2013. Phil Perez, a guest star in "Ay Carumba", said that there was "talk of another series" after the first, when interviewed in January 2013 although as of 2017 no second series has been produced.

=== Cast and characters ===
The 2013 series cast. (L-R: Connor Dempsey, Georgia Doyle, Adam Scotland, Julie Graham, Sue Johnston, Dean Andrews, Elizabeth Berrington, Ellis Murphy and William Ash)

The ensemble cast, features Johnston as the "ageing mother" and the "widowed matriarch" Eileen. Elizabeth Berrington plays Paula, and initially Stephen Graham, later Dean Andrews plays Pete, both of whom play Eileen's children. William Ash plays Paula's husband Ray and Julie Graham plays Pete's wife Mandy, both of whom are described as "rather unlovable partners". Adam Scotland, Ellis Murphy, Connor Dempsey and Georgia Doyle as Eileen's grandchildren, Jack, Liam, Ethan and Melissa, described as a "mixed bag of young children, some spoilt-rotten, some sugar-sweet". Ashton played Jingle Jill, a tourism guide for the single episode, and Keith Barron plays Maurice, a love interest for Eileen.

The "wit" of the script appealed to Johnston due to her having to bury her father near Christmas, "as did the chance of a lifetime to go to the frozen north", what Johnston called, "the icing on the cake". Stephen Graham added, "I remember Sue from when she was in Brookside and she's a legend. I’ve always wanted to work with her. For me to work with Sue Johnston is like playing football with Steven Gerrard". Perez agreed, calling her "great to work" and "so friendly", adding "you felt as if you had known her for years". Wynne added, "Sue is brilliant. She is so experienced that she just hits it – the comedy and the pathos. It is exactly what you were thinking and 100 times more". Upon the announcement of the series, it was stated that Stephen Graham's character had been recast to Marchlands star Dean Andrews. Johnston said of this, "I was very sad when I heard that Stephen wasn’t going to do it, but then when I met Dean Andrews, all was forgiven. He's lovely". Julie Graham was the first to sign up for the series. Barron who played Maurice was confirmed to return in a guest role. Johnston said of the Berrington's character Paula, "Oh, she's always hysterical. And I think she thinks her mother's going loopy, but she's crazier than her mother. She's just always stressed out, and there's a lot of conflict between her and her brother, who's played by Dean. She's the sort of daughter who wants attention. Obviously, Pete has been the golden boy and there's a bit of tension between Eileen and Paula, as there often is between a mother and daughter, when there's a son involved. So all that adds to the drama". The series focusses on Eileen's "tough" time being apart from her deceased husband Ted. Johnston said that Eileen is trying to "get on with her life" after his death. She said, "In doing so, she meets opposition from the family who think she has gone a bit loopy. They have never seen the fact that she can be strong and independent. She goes to a Rihanna concert with an old friend and becomes a lot more adventurous but her family starts to wonder what is going on".

The single episode featured several guest cast members, such as Emily Joyce and Rufus Jones who played husband and wife Miranda and Julian. Oliver Watton appeared as "Steward", whilst Caspar Phillipson appeared as Teppo. Fraser Ayres, Juga Leppajarvi and Andrei Aleen appeared as Brian, Bavval and Hans respectively. Liv Olsen appeared as "Sleepy Elf", whilst Nigel Harris played "Santa". Amrita Acharia and Matt Green appeared as "Bride" and "Groom", whilst finally, Mel Oskar appeared as "Receptionist". In the first episode of the series, "Missing", Adam Abbou, Casey-Lee Jolleys and Lewis Pryor all appeared as Tyler, Julie and Edward. Imara Rodgers and Emily Forrest played minor parts, and Joan Hempson, Stephen Aintree and Alex Watson played Hilda, Sid and "Fireman". In the second episode, "Homeless", Daniel Hayes appeared as Luke, Pearce Quigley played Dave, Pauline Fleming as Margie and Will Travis as Ken. Rosina Carbone appeared as Miss Igoe, Vicki Gates as Pat, and Ozzie Yue played "Taxi Driver". Finally, Adam Stevens played Keith, both in "Homeless" and in "Birthday". In "Ay Carumba", Phil Perez appeared as Carlos, a zumba teacher. Perez said of his character and how he got the role, "My character has a lot of confidence. I originally auditioned for a much smaller part but was then given one of the lead parts in the third episode. It was a great laugh and the scenes when I am teaching them how to dance are very funny". Along with Perez, Kevin Harvey, Conrad Nelson, Tanya Vital, Ian Munzberger, Debra Redcliffe and Taylor Perry played Mr Brown, "Olympic Coach", Lynda, Carl, Kim and Ben respectively. Eileen O'Brien played Rita, Sue Jenkins was Maureen and Susan Twist played Beedie. O'Brien, Jenkins and Twist all reprised their roles in "Birthday". In "Monopoly", Derek Barr, Susan Cormack and Emma Herron appeared as Derek, Barb and Carol, respectively, and Justin Edwards was credited as the voice on Eileen's Spanish tape. In "DIY", Lenny Wood appeared as Gavin, Sue Devaney as Carmel, James Devlin as Rodger, Naveen Riley Mohamed as Trace, Warren Donnelly as "Security Guard", Emily Pennington as Viv and Russ Booth as "Workman". Along with Stevens, O'Brien, Jenkins and Twist reprising their roles in "Birthday" - the final episode of the series - Rachel McGuiness appeared as Angela, and Barron reprised his role from "Lapland" as Maurice.

== Episodes ==
=== Special (2011) ===
No.	Title	Written by	Original release date	U.K. viewers (millions)
–	"Lapland"	Michael Wynne	24 December 2011	6.89
The Lewis family are determined to leave their troubles at home in Birkenhead when they set out for Lapland in search of Santa, huskies, reindeer, and hopefully the mysterious northern lights. They soon discover that baggage is not so easily left behind, but also that magic can be found in the most unexpected places. - BBC

=== Series 1 (2013) ===
No.	Title	Written by	Original release date	U.K. viewers (millions)
1	"Missing"	Michael Wynne	4 February 2013	2.43
Eileen goes missing and Paula goes into meltdown. Pete tries to treat Mandy, but he gets dragged into searching for their mum, who is not missing after all. - BBC
2	"Homeless"	Michael Wynne	11 February 2013	2.55
Eileen takes in a homeless man, while Paula and Ray take in a homeless rabbit.- BBC
3	"Ay Carumba"	Michael Wynne	18 February 2013	2.10
Eileen joins a group of other local widows, but will not play by the rules. Paula and Mandy compete over the latest Brazilian fitness craze, and Ethan has a hidden talent that could take him all the way to the Olympics... Or not.- BBC
4	"Monopoly"	Michael Wynne	25 February 2013	2.12
Eileen decides to spend a quiet afternoon learning Spanish; that is, until she is invaded by the family, with Ray wanting to be a power seller on eBay and Mandy a meat-seller from Eileen's kitchen.- BBC
5	"DIY"	Michael Wynne	4 March 2013	2.92
A family outing to the local DIY store ends in mayhem. Eileen works her magic on the store manager, and Mandy's dream bathroom remains a dream.- BBC
6	"Birthday"	Michael Wynne	11 March 2013	2.14
Ray builds a pirate ship for Liam's themed party - but Liam is scared of pirates. Paula hits the bottle, Mandy feels sick and Eileen gets a surprise visitor from Lapland.- BBC

== Reception ==
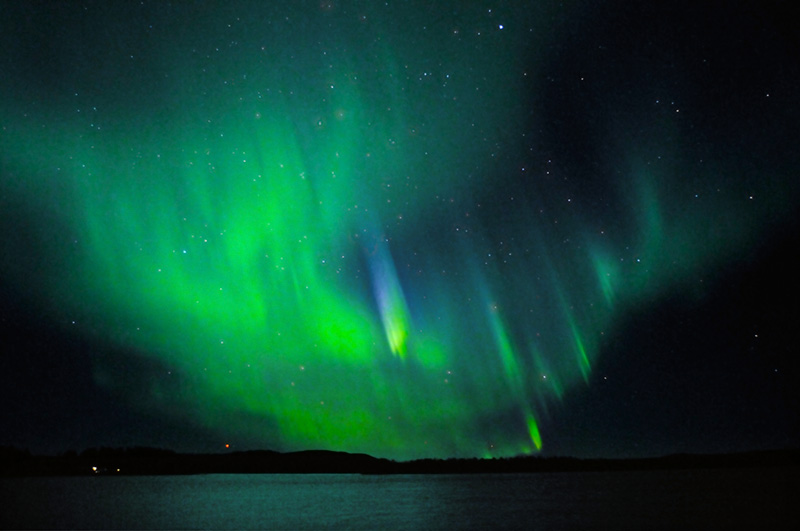
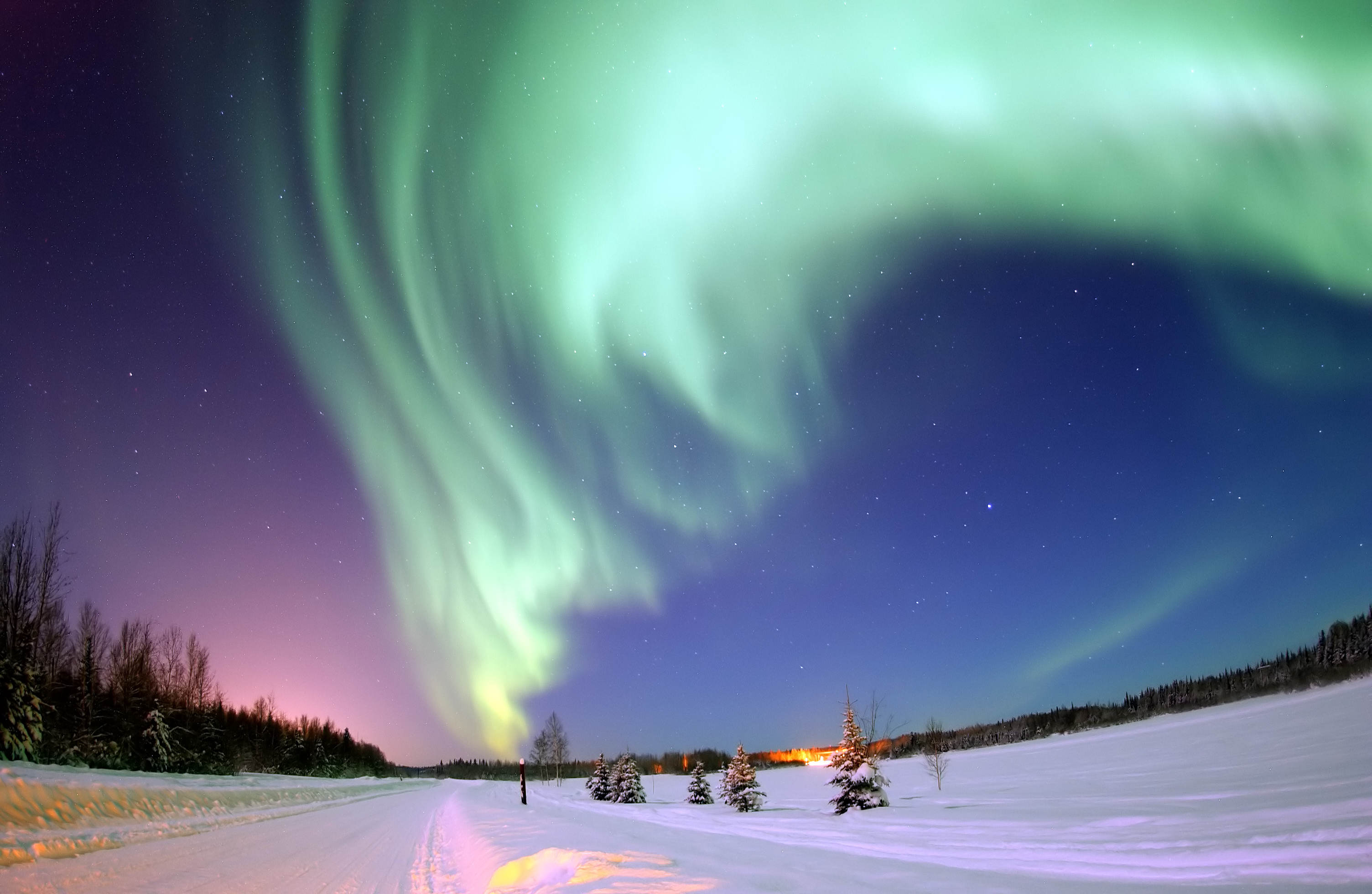
In the single episode, all the main characters watched the Northern Lights. Johnston said they "take your breath away", adding they were "wonderful".

Both Lapland and Being Eileen have received mixed to positive reviews from critics. Tom Sutcliffe from The Daily Telegraph reviewed Lapland negatively, saying that "the Northern Lights provided the cure-all for family dysfunction", which he called "deeply unconvincing" as the show had been "so sour and bad-tempered up to this point", but did add that there were "some good lines". However, Gerard Gilbert and Pete Naughton disagreed; Gilbert said that Lapland was a "heart-warming tale of a Birkenhead family holidaying in Lapland" with Naughton and Paddy Shennan saying that the cast was "strong" for both Lapland and Being Eileen. Naughton added that there were "a handful of smartly observed scenes that will be familiar to many viewers". Naughton finished, "At points, this takes the programme more into the realm of edgy, Shameless-style drama than gentle festive comedy; but Wynne manages to sugar the pill with a good deal of warm Northern humour". British Comedy Guide called Lapland "unfunny" and "depressing". They said, "The cast were as good as their names and pedigrees suggest, but Christmas spirit? Not likely". They reported that users feedback on Twitter was negative. However, writers from Daily Telegraph and Liverpool Echo disagreed, calling the single episode "popular" and that it "went down well" with audiences, but British Comedy Guide and Alison Graham of Radio Times, opined that they were "flabbergasted" and "surprised" that the BBC had ordered a series. Shennan of Liverpool Echo wrote a positive review of Being Eileen saying that, "Wynne's words raised plenty of smiles" adding, "There were misunderstandings aplenty amid the many pleasing moments". However he did complain about the scheduling of the program;

THE light, inoffensive, not-at-all-in-your-face comedy Being Eileen is the sort of sitcom I could easily imagine slipping through the Beeb's fingers. But after investing in, holding onto and nurturing Birkenhead writer Michael Wynne's follow-up to one-off Christmas 2011 outing Lapland, you’d think the powers-that-be would see things through to the end. The end being the all-important issue of scheduling, which can help make or break a new programme. Being Eileen is the definition of family viewing – a pleasant, largely enjoyable, easy on the eyes and ears, mildly diverting half-hour in the company of a grandmother, her children and their children. That's right – exactly the sort of thing you would expect to see warming up the BBC's evening audience at, say, 8pm or 8.30pm. So I wonder if anyone can explain to me – and many others – why it's being thrown away after the national and local news at 10.35pm. Did the BBC decision-makers involved suddenly lose confidence in it and decide to quietly bury it – or have they just lost their marbles?

— Paddy Shennan, Liverpool Echo

Writers from Daily Telegraph and Liverpool Echo included Being Eileen in its television highlights of the week commencing 4 February 2013, as did The Guardian, Reveal, The Irish Times, Sunday Mail, Western Mail, Daily Mirror and Daily Star. Sarah Doran from entertainment.ie said of Being Eileen; "If it's anything like Lapland we'll be hooked", whilst Alan Corr of Raidió Teilifís Éireann described the series, "Blame or give credit to Gavin & Stacey, but of late there's been a glut of new provincial English sitcoms that strike the right balance between syrupy and actually quite funny and here's another one to add to the list". Adrian Michaels of Daily Telegraph wrote a positive review upon the airing of the first episode, "Missing", deeming it "funny and touching" adding, "This is classic British comedy territory, finding a deep well of humour in sadness". Michaels praised Johnston's performance, as did Pete Naughton. He carried on to say that the "family units crackle with banter" adding that there are some "glorious" moments. He called the episode "very enjoyable", a view Michael's colleague, Michael Hogan shared, upon watching the third episode, "Ay Carumba". Michaels finished, "Being Eileen deserved far better than a miserable slot after the 10.00pm news, particularly when we were offered only a repeat of Outnumbered at 9.00pm", sharing Shennan's point. David Higgerson of Liverpool Echo gave a mixed review, noting the timeslot of the programme as a problem, saying, "What sort of "heart-warming comedy" gets put on the telly on a Monday night, just after the regional news?", calling the show "not very good", finishing, "The problem with Being Eileen is that in an attempt to be heartwarming, it forgets to be funny. And in trying to set up humorous situations, it loses its heartwarming touch". Again, Sutcliffe, now writing for The Independent, said that Being Eileen was "alright", saying that the shows "effortful implausibilities for comic effect aren't a deal-breaker", calling the series "not quite necessary". Contrastingly, Chris Dunkley, a former critic of Financial Times predicted that the show would be "extremely popular", calling it "cleverly made" after he watched the first episode of the series. David Stephenson of Sunday Express said of the show, "Amazingly, there was cause for optimism during a BBC1 sitcom", adding that he "laughed involuntarily" throughout, adding that the show should have been called Come On, Eileen, a reference shared by The Guardian's John Plunkett.

== DVD release ==
Being Eileen was released on a one-disk DVD set on 1 April 2013, announced by the BBC. The series has been rated by the British Board of Film Classification between Universal (U) and Parental Guidance (PG).
