= Byatt =

Byatt is a surname. Notable people with the surname include:

- A. S. Byatt (1936–2023), English novelist, poet and Booker Prize winner
- Andy Byatt, English wildlife documentary film producer for the BBC Natural History Unit (NHU) in Bristol
- Anthony Byatt (1928–2014), English writer
- Dennis Byatt (born 1958), English footballer
- Horace Byatt (1875–1933), British colonial governor
- Ian Byatt (born 1932), British economist, first director general of Ofwat
- Robin Byatt (1930–2019), British diplomat
- Sharon Byatt, British based actress born in Liverpool, who played Irenee in Carla Lane's Bread

== See also ==
- 22724 Byatt (provisional designation: 1998 SE59), an outer main-belt minor planet
