= Micrometeorite =

Meteoroid that survives Earth's atmosphere

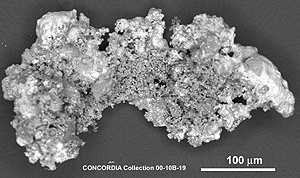
- Micrometerorite collected from the Antarctic snow.

A micrometeorite is a micrometeoroid that has survived entry through the Earth's atmosphere. Usually found on Earth's surface, micrometeorites differ from meteorites in that they are smaller in size, more abundant, and different in composition. The IAU officially defines meteoroids as 30 micrometers to 1 meter; micrometeorites are the small end of the range (~submillimeter). They are a subset of cosmic dust, which also includes the smaller interplanetary dust particles (IDPs).

Micrometeorites enter Earth's atmosphere at high velocities (at least 11 km/s) and undergo heating through atmospheric friction and compression. Micrometeorites individually weigh between 10^{−9} and 10^{−4} g and collectively comprise most of the extraterrestrial material that has come to the present-day Earth.

Fred Lawrence Whipple coined the term micro-meteorite to describe dust-sized objects that fall to the Earth. Sometimes meteoroids and micrometeoroids entering the Earth's atmosphere are visible as meteors or "shooting stars", whether or not they reach the ground and survive as meteorites and micrometeorites.

== Introduction ==
Micrometeorite (MM) textures vary as their original structural and mineral compositions are modified by the degree of heating that they experience entering the atmosphere—a function of their initial speed and angle of entry. They range from unmelted particles that retain their original mineralogy (Fig. 1 a, b), to partially melted particles (Fig. 1 c, d) to round melted cosmic spherules (Fig. 1 e, f, g, h, Fig. 2) some of which have lost a large portion of their mass through vaporization (Fig. 1 i). Classification is based on composition and degree of heating.

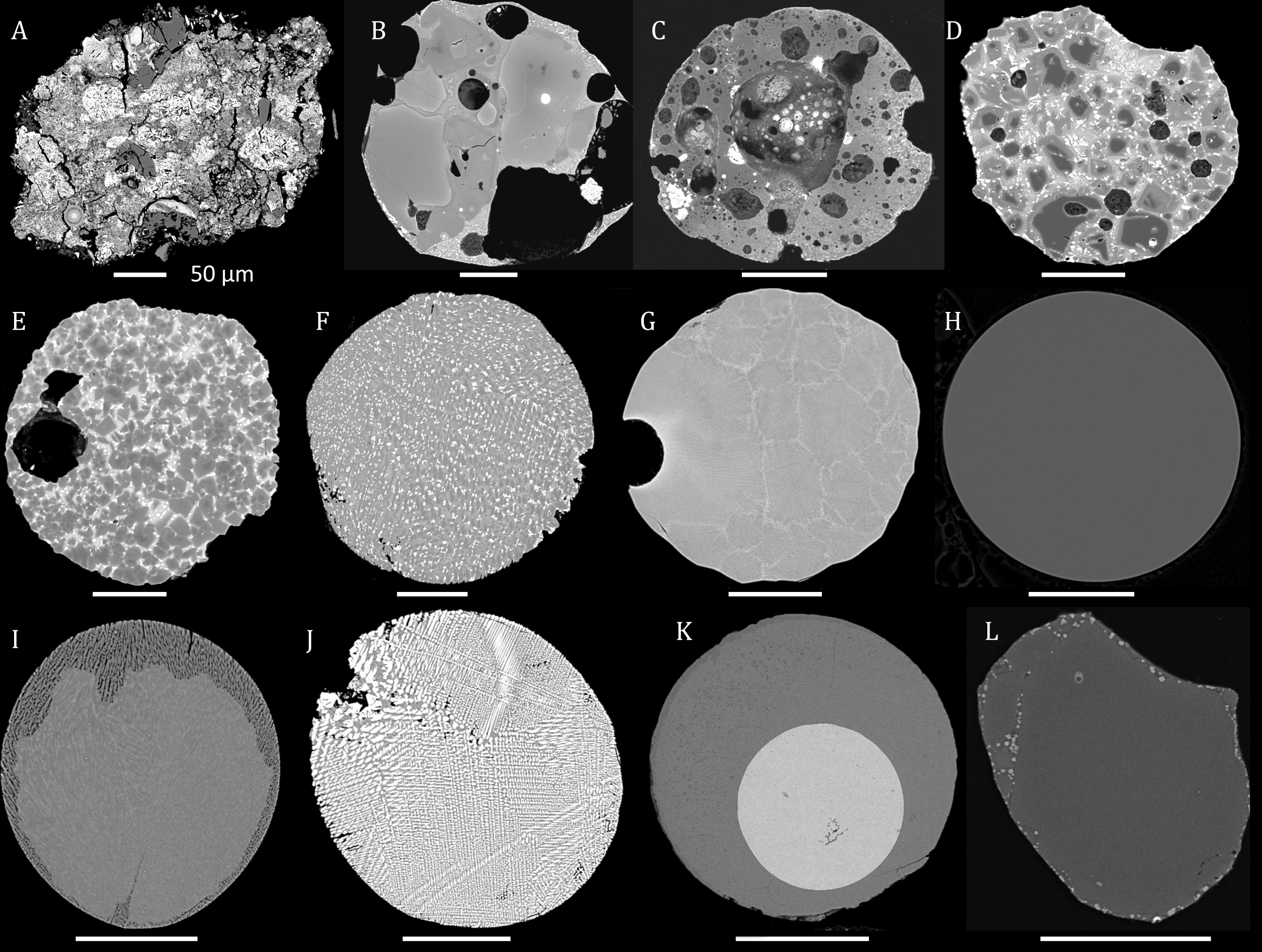
Figure 1. Cross sections of different micrometeorite classes: a) Fine-grained unmelted; b) Coarse-grained Unmelted; c) Scoriaceous; d) Relict-grain Bearing; e) Porphyritic; f) Barred olivine; g) Cryptocrystalline; h) Glass; i) CAT; j) G-type; k) I-type; and l) Single mineral. Except for G- and I-types all are silicate rich, called stony MMs. Scale bars are 50 μm.

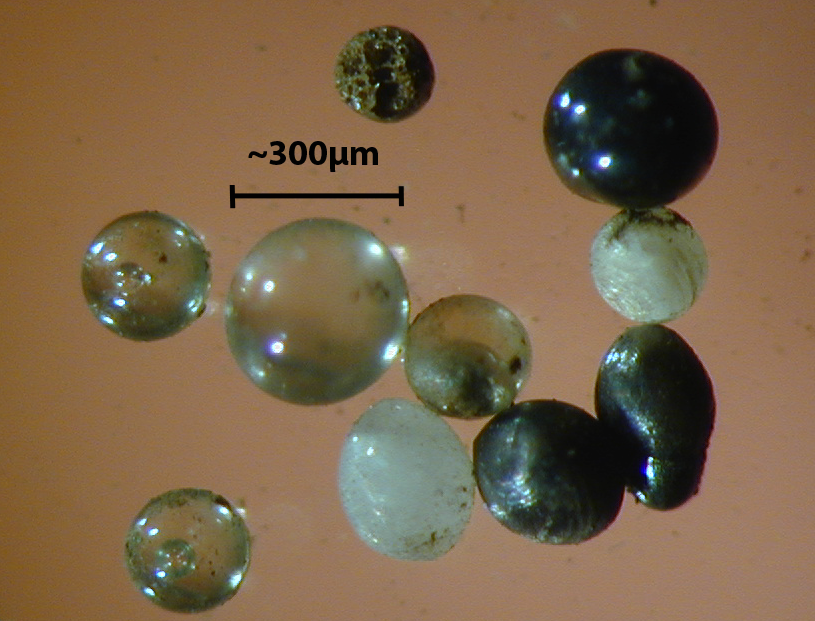
Figure 2. Light microscope images of stony cosmic spherules.

The extraterrestrial origins of micrometeorites are determined by microanalyses that show that:

- The metal they contain is similar to that found in meteorites.
- Some have wüstite, a high-temperature iron oxide found in meteorite fusion crusts.
- Their silicate minerals have major and trace elements ratios similar to those in meteorites.
- The abundances of cosmogenic manganese (^{53}Mn) in iron spherules and of cosmogenic beryllium (^{10}Be), aluminum (^{26}Al), and solar neon isotope in stony MMs are extraterrestrial
- The presence of pre-solar grains in some MMs and deuterium excesses in ultra-carbonaceous MMs indicates that they are not only extraterrestrial but that some of their components formed before the Solar System.

An estimated 40,000 ± 20,000 tonnes per year (t/yr) of cosmic dust enters the upper atmosphere each year of which less than 10% (2700 ± 1400 t/yr) is estimated to reach the surface as particles. Therefore the mass of micrometeorites deposited is roughly 50 times higher than that estimated for meteorites, which represent approximately 50 t/yr, and the huge number of particles entering the atmosphere each year (~10^{17} > 10 μm) suggests that large MM collections contain particles from all dust-producing objects in the Solar System including asteroids, comets, and fragments from the Moon and Mars. Large MM collections provide information on the size, composition, atmospheric heating effects and types of materials accreting on Earth while detailed studies of individual MMs give insights into their origin, the nature of the carbon, amino acids and pre-solar grains they contain.

Chemical analysis of the microscopic chromite crystals, or chrome-spinels, retrieved from micrometeorites in acid baths has shown that primitive achondrites, which represent less than half a percent of the MM reaching Earth today, were common among MMs accreting more than 466 million years ago.

== Collection sites ==
Click here to see a seven-minute movie of MMs being collected from the bottom of the South Pole drinking water well.

Micrometeorites have been collected from deep-sea sediments, sedimentary rocks and polar sediments. They were previously collected primarily from polar snow and ice because of their low concentrations on the Earth's surface, but in 2016 a method to extract micrometeorites in urban environments was discovered.

=== Ocean sediments ===
Melted micrometeorites (cosmic spherules) were first collected from deep-sea sediments during the 1873 to 1876 expedition of HMS Challenger. In 1891, Murray and Renard found "two groups [of micrometeorites]: first, black magnetic spherules, with or without a metallic nucleus; second, brown-coloured spherules resembling chondr(ul)es, with a crystalline structure". In 1883, they suggested that these spherules were extraterrestrial because they were found far from terrestrial particle sources, they did not resemble magnetic spheres produced in furnaces of the time, and their nickel-iron (Fe-Ni) metal cores did not resemble metallic iron found in volcanic rocks. The spherules were most abundant in slowly accumulating sediments, particularly red clays deposited below the carbonate compensation depth, a finding that supported a meteoritic origin. In addition to those spheres with Fe-Ni metal cores, some spherules larger than 300 μm contain a core of elements from the platinum group.

Since the first collection of HMS Challenger, cosmic spherules have been recovered from ocean sediments using cores, box cores, clamshell grabbers, and magnetic sleds. Among these a magnetic sled, called the "Cosmic Muck Rake", retrieved thousands of cosmic spherules from the top 10 cm of red clays on the Pacific Ocean floor.

=== Terrestrial sediments ===
Terrestrial sediments also contain micrometeorites. These have been found in samples that:

- Have low sedimentation rates such as claystones and hardgrounds
- Are easily dissolved such as salt deposits and limestones
- Have been mass sorted such as heavy mineral concentrates found in deserts and beach sands.

The oldest MMs are totally altered iron spherules found in 140- to 180-million-year-old hardgrounds.

=== Urban micrometeorites ===
In 2016 a new study showed that flat roofs in urban areas are fruitful places to extract micrometeorites. The "urban" cosmic spherules have a shorter terrestrial age and are less altered than the previous findings.

Amateur collectors may find micrometeorites in areas where dust from a large area has been concentrated, such as from a roof downspout.

=== Polar depositions ===
Micrometeorites found in polar sediments are much less weathered than those found in other terrestrial environments, as evidenced by little etching of interstitial glass, and the presence of large numbers of glass spherules and unmelted micrometeorites, particle types that are rare or absent in deep-sea samples. The MMs found in polar regions have been collected from Greenland snow, Greenland cryoconite, Antarctic blue ice Antarctic aeolian (wind-driven) debris, ice cores, the bottom of the South Pole water well, Antarctic sediment traps and present day Antarctic snow.

== Classification and origins of micrometeorites ==
=== Classification ===
Modern classification of meteorites and micrometeorites is complex; the 2007 review paper of Krot et al. summarizes modern meteorite taxonomy. Linking individual micrometeorites to meteorite classification groups requires a comparison of their elemental, isotopic and textural characteristics.

=== Comet versus asteroid origin of micrometeorites ===
Whereas most meteorites originate from asteroids, the contrasting make-up of micrometeorites suggests that most originate from comets.

Fewer than 1% of MMs are achondritic and are similar to HED meteorites, which are thought to be from the asteroid 4 Vesta. Most MMs are compositionally similar to carbonaceous chondrites, whereas approximately 3% of meteorites are of this type. The dominance of carbonaceous chondrite-like MMs and their low abundance in meteorite collections suggests that most MMs derive from sources different from those of most meteorites. Since most meteorites derive from asteroids, an alternative source for MMs might be comets. The idea that MMs might originate from comets originated in 1950.

Until recently the greater-than-25-km/s entry velocities of micrometeoroids, measured for particles from comet streams, cast doubts against their survival as MMs. However, recent dynamical simulations suggest that 85% of cosmic dust could be cometary. Furthermore, analyses of particles returned from the comet, Wild 2, by the Stardust spacecraft show that these particles have compositions that are consistent with many micrometeorites. Nonetheless, some parent bodies of micrometeorites appear to be asteroids with chondrule-bearing carbonaceous chondrites.

== Extraterrestrial micrometeorites ==
The influx of micrometeoroids also contributes to the composition of regolith (planetary/lunar soil) on other bodies in the Solar System. Mars has an estimated annual micrometeoroid influx of between 2,700 and 59,000 t/yr. This contributes to about 1 m of micrometeoritic content to the depth of the Martian regolith every billion years. Measurements from the Viking program indicate that the Martian regolith is composed of 60% basaltic rock and 40% rock of meteoritic origin. The lower-density Martian atmosphere allows much larger particles than on Earth to survive the passage through to the surface, largely unaltered until impact. While on Earth particles that survive entry typically have undergone significant transformation, a significant fraction of particles entering the Martian atmosphere throughout the 60 to 1200-μm diameter range probably survive unmelted.

== See also ==
- Carbonaceous chondrite, a class of chondritic meteorites comprising at least seven known groups and many ungrouped
- Center for Meteorite Studies at Arizona State University
- Cosmic dust
- Glossary of meteoritics
- List of Martian meteorites
- List of meteorite minerals
- List of meteorites on Mars
- Meteorite classification
- Meteoritical Society
- Solar System
- The British and Irish Meteorite Society
