= Lance Powell (Brookside) =

Fictional character from Brookside

- Brookside character
- Portrayed by: Mickey Poppins
- Duration: 2000–2003
- First appearance: 5 July 2000
- Last appearance: 26 August 2003
- Introduced by: Paul Marquess
In-universe information
- Occupation: Barman
- Father: Ted Powell
- Mother: Mrs Powell
- Sisters: Leanne Powell

Lance Timothy Powell is a fictional character from the British Channel 4 soap opera Brookside, played by Mickey Poppins. The character debuted on-screen during the episode airing on 5 July 2000 and departed on 26 August 2003. Poppins had previously worked with the show's producer Paul Marquess and he created Lance especially for the actor. He was introduced with the returning characters of Leanne Powell (Vickie Gates) and Bev McLoughlin (Sarah White) to work in Bev's Bar as Marquess felt Brookside needed a "good bar with some great staff".

Lance's storylines do not feature "relationship problems or getting queer-bashed" and make no issue of his sexuality. This garnered criticism from the audience and Marquess received letters stigmatising Lance as a "betrayal of all gay men". But Marquess had played Lance as a "reaction" to gay characters from EastEnders who he believed only talked about their sexuality and suffered homophobia. Poppins described Lance as "a very truthful betrayal" of gay stereotypes.

Lance also strikes up a popular double act with Bev and begins a relationship with Fred Gonzalez (Richard Calkin). When Fred faces deportation, Bev marries Fred so he can stay. Poppins and White were subsequently nominated for a "Best On-screen Partnership" award. A Daily Record writer opined that Lance and Bev were "soul mates". Various critics have called Lance a camp character and Tony Stewart from the Daily Mirror thought that Lance made Graham Norton appear butch. A columnist from Inside Soap said that there was no other soap character offering the "entertainment value" that Lance did.

== Casting ==
Poppins worked alongside the serial's producer Paul Marquess as writers for fellow soap opera Coronation Street. Marquess asked Poppins if he acted and then created the part of Lance. Poppins was not required to audition and he accepted the role. Poppins was contracted with Brookside until September 2001 and admitted that he was unsure of what his status with the show would be beyond that date. Marquess later told Allison Maund from Inside Soap that he introduced Lance, alongside returning characters of Leanne Powell (Vickie Gates) and Bev McLoughlin (Sarah White) to work in Bev's Bar. He added that he felt Brookside needed a "good bar with some great staff". By November that year Poppins was still a part of the serial. He told Hendry that he often worried that writers would axe his character. Poppins played Lance for a total of three years and he later told Joe Riley from the Liverpool Echo that he was proud to have been a part of Brookside.

== Development ==
On his official character profile on Brookside.com, Lance was described as "a slight figure but with a personality that is larger than life." While interviewed by viewers of the serial, Poppins said that he did not "camp it up" while playing Lance because he thought it was "what people want to see". He explained that rather than Lance being "bitchy and on the prowl" he is a "celebration of all good things that are gay". His character is "a very truthful betrayal" of gay stereotypes. Poppins stated that he shared similarities with Lance such a "girl voice", but he was not as "nice" as Lance. He added that he was teetotal unlike Lance. Lance has a great "sense of loyalty", but when he is around members of the Dixon family, viewers "see another side to him". Poppins, who is gay himself, appreciated how the writers scripted Lance. He liked the fact that they did not take him on the journey of being involved in "relationship problems or getting queer-bashed" - which he believed was a "problem" with gay soap characters. Lance does not "bang on about being gay [...] he's just gay and, if you don't like it, tough." Poppins admitted that he would have found it boring if Lance did. He also spoke of his aspirations to be more like his fictional counterpart: "I wish I was as nice as Lance. He's a lovely bloke because he's got time for everyone and he's always jolly. I wish I could be more like him."

Lance's camp persona attracted criticism from the audience. Brookside's producer Marquess told Tina Ogle from The Guardian that "I've had a lot of letters saying he is a betrayal of all gay men. I feel you must be terribly insecure if you feel that. Are there no screaming queens around?" He explained that when Lance was created, they decided to play him as a "reaction" to the characters of Tony Hills (Mark Homer) and Simon Raymond (Andrew Lynford) from EastEnders. Marquess believed that Tony and Simon only talked about their sexuality and just became victims of homophobia. He affirmed that the show had created a character that "nobody will be homophobic [to] as a device" and "he just happens to be gay." The actor later told Marion McMullen from the Coventry Evening Telegraph that Lance is a great character who is not a part of the series to deal with themes of gay issues. Sexuality is second, firstly Lance is a person. Poppins added that there is a lot of likeable "comic potential" in his character.

Lance is the brother of Leanne, Poppins said that he hoped Lance would not discover Leanne's nasty side even though "deep down he must know". But she "can always pull the wool over his eyes". He also enjoyed the dynamics of Lance and Leanne's relationship. The actor did not want any more of Lance's family to be introduced because he thought they were best not seen. It was better to have viewers "drawing their own conclusions about them".

Lance also strikes up a double act with the character of Bev and their partnership proved popular. Poppins told the Sunday Mail's Hendry that their "comes from [himself and White] genuinely getting on together" and their friendship shows on-screen. In one storyline Bev marries Lance's Brazilian boyfriend Fred Gonzalez (Richard Calkin) to keep him in the country. When the authorities investigate she goes on the run; off-screen, White had gone on maternity leave. Poppins hoped that she would not take time off again as he had been "lost without" her in Lance's scenes. He also believed that the Lance's relationship with Fred was for the benefit of Bev's story arc. Poppins named Lance's most memorable moment as being when he moved in with Max Farnham (Steven Pinder) because it was "great" and "tickled" him. He also revealed that he believed that Lance's "heart belongs to Max" and that he should make a move on Lance. During White's pregnancy, Bev discusses having Fred's child for him and Lance. This would have accommodated White's pregnancy; however, the show's writers decided against doing the storyline. The storyline concluded with Bev changing her mind about the baby leaving Lance and Fred "distraught". Leanne decides to get revenge for Lance by telling Bev that the authorities have discovered the wedding was not legitimate. Bev then goes on the run to avoid prison. Gates told Inside Soap's Maund that her character only told the lies to prevent Lance from leaving. She said that "Lance said he was going to leave after he fell out with Bev" so Leanne decided to think up schemes to keep him around. She knows that she needs to keep Lance working at the bar. Gates added that "she realised that if Bev left then Lance would probably stay, and things just snowballed from there."

In the months that followed Bev's return, the double act with Lance was not as prominent. Lance begins working in Max's restaurant, The Shelf, while Bev is still in her bar. White told Hendry that she hoped that Lance and Bev would "come back together soon" because she loved their friendship. She liked to work with Poppins as their characters "worked really well together" and he brought out Bev's "humane side".

== Storylines ==
Lance begins working as a barman for Bev at her Bar on Brookside Parade and moves in with Leanne. When they are evicted, Lance turns to Max Farnham for help and manages to convince him to let them stay with him. He later clashes with Dave Burns (Simon Chadwick), who suggests that Lance may be lying about his long-distance boyfriend Fred. Fred turns out to be real and a fake wedding between Bev and Fred is staged in order for him to remain in the country. Soon after, the relationship breaks down and Fred is deported back to Brazil.

Lance finds himself at odds with Leanne's boyfriend Christy Murray (Andrew Glynn) when he lies to Leanne that Lance made unwanted advances towards him in the toilets. Bev returns and Lance is happy to see her and he moves in and forms a bond with her son, Josh (Jack McMullen) and helps Bev deal with Josh's misbehaviour. Lance then moves out to be with a new boyfriend but the relationship falls apart quickly, leaving him heartbroken. He is last seen consoling Christy after Leanne dumps him.

== Reception ==
For the portrayal of Lance and Bev, Poppins and White received a nomination for "Best On-screen Partnership" at the 2001 British Soap Awards. At the 2001 Inside Soap Awards, Lance was nominated for "Funniest Character". Merle Brown of the Daily Record opined that the wedding storyline between Bev, Fred and Lance was a "total copy" of sham wedding featured in the soap opera Emmerdale. However, Brown praised the Brookside's decision to move Lance and Leanne into Max's home. She warned Max to "watch out" because Lance is "clearly in love" and Max had "bitten off more than he can chew" with the Powell siblings. She also predicted that the "comedy that is clearly about to ensue will be some of the best of the year in Brookie". Another columnist from the news outlet said that Lance and Bev were soul mates. Ian Hyland from the Sunday Mirror criticised the scenes in which Bev asked Lance to father a child. He branded it unbelievable and "ridiculous" because Lance is "so fey he can barely stand up never mind" have sex.

Lance's feminine side has often resulted in him being tagged as "camp". The Guardian's Ogle said that Lance was "very camp" and offered "a lot in the way of humour, albeit in a queenly fashion". She added it was this trait that attracted criticism from viewers. Liverpool Daily Post's Philip Key said that Poppins was "the camp barman Lance from Brookside" and soap "expert" Sharon Marshall agreed that Lance was just camp. Tony Stewart from the Daily Mirror thought that Lance was so camp that he made "Graham Norton look butch". His colleague Tony Purnell said that the "limp-wristed Lance" provided "light relief". When Lance is made homeless and Max takes him in, Purnell quipped: "since the lad is as camp as a row of tents I would have thought he would have been more comfortable under canvas." After a short absence from the screen in 2001, Rob Driscoll, writing for the Daily Record, said that it was "great" to have Lance back. A writer from Liverpool Echo said that Poppins is instantly recognisable as "camp Lance Powell, the long-suffering brother of troublemaker Leanne".

A columnist from Inside Soap said that too many Brookside characters had been given "personality transplants" and joked that the unlikely scenario of Lance "chatting up girls" was imminent, while another writer from the magazine wrote that there has never been higher "entertainment value" than Lance. They described him as a "relentlessly jolly" character with a "penchant for tight tops and quick quips". Lance has a knack for "bringing any room to life" and the only irritating thing about him is his "constant tales" about "our Leanne". Gareth McLean writing for The Guardian branded Lance and Leanne "troglodytes of the lowest order".
