= Don't Eat the Neighbours =

- Opening titles (UK)
- Also known as: Big Teeth Bad Breath
- Created by: Kirstie Falkous; Richard Robinson; Patrick Titley
- Written by: Kirstie Falkous; Michael Wynne; Gerard Foster; Andrew Bernhardt; Mary Morris; Rebecca Stevens; Elly Brewer
- Directed by: Andy de Emmony; Michael Rohl; Mark Sawers; Randy MacDonald; Tom Rowe
- Voices of: Robert Lindsay; Michael McShane; Doon Mackichan; Seán Cullen; Patrick McKenna; Tim McInnerny; Simon Callow
- Theme music composer: Sandy Nuttgens; Michael Scott; Dan Gagnon (Canadian version)
- Composers: Daryl Bennett; Jim Guttridge
- Countries of origin: United Kingdom; Canada
- Original language: English
- No. of seasons: 1

Production
- Executive producers: Anne Brogan; Steven Andrew; Christopher Brough
- Producer: Tom Rowe
- Editor: Jeremy Presner
- Production companies: Granada Kids; Sextant Entertainment

Original release
- Network: ITV (CITV); YTV (Canada)
- Release: 20 September 2001 – 9 May 2002 (Canada)
- Release: 7 January – 28 August 2002 (UK)

Don't Eat the Neighbours (also known as Big Teeth, Bad Breath) is a British-Canadian children's comedy television series that originally aired from 2001 to 2002 on ITV and YTV. Created by Granada Kids and co-produced with Sextant Entertainment, it was filmed mainly with animatronic puppets, and also used computer graphics. The series was focused on the anthropomorphic animal characters Rabbit, Wolf, and their children.

After airing in the United Kingdom and Canada up to September 2002, the show was primarily broadcast as late as 2005 on international networks. Only four episodes were given a home media release in the UK by Granada and VCI on VHS and DVD, in the 2002 volume A Rabbit for All Seasons and Other Stories.

== Premise ==
Rabbit lives in a forest in England with his best friend, Terrapin, and his three children, Lucy, Peter, and Emily, regularly raiding cabbages from Bear's garden and evading Fox. Wolf, who has been driven out of Canada by the Brotherhood of Wolves, moves in next door with his sons, Simon and Barry. Although Wolf has a strong desire to eat Rabbit, whose one fear is wolves, he forms a partnership with Fox to jointly catch him, and his children develop close friendships with Lucy, rejecting traditional dietary preferences.

== Characters ==
Where the children have normal names, the adult characters are named after the animals they are.

- Rabbit (voiced by Robert Lindsay) — Rabbit is confident, clever, and quick-witted. He is also the widowed father of Lucy, Peter, and Emily. Rabbit is tall and wears blue trousers, red Converse shoes, a white shirt, and a flowery jacket. It is mentioned in the series that Rabbit's wife was eaten by a wolf.
- Lucy (voiced by Doon Mackichan) — Rabbit's eldest child, Lucy is calm and often comes across as smarter than her father. She is good friends with Simon and Barry, despite the conflict between their fathers.
- Peter and Emily — Rabbit's youngest children are twin babies. Due to their age, they do not speak in any episodes.
- Wolf (voiced by Michael McShane) — Exiled from his native Canada by the Brotherhood of Wolves, Wolf has relocated to a forest in England where he lives next door to Rabbit. He is dim-witted and clumsy (though has occasional moments of brilliance) and partners with Fox in his attempts to catch Rabbit. Wolf is also the father of Simon and Barry, and can prove to be dangerously angry at times when it comes to planning on both hunting and killing his prey. He is tall and wears a pinkish-red shirt, black leather jacket and pants, and red platform-like shoes (which resemble women's boots). It is mentioned in the series that Wolf's wife left him for another wolf.
- Simon (voiced by Patrick McKenna) — Wolf's eldest son, Simon is smarter than his brother, Barry, though he is not all that bright himself.
- Barry (voiced by Seán Cullen) — Wolf's youngest son. Barry is good-hearted but rather dim-witted. He has a small crush on Lucy.
- Fox (voiced by Simon Callow) — Wolf's posh friend sometimes talks to his mother, who appears to be a voice inside his head. Like Wolf, Fox, too, is an enemy of Rabbit and regularly tries to eat him. Fox can be very clever when it comes to devising schemes to catch Rabbit, though Rabbit usually manages to foil his plans. He wears a white dress shirt, a yellow waistcoat, a maroon cravat, dark chartreuse pants, and brown knee-high boots.
- Terrapin (voiced by Tim McInnerny) — Rabbit's best friend. Terrapin is very cowardly and lacking in self-esteem, although there have been times where he has shown courage, and displays vain tendencies over his shell. His twin brother, Colin, looks exactly like him, save for his moustache. Terrapin wears a scuba diver's wetsuit and flippers. He is frequently referred to in the series as an amphibian, despite actually being a reptile.
- Bear (voiced by Simon Callow) — Lucy's confidant and advisor, he is usually seen painting. Everyone else in the neighbourhood is frightened of him, though he has a kindly personality.
- Sheep — The sheep in the show are often extras or Wolf's lunch and dinner, that he always tries to catch one by one if they are in his way.

== Production and broadcast ==
The series' inception began in the late 1990s, when a proposal by Richard Robinson to adapt Br'er Rabbit into a puppet-based slapstick comedy series was adopted by executive producer Patrick Titley at Yorkshire Television. Following Yorkshire's recent takeover by Granada, the concept was developed into an original programme under the writer Kirstie Falkous, initially titled Rabbit in a Hole. Upon first seeing and being impressed by the project, then-head of Granada's children's department Steven Andrew chose to prolong its production period and increase its budget by seeking an overseas co-producer, which would become Sextant Entertainment. As part of the co-production deal between Granada and Sextant, the latter received distribution and merchandising rights in North America and Japan, with those for all other territories held by Granada.

Eleven animatronic puppets for the series were designed and created by Neal Scanlan Studios during 2000. Filming and 3D animation production took place at Sextant facilities in Vancouver, Canada from April 2001, with a month-long block of voice work sessions directed by Lissa Evans prior to this at Saunders & Gordon Sound Studios in Hackney, London. Alongside 16 scripts penned by Falkous, additional material for the series was written by Michael Wynne, Andrew Bernhardt, Elly Brewer, Rebecca Stevens, Mary Morris, and Gerard Foster, under Granada development producer Connal Orton and Falkous' script producer partner John Regier. Andy de Emmony led direction of the first three episodes in Canada, alongside Michael Rohl, Mark Sawers, Randy MacDonald, and Sextant president and producer Tom Rowe. Incidental music for the show was composed by Jim Guttridge and Daryl Bennett, whilst Michael Scott and Sandy Nuttgens wrote the original theme tune and several other songs. Puppeteers included Frank Meschkuleit, with Pons Maar and Adam Behr leading their performances.

The series first premiered as Big Teeth Bad Breath in Canada on YTV, who aired 11 of the first 12 episodes and the 25th ("Old Father Rabbit") weekly from 20 September to 20 December 2001. ITV began broadcasts of the series in the United Kingdom under its original name of Don't Eat the Neighbours on 7 January 2002, airing it every weekday into the following month as part of the CITV programming strand, and subsequently premiering several of the later episodes first. YTV resumed airings of their 14 remaining episodes in Canada from 7 February, running them weekly again through to May 2002. Due to channel maintenance work on the day it was originally scheduled, the 7th episode ("Lucy and Woodland Massive") was skipped and first shown by YTV after the rest of the series had been completed in May 2002, whilst the 26th and final episode ("Rabbit's Greatest Hits") was aired by ITV once at the end of August 2002, concluding a repeat run. Repeats of the show were additionally broadcast by ITV as part of SM:TV Live during spring 2002.

Outside of several repeats of the 25th episode by YTV as part of seasonal Christmas schedules, all further broadcasts of the series after September 2002 were made by international networks as late as 2005, including RTÉ2, ABC Kids, TVB Pearl, Kids Central, France5, MBC 1, Yle TV2, and TV4. French, Finnish and Swedish dubs as Ne croque pas tes voisins, Herkulliset naapurit, and Ät inte grannen respectively were made for the latter four channels.

Shortly after all 26 episodes had been shown in Canada, Sextant Entertainment entered receivership. Merchandise for the series was reportedly planned in 2002, but did not materialise. One home media release containing four episodes ("A Rabbit for All Seasons", "Colin Pays a Visit", "Lucy the Adventurer" and "Lucy Blows Her Top") was released for VHS and DVD by Granada and VCI in the United Kingdom on 26 August 2002. Assorted clips from a number of episodes were later uploaded to YouTube by ITV to the 'ITV Children's Classics' channel in the 2010s. The series has not been officially distributed since.

== Episodes ==
No.	Title	Directed by	Written by	Original release date (Canada)	Original release date (United Kingdom)
1	"A Rabbit for All Seasons"	Andy de Emmony	Kirstie Falkous	September 20, 2001	January 7, 2002
Wolf is exiled from Canada with his sons Simon and Barry, and emigrates to England. Rabbit is out raiding cabbages with Terrapin in Bear's garden, unaware that Wolf has moved in next door to his home. Upon finding out about their arrival, he panics to the bemusement of his daughter Lucy. Wolf partners up for the first time with Fox to catch Rabbit, but they are swiftly outsmarted by him disguising Terrapin in a casserole dish, who escapes and causes them to fall down their trap hole.
2	"Action Rabbit"	Andy de Emmony	Kirstie Falkous	September 27, 2001	January 8, 2002
Lucy is enticed by an advertisement for the new Action Rabbit artillery tank toy, and purchases one without her father's knowledge. Dismayed by its violent realism, he attempts to teach her several lessons as he sees fit. Meanwhile, Wolf and Fox get distracted by Simon and Barry's video games.
3	"Barry Loves Lucy"	Andy de Emmony	Kirstie Falkous	October 4, 2001	January 9, 2002
Upon seeing a film with romance at the cinema, Barry comes to terms with his crush on Lucy, who does not reciprocate any of his efforts to woo her. She is more focused on trying to fill the void left behind by her mother at home, but hires a 'rabbit nanny' who is not what they seem to be.
4	"Simon the Werewolf"	Mark Sawers	Kirstie Falkous	October 11, 2001	January 10, 2002
After watching a horror movie with Barry, Simon has nightmares of being a sheep-eating werewolf, and starts to wrongly believe he is becoming one. Meanwhile, Fox tries and fails to catch Rabbit again with a cabbage trap, which unbeknownst to him has already been switched around by his prey.
5	"Walk Like a Rabbit"	Mark Sawers	Kirstie Falkous	October 18, 2001	January 11, 2002
Lucy, Simon and Barry argue over the ownership of a treehouse that they are jointly constructing in the woodland. Wolf and Rabbit seize the opportunity to try and show them the differences between rabbits and wolves, by organising various exercise challenges out in the forest at night.
6	"Trust Rabbit"	Mark Sawers	Elly Brewer	October 25, 2001	January 14, 2002
Rabbit reads through Lucy's diary, where she has indicated her crush on the two members of sheep pop duo Woolly Bully, who she is soon seeing in concert. Due to her only writing their initials of 'S'hanks and 'B'arney, he jumps to the wrong conclusions about them being Simon and Barry.
7	"Lucy and Woodland Massive"	Mark Sawers	Rebecca Stevens	May 9, 2002	January 15, 2002
Simon falls in with a group of unruly gangster sheep out in the woodland, and attempts to get Barry to join them too. Lucy tries to dissuade him by making up an untrue story about her being in the gang and stealing a pair of trainers, whilst Rabbit and Terrapin and Fox and Wolf make jam.
8	"Vote For Lucy"	Mark Sawers	Kirstie Falkous	November 8, 2001	January 16, 2002
Simon and Barry prepare a bid for school president with the help of their father and Fox, who quickly realise that Lucy is also competing. Rabbit and Wolf exchange respective bets of dressing up in wolf fan clothing or a Red Riding Hood costume in the event their child loses the contest.
9	"Wolves in from the Cold"	Randy MacDonald	Andrew Bernhardt	November 15, 2001	January 17, 2002
When Wolf refuses to buy Simon and Barry a new video game, the two plot a fake kidnapping of themselves to get the money. Meanwhile, Lucy accidentally breaks Rabbit's cabbage-raiding champion trophy and blames Terrapin for the incident, making him contemplate leaving home.
10	"Dances With Terrapin"	Randy MacDonald	Kirstie Falkous	November 22, 2001	January 18, 2002
Lucy tries to learn ballroom dancing to earn a badge at her Forest Brigade group meets, and has to turn to Bear for help with her practise whilst Terrapin and her father are busy. At the same time, Fox and Wolf go through complications in their failing partnership to catch Rabbit.
11	"Terrapin's Hot Date"	Michael Rohl	Gerard Foster	February 14, 2002	January 21, 2002
Terrapin happens upon a Valentine's Day card and date invitation from a secret admirer, who turns out to be another one of Fox's elaborate schemes to catch Rabbit with Wolf. Meanwhile, Lucy aims to enter a couple's karaoke competition, but struggles to find a partner to join her.
12	"Fox Comes to Stay"	Michael Rohl	Mary Morris	November 29, 2001	January 22, 2002
Fox moves into Wolf's home in an apparent effort to teach him manners and win him membership in the exclusive 'Canine Club', disrupting the family dynamic with Simon and Barry. Lucy loses her lucky charm ahead of a school exam, and Rabbit tries to give her a new one.
13	"Colin Pays a Visit"	Randy MacDonald	Kirstie Falkous	December 6, 2001	January 23, 2002
Terrapin's famous identical actor twin Colin sends a letter to say he will be visiting home soon, exciting Rabbit and Lucy. To improve his low self-esteem, Terrapin successfully masquerades as him, but Colin cancels his visit, and his friends realise they have taken him for granted.
14	"Lucy the Adventurer"	Randy MacDonald	Kirstie Falkous	February 7, 2002	January 24, 2002
Lucy strives to become more independent from her family by going camping on her own, to the disapproval of Rabbit. She convinces him she can by doing her own cooking and cleaning, but is nonetheless secretly followed by him and Terrapin when she leaves home for the forest.
15	"Dave Eats the Grass"	Mark Sawers	Kirstie Falkous	February 21, 2002	January 25, 2002
Rabbit falls out with Terrapin when he fails to catch a cabbage thrown to him in the midst of an ambush by Wolf and Fox. Lucy tries to mediate between the two, whilst Rabbit finds a new sheep friend. Wolf also begins to question his relationship with Fox after reading a tabloid article.
16	"Barry's Close Encounter"	Mark Sawers	Rebecca Stevens	February 28, 2002	January 28, 2002
Barry believes he has seen aliens out in the woodland at night after a vivid dream, and refuses to come back home until he has found them again. Lucy temporarily lets him stay at her house and tries to help him in shooting footage of another encounter, which convinces the others.
17	"Happy Birthday Mr Rabbit"	Michael Rohl	Kirstie Falkous	March 7, 2002	January 29, 2002
Rabbit starts to feel the effects of a mid-life aging crisis, upon failing to appreciate his daughter's present on his birthday. Wolf self-consciously tries to appear cooler in front of his sons, but does not excite them until he chases after Rabbit, interrupting his outdoor kung-fu session.
18	"Terrapin on the Rocks"	Michael Rohl	Kirstie Falkous	March 14, 2002	January 30, 2002
A sudden heatwave-induced drought throws the woodland community into an emergency situation. Wolf tries to make it rain and experiences strange dehydration dreams, and Rabbit and Terrapin attempt to solve the problem by locating an old abandoned well near Bear's house.
19	"Super Terrapin"	Randy MacDonald	Michael Wynne	March 21, 2002	January 31, 2002
Terrapin accidentally saves a drowning sheep from a near-death experience. The local media quickly starts to treat him as a superhero, which Wolf and Fox try to take advantage of. Rabbit grows jealous of his friend's new-found attention, and makes a play at stealing the credit.
20	"Lucy Blows Her Top"	Randy MacDonald	Kirstie Falkous	March 28, 2002	February 1, 2002
Lucy falls out with Simon and Barry after their joint school science experiment goes wrong, rudely insulting them. Rabbit is excited by his daughter's new disapproval of wolves, and the two come up with a prank phone call that will fully excommunicate Wolf from his species' brotherhood.
21	"Wolf's Grave Fears"	Randy MacDonald	Elly Brewer	April 4, 2002	February 4, 2002
Wolf is afraid he is in poor health, and prepares a list of final wishes in the event of his death. Fox assists him in achieving them, whilst Simon and Barry enter a toy raffle, and Terrapin and Lucy campaign for their favorite soap opera character to survive his unknown deadly illness.
22	"Terrapin Out of His Shell"	Randy MacDonald	Kirstie Falkous	April 11, 2002	February 5, 2002
Terrapin fails to warn Rabbit of an imminent run-in with Wolf and Fox, and abandons his friend out of fear. He withdraws back into his shell over the shame from the incident, but is eventually coaxed back out by Rabbit and Lucy, who enlist him to forage more food by faking a leg injury.
23	"Lucy Faces the Music"	Tom Rowe	Gerard Foster	April 18, 2002	February 6, 2002
Lucy is given a trumpet to play by school. Her father believes she can take after her grandmother's supposed talents with it, but she immediately finds out she does not. Rabbit refuses to believe this, and buys her an expensive trumpet of her own, financed by him getting a job at the shop.
24	"Simon Acts Up"	Tom Rowe	Elly Brewer	April 25, 2002	February 7, 2002
Lucy and Simon both vie for the lead parts in their school play, but only the latter lands his, with Lucy receiving a smaller supporting role. Though initially jealous, she helps him with practising his lines after finding them difficult, and upstages the sheep in the play to impress Rabbit.
25	"Old Father Rabbit"	Randy MacDonald	Kirstie Falkous	December 20, 2001	February 8, 2002
Lucy asks for a new bike for Rabbit Day, however her father forgets to buy presents. In a desperate late in the day move, Rabbit and the neighbours come together to get the gifts themselves.
26	"Rabbit's Greatest Hits"	Randy MacDonald	Kirstie Falkous	May 2, 2002	August 28, 2002
Feeling underappreciated over the times he has been mistreated, Terrapin locks himself in Rabbit's bathroom and refuses to come out. Wolf also hides away by camping out in the treehouse.
