= Springhill (TV series) =

- Genre: Black comedy; Fantasy drama; Soap opera
- Created by: Paul Abbott; Frank Cottrell Boyce; Russell T Davies
- Starring: Gilly Coman; Katharine Rogers; Christine Tremarco; Sharon Byatt; Judy Holt; Crissy Rock
- Country of origin: United Kingdom
- Original language: English
- No. of series: 2
- No. of episodes: 52

Production
- Running time: 30 minutes
- Production company: Granada Television

Original release
- Network: Sky One; Channel 4
- Release: 1 October 1996 – 18 June 1997

Springhill is a British soap opera created by Paul Abbott, produced by Granada Television, and broadcast from 1 October 1996 to 18 June 1997 on the Sky One satellite channel, and later on Channel 4. It consisted of 2 series, each containing 26 episodes.

Set in Liverpool, Springhill based its main theme on the battle between good and evil, entwined around a complex family drama. Issues covered included adoption revelation, genetic sexual attraction, bigamy, homosexuality, infertility, surrogacy and murder. Aside from this there was a supernatural aspect, which included elements of religion, Angels, apparitions, witchcraft, time travel and the Second Coming of Christ.

== Cast ==
- Gilly Coman as Liz Freeman
- Jonathan Barlow as Jack Freeman
- Katharine Rogers as Eva Morrigan
- Scot Williams (series 1) and Stephen Donald (series 2) as Nick Freeman
- Sharon Byatt as Sue Freeman
- Christine Tremarco as Trish Freeman
- Kevin Knapman as Anthony Freeman
- Paul Culshaw as John Paul Freeman
- Stephen Walters (series 1) and Matthew Dunster (series 2) as Jamie Johnson
- Bill Speed as Father Peter McGinley
- Vickie Gates as Meryl Cartlege
- Crissy Rock as Anita Cartlege
- Samantha Lavelle as Pat Lombard
- Paul Warriner as Greg Metcalfe
- Emma Lucy Vaudrey as Greta Mullaney
- Claire Robinson as Debbie Nixon
- Judy Holt as Marian (series 2)

== DVD releases ==
The first series of Springhill was released on Region 1 DVD on 18 June 2013. The second season has not had any official release.
