= Vickie Gates (actress) =

British actress

Vickie Gates is a British actress, best known for the roles of Leanne Powell in Brookside and Marilyn Chambers in The Bill. Between her initial stint as Leanne in 1993 and her return in 1997 (before a permanent return in 2000), Gates was in an all-girl pop band called Dream Reality. She has also appeared in the TV series Springhill, City Central and Liverpool 1.

She has supplemented her television work with appearances in the film The Last Straw and appearing in the Vagina Monologues. Other TV appearances have included Abbamania 2 and as the winner of Celebrity Stars in Their Eyes for ITV. In 2013, she played Pat in the BBC comedy-drama Being Eileen.

== Acting credits ==
=== Screen roles ===
Year	Title	Role	Network/Studio	Notes
1992–93, 1997, 2000–03	Brookside	Leanne Powell	Mersey Television	Series regular
1996–97	Springhill	Meryl Cartlege	Granada / Sky One	14 episodes
1998	City Central	Sarah Cartwright	BBC	Episode: "Life and Death"
1999	Liverpool 1	Mandy	ITV	Episode: "Pause for Thought"
1999	The Last Straw	Businesswoman		Short film
1999	Going Off Big Time	Honey Trap	KT Films	Feature film
2002	The Ice Cream Jesus	Sister Mike		Short film
2002	The Boy from Ipanema	June McDonagh		Short film
2002	Back in Its Place	Grace Roberts		Short film
2003–05	The Bill	Marilyn Chambers	Thames Television	Series regular
2004	Abbamania 2	Performer	Granada	TV special
2007	Mobile	Victim on Train	ITV	1 episode
2013	Being Eileen	Pat	BBC	Episode: "Homeless"

=== Stage roles ===
Year	Title	Role	Notes
1994	David Essex's Back To Front British Tour	Support/Backing Singer	
1995	Dream Reality	Girl-Group Member	
2002	The Vagina Monologues		Neptune Theatre, Liverpool
