= Julia Jekyll and Harriet Hyde =

British TV series

- Country of origin: United Kingdom
- Original language: English
- No. of series: 3
- No. of episodes: 53

Production
- Running time: 14 minutes

Original release
- Network: CBBC
- Release: 29 September 1995 – 2 April 1998

Julia Jekyll and Harriet Hyde was a British children's television series which aired on BBC One (via Children's BBC and later CBBC) in the UK for 53 episodes between 29 September 1995 and 2 April 1998.

The programme was a comedy with its premise being loosely based on Robert Louis Stevenson's Gothic 1886 novella, Strange Case of Dr Jekyll and Mr Hyde.

== Plot ==
Olivia Hallinan plays an intelligent schoolgirl named Julia Jekyll who makes a special drink called an elixir for a science project, but two school bullies named Nicola and Sharon known as "The Blister Sisters" sabotage her experiment by adding a hair restoring formula to it. When Julia sips the drink during a demonstration, she turns into a huge hairy monster named Harriet Hyde that scares the living daylights out of most of the people around her, even though she is harmless and friendly to most. Julia's parents Jerry and Moira (who has a tendency to repeat herself literally whenever someone says "You can say that again.") are fond of Harriet and believe she is Julia's friend, not knowing that Harriet and Julia are one and the same. However their next-door neighbours, Jason and Mona Jitter, a neurotic couple who spent most of their time at a therapist's, are terrified of Harriet and have numerous unfortunate encounters with her. The Blister sisters repeatedly plot to get rid of Harriet but usually end up on the receiving end of her wrath, mostly being flung headfirst across the room.

The effects of Harriet Hyde usually wear off after a while but unexpectedly keep coming back. Julia's best friend and fellow student from Rocket Academy, Edward Knickers is the only one who knows her secret and she has hard work trying to hide it from her parents, next door neighbours, the teachers and all the other fellow students whilst she tries to find a cure. Julia can often recognise when she is about to transform into Harriet and manages to hide away from everyone else (for example by pretending she is going to be sick and having to leave the room). Teachers at the Rocket Academy were the jolly hippie headmaster Memphis Rocket, his doting elderly mother who is a horrendous cook, and Lester Blister, the Blister sisters' cruel and scheming uncle who wishes to take over the school.

== Main cast ==
Actor	Role	Series
Olivia Hallinan	Julia Jekyll	1-3
Olivia Hallinan	Harriet Hyde (voice)	1-3
John Asquith	Harriet Hyde	1-3
Victoria Williams	Moira Jekyll (credited as Mum)	1-3
Bill Fellows	Jerry Jekyll (credited as Dad)	1-2
Ian Keith	Jerry Jekyll (credited as Dad)	3
Simon Green	Memphis Rocket	1-3
Ann Emery	Stella Rocket (credited as Mrs Rocket)	1-3
Robert Portal	Lester Blister	1
Dale Rapley	Lester Blister	2-3
Tiffany Griffiths	Nicola Blister	1-3
Karen Salt	Sharon Blister	1-3
Christine Lohr	Mrs Smith	1-3
Guy Edwards	Edward Knickers	1-2
Steven Webb	Edward Knickers	3
Susie Brann	Mona Jitter	2-3
John Elmes	Jason Jitter	2-3

== Episodes ==
=== Series 1 (1995-1996) ===
No. overall	No. in series	Title	Written by	Original release date
1	1	"Julia's Elixir"	Jeremy Swan	29 September 1995
After a school experiment goes horribly wrong, Julia finds herself turning into a monstrous creature called Harriet Hyde.
2	2	"A Fright For Aunt Cassandra"	Jeremy Swan	6 October 1995
Julia's bossy aunt Cassandra comes to visit. Meanwhile, Mr and Mrs Rocket are awaiting the arrival of a school inspector. Featuring: Lynda Bellingham as Aunt Cassandra
3	3	"Beauty and the Beast"	Jeremy Swan	13 October 1995
Julia is selected to play the role of Beauty in the Rocket Academy's production of 'Beauty and the Beast'.
4	4	"Horror at the Waxworks"	Jeremy Swan	20 October 1995
The pupils of the Rocket Academy go on a school trip to a waxwork museum.
5	5	"Emmeline Pond Takes Charge"	Jim Eldridge	27 October 1995
Emmeline Pond, the new chairperson of the school governors, takes over the Rocket Academy. Featuring: Anna Kirke as Emmeline Pond
6	6	"A Dragon in the Living Room"	Jim Eldridge	3 November 1995
A businessman called Tim Tok Lim is interested in Julia's elixir, and is invited to the Jekyll's home for dinner to test it. Featuring: David Y. Cheung as Tim Tok Lim
7	7	"Not Yeti"	Jim Eldridge	10 November 1995
A photographer called Sid Snap arrives at the Rocket Academy after a yeti is sighted on the premises. Featuring: Scott Harvey as Sid Snap
8	8	"The Fingers of Mrs Figgis"	Jim Eldridge	17 November 1995
The Jekyll's new cleaner, Mrs Figgis, steals valuable items from the family, including Jerry's prized bravery award. Featuring: Josie Kidd as Mrs Figgis
9	9	"Love Is in the Air"	Jeremy Swan	24 November 1995
Julia's cousin Daffodil becomes infatuated with Julia's science teacher, Lester Blister. Meanwhile, Mr Rocket must make a choice between his new girlfriend, Amber Python, and his mother. Featuring: Natasha Grey as Daffodil Jekyll, Natalie Forbes as Amber Python
10	10	"Sister Blister"	Jim Eldridge	1 December 1995
Lester Blister enlists the help of his sister in order to determine if Harriet Hyde is a robot. Featuring: Richenda Carey as Sister Blister
11	11	"Hard Rocket Café"	Jim Eldridge	8 December 1995
The Rocket Academy is looking for a new cook after Mrs Rocket nearly poisons Lester Blister. Featuring: David Sterne as Willy Burnitt
12	12	"Gorilla in the Midst"	Jim Eldridge	15 December 1995
A gorilla named Guido escapes from the local zoo and begins terrorising the Rocket Academy.
13	13	"Gardener's Horror Time"	Jim Eldridge	22 December 1995
Mr Rocket buys a plant for his mother's birthday, but a mishap with one of Julia's experiments causes it to grow uncontrollably.
14	14	"Going to the Dogs"	Jim Eldridge	5 January 1996
Julia believes that she has accidentally turned Mr Rocket into a dog.
15	15	"The New Boy"	Jeremy Swan	12 January 1996
A new pupil, Edward Knickers, arrives at the Rocket Academy, and he and Julia quickly strike up a friendship. First appearance of: Guy Edwards as Edward Knickers
16	16	"Home Sweet Home"	Jim Eldridge	19 January 1996
After receiving an abysmal school report, Mr Rocket decides to take the pupils of the Rocket Academy to Julia's house in the hopes that some of her cleverness will rub off on the other pupils.
17	17	"Big Bunny"	Jim Eldridge	26 January 1996
Edward's new antidote has the unexpected effect of causing Julia's pet rabbit to grow to an enormous size.
18	18	"Framed"	Jim Eldridge	2 February 1996
Julia is expelled from the Rocket Academy after the Blister Sisters frame her for something she did not do.
19	19	"Stuck on Harriet"	Jim Eldridge	9 February 1996
Julia becomes stuck as Harriet and has to spend the evening working late at the Rocket Academy.
20	20	"Aliens"	Jim Eldridge	16 February 1996
Mr Rocket suspects the Jekyll family of being aliens.
21	21	"Mrs Rocket's Diamonds"	Jim Eldridge	23 February 1996
Mrs Rocket inherits a giant diamond, which Mr Blister is very keen to get hold of.
22	22	"Danger - Ball of Fluff"	Jim Eldridge	1 March 1996
An experiment gone wrong leads to Julia turning into a small ball of fluff.
23	23	"Roman All Over"	Jim Eldridge	8 March 1996
Julia discovers some ancient Roman pottery in the yard of the Rocket Academy.
24	24	"Mr And Mrs Hyde"	Jim Eldridge	15 March 1996
The teachers of the Rocket Academy are terrified of meeting Harriet's parents. Last appearance of: Robert Portal as Lester Blister

=== Series 2 (1996) ===
No. overall	No. in series	Title	Written by	Original release date
25	1	"Little Mrs Rocket"	Jeremy Swan	12 September 1996
Mrs Rocket accidentally drinks one of Julia's experiments and shrinks. First appearance of: Dale Rapley as Lester Blister
26	2	"The Magic Cabinet of Mr Rocket"	Jeremy Swan	19 September 1996
Mr Rocket becomes interested in magic. Meanwhile, Mona and Jason Jitter move in next door to the Jekylls. First appearance of: Susie Brann as Mona Jitter, John Elmes as Jason Jitter
27	3	"The New Caretaker"	Jeremy Swan	26 September 1996
Mrs Rocket's long lost brother, Alf Sparkle, arrives at the Rocket Academy, and is given the job of caretaker. Featuring: Christopher Biggins as Alf Sparkle
28	4	"Top Kids"	Jim Eldridge	3 October 1996
Julia is chosen to participate in a radio quiz. Featuring: Dave Benson Phillips as himself (credited as 'Quiz person' in Radio Times)
29	5	"I-Spy"	Jim Eldridge	10 October 1996
Mr Rocket hears that the school inspector has placed a spy in the Rocket Academy, and is determined to find out who it is.
30	6	"Young Musician of the Century"	Jeremy Swan	17 October 1996
Julia takes up playing the piano, and is entered into the 'Young Musician of the Century' competition.
31	7	"The Big Prize"	Jim Eldridge	24 October 1996
Jason enters his prized marrow in a competition.
32	8	"Granny Jekyll"	Jim Eldridge	31 October 1996
Julia's grandmother comes to visit. Featuring: Lila Kaye as Granny Jekyll
33	9	"In The Net"	Jim Eldridge	7 November 1996
A famous goalkeeper, Benny Blister, is coming to visit the Rocket Academy. Featuring: Michael Cantwell as Benny Blister
34	10	"Not All There"	Jim Eldridge	14 November 1996
Harriet Hyde becomes invisible after Julia's experiment goes wrong. Featuring: Scott Harvey as Sid Snap
35	11	"Love's Light Fingers"	Jim Eldridge	21 November 1996
Mr Rocket becomes engaged to the Jekyll's former kleptomaniac housekeeper, Mrs Figgis. Featuring: Josie Kidd as Mrs Figgis
36	12	"The French Connection"	Jim Eldridge	28 November 1996
The Rocket Academy sets up a foreign exchange with a school in France.
37	13	"Secrets"	Jim Eldridge	5 December 1996
Mrs Rocket organises a surprise party for Mr Rocket to celebrate his tenth anniversary of being headteacher of the Rocket Academy.
38	14	"Famed"	Jeremy Swan	12 December 1996
The Rocket Academy is selected to appear on television.
39	15	"A Rocket Christmas"	Jim Eldridge	19 December 1996
The Christmas party at the Rocket Academy is thrown into jeopardy when Santa Claus cancels his appearance. Last appearance of: Bill Fellows as Jerry Jekyll, Guy Edwards as Edward Knickers

=== Series 3 (1998) ===
No. overall	No. in series	Title	Written by	Original release date
40	1	"Invitations To Harriet"	Jeremy Swan	8 January 1998
Julia and Harriet are invited to come to tea by Mr and Mrs Rocket, Jason and Mona Jitter and her parents. First appearance of: Ian Keith as Jerry Jekyll, Steven Webb as Edward Knickers
41	2	"Tiddles"	Jim Eldridge	15 January 1998
The Blister Sisters release a snake into the Rocket Academy, while Mr Rocket brings in a private investigator to find out why food keeps going missing. Featuring: Scott Harvey as Sid Snap
42	3	"Julia's Birthday"	Jeremy Swan	22 January 1998
The Rocket Academy try to show their appreciation of Julia on her birthday.
43	4	"Astro-Nuts"	Jim Eldridge	29 January 1998
Sister Blister is brought into the Rocket Academy in order to test Mr Rocket's suitability to become an astronaut. Featuring: Richenda Carey as Sister Blister
44	5	"Best Girl"	Jeremy Swan	5 February 1998
Julia is made Head Girl of the Rocket Academy. A terrified Mr Rocket is worried that Harriet will become jealous, and goes into hiding.
45	6	"I'm Henry VIII I Am"	Jim Eldridge	12 February 1998
Henry VIII unexpectedly appears at the Rocket Academy. Featuring: Martyn Ellis as Henry VIII
46	7	"Aggro"	Jeremy Swan	19 February 1998
Tensions are running high between the Jitters and the Jekylls, as well as between the staff of the Rocket Academy.
47	8	"Dear Aunt Aggie"	Jim Eldridge	26 February 1998
Julia's mum takes a job at the local newspaper as their new agony aunt.
48	9	"The Duke And Duchess of Rocket"	Jeremy Swan	5 March 1998
Mr and Mrs Rocket discover they are descended from aristocracy.
49	10	"With A Smile and a Song"	Jim Eldridge	12 March 1998
The Rocket Academy are holding a talent contest, and Julia's grandmother is encouraged to enter. Featuring: Lila Kaye as Granny Jekyll
50	11	"Half Half Term"	Jeremy Swan	19 March 1998
Due to budgetary constraints at the Rocket Academy, the teachers have to take part-time jobs during the half term.
51	12	"Which Witch?"	Jim Eldridge	26 March 1998
Julia is suspected of being a witch after she is seen flying.
52	13	"Fangs"	Jim Eldridge	31 March 1998
Mr Blister takes up a part-time job as a vampire kissogram.
53	14	"Mrs Rocket and the Mermaid Potion"	Jeremy Swan	2 April 1998
The Blister Sisters sabotage another of Julia's experiments, leading to unintended consequences for Mrs Rocket.
