= Michael Wynne (playwright) =

British playwright, screenwriter (active 1996-)

Michael Wynne is an English playwright and screenwriter.

== Early life ==
Wynne was born in Birkenhead, Merseyside. He attended St Peter's Primary School and St Benedict's Secondary School. He studied Politics at Queen Mary College, University of London.

== Career ==
Wynne wrote his first play The Knocky in his final year at University. It was produced by the Royal Court Theatre, taken on tour and subsequently performed at Liverpool's Everyman Theatre. It won the 1996 Meyer Whitworth Award, Best New Talent - Liverpool Echo Arts Awards and he was nominated as Best New Writer by the Writers Guild. Wynne has had eight plays produced by the Royal Court - The Knocky, The People Are Friendly, The Priory, The Red Flag, Friday Night Sex (co-written and directed with Alecky Blythe) Who Cares, I'm Not Here for The Living Newspaper and Cuckoo. The Priory won the Olivier Award for Best New Comedy. He has worked with four Royal Court artistic directors - Steven Daldry, Ian Rickson, Dominic Cooke and Vicky Featherstone.

Other plays include Sell Out and Dirty Wonderland for Frantic Assembly. The Boy Who Left Home for Actors Touring Company/Lyric Theatre Hammersmith. Tits/Teeth for the National Youth Theatre and Soho Theatre. Canvas for the Minerva Theatre, Chichester.

Wynne wrote Too Cold For Snow for Prada at the Prada Foundation in Milan. It starred Cillian Murphy, Kelly Reilly, Rupert Penry-Jones, Hans Matheson, Paul Fox and was directed by Vicky Featherstone. He took part in the first 24 Hour Plays at the Old Vic Theatre and wrote Cuba which starred Penelope Wilton, Harriet Walter, Alex Jennings and Susan Lynch and closed the night. He wrote and directed the play/film Collider about CERN, The Large Hadron Collider and the search for the Higgs Boson for the Science Museum, London and subsequent world tour.

Wynne wrote Hope Place for the Everyman Theatre, Liverpool. It was the first new play to be performed in the newly rebuilt Everyman Theatre and is the Everyman Theatre's best selling new play to date. He also wrote The Star for the Liverpool Playhouse, to celebrate the 150th anniversary of the Playhouse Theatre which was originally The Star Music Hall.

Wynne’s plays are published by Faber and Faber.

Wynne co-wrote the film My Summer of Love (with Pawel Pawlikowski) which starred Emily Blunt and Natalie Press. It won the BAFTA for Best British Film and Best Screenplay - Evening Standard Awards.

He has written for television including Where The Heart Is, Grafters, As If, Sugar Rush and Eyes Down. He wrote the film Lapland for BBC1 and was shown on Christmas Eve in 2011 as part of the BBC1 Christmas schedule. It starred Sue Johnston, Steven Graham, Elizabeth Berrington, Julie Graham, William Ash and Zawe Ashton. He subsequently wrote the six part spin off series Being Eileen for BBC1.

He wrote the Little Crackers installment "The Daltons", starring Sheridan Smith, about Smith's childhood, for Sky One.

== List of works ==
=== Theatre ===
- The Knocky – The Royal Court Theatre
- The Boy Who Left Home – Lyric Theatre, Hammersmith
- Sell Out – Frantic Assembly
- Too Cold For Snow – The Prada Foundation
- The People Are Friendly – The Royal Court Theatre
- Dirty Wonderland – Frantic Assembly
- Tits/Teeth – Soho Theatre
- The Priory – The Royal Court Theatre
- The Red Flag – The Royal Court Theatre
- Canvas – Minerva Theatre, Chichester
- Friday Night Sex (co written with Alecky Blythe) - The Royal Court Theatre
- Hope Place- Everyman Theatre, Liverpool
- Who Cares - The Royal Court Theatre
- The Star - Liverpool Playhouse
- We Are Here - La Mama, New York
- I'm Not Here - The Royal Court Theatre
- Cuckoo - The Royal Court Theatre and Liverpool Everyman
- DiscoShow - Caesars Palace, Caesars Entertainment, Las Vegas

=== Television includes ===
- Where The Heart Is - ITV
- Grafters - ITV
- As If - Channel 4
- UGetMe - BBC1
- Substance - BBC3
- Don't Eat The Neighbours - ITV
- Eyes Down - BBC1
- The Catherine Tate Show - BBC2
- Sugar Rush - Channel 4
- Mayo - BBC1
- EastEnders - BBC1
- Lapland / Being Eileen - BBC1
- The Daltons - Sky

== Awards ==
- Meyer Whitworth Award- Best New Playwright The Knocky
- Best New Talent - Liverpool Echo Arts Awards - The Knocky
- Best New Writer Nomination - Writers Guild - The Knocky
- Best Off West End Play - Time Out Theatre Awards - Sell Out
- Best New Comedy Nomination - Whatsonstage Awards - The People Are Friendly
- BAFTA Best British Film - My Summer of Love
- Best Screenplay - Evening Standard Film Awards - My Summer of Love
- Michael Powell Award for Best British Film at the Edinburgh Film Festival - My Summer of Love
- Best New Comedy Nomination - Whatsonstage Awards - The Priory
- Olivier Award - Best New Comedy - The Priory

Wynne has been writer on attachment at the Royal Court Theatre and National Theatre. He has led many playwriting groups and workshops, both nationally and internationally – Mexico, Ghana, Australia, United States (UCLA and Stanford). He was the Senior Playwright Tutor on the MA Creative Writing: Playwriting at Salford University working with students and writers from the Liverpool Everyman, Manchester Royal Exchange and Bolton Octagon.
