= Victoria Williams (actress) =

British actress

- Occupation: Actress
- Years active: 1973–2005

Victoria Williams is a British actress. She started her career at the end of the sixties as a child actor and played various roles in different TV drama productions. Her most notable part (then credited as "Vicky Williams") was that of Nicky Gore, the central character of the 1975 adaptation of Peter Dickinson's The Changes, a trilogy that chronicled the sudden and violent descent by British society into a pre-industrial and pre-technological age.

She was one of the two human actors in the Children's ITV series, The Riddlers, about two humanoid creatures who lived in her garden, which ran from 1989 to 1998. She played the role of Marjorie Dawe.

Her other roles include appearances in films such as It Could Happen to You (1975), Bedrooms and Hallways (1998), Hear the Silence (2003, as Tessa Jowell) and MirrorMask (2005), and television series including Dombey and Son, Coronation Street, Crown Court, Rooms, The Mallens, Holby City, Leave it to Charlie and Julia Jekyll and Harriet Hyde (as Moira Jekyll).
