= British and Irish Meteorite Society =

Organization

- Logo courtesy Mark Ford
- Abbreviation: BIMS
- Formation: 2004; 22 years ago
- Members: 150+
- Founders: Mark Ford & Dave Harris
- Website: www.bimsociety.org

The British and Irish Meteorite Society (BIMS) is a group of over 150 meteorite researchers and amateurs. The BIMS was formed in 2004 by the meteorite collectors Mark Ford and Dave Harris. The group provides a meteorite collecting and study focus for the UK and Ireland, and is the only meteorite group in the UK and one of only three in the entire world. Members have made many major scientific discoveries, including the finding of a rare 17.6 kilograms (39 lb) pallasite meteorite, in Hambleton, Yorkshire, in 2005. Several members assisted in the search for the Winchcombe meteorite in 2021. Through its website, the society maintains two forums, one for the general public and one for its members. Additionally, the society has a Facebook group. The forums and group act as a central point for the exchange of meteorite related information in the UK.

== Accomplishments ==
- In 2005 the Society donated a substantial meteorite collection to South Downs Planetarium in Chichester England, which was received by Sir Patrick Moore, and since then has donated material for study to many institutions.
- Many talks, lectures and exhibitions have been given by society members, and BIMS was a founding participant in the Brighton Science Festival event.
- In 2006 a fireball response system was established, with the intention of recovering any space rock material which lands within the UK, the main aim is to ensure material is preserved for scientific study.
- In October 2008 the Society attended 'Impact Day' at the Institute of Astronomy in Cambridge. This prestigious event attracted delegates from all over Europe, and included lectures by members Dr Caroline Smith (NHM), David Bryant (Spacerocks UK) and Dave Harris (BIMS).
- In September 2012 the Society attended the Natural History Museum London's 'Meteorite Day'.

== See also ==
- Glossary of meteoritics
- Meteorite
- Bolide
- Chondrite
