= The Riddlers =

- Genre: Children's television series
- Starring: Victoria Williams; Richard Robinson
- Country of origin: United Kingdom
- Original language: English
- No. of seasons: 9
- No. of episodes: 224

Production
- Executive producer: Chris Jelley
- Production location: Yorkshire Television Studios
- Camera setup: Multi-camera
- Running time: 15 minutes
- Production company: Yorkshire Television

Original release
- Network: ITV
- Release: 2 November 1989 – 27 August 1998

The Riddlers is a British children's programme produced by Yorkshire Television for ITV between 2 November 1989 and 27 August 1998.

== Synopsis ==
The series centred on Marjorie Dawe and the two Riddlers (small humanoid creatures, portrayed by puppets, whose main aim in life was to "riddle things out") named Mossop (voiced by Richard Robinson) and Tiddler (female, but voiced by Mike Gallant), who inhabited her garden at Riddleton End. It would later be revealed that Tiddler was an orphan and had no other next of kin, so Mossop adopted Tiddler as an infant. Tiddler was not the latter's real name, but a title given to young apprentice Riddlers: once they achieved full Riddler status there would be a special (graduation type) ceremony, at which they would be given their 'real' name. Tiddler's training included being told twelve stories by a Riddlestone, usually one of 'Eesup's Foibles' (Yorkshire dialect for Aesop's Fables) – she would then have to 'riddle out' the moral of the story.

When Tiddler had achieved full Riddler status (by getting the morals of twelve stories correctly) she chose to be called Tiddlup at the ceremony. Marjorie wanted to go to the ceremony but was told by Mossop that only Riddlers and Tiddlers could go as it was a Riddler law. In order to go, she became a Riddler and started to study as a Riddler.

Other characters featured in the show included Marjorie's neighbour, Mr. Montgomery Lancelot Grimley (a gardener and odd-job man); Postie, a hedgehog who delivered letters to the Riddlers; and several other Riddler characters, including another Tiddler known as Middler, Mossop's brother Glossop, and Eesup, a story-teller. Marjorie's sister Monica was also featured as a recurring character.

== Series cast ==
- Miss Marjorie Dawe: Victoria Williams
- Mr. Montgomery Grimley: Peter Llewellyn-Jones
- Monica Dawe: Sally Sheridan
- Mossop/Middler: Richard Robinson
- Tiddlup/Postie/Glossop/Eesup/McEyup: Mike Gallant

== Production ==
224 episodes were produced and broadcast during the series' nine-year run. For much of its run, The Riddlers was produced by Ian Fell and directed by Chris Ryder (later a series producer). Later series were directed by Ann Ayoub. The executive producer was Chris Jelley.

All episodes were written by Rick Vanes (whose previous work for YTV included Puddle Lane and Mooncat). Eesup's Foibles stories were written by Shirley Isherwood. Neil Innes provided the music and songs featured. Puppeteer for Middler and Mossop, Richard Robinson, created the puppets and provided illustrations for the Eesup's Foibles stories. David Baker was assistant puppeteer series 1 through 6 and Garry Rutter for the show's last three years. Garry Rutter would later work on MacDonalds Farm puppeteering Baa Baa and The Fimbles Doing animatronic work.

Many of the programmes were recorded in Yorkshire Television's studios on Kirkstall Road, Leeds, although some later episodes were filmed on location. Five VHS releases were issued by Video Collection International, two DVDs were issued by Kids Club (VCI) and several tie-in books were published.

An episode from the fifth series was broadcast on the CITV channel on 6 January 2013, as part of a weekend of archive programmes to celebrate CITV's 30th anniversary.

== Transmission guide ==
=== Series 1 (1989-1990) ===
No. in season	Title	Directed by	Written by	Original release date
1	"Moving In"	Unknown	Unknown	2 November 1989
Marjorie has just moved in to Riddleton End a small cottage in the countryside. To her delight she discovers that two Riddlers living in the garden, the magical little folk who find human ways very confusing.
2	"A Present for Marjorie"	Unknown	Unknown	9 November 1989
The Riddlers want to give Marjorie a present, but they have some odd ideas about what it should be.
3	"The Wedding Hat"	Unknown	Unknown	16 November 1989
Lampshades can look like hats and Mossop needs a hat for a wedding he's been invited to attend.
4	"The House-Warming Party"	Unknown	Unknown	23 November 1989
Thanks to Mr Grimley there's insufficient food to go round at Marjorie's house warming party.
5	"The Riddling Tree"	Unknown	Unknown	30 November 1989
Filbert the squirrel will get a new home if Tiddler can work out the answer to the secrets of the Riddling Tree.
6	"The Potted Plants"	Unknown	Unknown	7 December 1989
Mossop can't tell the difference between a pedal bin and a plant pot.
7	"Sleepy Heads"	Unknown	Unknown	14 December 1989
The Riddlers have trouble with a hammock especially as Mossop wants to sleep in it at the bottom of the well.
8	"Riddling Boots"	Unknown	Unknown	21 December 1989
A Riddler's proudest possession is his Riddling Boots and Tiddler can hardly wait for the day she gets hers. In the meantime, she borrows Mossop's but unfortunately things go wrong.
9	"Fishing"	Unknown	Unknown	11 January 1990
Mossop and Tiddler are fishing in the well but don't want to catch a fish. Marjorie is confused!
10	"The Fairy"	Unknown	Unknown	18 January 1990
One of the most magical things in the garden is the fairy but you can only see her if you believe in her.
11	"Decisions, Decisions"	Unknown	Unknown	25 January 1990
Have the Riddlers got a better way than humans when it comes to making decisions?
12	"Missing the Bus"	Unknown	Unknown	1 February 1990
Mossop and Tiddler help Marjorie because she has such a lot to do before going to the theatre and she could miss her bus.
13	"Gone Camping"	Unknown	Unknown	8 February 1990
An unusual object in the garden found when they return from holiday puzzles Tiddler but Mossop is confident he knows what it is.
14	"Mossop the Strongman"	Unknown	Unknown	15 February 1990
A strange large box has been delivered to the house. What secret does it contain?
15	"The Flittering"	Unknown	Unknown	22 February 1990
Tiddler tells a ghost story but Mr Grimley isn't afraid of anything or so he says!
16	"Bothersome Birds"	Unknown	Unknown	1 March 1990
Mossop has plans to frighten away the birds because they have been pecking holes in Marjorie's milk bottle tops.
17	"Grimley's Tuba"	Unknown	Unknown	8 March 1990
Mossop and Tiddler find Mr Grimley's tuba but can't work out what it is.
18	"In Search of the Lost Nuts"	Unknown	Unknown	15 March 1990
Mr Grimley strikes lucky in a surprising way when Filbert loses his hoard of nuts as he awakens from his winter sleep.
19	"Tiddler's Beads"	Unknown	Unknown	22 March 1990
Marjorie helps Tiddler to thread some colourful beads on to a string. But when Mossop comes along, things begin to go wrong.
20	"Postie the Prisoner"	Unknown	Unknown	29 March 1990
Mossop, Tiddler and Marjorie look everywhere for the postman, but he's nowhere to be seen.
21	"Robins Nest"	Unknown	Unknown	5 April 1990
Mr Grimley is proud of his discovery but the others have their doubts.
22	"House-Hunting"	Unknown	Unknown	12 April 1990
Mossop tries to find a new home for himself and Tiddler then has an unfortunate accident.
23	"Mossop Shows the Way"	Unknown	Unknown	19 April 1990
Things go wrong when Mossop and Tiddler wearing blindfold play follow my leader. When Marjorie suggests an alternate game, things get even worse.
24	"Peace and Quiet"	Unknown	Unknown	26 April 1990
Mossop and Tiddler find a new way of lighting the well.
25	"That's Torn It"	Unknown	Unknown	3 May 1990
Mossop's trousers are torn and Marjorie lends a hand.
26	"Tiddler's Time Magic"	Unknown	Unknown	10 May 1990
Mossop suggests that Tiddler should use a magic spell to allow Marjorie and Mr Grimley to see the Dawn Fairy.

=== Series 2 (1990-1991) ===
No. in season	Title	Directed by	Written by	Original release date
1	"Mossop Needs a Haircut"	Unknown	Unknown	15 November 1990
Tiddler sends Mossop for a haircut.
2	"Rat in the Garden"	Unknown	Unknown	22 November 1990
A cat called Simon and a rat called Bella are found in the garden by Mossop and Tiddler. But is Bella nasty or nice?
3	"Middler"	Unknown	Unknown	29 November 1990
There's a shock for Marjorie who thought that Mossop and Tiddler were the only Riddlers living in her garden.
4	"A Present from Middler"	Unknown	Unknown	6 December 1990
Middler's present to Mossop is quite surprising.
5	"Tiddler at Bedtime"	Unknown	Unknown	13 December 1990
Tiddler protests because she always has to go to bed first.
6	"The Siege of Riddleton End"	Unknown	Unknown	20 December 1990
Mossop and Tiddler prepare to defend their garden.
7	"In the Soup"	Unknown	Unknown	10 January 1991
Mossop and Mr Grimley make some soup with a difference when Marjorie tells them she isn't very well.
8	"Tiddletricks Day"	Unknown	Unknown	17 January 1991
Tiddletricks Day is the special day that the Riddlers play tricks on people, so Marjorie had better be on her guard.
9	"The Singing Tree"	Unknown	Unknown	24 January 1991
Middler is trying to convince the Riddlers that the riddling tree is a singing tree.
10	"Grooming Grimley"	Unknown	Unknown	31 January 1991
The Riddlers help to smarten up Mr Grimley for a new job.
11	"Daft as Brushes"	Unknown	Unknown	7 February 1991
12	"Mossop Builds a Car"	Unknown	Unknown	14 February 1991
Marjorie learns to ride a bike and Mossop goes for a spin.
13	"Cat on the Run"	Unknown	Unknown	21 February 1991
Tiddler is not happy when Mossop tells Marjorie a fib.
14	"Wet Paint"	Unknown	Unknown	28 February 1991
Mossop talks Tiddler into helping him to surprise Marjorie.
15	"Spring Time for Middler"	Unknown	Unknown	7 March 1991
16	"A Question of Balance"	Unknown	Unknown	14 March 1991
17	"Mossop the Artist"	Unknown	Unknown	21 March 1991
18	"Middler the Invisible"	Unknown	Unknown	28 March 1991
19	"The Mystery of the Shrinking Tiddler"	Unknown	Unknown	4 April 1991
20	"Mossop Loses His Voice"	Unknown	Unknown	11 April 1991
21	"The Flood"	Unknown	Unknown	18 April 1991
22	"Red Herring"	Unknown	Unknown	25 April 1991
23	"Stop, Look and Listen"	Unknown	Unknown	2 May 1991
Marjorie comes up with some original ways to learn how to cross the road.
24	"The Lighting Machines"	Unknown	Unknown	9 May 1991
25	"Holiday Plans"	Unknown	Unknown	16 May 1991
Mossop decides that a flying holiday would make a nice change but can Riddlers fly?
26	"Tiddler's Test"	Unknown	Unknown	23 May 1991

=== Series 3 (1991-1992) ===
No. in season	Title	Directed by	Written by	Original release date
1	"Stones from the Sky"	Unknown	Unknown	12 December 1991
2	"Lights Out"	Unknown	Unknown	19 December 1991
3	"Treasure of Riddleton End"	Unknown	Unknown	9 January 1992
4	"Mossop the Hero"	Unknown	Unknown	16 January 1992
5	"Mossop and Grimley - Builders"	Unknown	Unknown	23 January 1992
6	"Middler's Invisible Horse"	Unknown	Unknown	30 January 1992
7	"A Brush with Mossop"	Unknown	Unknown	6 February 1992
8	"The Riddlestone Necklace"	Unknown	Unknown	13 February 1992
9	"The Search for a Riddling Tree"	Unknown	Unknown	20 February 1992
10	"Top Hat and Tails"	Unknown	Unknown	27 February 1992
Mr Grimley models a frock and, as the big day approaches, the Riddlers explore the art of photography.
11	"The Honorary Riddler"	Unknown	Unknown	5 March 1992
12	"A Riddler at Last"	Unknown	Unknown	12 March 1992
13	"Mossop's Magic Cleaner"	Unknown	Unknown	19 March 1992
14	"Tiddlup Doesn't Live Here Anymore"	Unknown	Unknown	26 March 1992
15	"Mossop the Thinker"	Unknown	Unknown	2 April 1992
16	"Learning to Teach"	Unknown	Unknown	9 April 1992
17	"Counting on Mossop"	Unknown	Unknown	16 April 1992
18	"Skate Expectations"	Unknown	Unknown	23 April 1992
19	"The Speeding Detective"	Unknown	Unknown	30 April 1992
20	"The Magnificent Handcart"	Unknown	Unknown	7 May 1992
21	"Spider, Spider"	Unknown	Unknown	14 May 1992
22	"Heavy Reading"	Unknown	Unknown	21 May 1992
23	"Cold Comfort Cottage"	Unknown	Unknown	28 May 1992
24	"That's Hen-tertainment"	Unknown	Unknown	4 June 1992

=== Series 4 (1992-1993) ===
1. Water Music - 26 November 1992
2. Belt and Braces - 3 December 1992
3. Worrying Developments - 10 December 1992
4. Edgar Saves the Day - 17 December 1992
5. Water, Water Anywhere? - 7 January 1993
6. Not Wanted on Voyage - 14 January 1993
7. Camp Sights - 21 January 1993
8. Beside the Seaside - 28 January 1993
9. Tickets to Ride - 4 February 1993
10. A Head for Heights - 11 February 1993
11. Fish & Ships - 18 February 1993
12. A Room for the Knight - 25 February 1993
13. A Ticklish Problem - 4 March 1993
14. Getting in Shape - 11 March 1993
15. Return to Lender - 18 March 1993
16. The Riddler Christmas - 25 March 1993
17. Mossop on His Metal - 1 April 1993
18. Mossop the Genius - 8 April 1993
19. Too Big for His Boots - 15 April 1993
20. A Few Hiccups - 22 April 1993
21. The New Mossy Boots - 29 April 1993
22. Special Delivery - 6 May 1993
23. Doing Things Day - 13 May 1993

=== Series 5 (1993-1994) ===
1. Relatively Speaking – 7 September 1993
2. Squeamish - 9 September 1993
3. A Miner Problem - 14 September 1993
4. The Tooth Will Out – 16 September 1993
5. Back to School - 21 September 1993
6. Legend of the Vampire Hedgehog - 23 September 1993
7. Lucks and Ducks – 28 September 1993
8. A Whale of a Time – 30 September 1993
9. A Shady Character - 5 October 1993
10. A Complete Washout - 7 October 1993
11. The Wrong Lines - 12 October 1993
12. Not So Smart - 14 October 1993
13. A Hat for Middler - 19 October 1993
14. All the Fun of the Festival - 21 October 1993
15. Middler the Plotter - 26 October 1993
16. Daring in the Diary - 28 October 1993
17. Feeding Time - 2 November 1993
18. The Stowaway - 4 November 1993
19. The Isle of Riddlers - 9 November 1993
20. The Rocket - 11 November 1993
21. The Missing Tickets - 16 November 1993
22. Vikings and Black Dogs - 18 November 1993
23. Three Legs, Four Horns, Seven Kingdoms - 23 November 1993
24. Fairies and Tales - 25 November 1993
25. Who's Been Sleeping in My Cellar - 2 December 1993
26. Oh Brother - 7 December 1993
27. A Job at the Circus - 9 December 1993
28. Roll Up, Fall Down - 14 December 1993
29. Glossop Moves In - 16 December 1993
30. The Unwelcome Guest - 4 January 1994

=== Series 6 (1994-1995) ===
1. All Fall Down - 8 September 1994
2. Home and Wahey! - 15 September 1994
3. In Branches Everywhere - 22 September 1994
4. Trouble in Store - 29 September 1994
5. The Super Well - 6 October 1994
6. A Caravan for Middler - 13 October 1994
7. Flight to Holy Island - 20 October 1994
8. On Hadrian's Wall - 27 October 1994
9. Dipping and Tripping - 3 November 1994
10. Tiddlup at the Wicket - 10 November 1994
11. A Face from the Past - 17 November 1994
12. Job Hunting - 24 November 1994
13. Last with the News - 1 December 1994
14. The Riddleton Circus - 8 December 1994
15. Punch and Judy - 15 December 1994
16. Oh, Baby! - 12 January 1995
17. Hush a Bye Mossop - 19 January 1995
18. Mossop Steps Out - 26 January 1995
19. A Tiddler at Play School - 2 February 1995
20. Mossop Returns - 9 February 1995

=== Series 7 (1995-1996) ===
1. Hair Today, Gone Tomorrow - 7 September 1995
2. Just for Kicks - 14 September 1995
3. A Test for Middler - 21 September 1995
4. Trick Cycling - 28 September 1995
5. Where on Earth? - 5 October 1995
6. French Lessons - 12 October 1995
7. Bon Appetit - 19 October 1995
8. Alarms and Excursions - 26 October 1995
9. Eesup - 2 November 1995
10. Let Loose in the Library - 9 November 1995
11. A Tiddler's Best Friend - 16 November 1995
12. It's a Dog's Life - 23 November 1995
13. Dog Tired - 30 November 1995
14. The Phantom Piper - 7 December 1995
15. Loch Ness Mess - 14 December 1995
16. Cabers and Kilts - 4 January 1996
17. Highland Fun and Games - 11 January 1996
18. A Little Bit of Dirt - 18 January 1996
19. At the Hospital - 25 January 1996
20. Mossop the Invalid - 1 February 1996
21. Thanks a Lot - 8 February 1996
22. Flea Market - 15 February 1996
23. Mossop the Conkeror - 22 February 1996
24. Grimley the Golfer - 29 February 1996
25. Listen to the Band - 7 March 1996

=== Series 8 (1996-1997) ===
1. Vote for Mossop - 12 September 1996
2. The Chief Riddler - 19 September 1996
3. Statue There? - 26 September 1996
4. Your Place or Mine - 3 October 1996
5. Well Dressed Wells - 10 October 1996
6. Light Fantastic - 17 October 1996
7. Middler's Mansion - 24 October 1996
8. The Tiddlers' Holiday Camp - 31 October 1996
9. Tickling Trout - 7 November 1996
10. Daylight Snobbery - 14 November 1996
11. Rootin' Tootin' Cowboys - 21 November 1996
12. Under the Greenwood Tree - 28 November 1996
13. A-Hunting We Will Go - 5 December 1996
14. Eesup Junior - 12 December 1996
15. Not a Leg to Stand On - 19 December 1996
16. Chairs and Stairs - 9 January 1997
17. Mossop Calling - 16 January 1997
18. Middler's Taxi Service - 23 January 1997
19. Lollipop Middler - 30 January 1997
20. Clothes for Your Nose - 6 February 1997
21. Highly Alarming - 13 February 1997
22. A Word in the Hand... - 20 February 1997
23. Leisure Hunt - 27 February 1997
24. Stereo-oh! - 6 March 1997
25. Playing Chopsticks - 13 March 1997

=== Series 9 (1997-1998) ===
1. Ideal Home - 9 September 1997
2. Dumb Waiter - 16 September 1997
3. That Sinking Feeling - 23 September 1997
4. All Stuck Up - 30 September 1997
5. All at Sea - 7 October 1997
6. Castaways - 14 October 1997
7. On the Line - 21 October 1997
8. Cycling Proficiency - 28 October 1997
9. Middler's Cafe - 4 November 1997
10. Metal Detector - 11 November 1997
11. The Time Machine - 18 November 1997
12. Mystery in History - 25 November 1997
13. Back to the Stone Age - 2 December 1997
14. Blow Up - 16 December 1997
15. Spooks of Riddleton End - 18 June 1998
16. Mossop's Art Gallery - 25 June 1998
17. Good Sports - 2 July 1998
18. Hoe, Hoe, Hoe - 9 July 1998
19. Riddler Scouts - 16 July 1998
20. Tall and Small and Basketball - 23 July 1998
21. Creepy Crawlies - 30 July 1998
22. Fashion Victims - 6 August 1998
23. Little Red Riding Hood - 13 August 1998
24. That's Rich - 20 August 1998
25. Good Morning, Mr. Magpie - 27 August 1998

== UK VHS releases ==
VHS title	Release date	Episodes
The Riddlers: Mossop Needs A Haircut And Other Stories (YTVE 17)	1991	Mossop Needs A Haircut, Siege of Riddlers End, Daft As A Brush, Holiday Plans
The Riddlers: Mossop The Hero And Other Stories (VC1264)	5 October 1992	Stones From the Sky, Lights Out, The Treasure of Riddleton End, Mossop the Hero
The Riddlers: The Riddlestone Necklace And Other Stories (VC1278)	8 February 1993	Mossop and Grimley Builders, Middler's Invisible Horse, A Brush with Mossop, The Riddlestone Necklace
The Riddlers: A Riddler at Last and Other Stories (VC1309)	5 July 1993	The Search For a Riddling Tree, Top Hat and Tails, The Honorary Riddler, A Riddler at Last
The Riddlers: Mossop The Thinker and Other Stories (KC1513)	9 March 1998	Mossop's Magic Cleaner, Tiddlup Doesn't Live Here Anymore, Mossop The Thinker, Learning To Teach
