= Nigel Harris (actor) =

British actor (born 1949)

Nigel Harris (born 1949) is a British actor.

Harris was born in Grahamstown, South Africa. He is the son of the philosopher, Errol Harris, and grandson of Samuel Harris, who with Cecil Rhodes was one of the defenders of Kimberly when the town was besieged during the Boer War. He obtained a B.A. in philosophy at the University of Nottingham in 1971, where he was the External Affairs Chairman of the Students’ Union. He trained as a drama teacher at Alsager College of Education (where he acted with and became close friends with Joe Leeway, who later became one of the Thompson Twins) in 1973 and as an actor at the Birmingham Theatre School (where he was a contemporary of Toyah Willcox) in 1976.

In film, he has worked with directors Federico Fellini (playing Guianin Micheluzzi in The Voice of the Moon), Anton Corbijn, and Asif Kapadia. His theatre credits include working with the English fringe theatre company Foco Novo (which was set up by director Roland Rees and playwright Bernard Pomerance so as to produce Pomerance's plays Foco Novo and The Elephant Man). For Foco Novo, Harris created the role of The Journeyman (a conflation of the fairground barker, the knife-supplying Jew, and various other characters) in Peter Hulton's translation of Woyzeck. In the 1970s and 1980s, he worked at the Birmingham Repertory Theatre, creating the role of Abb in David Rudkin’s The Triumph of Death. His performance in an episode of The Bill was shown on the 1990 BAFTA Awards program.

He lives in Nottingham, England, and from 2005 to 2007, was the chairman of the Midlands Area Committee of Equity, the British live arts trade union. In 2011, Harris starred in the one off BBC Christmas show, Lapland.

Harris has a Bachelor of Arts in Philosophy and is the editor of 'Bound in Shallows, Autobiographical Reminiscences, Memoirs of a Philosopher.'

He has also been a successful theatrical agent, when he was a member of the co-operative actors agency The Central Line.
