= Peter Llewellyn-Jones =

English sign language interpreter and actor (1950–2026)

Peter Llewellyn-Jones (26 February 1950 – 18 August 2026) was an English sign language interpreter and actor. He played Mr. Grimley in the 1990s children's television series The Riddlers. Llewellyn-Jones died on 18 August 2026, aged 76.
