= Little Crackers =

- Genre: Drama
- Country of origin: United Kingdom
- Original language: English
- No. of series: 3
- No. of episodes: 35

Production
- Executive producers: Lucy Lumsden; Saskia Schuster
- Running time: 15mins (Series 1-2); 30mins (inc. adverts) (Series 3-)
- Production companies: Blue Door Adventures; Phil McIntyre Television; Sprout Pictures; Tiger Aspect Productions; Silver River Productions; Renegade Pictures; Glassbox Productions; Avalon Television; Can Communicate

Original release
- Network: Sky1
- Release: 19 December 2010 – 20 December 2012

Related
- 10 Minute Tales

Little Crackers is a British Christmas comedy-drama that was broadcast on Sky1. It consists of a series of short films featuring British and Irish comedians and actors, including people like Stephen Fry, Catherine Tate, Chris O'Dowd, Kathy Burke, Victoria Wood, and Bill Bailey. According to Sky Television, the show marked the start of their biggest investment in British comedy during Sky1's twenty-year history. The success of the first series led Sky to renew the show for a second series, which began airing on 18 December 2011. The comedians involved in the second series included Harry Hill, Sheridan Smith, Sanjeev Bhaskar, John Bishop, Shappi Khorsandi and Jack Whitehall.

Moone Boy, created by and starring Chris O'Dowd for Sky1, and Walking and Talking, written by and starring Kathy Burke for Sky Atlantic, are both full series based on Little Crackers shorts. They have been commissioned for 6 episodes and 4 episodes respectively.

== Summary ==
In the films, the stars – with the help of rising young actors such as Madeleine Power as the young Catherine Tate – recreate stories from their childhood. The films, which last between 10 and 12 minutes each, include Catherine Tate reenacting an occasion when she decided to mimic the controversial singer Gary Glitter in a school nativity; Stephen Fry as a head teacher doling out corporal punishment to his younger self played by Daniel Roche; and Dawn French as the Queen Mother, whom she met at the age of four. David Baddiel, Julian Barratt, Bill Bailey, Jo Brand, Victoria Wood, Chris O'Dowd and Julia Davis are among the other actors who recreate childhood incidents and memories.

Catherine Tate's Little Cracker, My First Nativity, was nominated for Best Comedy Programme, at the British Academy Television Awards 2011. It was beaten by BBC Two's Harry and Paul.

== Production ==
The series was commissioned by Sky1 after the success of the short film series 10 Minute Tales in 2009. That series featured 12 silent short films of around 8 minutes in length and starred popular British actors (including Bill Nighy) and was directed by Ian Rickson.

Two of the episodes were produced by Silver River. The titles of the two episodes were revealed as "First Kiss" and "Satan's Hoof", starring Julia Davis and Julian Barratt respectively. A further three episodes were produced by Tiger Aspect: "Better Than Christmas", "The Queen Mother's Visit" (alternatively known as "Operation Big Hat") and "My First Nativity".

The first series of Little Crackers saw Catherine Tate, Julia Davis and Bill Bailey, marking their directorial debuts.

== Broadcast ==
The show began airing on Sky1 and in high definition on Sky1 HD on 19 December 2010. Two episodes were broadcast each evening until 23 December, while the final two episodes were broadcast on Christmas Eve and Christmas Day. The Meera Syal short was the UK's first ever scripted TV comedy broadcast in 3D.

A second series of 11 episodes was broadcast on Sky1 from 18 to 23 December 2011. A special behind-the-scenes look at the show was also broadcast and made available on Sky Anytime.

== Episodes ==
| Series | Episodes | Originally released | |
| Series | Episodes | First released | Last released |
|---|---|---|---|
| 1 | 12 | 19 December 2010 | 25 December 2010 |
| 2 | 11 | 18 December 2011 | 23 December 2011 |
| 3 | 12 | 10 December 2012 | 20 December 2012 |

=== Series 1 (2010) ===
| No. overall | No. in series | Title | Directed by | Written by | Original release date |
|---|---|---|---|---|---|
| 1 | 1 | "Victoria Wood's Little Cracker: The Giddy Kipper" | Victoria Wood | Victoria Wood | 19 December 2010 |
For eight-year-old Eunice, this Christmas is going to be different. This year it's just her and her dad, and there's little festive spirit to be found in an autobiographical short written, directed by and starring Victoria Wood.
| 2 | 2 | "Chris O'Dowd's Little Cracker: Capturing Santa" | Peter Cattaneo | Chris O'Dowd and Nick Murphy | 19 December 2010 |
Not everyone has a soft spot for Santa in an autobiographical short co-written by and starring Chris O'Dowd.
| 3 | 3 | "Catherine Tate's Little Cracker: My First Nativity" | Catherine Tate | Catherine Tate | 20 December 2010 |
A novel twist on the Nativity in an autobiographical short written, directed by and starring Catherine Tate.
| 4 | 4 | "Julian Barratt's Little Cracker: Satan's Hoof" | Julian Barratt | Julian Barratt | 20 December 2010 |
Get to know Satan, yes Satan, in an autobiographical short written, directed by and starring Julian Barratt.
| 5 | 5 | "Stephen Fry's Little Cracker: Bunce" | Peter Cattaneo | Stephen Fry | 21 December 2010 |
Someone's sweet tooth lands him in trouble in an autobiographical short written by and starring Stephen Fry.
| 6 | 6 | "Kathy Burke's Little Cracker: Better Than Christmas" | Tim Kirkby | Kathy Burke | 21 December 2010 |
The Clash gives a certain fan life-changing advice in an autobiographical short written by and starring Kathy Burke.
| 7 | 7 | "Jo Brand's Little Cracker: Goodbye Fluff" | Mike Christie | Jo Brand | 22 December 2010 |
It's all about teenage turmoil and a moggy mystery in an autobiographical short written by and starring Jo Brand.
| 8 | 8 | "Bill Bailey's Little Cracker: Car Park Babylon" | Bill Bailey and Joe Magee | Bill Bailey and Joe Magee | 22 December 2010 |
Christmas is about giving not gadgetry in an autobiographical short co-written, co-directed by and starring Bill Bailey.
| 9 | 9 | "David Baddiel's Little Cracker: The Norris McWhirter Chronicles - A True Story" | David Baddiel | David Baddiel | 23 December 2010 |
Even those normally right can be wrong in an autobiographical short written, directed by and starring David Baddiel.
| 10 | 10 | "Julia Davis's Little Cracker: The Kiss" | Julia Davis | Julia Davis | 23 December 2010 |
A shy teen prepares for her first kiss in an autobiographical short written, directed by and starring Julia Davis.
| 11 | 11 | "Dawn French's Little Cracker: Operation Big Hat" | Dewi Humphreys | Beth Kilcoyne and Emma Kilcoyne | 24 December 2010 |
Make way for the Queen Mother who comes to visit in an autobiographical short based on the life of Dawn French.
| 12 | 12 | "Meera Syal's Little Cracker: Uncle Santa" | Peter Lydon | Meera Syal | 25 December 2010 |
Uncle Satnam steps out from Santa's shadow in an autobiographical short written by and starring Meera Syal. Filmed in 3D.

=== Series 2 (2011) ===
| No. overall | No. in series | Title | Directed by | Written by | Original release date |
|---|---|---|---|---|---|
| 13 | 1 | "Barbara Windsor's Little Cracker: My First Brassiere" | Paul King | Matt Evans | 18 December 2011 |
A budding young actress receives a boost in a short inspired by the life and times of Barbara Windsor.
| 14 | 2 | "Jack Whitehall's Little Cracker: Daddy's Little Princess" | Juliet May | Jack Whitehall | 18 December 2011 |
The Prince of Thieves offers a few pearls of wisdom in a short written by and starring Jack Whitehall.
| 15 | 3 | "Jane Horrocks' Little Cracker: Barbra" | Paul Norton Walker | Nick Vivian | 19 December 2011 |
Bad hair and a unique talent are unveiled in a short inspired by the life and times of Jane Horrocks.
| 16 | 4 | "Harry Hill's Little Cracker: Your Face" | Harry Hill | Harry Hill | 19 December 2011 |
It's all about that father-(puppet)son bond in a short written, directed by and starring Harry Hill.
| 17 | 5 | "Alan Davies' Little Cracker: The Curious Incident of the Dog in the Daytime" | Oliver Lansley | Alan Davies and Oliver Lansley | 20 December 2011 |
The adage about a man and his dog is put to the test in a short co-written by and starring Alan Davies.
| 18 | 6 | "Shappi Khorsandi's Little Cracker: Shappi 4 Todd" | Chris Cotton | Shappi Khorsandi | 20 December 2011 |
Someone's fondness for Tucker Jenkins goes too far in a short written by and starring Shappi Khorsandi.
| 19 | 7 | "John Bishop's Little Cracker: My First Ton" | John Bishop | John Bishop | 21 December 2011 |
A Christmas job takes an unexpected direction in a short written, directed by and starring John Bishop.
| 20 | 8 | "Sheridan Smith's Little Cracker: The Daltons" | Paul King | Michael Wynne | 21 December 2011 |
One little girl is destined for stardom in a short inspired by the life and times of Sheridan Smith.
| 21 | 9 | "Sally Lindsay's Little Cracker: My First Christmas Number One" | Dewi Humphreys | Sarah Hooper | 22 December 2011 |
There's no one quite like Grandma in a short inspired by the life and times of Sally Lindsay.
| 22 | 10 | "Sanjeev Bhaskar's Little Cracker: Papaji Saves Christmas" | Sanjeev Bhaskar | Sanjeev Bhaskar | 22 December 2011 |
It really is a Christmas to remember in a short written, directed by and starring Sanjeev Bhaskar.
| 23 | 11 | "Johnny Vegas' Little Cracker: I Was A Teenage Santa!" | Johnny Vegas | Johnny Vegas | 23 December 2011 |
Santa's suit needs last-minute filling in a short written, directed by and starring Johnny Vegas.

=== Series 3 (2012) ===
| No. overall | No. in series | Title | Directed by | Written by | Original release date |
|---|---|---|---|---|---|
| 24 | 1 | "Joanna Lumley's Little Cracker: Baby, Be Blonde" | Joanna Lumley | Tessa Gibbs | 10 December 2012 |
Nineteen-year-old Joanna Lumley is still finding her feet in the competitive world of modelling in a short directed by and starring Joanna Lumley.
| 25 | 2 | "Rebecca Front's Little Cracker: Rainy Days & Mondays" | Christine Gernon | Rebecca & Jeremy Front | 11 December 2012 |
Little Rebecca Front doesn't ever want to go back to school in a short co-written by and starring Rebecca Front.
| 26 | 3 | "Tommy Tiernan's Little Cracker: Howler" | Tommy Tiernan | Tommy Tiernan | 12 December 2012 |
Little Tommy Tiernan's parents are going through a rough patch and, after speaking to a therapist, his dad has been advised to unleash his inner canine and bark his stresses out in a short written, directed by and starring Tommy Tiernan.
| 27 | 4 | "Caroline Quentin's Little Cracker: Nutcracker" | Caroline Quentin | Caroline Quentin | 13 December 2012 |
Young Kitty has the starring role in her ballet school's Christmas production of The Nutcracker and she wants more than anything for her mum to be in the audience in a short written, directed by and starring Caroline Quentin.
| 28 | 5 | "Alison Steadman's Little Cracker: The Autograph" | Peter Cattaneo | Alison Steadman | 17 December 2012 |
Sixteen-year-old Alison and her pals are understandably excited about an upcoming lunchtime gig at The Cavern Club in a short written by and starring Alison Steadman.
| 29 | 6 | "Dylan Moran's Little Cracker: The Awkward Age" | Ian Fitzgibbon | Dylan Moran | 17 December 2012 |
Dylan Moran's Son returns home from his first interview with bad news... he's been beaten up and had his mobile phone stolen in a short written by and starring Dylan Moran.
| 30 | 7 | "Jason Manford's Little Cracker: A Tender Christmas" | Mustapha Kseibati | Jason Manford | 18 December 2012 |
Young Jason Manford is scared. At the age of 12, he's embarking on his first trip away from home... he's going to hospital in a short written by and starring Jason Manford.
| 31 | 8 | "Omid Djalili's Little Cracker: The Ten Year Plan - Fringe To Hollywood" | Omid Djalili | Omid Djalili | 18 December 2012 |
Omid Djalili is a 22-year-old with a plan. A one-man show will kick-start his journey to Hollywood in a short written, directed by and starring Omid Djalili.
| 32 | 9 | "Paul O'Grady's Little Cracker: Boo! A Ghost Story" | Peter Cattaneo | Paul O'Grady | 19 December 2012 |
Controversial horror film The Exorcist has just been released and its terrifying cinema goers up and down the country in a short written by and starring Paul O’Grady.
| 33 | 10 | "Katy Brand's Little Cracker: Of All The Trees" | Edward Dick | Katy Brand | 19 December 2012 |
When 10-year-old Katy Brand makes an earth-shattering discovery on Christmas Eve, the magic and sparkle of the festive season vanishes in a short written by and starring Katy Brand.
| 34 | 11 | "Sharon Horgan's Little Cracker: The Week Before Christmas" | Sharon Horgan | Sharon Horgan | 20 December 2012 |
Christmas on the Horgans' turkey farm is a hectic time and 14-year-old Sharon must do her share of the plucking in a short written, directed by and starring Sharon Horgan.
| 35 | 12 | "Darren Boyd's Little Cracker: Le Concert de L'école" | Darren Boyd | Darren Boyd | 20 December 2012 |
Darren Boyd has been given a great honour, singing at his school's local Christmas concert, and he can't wait to share the news with his mum and dad in a short written, directed by and starring Darren Boyd.
