= Sharon Byatt =

British actress

Sharon Byatt (born in Liverpool) is a British actress who has appeared on TV as Irenee in Carla Lane's Bread and Sue Freeman in Springhill, and on stage as both Linda and Mrs. Johnstone in Blood Brothers.

== Biography ==
Byatt attended St Julie's Catholic High School in Liverpool, and trained at the Chiltern School of Dance and Drama in West Derby, Liverpool. Her first stage appearance was in 1990 in the musical Blood Brothers in London's West End, playing "a sparky, tomboyish Linda". She reprised the role in regional tours of the show, and has also played the role of Mrs Johnstone in performances of Blood Brothers in York and Malvern. She has also appeared in leading roles in The Tommy Cooper Show in Blackpool and Sheffield, and A Midsummer Night's Dream and A Taste of Honey in Liverpool.
She is artistic director of the Chiltern Youth Theatre Company.

=== Selected stage performances ===
Year	Title	Theatre	Role	Director
1990	Blood Brothers	Albery Theatre, London	Linda	
1992	Grand Hotel	Dominion Theatre, London		Tommy Tune
1995	Blood Brothers	Birmingham Hippodrome	Linda	Bill Kenwright
2005	Blood Brothers	York	Mrs Johnstone	
2006	Blood Brothers	Festival Theatre, Malvern	Mrs Johnstone	
2014	The Tommy Cooper Show	Lantern Theatre, Sheffield	Gwen Cooper	
2015	The Tommy Cooper Show	Blackpool Grand Theatre	Gwen Cooper	
2018	A Midsummer Night's Dream	Epstein Theatre, Liverpool	Titania	Daniel Taylor
2018	A Taste of Honey	Epstein Theatre, Liverpool	Helen	Daniel Taylor
2019	Knee Deep In Promises	Royal Court Studio, Liverpool	Trish	Paul Goetzee

=== Selected filmography ===
Year	Title	Role	Notes
1990	Brookside	Coral, secretary of Johnathan Gordon-Davies	uncredited
1990-1991	Bread	Irenee	8 episodes + Christmas special
1997	Springhill	Sue Freeman / Johnson	25 episodes
