= The Birmingham Theatre School =

Drama school in Birmingham, England

Coordinates: 52.4766°N 1.8989°W

The Birmingham Theatre School is a drama school, located in Birmingham, England.

The school was founded by Sir Barry Jackson in the theatre that he built, namely the Old Rep Theatre, which was also the first repertory theatre in the world. The school now has over 250 students on a variety of full and part-time. In 1942, Sir Barry Jackson appointed Mary Richards, with whom he had previously worked as an actress, to take over as principal of the drama school. In 1990, Chris Rozanski was appointed principal.

The school has since relocated to The Old Fire Station in Highgate, Birmingham and is no longer based at the Old Rep Theatre.

As well as putting on shows as part of the schools courses the venue, costumes, props and staging is available for hire.

In 2023 the BTS Promenade Theatre Company was formed to provide a commercial platform for graduates of the Theatre School. The most recent production was 'One Flew Over the Cuckoos Nest' in July 2023.

== Previous productions ==
Year	Show	Photos	Video
2003	Nicholas Nickleby		
2004	A Tale of Two Cities		
2005	The Grapes of Wrath		
2006	Daughters of Venice		
2007	Heartlanders		
2008	Coram Boy		
2009	War & Peace		
2010	Playing for Time		
2011	David Copperfield		
2012	Two		
2012	Dracula		
2013	Frankenstein		
2013	Macbeth		
2013	Terrorism		
2013	The Accrington Pals		
2014	A Tale of Two Cities		
2015	Our Country's Good		
2016	Dracula		
2016	Cabaret		
2017	The Three Musketeers		
2018	The Crucible		
2019	Around the World in 80 Days		
2021	A Midsummer Night's Dream		
2021	Titus Andronicus		
2021	The Trial		
2022	Eyam		
2022	King Lear		
2023	Woyzeck		
2023	Macbeth		

== Acceptance ==
Admission into the school is based on an audition and selection process. Successful applicants are notified in writing if they have been accepted into the school.

== Alumni ==
- Pal Aron
- Nigel Harris
- Phil Rose
