= Adrian Michaels =

British journalist

Adrian Michaels (born 8 September 1969) is a British national and international newspaper journalist. In 2014 he founded the content marketing agency FirstWord Media Ltd.

== Education ==
Michaels attended University College School, Hampstead, London (1977–1987), and Trinity College, Oxford (1987–1990) where he studied Philosophy, Politics and Economics.

== Life and career ==
In 1993, he started a 15-year career at the Financial Times including nine years as a foreign correspondent in New York and Milan. While in New York, he (with colleague Peter Spiegel) won the "Business and Finance Reporter of the Year" in the British Press Awards for 2002. This was for his work on the downfall of accountancy firm Arthur Andersen and its role in the Enron scandal. He was also runner-up in the same year as Business Journalist of the Year at the London Press Club Awards.

Michaels occasionally provoked heated debate in Italy's media while in Milan for the Financial Times. In particular, a front cover FT magazine story he wrote in 2007 on the enduring and archaic use of the female form in Italian media and advertising, and linking that to a lack of female attainment in business and politics, created a media storm and was cited in calls for equality legislation in the Italian parliament.

After the Financial Times, Michaels became Group Foreign Editor at the Telegraph Media Group in 2008, and then, in 2011, Editorial Director, Commercial, a role on the advertising side of the Telegraph that sought to capitalize on the growth in demand from advertisers to reach their audiences via more detailed content and expert journalism.

Michaels left the Telegraph in 2014 and founded FirstWord, an agency that continues his work in content for non-media organisations. He has been a defender of the growing alignment of company marketing and journalism against criticism that it is endangering the independence of journalists.

== Personal life ==
Michaels' entry in Who's Who says he is married with two daughters. Adrian lists his hobbies as "golf, cheese”.
