= Richard Robinson (festival director) =

- Born: 1953 (age 71–72); Halifax, West Riding of Yorkshire, England, United Kingdom
- Occupations: Actor; writer; puppeteer; festival director; voice artist

Richard Robinson (born 1953 in Halifax, West Riding of Yorkshire, England) is an actor, writer and puppeteer. He is also the Director of the Brighton Science Festival.

== Puppetry ==
As a puppeteer, Robinson is best known for building and voicing puppets for the television series Spitting Image, The Riddlers, Dizzy Heights, and Puddle Lane. In The Riddlers, he built the puppets Mossop, Middler, Glossop, Eesup, and Tiddler (Tiddlup), also voicing Mossop and Middler. On Dizzy Heights he played Victor Gristle, and on Puddle Lane he played Toby the Dragon and other puppets. He also played Bungle in the 1994-1995 revival of the children's series Rainbow.

Before his puppeteering career, Richard was a busker. In the mid-1990s, after years taking his children to the Science Museum and related educational events he found a new outlet as a science busker, visiting schools and festivals with science cabaret acts.

== Author ==
He has written nearly twenty books on science. The SCIENCE MAGIC books (OUP) were shortlisted for the Royal Society's science book prize 2000. WHY THE TOAST ALWAYS LANDS BUTTER-SIDE DOWN (Constable Robinson 2005) has been translated into 14 languages.

== Brighton Science Festival ==
In 2005 he founded the Brighton Science Festival, now one of the biggest in the UK.
