= Brighton Science Festival =

Annual science festival in Brighton, United Kingdom

- Locations: Brighton, Brighton and Hove, England
- Years active: 2005–present
- Website: https://brightonscience.com/

Brighton Science Festival is a yearly science festival held in Brighton, on the UK's South Coast since 2005. The festival is the brainchild of director Richard Robinson.

Traditionally the festival has been held in February, but since 2017 the festival has been split across the year, with one set of events held in February and another set in September.
