= Crosby G&S =

Crosby Gilbert and Sullivan Society was formed in 1951 in Crosby, Liverpool.

== The Committee ==
=== Committee ===
The 2016/2017 committee:

Position	Committee Member
President	Mr James Whittle
Chairperson	Mr Rick Walker
Vice-Chairperson	Mrs Margaret Carden
Hon. Secretary	Mrs Pam Tattersall
Hon. Treasurer	Mrs Rosalie Moore
General Committee	Mrs Julie Gill, Mrs Chris Shahin, Mr Jonathan Taylor, Mrs Elaine Williams & Miss Emma Williams

=== Original Committee ===
The 1951/1952 Foundation committee:

Position	Committee Member
President	Mayor J.S Duckels
Chairperson	Mr James C. Hepburn
Vice-Chairperson	Mrs May Collins
Hon. Secretary	Miss Mollie Stananought
Hon. Treasurer	Mr Hubert B. Collingwood
General Committee	Mr Bernard Callaghan, Mrs Lilian Collingwood, Mr Andrew E. Collins, Mr Hal Forest, Mrs Anne Heald, Mr Douglas Thomas & Mr Wilfred Murray

== Productions ==
NB: Due to casting issues, the production scheduled for 1965 was postponed, therefore no production took place in 1965, but the 1966 show took place in January.

YEAR	SHOW	PRODUCER	MUSICAL DIRECTOR
2018	Ruddigore	Marilyn Seager	Brian Smith
2017	The Pirates of Penzance	Mark Duffy	Chris Larkin
2016	The Gondoliers	Barry Prescott	Chris Larkin
2015	The Mikado	Marilyn Taylor	Chris Larkin
2014	The Yeomen of the Guard	Marilyn Taylor	Brian Smith
2013	The Sorcerer	Marilyn Taylor	Malcolm Fallows
2012	The Pirates of Penzance	Marilyn Taylor	Malcolm Fallows
2011	H.M.S Pinafore & Trial by Jury	Marilyn Taylor	Brian Smith
2010	The Gondoliers	Marilyn Taylor	Brian Smith
2009	Iolanthe	Marilyn Taylor	Brian Smith
2008	The Mikado	Marilyn Taylor	Brian Smith
2007	Ruddigore	Marilyn Taylor	Brian Smith
2006	The Yeomen of the Guard	John Hilton	Brian Smith
2005	The Pirates of Penzance	John Hilton	Brian Smith
2004	Patience	John Hilton	Brian Smith
2003	The Sorcerer	Beti Lloyd-Jones	Brian Smith
2002	The Gondoliers	Beti Lloyd-Jones	Brian Smith
2001	The Mikado	Beti Lloyd-Jones	Brian Smith
2000	H.M.S Pinafore & Trial by Jury	Beti Lloyd-Jones	Brian Smith
1999	Iolanthe	Beti Lloyd-Jones	Brian Smith
1998	Ruddigore	Beti Lloyd-Jones	Brian Smith
1997	The Yeomen of the Guard	Beti Lloyd-Jones	Raymond G. Dobbs
1996	The Pirates of Penzance	Suzanne O'Keefe	Raymond G. Dobbs
1995	The Mikado	Beti Lloyd-Jones	Raymond G. Dobbs
1994	The Sorcerer	Beti Lloyd-Jones	Raymond G. Dobbs
1993	The Gondoliers	Beti Lloyd-Jones	Raymond G. Dobbs
1992	Princess Ida	Beti Lloyd-Jones	Raymond G. Dobbs
1991	H.M.S Pinafore & Trial by Jury	Beti Lloyd-Jones	Raymond G. Dobbs
1990	Iolanthe	Beti Lloyd-Jones	Raymond G. Dobbs
1989	Patience	Beti Lloyd-Jones	R. Geoffrey Cowie
1988	The Yeomen of the Guard	Beti Lloyd-Jones	R. Geoffrey Cowie
1987	Ruddigore	Beti Lloyd-Jones	R. Geoffrey Cowie
1986	Utopia Limited	Beti Lloyd-Jones	R. Geoffrey Cowie
1985	The Pirates of Penzance	Beti Lloyd-Jones	R. Geoffrey Cowie
1984	The Mikado	Beti Lloyd-Jones	R. Geoffrey Cowie
1983	The Sorcerer	Beti Lloyd-Jones	R. Geoffrey Cowie
1982	H.M.S Pianfore & Trial by Jury	May Collins	R. Geoffrey Cowie
1981	Princess Ida	May Collins	R. Geoffrey Cowie
1980	Iolanthe	May Collins	R. Geoffrey Cowie
1979	Patience	May Collins	R. Geoffrey Cowie
1978	The Gondoliers	May Collins	R. Geoffrey Cowie
1977	Ruddigore	May Collins	R. Geoffrey Cowie
1976	The Yeomen of the Guard	May Collins	R. Geoffrey Cowie
1975	The Pirates of Penzance	May Collins	R. Geoffrey Cowie
1974	The Mikado	May Collins	R. Geoffrey Cowie
1973	Utopia Limited	May Collins	R. Geoffrey Cowie
1972	Iolanthe	May Collins	R. Geoffrey Cowie
1971	The Sorcerer & Trial by Jury	May Collins	R. Geoffrey Cowie
1970	Princess Ida	May Collins	R. Geoffrey Cowie
1969	The Gondoliers	May Collins	R. Geoffrey Cowie
1968	Ruddigore	May Collins	R. Geoffrey Cowie
1967	The Yeomen of the Guard	May Collins	R. Geoffrey Cowie
1966	The Mikado	May Collins	R. Geoffrey Cowie
1964	Patience	May Collins	R. Geoffrey Cowie
1963	Pirates of Penzance, HMS Pinafore & Cox and Box	May Collins	R. Geoffrey Cowie
1962	The Sorcerer & Trial by Jury	May Collins	Donald H. Gilroy
1961	Iolanthe	May Collins	Donald H. Gilroy
1960	The Gondoliers	May Collins	Joseph Pass
1959	Princess Ida	May Collins	Joseph Pass
1958	H.M.S Pinafore	May Collins	Joseph Pass
1957	The Mikado	May Collins	Joseph Pass
1956	Ruddigore	May Collins	Joseph Pass
1955	The Yeomen of the Guard	May Collins	Wilfred Murray
1954	Iolanthe	May Collins	Wilfred Murray
1953	The Pirates of Penzance & Trial by Jury	May Collins	Wilfred Murray
1952	The Gondoliers	May Collins	Wilfred Murray
1951	The Mikado	May Collins	Frederick Slade
