= Epstein Theatre =

Theatre in Liverpool, England

- Interactive map of Epstein Theatre
- Former names: Crane's Music Hall (1913-1938); Crane's Theatre (1938-1967); Neptune Theatre (1968-2005)
- Address: Hanover House, 85 Hanover St; Liverpool, Merseyside, L1 3DZ; United Kingdom
- Location: Liverpool
- Coordinates: 53.40435°N 2.98225°W
- Owner: Epstein Entertainment Ltd
- Seating type: Reserved seating
- Capacity: 388

Listed Building – Grade II
- Official name: Neptune Theatre
- Designated: 14 March 1975
- Reference no.: 1187370
- Type: Theatre

Construction
- Built: 1911
- Opened: 1913
- Renovated: 2005
- Closed: Summer of 1967-1968, 2005-2011, 2019-2021, 2023-2025
- Reopened: 2025

Website
- www.epsteintheatre.co.uk

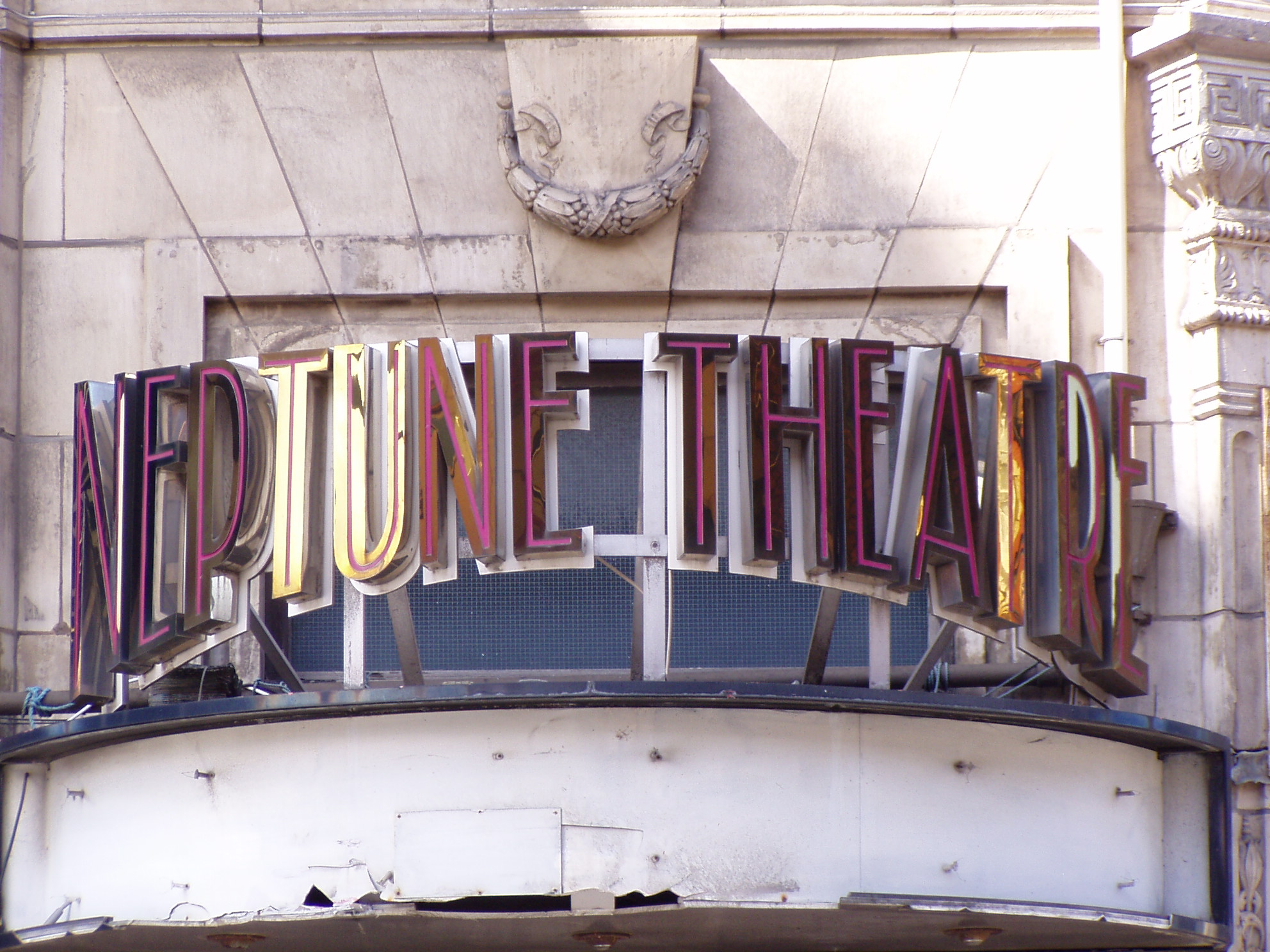

The Epstein Theatre, formerly Neptune Theatre, is a theatre in Liverpool, England. The theatre, a Grade II listed building, closed on 30 June 2023 following a decision by Liverpool City Council to end its financial support to the venue.

The venue has since reopened, although its future is not yet clear.

== History ==
The theatre originally opened in 1913 as Crane's Music Hall. The Crane Brothers' music store had been trading for several years when they opened the music hall above their store on Hanover Street in central Liverpool. Over the first few years, many amateur drama groups staged productions there, thus leading to its renaming as the Crane Theatre in 1938.

Little changed over the next twenty years, until Summer of 1967 when the Liverpool Corporation took over the ownership of the building spending £7,000 on a refurbishment including a front of house bar (now known as Brian's Bar), the stage was rebuilt and the Hanover House ‘Good's Lift’ was installed (located on school lane, granting access to stalls of the theatre only). Re-opening as "The Neptune" in 1968, the Liverpool Corporation believed that the theatre "should be ran by local people for local people". The name was selected due to Liverpool's links with the maritime through the Docks, an allusion to Neptune, the Roman god of the seas. One of the main reasons for the acquisition of the theatre from the Cranes was due to Brian Epstein opening up North End Music Store (NEMS) in Whitechapel, introducing competition they had previously not had to consider.

However, once again in 1993, the corporation, by now named Liverpool Council presented the theatre with the risk of closure. This caused a huge outcry around the city and many performers, including Dame Judi Dench, were part of the campaign to keep the theatre open. In order to attract audiences, a professional pantomime Snow White was staged in the theatre. This proved to be a huge success, with a professional panto then being held every year in the theatre.

Upon reopening in 2011 after the £1.2m refurbishment (as a result in closing in 2005 for health and safety reasons) the theatre was dedicated to the memory of Beatles manager Brian Epstein, for his contributions to the city's cultural and musical scene. Epstein was known to have also performed on the stage in the theatre as a child. Local artist Tony Brown offered a portrait of Epstein on permanent loan to the theatre and this now hangs in the bar.

Entertaining Liverpool since 1911, the Epstein has been a home to many, either that be performers (amateur or not), customers or avid theatre goers, therefore when it was announced to the public on 8 June 2023 that the theatre was closing once again due to insufficient funding for the lease after the council chose to retract the agreement with the theatre to subsidise the lease with £100,000 per year (the agreement existing since 1967), the news was greeted with the sorrows of all those who have fond memories of the establishment. The Liverpool City Council released a statement for their decision saying that, "it does not provide the best value for the tax payers money."

After 112 years of being a staple of Liverpool's Arts and Culture, and being closed down for the fourth time, the Epstein is to lay dormant for the foreseeable future until it is revived once again, truly earning its title as "The Theatre that Refuses to Die."

The theatre was chosen for a special BBC filming of Steve Coogan's Paul & Pauline Calf's Cheese and Ham Sandwich programme. It was the home of long-established Crosby Gilbert And Sullivan Society until 2016. Its striking interior has often been used as a location for film and TV productions.

== Refurbishment ==
After acquiring the theatre from the Crane's in 1967, the Liverpool Corporation decided to lease the building formally known as Crane's (now known as Hanover House) to Mr. David Ramsey since then the lease of the building has been distributed between the Ramsey's, To which the Council then subleased the building back off the Ramsey's to lease to the Epstein. As part of this lease the council in 1967 agreed to help subsidise the lease with £100,000 per year to the Epstein, helping with maintenance, utilities, and rent. This helped with the £7,000 refurbishment in 1967 (with it opening in 1968) and again in 2011 with £1.2 million refurbishment after the theatre laid dormant for 6 years. As of 2023, the council released a statement regarding their withdrawal with their deal saying that the theatre no longer, "provided the best value for the tax payer's money". Even after negotiations from Epstein Entertainment LTD for the Council to subsidise the lease by £50,000 per year, half of the price of their previous agreement the council denied the proposal leaving a lack of financial backing for the theatre to remain open. Leading to 8 June 2023 where it was released in a press statement given by Epstein Entertainment LTD that despite the business being solvent, that the theatre was to close on 30 June 2023, with the last show on 28 June 2023.

In 2005 the theatre closed for refurbishment, with an estimated reopening date of September 2007. In 2007 Liverpool City Council, who lease the Theatre from Mr. David Ramsey owner of the building, commissioned an independent valuation of the Theatre's rental value, after months of negotiations with no progression on the terms of the new lease. The refurbished theatre eventually reopened in May 2011. Since its refurbishment it has hosted pantomimes such as Snow White and the Seven Dwarfs starring Amanda Harrington from Desperate Scousewives and other charity events.
