= Brian D'Arcy =

Irish priest, writer, newspaper columnist, broadcaster, and preacher (born 1945)

Brian D'Arcy CP OBE (born 1 June 1945) is an Irish Passionist priest, writer, newspaper columnist, broadcaster, and preacher.

D'Arcy hosts a weekly radio programme each Sunday evening on BBC Radio Ulster.

He is the author of several books, including A Little Bit of Religion and A Little Bit of Healing.

== Early life and education ==
D'Arcy grew up in the village of Bellanaleck in County Fermanagh, Northern Ireland. His father Hugh worked at Enniskillen railway station and had been a notable Gaelic Athletic Association footballer in his youth. His primary education was in a local school while his secondary education was in the Christian Brothers Grammar School, Omagh. Having successfully sat the 11-plus exam, he entered St Michael's College, Enniskillen. He later studied scholastic philosophy at UCD.

In September 1962, at age 17, D'Arcy became a novice at the Passionist monastery in Enniskillen. A year later he was transferred to Mount Argus in Dublin. He was ordained a priest in December 1969.

He was sexually abused while a seminarian by a fellow Passionist.

== Pastoral ministry ==
In his early years as a priest, D'Arcy took it on himself to become acquainted with the showbusiness community in Dublin, visiting dancehalls seven nights a week and apparently hearing confessions from musicians and fans alike, a role he later described as being like 'an unofficial chaplain'. Such was his fame during this period that he reportedly became the inspiration for Dermot Morgan's character, Father Trendy.

D'Arcy has publicly opposed the existing disciplinary norms regarding clerical celibacy and has sought the possibility to ordain married priests. D'Arcy was warned in April 2012 that he must now submit his writings and broadcasts to an official censor.

D'Arcy has been a prominent supporter of Seán Quinn (once Ireland's richest billionaire) and his family in their court battles with the Irish state. D'Arcy spoke at a rally in July 2012 in protest against the High Court finding Sean Quinn Jnr and his cousin Peter Darragh Quinn in contempt of court for not complying with its order to produce the €451 million they had moved out of the state while owing it to the state. While Seán Jnr served his prison time, Peter Quinn (who was found in contempt on the basis of evidence including a video-tape of him in Ukraine detailing the crime) became a fugitive: in 2013 the High Court found Peter Quinn (in absentia) personally liable to repay €145 million of the money he illegally put out of reach of his creditors.

D'Arcy was a long-term friend of BBC Radio 2 presenter Terry Wogan, officiating at the weddings of his children. D'Arcy said that Wogan was atheist but spiritual, and that God would admit him to Heaven.

== Media career ==
D'Arcy hosts a weekly radio programme each Sunday evening on BBC Radio Ulster.

Since July 1976 he has written the Father Brian's Little Bit of Religion column for the Sunday World.

On 15 April 2007, D'Arcy replaced Canon Roger Royle on the long-standing BBC Radio 2 show Sunday Half Hour. On 23 January 2012, the BBC announced that D'Arcy would step down from this role and that Diane-Louise Jordan would succeed him. He left the show on 29 January 2012.

On 30 December 2021, he joined Tony Blackburn, Alan Dedicoat and Lynn Bowles as one of the contributors talking about radio presenter Terry Wogan on the Channel 5 retrospective programme Wogan: Now You're Talking.

== Awards ==
D'Arcy received an honorary degree from the University of Ulster. He accepted an OBE in June 2019.

== Response to the Murphy Report ==
After the publication of the Murphy Report, D'Arcy accused the Vatican of hiding behind legal procedures in not dealing with allegations of child abuse within the church. Following the report's publication, he has called for a radical re-formation of the church's structures and resignations of high-ranking figures within the Irish Catholic Church.
