= Monster Café =

1994 British children's television series

- Monster Café title card
- Genre: Children's; Comedy; Comedy horror
- Written by: Simon Davies
- Directed by: Philippa Langdale
- Creative director: Bob Steer
- Starring: Isobel Middleton; David Shimwell; Toby Sedgwick; Peta Lily; Richard Ashton
- Voices of: Simon Davies
- Narrated by: Marcel McCalla
- Theme music composer: Liz Kitchen
- Composers: Liz Kitchen (series 1); Jonathan Cohen (series 2)
- Country of origin: United Kingdom
- Original language: English
- No. of series: 2
- No. of episodes: 30

Production
- Executive producer: Judy Whitfield
- Producer: Alison Stewart
- Running time: 15 minutes

Original release
- Network: BBC One
- Release: 12 September 1994 – 21 December 1995

Monster Café is a Children's BBC comedy programme about three monsters working in Monster Café, where they meet weird monsters, serve weird food and battle with their evil boss, the Baroness. The series originally aired from 1994 to 1995.

The series was repeated on CBBC On Choice between 2000 and 2001, and on CBeebies in November 2007, but after complaints on the BBC Message Boards and direct to the BBC regarding how the programme "scared young children", it was pulled from the schedule after 4 episodes were shown.

== Characters ==
Frankie played by Isobel Middleton

Frankie is a female robot who works at the café as the manageress. She is the smartest of the trio and uses many of the gadgets on her body to help out with problems and to sometimes fight the Baroness.

Igor played by David Shimwell

Igor is a 1-trillion-millenniums-old Transylvanian man who has very poor hygiene (but claims it's an old Transylvanian custom). He also works at the café as the cook, and loves making potions and other weird concoctions. He also has a pet dustbin called Vinny. Igor also has a short temper, when he gets angry he has a 'Monster Wobbly' where he breathes fire and throws saucepans and custard pies (which always hit Skull) at other monsters.

Mummy played by Toby Sedgwick

Mummy is a 6000-year-old Egyptian mummy who works at the café as the caretaker. He is very dim-witted and often gets stuff wrong. He also pronounces his Ms as Rs (So he called himself Rummy). Mummy sleeps in a coffin.

Baroness de Monstro played by Peta Lily

The Baroness is the bad-tempered boss of the monsters. She also hates the monsters having any kind of fun and meals being given away for free. She created Frankie to help her manage the café.

=== Minor characters ===
Vinny the Bin

Igor's pet dustbin, who acts very much like a dog and will eat anything.

Skull voiced and puppeteered by Simon Davies

A talking skull who lives in the Monster Café. He always tells incredibly bad jokes and is often mistreated, by being turned into a cabbage by the Baroness or having a custard pie thrown at him by Igor.

Chas played by Richard Ashton

Monster Café's best and favourite customer. Chas loves eating slugs and talks with a very strong Birmingham accent.

Marcel McCalla narrates the show.

== Episodes ==
=== Series 1 ===
No.	Title	Original release date
1	"She's Back!"	12 September 1994
Frankie, Igor and Mummy must clean the cafe up before the Baroness returns, or face the direst of consequences – being turned into slugs.
2	"Monster Central Heating"	19 September 1994
The Baroness diverts the central heating from the cafe to her castle. Frankie can't survive in the cold, and it doesn't look like she'll be serving slug burgers or bogies in a bun for much longer.
3	"Igor's Monster Day"	26 September 1994
Igor is 216 years old today and this Monster Day is one that he will never forget, especially when the staff and customers start to disappear one by one.
4	"The Baroness Must Marry"	3 October 1994
The Baroness discovers that in order to inherit the castle, she will have to get married. And the lucky groom is none other than the monsters' pet bin Vinny.
5	"Someone Special for Lunch"	10 October 1994
Frankie, Igor and Mummy await the arrival of a very special lunch guest at the cafe. Who will it be?
6	"Monster Vision Song Contest"	17 October 1994
The cafe serves up a night to remember when it hosts the Monster Vision Song Contest, and Frankie, Igor and Mummy decide to participate.
7	"Vinny the Bin"	24 October 1994
Frankie, Igor and Mummy put their pet bin Vinny in training for an important race, but he proves to be more than the monsters can handle.
8	"Drastic Refurbishments"	31 October 1994
The Baroness has decided to refurbish the Monster Cafe into Merry Monster – and also shrink Mummy and trap him in the oven while she's at it. And she won't let him out unless Frankie and Igor get the place ready in time for Chas' arrival.
9	"Mummy for Sale"	7 November 1994
Cutbacks need to be made at the cafe. Someone must leave, and it turns out to be Mummy.
10	"Igor's Socks Escape"	14 November 1994
The Health Monster is due to visit the cafe, but at the same time, Igor's socks break out. Pretty soon, the cafe has a sock infestation.
11	"Igor's Monster Cookbook"	21 November 1994
The Monster TV Breakfast Time cook Kylie has been turned into a jar of pickled gherkins. Who can replace her? Maybe Igor and his Monster Cookbook might be able to help.
12	"Monster Hols"	28 November 1994
Frankie, Igor and Mummy are looking forward to their holiday, but the Baroness has other plans for them as she wants to turn the cafe into a wedding business.
13	"The Monster for Me"	5 December 1994
Mummy is all set for fame and stardom, and he gets the chance when the country and western singer Tammy Monster enters the cafe and wants somebody to star in an advert with her.
14	"Discombooberate!"	12 December 1994
The Baroness of the Year awards have arrived, and at the same time, Igor has been acting rather suspiciously. Could this be something to do with whatever he's inventing?
15	"The Final Conflict"	19 December 1994
Frankie is fed up of the Baroness bossing her, Igor and Mummy around, so the three of them hatch a plan to get rid of her.

=== Series 2 ===
No.	Title	Original release date
1	"Special Delivery"	14 September 1995
Frankie, Igor and Mummy hear that the Baroness has managed to escape from Neptune.
2	"Decommissioned"	21 September 1995
The Baroness relieves Frankie of her managerial duties and de-activates her. And the café's new manager? None other than Skull.
3	"Monster Lottery"	28 September 1995
Frankie, Igor and Mummy are hoping to win the jackpot on the Monster Lottery.
4	"Healthy Monster"	5 October 1995
The Healthy Monster returns to the cafe, but this time, he brings his mummy with him.
5	"Transylvanian Turnip"	12 October 1995
The battle is on to win the Best Vegetable competition, between the Baroness and her monster leek, and Igor's Auntie Vampira and her giant pumpkin.
6	"Doubley Doos"	19 October 1995
Frankie finds herself splitting into two when she drinks Igor's latest experiment.
7	"The Wind"	26 October 1995
It's a windy day at the cafe, and the monsters learn to never ignore an old wives tale when Mummy ends up stuck to the floor.
8	"Mummy Speaks"	2 November 1995
Mummy wants to speak properly, and half of the Professor's dreams come true...but which half?
9	"Twinkle Toes"	9 November 1995
The Baroness chooses Mummy as her partner for the Twinkle Toes Dance Competition.
10	"Baby"	16 November 1995
A carrycot is discovered in the cafe, and the monsters are left looking after the baby of someone very special indeed.
11	"Toothache Day"	23 November 1995
Igor is suffering from raging toothache. Will Mummy and Frankie be able to make the pancakes in time for the Merry Monster Party as well as get Igor's tooth out?
12	"Skunk Monster"	30 November 1995
The Skunk Monster returns in an attempt to make his mark on the cafe.
13	"A Bump on the Head"	7 December 1995
Frankie and Mummy attempt to put on a show for the Queen Monster, who is visiting the cafe. At the same time, Igor must reluctantly look after the Baroness when she bumps her head and loses her memory.
14	"Lovey Dovey Doughnuts"	14 December 1995
Igor doctors his doughnuts.
15	"Merry Monster Christmas"	21 December 1995
The Baroness cancels Christmas for the monsters, leaving them more fed up than usual.
