= Melvin and Maureen's Music-a-Grams =

British television series

- Genre: Children
- Starring: Sophie Aldred; Matthew Devitt
- Country of origin: United Kingdom
- Original language: English
- No. of series: 2
- No. of episodes: 26

Production
- Production location: UK
- Running time: 15 minutes

Original release
- Network: BBC
- Release: 9 January 1992 – 1 April 1993

Melvin and Maureen's Music-a-Grams is an educational CBBC show about music which ran from 1992 to 1993 (with repeat transmissions continuing until 2001), starring Sophie Aldred and Matthew Devitt. The show was rerun on CBeebies in 2007.

Melvin and Maureen ran a music shop which sold "Music-A-Grams"- a recording of music for a certain purpose. Sometimes customers came asking for a particular music-a-gram. Melvin and Maureen also sang songs, and told stories to illustrate how musical instruments could be used to create different effects, or on a particular theme. There was also a trio of stuffed toys, who resided in an odds-and-ends cupboard, and were on a constant quest for musical stardom. They appeared in every episode, but only their leader, Groovy Ted, spoke.

Apart from a few one-off characters, like the evil landlady in the third episode, and a spoof superhero character in a later episode, Matthew Dewitt and Sophie Aldred were the only actors in the show. When Melvin or Maureen spoke to a customer on the phone, the customer was always played by the other actor. In the final episode, Matthew Dewitt appeared as a talent scout, and a recording studio manager, and Sophie Aldred appeared in three roles- a bored receptionist at a recording studio, the receptionist at a record factory, and as a Top of The Pops presenter.

== Episodes ==
1. Pilot: Funniest Instrument: Melvin and Maureen are set a riddle by entertainer Mr. Baggage; what is the funniest instrument in the world?
2. The Wriggle: The gang try different types of dancing, then invent a style of their own, for dance workshop manager Tristram,
3. Dastardly Landlady: Melvin and Maureen use their music-a-grams to outwit their evil landlady. This episode contained almost no educational content, apart from a brief speech by Maureen about how music can invoke feelings. The episode featured three songs, and several slapstick sequences involving the landlady.
4. Repercussions: Melvin learns that a pair of his bongo drums may be priceless. Whilst he turns the music shop upside-down looking for them, he and Maureen also showcase the vast range of percussion instruments.
5. The Horrors- Another more light-hearted episode. Melvin and Maureen are conned into babysitting a friend's two bratty children, and try to use their music-a-grams to keep them entertained. The only educational content is a short film about traditional playground games involving singing.
6. Orchestra-ra-ra: Melvin and Maureen are asked to talk about the orchestra, but argue over who knows most
7. Celebration: Maureen awaits the results of a music exam
8. Guitar- Melvin & Maureen receive a request for a guitar music-a-gram from none other than her Majesty, the Queen. Unfortunately, neither of them can play the guitar. Can the window cleaner help?
9. Au Naturel: Maureen grows a musical tree. Meanwhile, Melvin prepares musical games for a children's party.
10. Supa Dupa Man: A superhero flies into the shop. He is bored of his jingle, and wants Melvin and Maureen to find him a new one. This episode showcases the use of music and sound effects in TV and radio plays.
11. Goldfish Cabaret: Melvin and Maureen compose a goldfish song and comedy routine. This episode was mostly light-hearted, though it featured a segment on setting words to music, featuring a team of musicians including former Playschool presenter Joanathan Cohen.
12. The Toys Make It Big; The series finale. A more light-hearted episode with little educational content- though it did show viewers what happens in a recording studio, and how vinyl records are made. Groovy Ted overhears Melvin and Maureen talking about a customer who requested a musical hat. He thinks they said "musical act", and falls into daydreams, resulting in a fantasy sequence showing the toys recording their song, and eventually appearing on Top of The Pops. They are woken by Melvin and Maureen at the end of the episode.

== Reception ==
Evening Standard television critic Victor Lewis-Smith praised the programme, writing "this series gives me hope, thanks to a terrific cast, Simon Davies's quixotic script, Alison Stewart's fearless production, and music by Will Hill and the legendary Jonathan Cohen (a stalwart of BBC children's music programmes)."
