= Mark Lowen =

British journalist

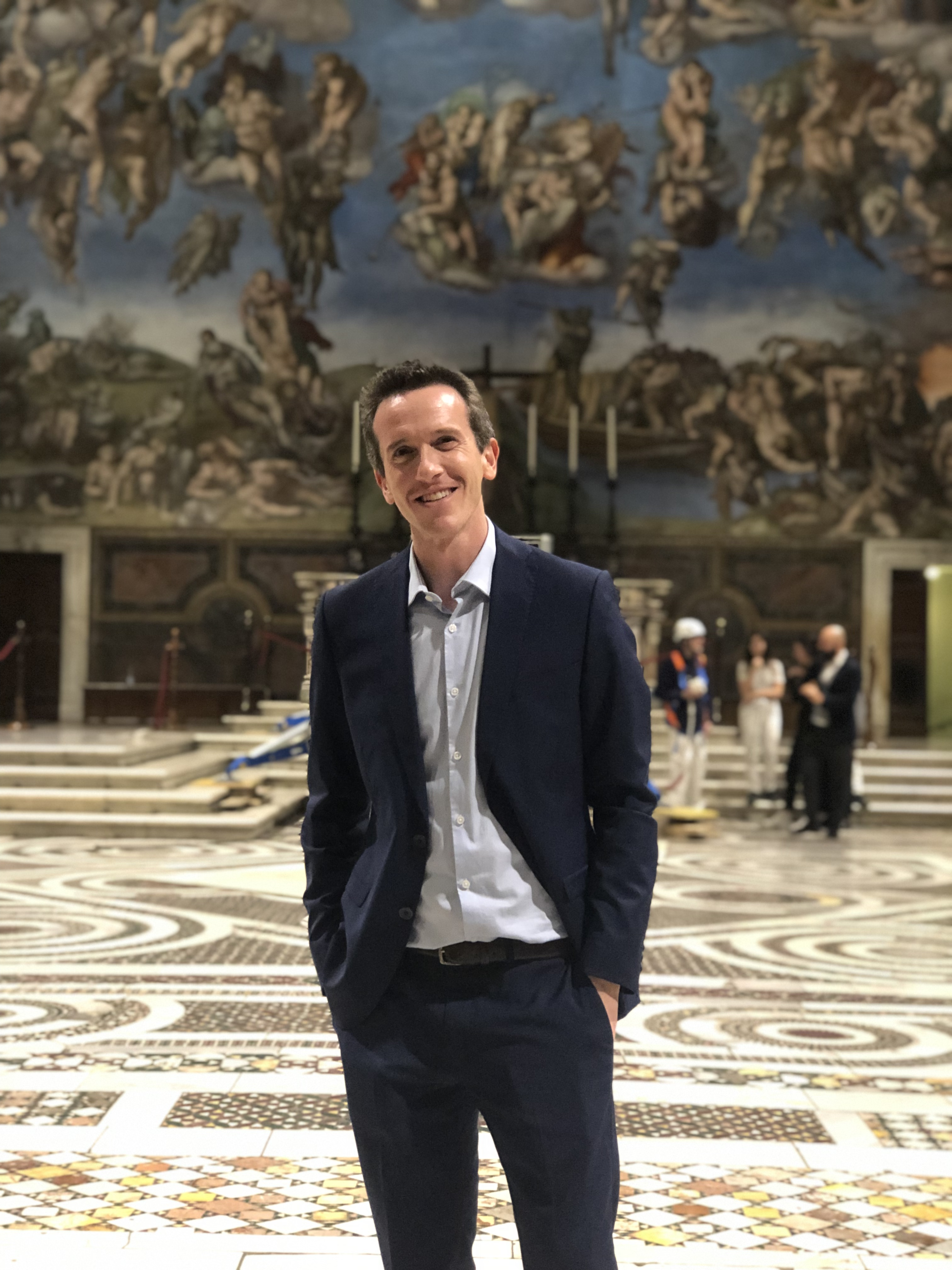
- Lowen in Italy
- Born: 2 June 1983 (age 43); London, United Kingdom
- Education: Balliol College, Oxford
- Alma mater: University of Oxford
- Occupation: Journalist
- Years active: 2005–Present
- Known for: BBC Presenter and Correspondent formerly based in Italy, Turkey, Greece and the Balkans
- Spouse: Pedro Penim 2018
- Children: 2
- Parent: Eve Karpf (mother)
- Relatives: Natalia Karp (grandmother); Josef Karpf (grandfather); Anne Karpf (aunt)

Mark Lowen (born 2 June 1983) is a British journalist who works for BBC News as a presenter and correspondent. He was previously based in Italy, Turkey, Greece and Serbia, and has reported from across the world since becoming a foreign correspondent in 2009.

== Education ==
Lowen attended Sheen Mount Primary School in Richmond upon Thames from which he was awarded a Scholarship in 1994 to King's College School, an independent school for boys in Wimbledon, followed by Balliol College at the University of Oxford, where he obtained a First Class degree in History and French.

== Life and career ==
Lowen joined the BBC's Paris bureau in 2005 as an intern, becoming a producer, followed by the BBC World Service in London in 2007 and BBC World News in 2008. He became the BBC Balkans correspondent based in Belgrade in 2009, covering the former republics of Yugoslavia and Albania, during which time he reported on the first elections in Kosovo since independence, the trial of Radovan Karadžić, and the arrest of the former Commander-in-Chief of the Bosnian Serb Army, Ratko Mladić.

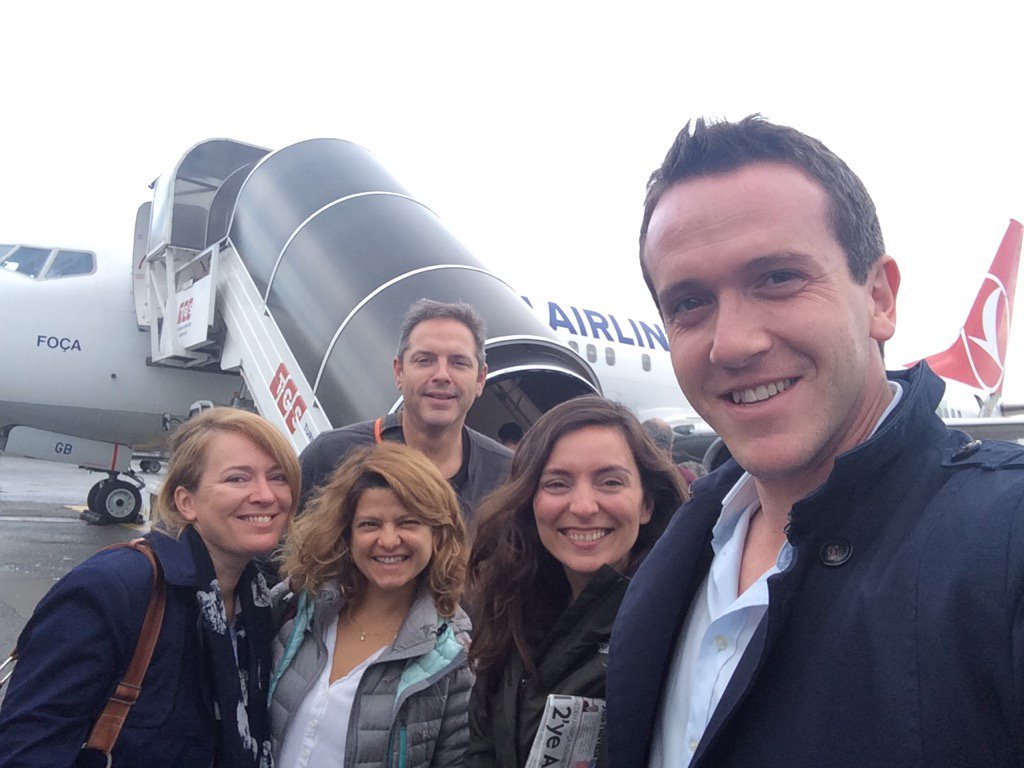
Mark Lowen and BBC Turkish team board a flight to cover Turkish election campaign, 23 October 2015

Lowen became BBC Athens correspondent in autumn 2011, replacing Malcolm Brabant, who had become seriously ill following a routine inoculation against yellow fever. He covered Greece's financial crisis in depth before moving to Istanbul in 2014. From there, he reported among other subjects on terror attacks, the attempted coup, the migrant crisis, the government of Recep Tayyip Erdoğan and the Syrian Civil War. In 2019, he became Rome correspondent for the BBC, covering Southern Europe, reporting extensively on the COVID-19 pandemic, the Vatican, and the rise of Giorgia Meloni.

He was shortlisted for Young Journalist of the Year at the Royal Television Society awards, 2013.

He presented OS on the BBC World Service and now presents on the BBC News Channel. In 2025, he was detained in Turkey and deported, after covering anti-government protests following the arrest of Ekrem Imamoglu, the Mayor of Istanbul.

== Family ==
Lowen's mother is the British actress Eve Karpf and his grandmother was Natalia Karp, née Weissman (1911–2007), a Jewish refugee from the Nazis and Holocaust survivor, whose story he told in a BBC broadcast and online report.

Lowen is married to Pedro Penim, a Portuguese actor and director of the D. Maria II National Theatre. In December 2022, Penim announced that he and Lowen had a daughter, born via surrogacy in Canada. Three years later, their son was born, carried by the same surrogate.
