= Sophie Aldred =

English actress, author

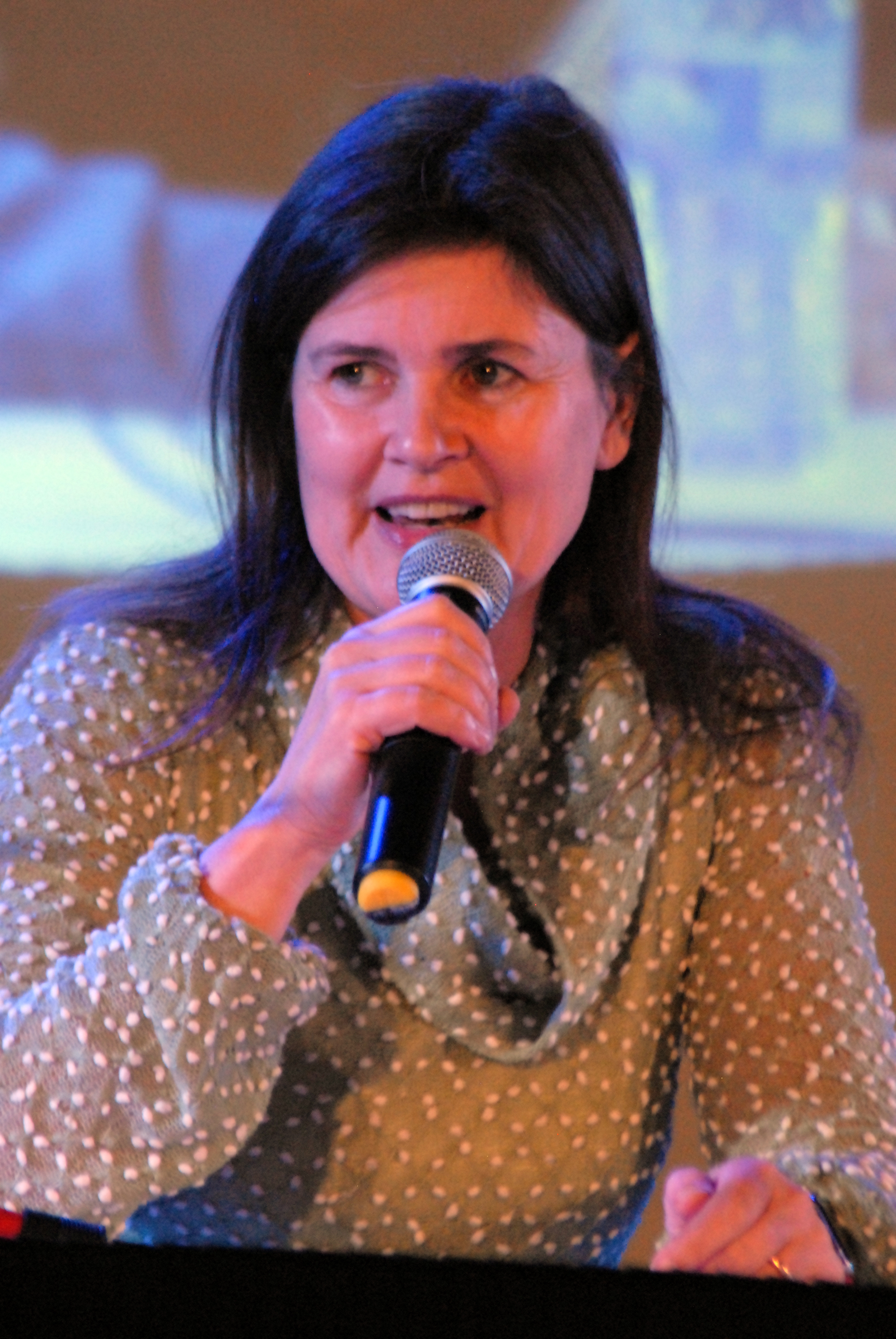
- Aldred at (Re)Generation 2 in 2016
- Born: 20 August 1962 (age 64); Greenwich, London, England
- Education: University of Manchester
- Occupations: Actress; television presenter; author
- Years active: 1987–present
- Known for: Ace in Doctor Who
- Spouse: Vince Henderson (m. 1997)
- Children: 2
- Website: sophiealdred.com

Sophie Aldred is an English actress, television presenter, and author. She has worked extensively in children's television as a presenter and voice artist. She played the Seventh Doctor's companion, Ace, in the television series Doctor Who during the late 1980s, becoming the final companion in the series' first run.

== Early life ==
Aldred was born in Greenwich, London, but grew up in nearby Blackheath. She sang in the church choir of St James', Kidbrooke, and attended Blackheath High School from 1973 until 1980. She then enrolled as a drama student at the University of Manchester. She graduated in 1983 and embarked on a career in children's theatre. She also sang in working men's clubs around Manchester.

== Career ==
In 1987, Aldred was cast as Ace in Doctor Who, initially for Dragonfire, the final story of the twenty-fourth season. Her tenure on the show spanned the last nine stories of the programme's original run, which ended in 1989.

In January 1992, she guest-starred in More than a Messiah, one of the videos in the series The Stranger, starring Colin Baker, also formerly of Doctor Who.

She voiceover in The Video Collection Children's Promo from 1993 1994 and 1995.

Both before and since Doctor Who, Aldred has had a varied and busy television career, particularly in children's programming, where she has presented educational programmes under the name "Sophie Socket" such as Corners, Melvin and Maureen's Music-a-grams (which ran from 1992 to '96), Tiny and Crew (which she presented, 1995–96), the BBC series Words and Pictures (1992, 1996–2001), and also the CITV paranormal show It's a Mystery in 1996. She also played the character Minnie The Mini Magician from series 8 onwards in CITV's ZZZap! between 1999 and 2001.

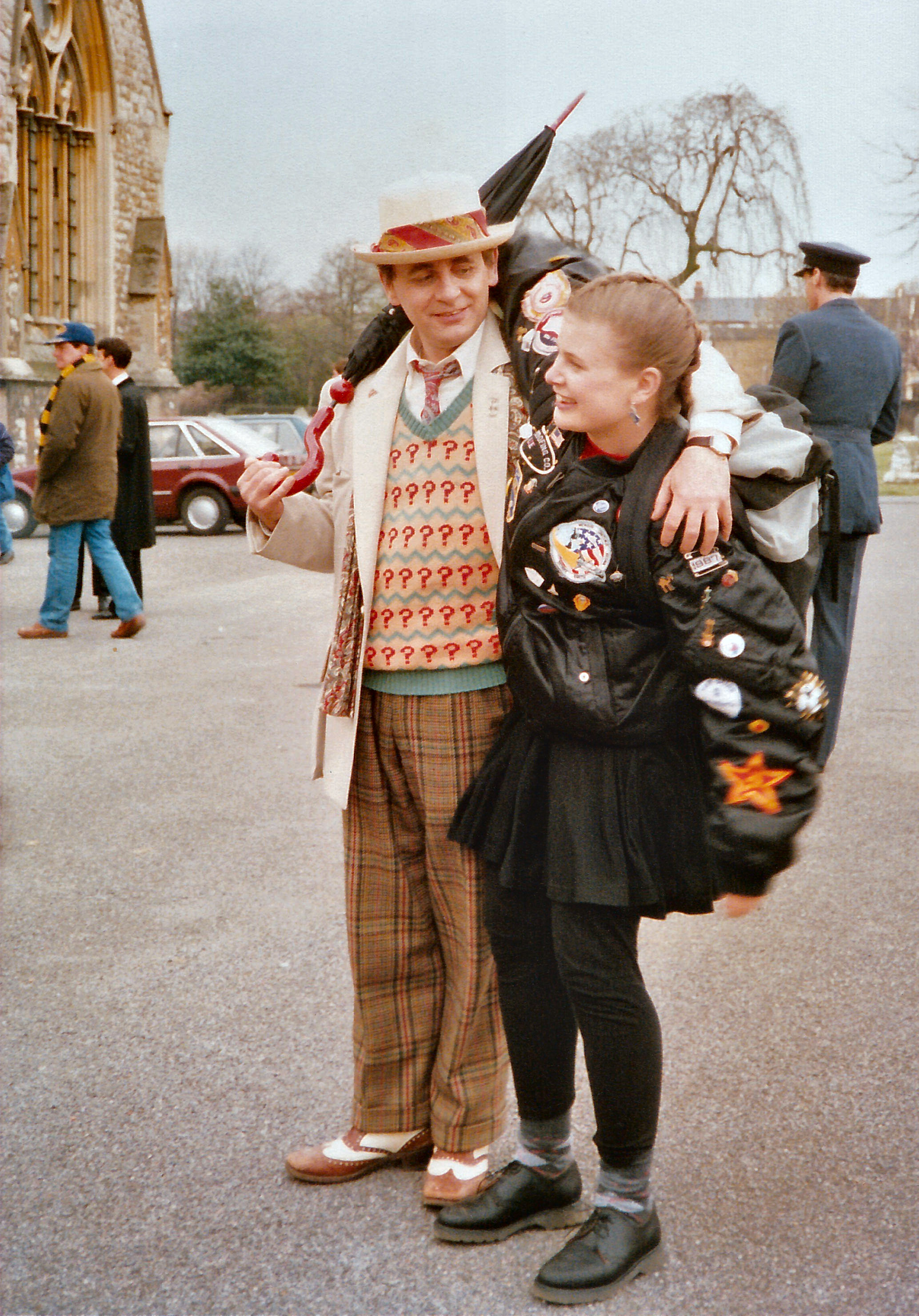
With Sylvester McCoy during filming of Remembrance of the Daleks (1988)

Aldred has presented and sung in several BBC Schools Radio series, including Singing Together, Music Workshop, Time and Tune and Music Box. She has also performed on radio and in the theatre. She has also reprised her role as Ace in the 1993 thirtieth-anniversary charity special Dimensions in Time and, since 2000, the Doctor Who audio plays produced by Big Finish Productions. Following the start of rumours in 1994 and 1995, avid Doctor Who fans expressed hope that Aldred would reprise her role in the project that would become the 1996 Doctor Who television movie, but she did not appear, and her character's fate was not mentioned.

Throughout the 2000s she has worked extensively as a voice-over artist for television advertisements, and has also provided voices for animated series such as Bob the Builder, Sergeant Stripes, the UK dubbed version of the CGI animated version of the Australian TV series Bananas in Pyjamas, El Nombre, Peter Rabbit, Noddy in Toyland, The Magic Key and Dennis & Gnasher.

She co-wrote with Mike Tucker the hardcover nonfiction book Ace, The Inside Story of the End of An Era, published by Virgin Publishing in 1996. (ISBN 1-85227-574-X).

Aldred provided voices for the 2009 series Dennis and Gnasher, including that of title character Dennis the Menace.

She was also a former presenter of the 1996 CITV Saturday morning magazine programme WOW!.

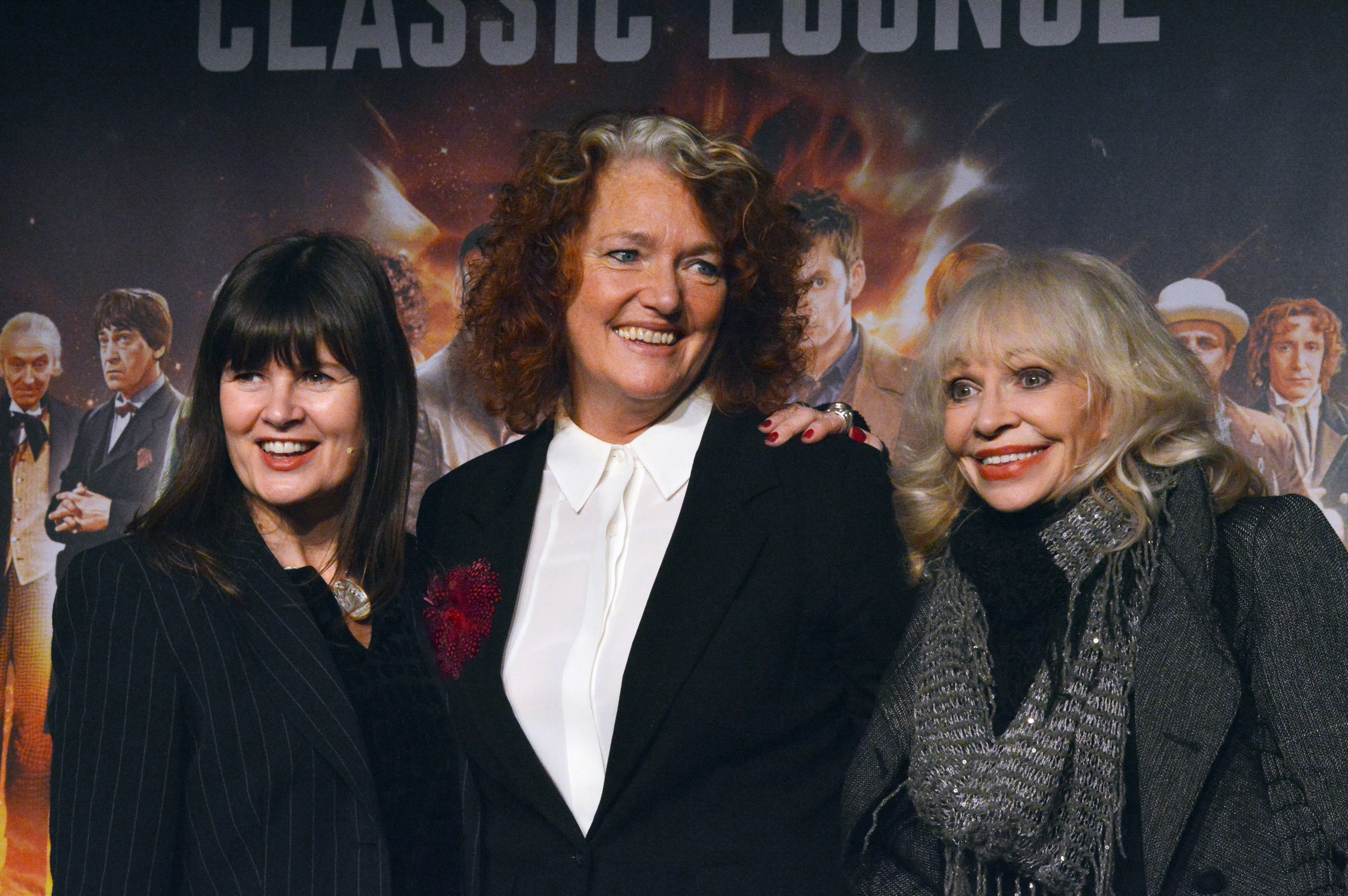
Aldred, Louise Jameson and Katy Manning at a Doctor Who 50th-anniversary event

Since 2012 Aldred has provided the voice of Tom in Tree Fu Tom, a CBeebies series. The series' other main voice actor, David Tennant (who voices Twigs), previously played the tenth incarnation of the Doctor in Doctor Who. In November 2013 she appeared in the one-off fiftieth-anniversary comedy homage The Five(ish) Doctors Reboot. In 2018, Aldred reprised the role of Ace in an audio drama set during the first season of Class.

In 2019, Aldred reprised the role of Ace in a special announcement trailer for the Doctor Who Season 26 Blu-ray box set. That same year, she also appeared as Mistress Na in the direct-to-DVD film Sil and the Devil Seeds of Arodor; a role for which she won Best Supporting Actress at the Accolade Competition in 2020.

In 2020, Aldred released the novel Doctor Who: At Childhood's End, where an older Ace (now a philanthropist) meets the Thirteenth Doctor and her companions while investigating an alien satellite.

Aldred reprised the role of Ace in the October 2022 Doctor Who BBC Centenary special "The Power of the Doctor" alongside Janet Fielding as Tegan Jovanka – who was also a companion of the Doctor during the series' original run and in the episode she reunites with Sylvester McCoy as the Seventh Doctor.

In a 2023 interview at Supanova Gold Coast, Aldred expressed her enthusiasm for returning to Doctor Who alongside Ncuti Gatwa's Doctor, saying, "Yeah, where’s the contract? I'll sign it!"

She also reprised the role in the series Tales of the TARDIS.

In 2024 she read several stories on the indie channel Divas, Dinosaurs and Demons, which also features fellow Big Finish actor Sadie Miller.

== Personal life ==
Aldred was in a relationship with fellow Manchester University student Tim Booth of the band James in the mid-1980s. She also had a relationship with comedian Les Dennis during his first marriage, which Dennis documented in his autobiography. She married television presenter and actor Vince Henderson on 12 July 1997. They have two sons. Aldred is allergic to cats and is a vegan.

== Filmography ==
Year	Title	Role	Notes
1992	More Than A Messiah	The Girl	
1994	Shakedown: Return of the Sontarans	Mari	
1994	The Zero Imperative	P.R. Officer	
1998	Mindgame	Human	
1998	Lust in Space	Sophie Aldred	
1999	Mindgame Trilogy	Space Pilot 6927896	
2011	Thriller Theater!	Lynn Whitlam	
2013	The Search for Simon	Angela Spooner	
2018	A Wizard's Tale	Voice	
2019	Sil and the Devil Seeds of Arodor	Mistress Na	

=== Television ===
Year	Title	Role	Notes
1987–1989, 2022	Doctor Who	Dorothy "Ace" McShane	32 episodes
1990	Rainbow	Birthday Guest	Voice; Episode: "Wrong Day"
1991	Melvin and Maureen's Music-a-grams	Maureen	9 episodes
1993	EastEnders	Suzie	2 episodes
1993	El Nombre	Consuela Chiquitita	Voice; all 26 episodes
1993	Dimensions in Time	Ace	TV film
1995	Tiny and Crew	Sophie Socket	Series 1
1995	Wimzie's House	Wimzie	Voice; 20 episodes
1996	It's a Mystery		Series 1
1996	WOW!		
1999–2001	ZZZap!	Minnie the Magic Magician	41 episodes
2000–2001	The Magic Key	Biff	Regular role
2001–2002	Death Comes to Time	Ace	All 5 episodes
2002–2004	Sergeant Stripes	Stripes	Voice; 7 episodes
2004	Shadow Play	Ros	4 episodes
2009	Noddy in Toyland	Lindy	Voice; 5 episodes
2009–2010	Dennis & Gnasher	Dennis	Voice; 25 episodes
2010–2011	Bob the Builder	Muck (US)	Voice
2011–2013	Bananas in Pyjamas	Morgan (UK)	Voice
2012	Tree Fu Tom	Tom (UK version), Racquette, Puffy	Voice; 30 episodes
2013	The Five(ish) Doctors Reboot	Sophie Aldred	TV film
2016	Peter Rabbit	Mrs Rabbit	Voice; 7 episodes
2016	Cops and Monsters	Lady Audrey MacDiarmid	Episode: "Revolution in a Teacup"
2020	Gentrification	Tabitha	All 9 episodes
2023	Tales of the TARDIS	Dorothy "Ace" McShane	Episode: "The Curse of Fenric"

=== Video games ===
Year	Title	Voice Role
2003	Pure Pinball	Excessive Speed Announcer
2011	Inazuma Irebun GO: Shine	
2011	Inazuma Irebun GO: Dark	
2014	Dragon Age: Inquisition	Additional voices
2018	Ni no Kuni II: Revenant Kingdom	

=== Audio ===
Year	Title	Author
2008	Candyfloss	Jacqueline Wilson
2018	Skyward	Brandon Sanderson
2019	Starsight	Brandon Sanderson
2021	Cytonic	Brandon Sanderson
2021	Defiant	
2020	The Doors of Eden	Adrian Tchaikovsky
2021	Shards of Earth	Adrian Tchaikovsky
2022	Eyes of the Void	Adrian Tchaikovsky
2023	Lords of Uncreation	Adrian Tchaikovsky
2025	Shroud	Adrian Tchaikovsky

Preceded by Gary Gillatt	Doctor Who Magazine Editor; 1997	Succeeded by Gary Gillatt
