= Natalia Karp =

Polish musician (1911 - 2007)

- Born: Natalia Weissman; February 27, 1911; Kraków, Grand Duchy of Kraków, Austria-Hungary
- Died: July 9, 2007 (aged 96); London, United Kingdom
- Education: Hebrew school
- Occupation: Pianist
- Years active: 1929–2006
- Spouses: Julius Hubler (m. 1933; died 1939); Josef Karpf (m. 1946; died 1993)
- Children: 2, including Eve
- Parent(s): Isidor Weissman (father); Estef Weissman (mother)
- Relatives: Mark Lowen (grandson)

Natalia Karp (née Weissman; 27 February 1911 – 9 July 2007) was a Polish concert pianist and Holocaust survivor.

== Early life ==
Natalia Karp was born to a Jewish family in Kraków, Grand Duchy of Kraków (now Poland), where she began learning piano at the age of four. At the age of thirteen, she moved to Berlin, and, by eighteen, she made her debut with the Berlin Philharmonic; however, she returned to Poland almost immediately due to the death of her mother, and married Julius Hubler, a lawyer who disapproved of her performing.

== Holocaust ==
In 1943, after the death of her husband in a bomb raid, Karp was sent to the Kraków-Płaszów concentration camp where she came into contact with Amon Göth. On his birthday, Göth ordered her to play for him and was impressed enough with her performance to spare not only her life but that of her sister as well. She chose to play Chopin's Nocturne in C-sharp minor, and would in later years be known for her interpretations of his pieces. Eventually, she and her sister were sent to Auschwitz, but both survived the war. Her grandson, Mark Lowen, a BBC journalist (and BBC Turkey Correspondent), wrote her story in 2011. He talked of Natalia and ties the story to Jamila Kolonomos of the Republic of North Macedonia, which lost 98% of its Jewish population. Jamila also survived the war by hiding and then joining Tito's partisan resistance. Eighteen of her relatives were murdered.

== Postwar career ==
Following the war, Natalia resumed her musical studies, and married a Polish diplomat named Josef Karpf. After claiming political asylum in London, she went on to give birth to two daughters. Upon dropping the "f" from her professional name, Karp went on to perform with the Krakow Philharmonic. She performed for Oskar Schindler, who had saved many of the Jews in the Kraków-Płaszów concentration camp; made nine tours of Germany; and continued to perform into her nineties. She would often play with a pink handkerchief on the piano, a handkerchief that she had bought shortly after the war as a symbol of the femininity she felt she had lost during her time in the concentration camps. One of her two daughters, journalist Anne Karpf, wrote a book detailing her parents' experiences in The War After: Living with the Holocaust, which was published in 1996. Her other daughter is the actress Eve Karpf.
