= The Princess and the Pea (2002 film) =

- Home video cover art
- Directed by: Mark Swan
- Written by: Ken Cromar; Forrest S. Baker; Mark Swan; Ray Goldrup
- Based on: "The Princess and the Pea" by Hans Christian Andersen
- Produced by: Don Judd
- Starring: Amanda Waving; Steven Webb; Jonathan Firth; Dan Finnerty; Nigel Lambert; Lincoln Hoppe; Ronan Vibert; Eve Karpf; Liz May Brice; Richard Ridings; Patsy Rowlands
- Edited by: Stephen I. Johnson A.C.E.
- Music by: Alan Williams
- Production companies: Feature Films for Families; Swan Animation
- Distributed by: Feature Films for Families
- Release date: August 16, 2002
- Running time: 85 minutes
- Countries: United Kingdom; United States; Hungary
- Language: English

The Princess and the Pea is a 2002 animated musical fantasy film adaptation of the popular 1835 fairy tale "The Princess and the Pea" by Hans Christian Andersen. The film was directed by Mark Swan. It was released August 16, 2002, as an American-Hungarian production of Feature Films for Families & Swan Productions. The scriptwriters were Forrest S. Baker and Ken Cromar.

The film won two Accolade Competition Awards of Excellence In 2003 and 2004, both for the musical score by composer Alan Williams. The film was also nominated for a Young Artist Award in 2003, in the category of "Best Family Feature Film — Animation".

== Plot ==
War and famine have destroyed the glory of the old Kingdom of Corazion since the story of how a princess was discovered by a pea became lost. It is written that if the Legend of the Pea is lost, the Kingdom will fall under the reign of the 18th king, who happens to be the selfish and greedy Prince Laird. With the help of the royal raven Sebastian and the young Prince Rollo of Arveya, Laird's noble and kind younger brother, Prince Heath, is crowned King by being the "first" son to enter the throne room. Heath sentences Laird to become ruler of the Pig Kingdom, where the older brother vows revenge.

Nine months later, Heath's wife Mariana dies giving birth to their daughter Daria. Laird conceives a plan to regain the crown. He swaps Daria with his own daughter, Hildegard, and gives Daria away to lazy pig herders. Hildegard is raised as a wicked and vain princess, while Daria grows into a kind and gentle young woman, forced to work for her lazy foster family but loved by her animal companions.

Prince Rollo, on his quest to find a bride, meets Daria and her trusted pig companions; Princess, Hungry, and Fearless. She brings him to her "secret place", where Rollo is charmed by her beauty and kindness, but rejects the idea of marrying her since she is not a princess. After a disappointing series of encounters with beautiful, but spoiled princesses, Rollo realizes he should not love someone because of their titles, but because of who they are. He resolves to find Daria again to confess his feelings for her. Meanwhile, Sebastian has been searching for a lost prophecy that explains the pea legend. Disappointed with Hildegard's upbringing, King Heath decides to disinherit her and leave his kingdom to Rollo and his bride-to-be.

Learning about Heath's plan, Laird turns the entire Pig Kingdom against Daria, claiming her to be a witch who can talk to animals. A mob pursues Daria through the forest and burns down her hiding place. Sebastian finally discovers the full prophecy in Daria's hiding place, which reveals that the true princess is one of such sensitivity that she cannot sleep on a pea hidden beneath twenty mattresses. While mourning Daria, whom he believes to be dead, Rollo decides to go through with marrying Hildegard, whom he initially rejected.

Daria tries to find Rollo in the neighboring kingdom but is rudely pushed aside by its people. She helps a servant who fell and hurt herself walk to the castle. Seeing Sebastian's twenty feather beds, Daria decides to lie down for a moment. Sebastian decides to test the pea within the mattress on the girl. Daria finds that she is unable to sleep, as there is something hard underneath. Seeing this, Sebastian deduces that Daria is the true princess. He then sees Daria's birthmark, realizing that she is Heath's real daughter. The raven plans to tell everyone about the birthmark but is intercepted when Laird captures him. He escapes with the help of Fearless and interrupts the wedding, exposing Hildegard's fraudulent birthmark (painted on) and revealing Daria's identity.

Desperate, Laird holds Daria hostage and tries to eliminate Rollo, but is defeated and falls into the castle moat along with Hildegard. They are then arrested for their transgressions. The film concludes with the reunion of Daria with her father, King Heath, followed by her marriage to Prince Rollo, which marks the beginning of a new golden age for the ancient kingdom.

== Voice cast ==
- Amanda Waving as Princess Daria
  - Kirsten Benton as Princess Daria's singing voice
- Jonathan Firth as Prince Rollo
  - Dan Finnerty as Prince Rollo's singing voice
  - Steven Webb as young Prince Rollo
- Nigel Lambert as Sebastian the Raven
- Lincoln Hoppe as King Heath of the Corazion Kingdom
- Ronan Vibert as King Laird of the Pig Kingdom
- Eve Karpf as Queen Helsa
- Liz May Brice as Princess Hildegard
- Richard Ridings as King Windham, Button
- Patsy Rowlands as Sasha the Maid
