= Corners (TV series) =

- Presented by: Simon Davies; Tracy Brabin; Sophie Aldred; Steve Johnson; Diane-Louise Jordan
- Starring: Robin Stevens
- Country of origin: United Kingdom
- Original language: English
- No. of seasons: 5
- No. of episodes: 94

Production
- Executive producer: Alison Stewart
- Production location: BBC Television Centre
- Camera setup: Multi-Camera
- Running time: 15 minutes
- Production company: BBC

Original release
- Release: 21 January 1987 – 22 December 1991

Corners is a Children's BBC children's television series of the 1980s. Produced by Alison Stewart, the format of the programme was that viewers would submit questions and queries (usually general knowledge, but sometimes metaphysical or scientific), and the two hosts, Tracy Brabin (later Sophie Aldred and then Diane-Louise Jordan) and Simon Davies, would try to answer the questions, aided by an anthropomorphised animal puppet, Jo Corner, who was performed and puppeteered by Robin Stevens (who later performed as Jim on Ragdoll's Rosie & Jim & Tom on Ragdoll's Tots TV). Being children's programming, the explanations used humour to convey information and frequently involved demonstrations which degenerated into slapstick humour. Songs were also used. A show with a similar format, "Dear Mr. Barker", aired on CBBC in the mid-1990s, but did not last long.

The co-presenter of the show for most of its run was Sophie Aldred, who concurrently became famous for playing the role of Ace in the television series Doctor Who (in one segment, Aldred met Keff McCulloch to discover how the new Doctor Who theme tune was composed). The other was Simon Davies, whose career continues as a writer and performer. Tracy Brabin hosted the first series with Davies. Steve Johnson replaced Davies for the third series, with the two alternating co-hosting duties thereafter. Diane-Louise Jordan also presented in place of Aldred for part of the fourth series.
