= Sergeant Stripes (TV series) =

- Genre: Cartoon series Children's; Comedy
- Created by: David Bonner
- Written by: Jimmy Hibbert; Diane Redmond; David Bonner
- Directed by: Nikolay Moustakov
- Voices of: Sophie Aldred; Jimmy Hibbert; Eve Karpf
- Opening theme: "He's the itty bitty kitty, protecting the city..."
- Composers: Kick Productions; PK Studios
- Country of origin: United Kingdom
- Original language: English
- No. of seasons: 2
- No. of episodes: 26

Production
- Executive producers: Theresa Plummer-Andrews; Adrian Ross
- Producer: Richard Randolph
- Running time: 10 minutes
- Production companies: Ealing Animation; A Works TV; VGI Entertainment

Original release
- Network: CBeebies, BBC Two
- Release: 1 September 2003 – 9 December 2004

Sergeant Stripes is a TV series created by David Bonner which first aired on CBeebies on 1 September 2003. The show follows the story of Stripes, a cute gray cat who lives in a sleepy provincial police station with little Katie and her father, PC Harker. Both they and pretty Sergeant Parker think Stripes is merely a cat.

== Characters ==
=== The Police Station ===
- Sergeant Stripes - The main character, a cat who lives in a sleepy provincial police station.
- Katie - A little girl, the fond owner of Stripes.
- PC Harker - A policeman and Katie's father.
- Sergeant Parker - A policewoman.

=== Work Colleagues ===
- Fluffy Mouse - A pink mouse, one of Sergeant Stripes' colleagues.
- Arabella the Giraffe - A giraffe and another of Sergeant Stripes' colleagues.
- Inspector Hector - A moth-eaten teddy bear and the bossy superior of Sergeant Stripes and his colleagues.

=== Townspeople ===
- Mr. and Mrs. Peppermint - Kind and polite pigs who run the local sweet shop.
- Mrs. Draper - A fussy vole.
- Mr. Draper - Mrs. Draper's put-upon husband.
- Mr. Pearson - A snooty fox who runs the bank.
- Pip Pig - A piglet who likes to play with toys.
- The Little Ferret Children - A pair of small ferrets, a boy and a girl.
- Susie Sycamore - A squirrel.
- Mr. and Mrs. Merry - Hippos who run the local funfair.
- Ronnie Rabbit - A greedy rabbit who often steals from Mr. Peppermint's sweet shop.
- Fire Chief Ash - The local fireman.

== Voice cast ==
- Sophie Aldred - Sergeant Stripes, Katie, Fluffy Mouse, Ferret Girl, Susie Sycamore, Mrs. Merry
- Jimmy Hibbert - PC Harker, Inspector Hector, Mr. Peppermint, Mr. Draper, Mr. Pearson, Pip Pig, Ferret Boy, Mr. Merry, Ronnie Rabbit, Fire Chief Ash
- Eve Karpf - Sergeant Parker, Arabella the Giraffe, Mrs. Peppermint, Mrs. Draper

== Episodes ==
=== Series 1 (2003) ===
No.	Title	Original release date
1	"The Key Mystery"	1 September 2003
Sergeant Stripes searches for Mr. Draper's lost key. Fluffy Mouse wants to help, but she doesn't know what a key is and takes Mr. Peppermint's hammer by mistake.
2	"Here Be Dragons"	3 September 2003
Sergeant Stripes gets a fire engine to counter the Dragon and its fire. It turns out to be a hoax and Stripes accidentally douses a steam engine.
3	"A Slippery Customer"	4 September 2003
Sergeant Stripes and Arabella look around town for the slug criminal Stanley. After Arabella gets into a tangle, she is mistaken for a slug and makes a mess inside the police station.
4	"The Monkey Mystery"	5 September 2003
Sergeant Stripes is assigned to look after Paolo a circus spider-monkey, while investigating a series of thefts. It turns out Paolo is responsible for the thefts.
5	"On Yer Bike!"	8 September 2003
Arabella reluctantly lends her bike to Inspector Hector for a charity race. Sergeant Stripes is able to reunite Mike the bike and Arabella in time for the race.
6	"The Case of the Missing Coppers"	9 September 2003
While looking for his absent colleagues, Sergeant Stripes causes chaos around town and assuming that the townsfolk are wasting police time.
7	"There's No Such Thing as Monsters"	10 September 2003
Stripes has to convince the public and his own policing team that monsters do not exist.
8	"Treasure Ahoy!"	11 September 2003
Inspector Hector has a forgetful day and arrives at the station with no uniform on.
9	"School's out"	12 September 2003
Inspector Hector tries to get out of giving a talk by faking a sore throat; Stripes gives a talk in the school.
10	"Stripes Gets a Fright"	16 September 2003
Stripes and the team investigate when a horse goes missing from a fairground merry-go-round, and end up in a ghost train.
11	"Seeing Double"	17 September 2003
An imposter has disguised himself as Inspector Hector and is up to trouble. He tricks Sergeant Stripes and the team to investigate imaginary crimes around town and later, he heads off to the town bank to do a security check of the vaults, which of course, he actually robs! Somebody has to stop him!
12	"On the Button"	18 September 2003
Sergeant Stripes sets out to look for a missing shirt button. The case is interrupted by Arabella stranded on a barge.
13	"The Bicycle Thieves"	19 September 2003
One morning, Inspector Hector arrives late at the police station, because He apparently went to the dry cleaners to get his uniform cleaned after spilling some porridge on it, so He now has to wear a temporary uniform for the rest of the day until his main one has been cleaned and dried. However, the park keeper who manages the town park soon calls the police station to report that there's someone vandalising the pond, so Sergeant Stripes and the team immediately race into action to investigate the problem at the park. However, Arabella soon finds out that Mike the bike has gone missing! Wherever could He be?

=== Series 2 (2004) ===
No.	Title	Original release date
1	"Who's Got the Peppermint Creams?"	1 November 2004
2	"A Chain's as Good as a Rest"	2 November 2004
It's the Mayor's Parade - but who has the Mayor's pendant?
3	"Painting Lessons"	4 November 2004
4	"Fluffy Mouse Solves the Mystery"	5 November 2004
5	"Aaatchoo"	8 November 2004
6	"Birthday Burglar"	9 November 2004
7	"Invasion of the Giant Vegetables"	10 November 2004
Veggies on the loose.
8	"Suitcase Swap"	11 November 2004
9	"Game, Set and Match"	12 November 2004
10	"And they Call it Kitty Love"	15 November 2004
11	"Stripes in Charge"	17 November 2004
12	"No Tea for Hector"	9 December 2004
13	"Footprints"	17 December 2004
