= The Lampies =

British television series

- Genre: Comedy; Entertainment; Adventure
- Created by: Dave Bonner
- Developed by: Red Balloo Productions
- Written by: David Bonner; Jimmy Hibbert
- Directed by: Dean Roberts; Mark Marren
- Voices of: Jimmy Hibbert; Eve Karpf; Rob Rackstraw; Susan Sheridan
- Theme music composer: Mcasso
- Composer: Mcasso
- Country of origin: United Kingdom
- Original language: English
- No. of series: 2
- No. of episodes: 46

Production
- Executive producers: Theresa Plummer-Andrews; James Coldwell
- Producer: Morgan Francis
- Cinematography: Mark Edwards
- Editors: Mark Edwards; Rory Timoney
- Running time: 15 minutes per episode (approx.)
- Production company: Red Balloo Productions

Original release
- Network: CBBC
- Release: 12 October 2000 – 19 July 2002

The Lampies is a British animated children's television series created by David Bonner and produced by Red Balloo Productions in conjunction with Uli Meyer Animation Studios for the BBC.

== Plot ==
A group of friendly sprite-like power engineers maintain and defend the lamp post "HO32" which is the critical area of the entire Lighting Network. The Roons, who live with their only leader, Arch Roon, in the dark sewers below, are the green yellow-eyed creatures who always plan to threaten the whole Lighting Network due to their strong dislike of light. Sewer rats can still also prove to be a pest to the Lampies themselves.

== Characters and Voice Cast ==
=== The Lampies Crew ===
- Burnout (voiced by Jimmy Hibbert) – The friendly laid back foreman of the Lampies who always runs scheduled switches for the lamp light. He has green skin and white hair as well as a white moustache, and he always wears a dark blue jumpsuit. "Jumping fuses!" remains as Burnout's catchphrase.
- Spotlight (voiced by Eve Karpf) – The routine inspector of the Lampies. She acts like the mother to all the other Lampies. She has green skin, just like Burnout, has lavender hair and she (mostly) wears glasses as well as a pink jumpsuit, similar to Livewire.
- Charge (voiced by Rob Rackstraw) – The clumsy, day-dreaming assistant worker of the Lampies who has blue skin as well as blue hair. He is the most prone to problems. He wears a yellow jumpsuit, just like Contact. There remains a running gag involving Charge always falling into H032's control room through the circular hole in the ceiling.
- Contact (voiced by Susan Sheridan) – The serious and sensible computer operator of the Lampies with purple skin and red hair who always has her young niece, Livewire. She always wears a blue hat as well as a yellow jumpsuit, just like Charge.
- Livewire (voiced by Susan Sheridan) – Contact's young "niece", who has pale peach skin as well as pink hair. Livewire speaks in a high-pitched voice, and (most of the time,) she wears a pink jumpsuit, similar to Spotlight. She is often pushed around by the lamppost's grown-ups, nevertheless she manages to save the day several times. Livewire manages to play with "Dustywugg", her best friend, whenever she can do so.
- Dustywugg the Dog (voiced by Jimmy Hibbert) – A furry sprite who serves as the Lampies' pet and mascot. He has orange fur and enjoys playing where possible with his owner, Livewire. Dustywugg can be quite cheeky at times, but the grown-ups, including Contact, always understand.
- Captain Bright Light (voiced by Jimmy Hibbert) – The absent-minded captain and leader of the Lampies with pale skin, brown hair. Captain Bright Light always wears a dark green jumpsuit. He has an older brother, Flash Light, who is bigger and stronger, yet he is not as brave as Bright Light himself. "Shortened Circuits" remains as Captain Bright Light's catchphrase.

=== Antagonists ===
- The Roons (voiced by Jimmy Hibbert and Rob Rackstraw) – A big group of green-faced creatures with yellow eyes, who live in the dark sewer just below the Lampies world. They remain absolutely afraid of light (even when it comes to small torches) and constantly try to break all the streetlights around the network.
- Arch Roon (voiced by Jimmy Hibbert) – The leader of the Roons who mostly stays in the yard in the sewers, even though he does not show any signs of fear of the light. The only person he actually fears is his own mother.

=== Other characters ===
- Brigadier Big Beam (voiced by Rob Rackstraw) – The superior organiser of the whole Lighting Network. He has purple skin, just like Contact, has white hair and wears a green uniform.
- Phosphorous (voiced by Eve Karpf) – The Brigadier's officer liaison, Contact's friend, and Charge's love interest. She has pale skin, brown hair and wears a yellow shirt and red skirt.
- Captain Spentflint – Formerly the Lampies' captain, who is now retired. Criticised as a slave driver.
- Spark (voiced by Rob Rackstraw) – Livewire's well-behaved friend who is the keeper of a bike light. People like him are called Bikeys.
- Neon – A one-off character for the show's series 2 opener - features in the "Light Up the World for Christmas" single who only appears in the episodes Neon and Boogie Lights.
- Haywire (voiced by Rob Rackstraw) – A one-off character in series 1 episode 11 "Bouncer" who is Burnout's cousin, living in Lamppost HY11 in sector 14.
- Bouncer the Grasshopper (voiced by Eve Karpf) – The chattering, gossiping and friendly green grasshopper with light blue eyes. She only appears in Series 1 Episode 11 "Bouncer" and is mentioned by quite a few of the main Lampies members themselves, including Burnout.
- Captain Spectrum (voiced by Rob Rackstraw) – a superhero, who is star of his own TV show, popular both among human children and young Lampies. He is Dustywugg's idol.
- Flash Light (voiced by Rob Rackstraw) - Captain Bright Light's brother who is mentioned by Bright Light himself in the episode "Flash By Name".
- Boris the Bat (voiced by Jimmy Hibbert) - A male pipistrelle bat who only appears in the episode "Boris". Boris proves to be a good friend to the Lampies.
- Geoff the Alien (voiced by Rob Rackstraw) - A male alien who only appears in the episodes "The Inspection", "The Vacation" and "Space Walk".
- PJ (voiced by Susan Sheridan) - A young human boy with brown hair and brown eyes who lives in one of the houses in the town with his parents. He only appears in the episode "The Boy Who Could See The Lampies". PJ eventually becomes friendly with Livewire and Spark, and in return, he offers them a free ride on board his toy train in his bedroom.

== Episodes ==
=== Series 1 ===
#	Title	Summary	Air Date
1	Captain Who	The roons invade H032, but the newly recruited Captain Bright Light repels them.	12 October 2000
2	Dustywugg: Space Marine	With the H032 crew captured by the Roons, Dustywugg inspired by Captain Spectrum, goes superhero.	19 October 2000
3	Walkabout	Charge runs away from H032, along with Dustywugg the Dog following him. They both get lost in the sewers, but, in the end, Dustywugg finds the way back.	26 October 2000
4	The Inspection	The H032 crew to try to clean their home in time for the Brigadier's inspection, when Jeff the alien arrives with just what they need.	2 November 2000
5	Flash By Name	Captain Bright Light dreads a visit from his brother, Flash Light. However, Flash Light is not what he first appears to be.	9 November 2000
6	Dustywuppy	Livewire, Dustywugg's owner, adopts a blue Dustywuppy who turns out to be extremely messy. Eventually, he is returned to his rightful owners, and all is well.	16 November 2000
7	Bird's Nest Oops	As Charge tries to fix a malfunction in H032, a pigeon mistakes him for her baby. The Lampies solve the malfunction and fix HO32.	23 November 2000
8	A Bit Of A Jam	Fed up with being pushed around by HO32's grown-ups, Livewire leaves the lamppost "all alone", and she manages to thwart a Roon plot to short circuit the whole lamppost.	30 November 2000
9	Bikey	Spark the Bikey visits the Lampies and, later that night, Livewire, who is Contact's niece, pays him an exchange visit.	7 December 2000
10	Thunder and Frightening	The Lampies are missing a Denby Attecorn to prevent the worst during a thunderstorm. Contact manages to get one in time to save HO32.	14 December 2000
11	Bouncer	On a visit to Burnout's cousin Haywire down at a farm, Charge rescues a trapped grasshopper named Bouncer, who in turn saves him from Mousetrap, the very short-tempered cat.	21 December 2000
12	Boris	Boris, the Pipistrelle Bat rests inside the lamp. As the Roons make a daytime attack, Boris scares them all away.	21 December 2000
13	Decoy	The Roons kidnap Brigadier Big Beam. Using a diversion and the Roons' decoy, Livewire and Dustywugg rescue Big Beam.	8 January 2001
14	And That's Magic	Captain Brightlight is practicing magic tricks. He and Burnout get caught by Roons. Livewire becomes a magician to help rescue them.	15 January 2001
15	Pinspot	Spotlight has to look after her niece's child. When she falls asleep Baby Pinspot goes exploring and turns off all the street lamps.	22 January 2001
16	Cyber Lampy	Brigadier Big Beam wants to update HO32 with a Cyber Lampy but it goes rogue and tries to take over HO32.	29 January 2001
17	Dick Static	Charge dreams of being a detective named Dick Static After bump on the head he starts acting like the character from his favourite movie.	5 February 2001
18	Roadworks	The Lampies have trouble sleeping due to noisy roadworks trying to take over HO32. However, when Livewire is the only Lampie up and about, chaos ensues!	12 February 2001
19	Return To Geoff	Geoff returns to Earth and helps Burnout clear Roons from a traffic light. He also cleans a jammed up Electric Unit.	19 February 2001
20	Who Dares Whines	A special lamp service unit is captured by the Roons and it's up to Spotlight to save the day.	26 February 2001
21	Chief Beef	Charge wants to get fit and goes to a gym He's trained Chief Beef but Chief Beef isn't as Strong as he seems.	5 March 2001
22	A Dark and Stormy Night	A sudden thunderstorm causes a power cut and Charge, Livewire and Burnout set out to deliver a new fuse.	12 March 2001
23	Striplight	Charge and Contact get lost, and find themselves beneath an airport runway.	19 March 2001
24	Shipmate Charge	Charge and Livewire suddenly find themselves under attack from the Roons when they visit her Uncle Longbeam in his lighthouse.	26 March 2001
25	Tooth of the Matter	Charge breaks a tooth, and has to visit the dentist.	4 October 2001
26	Too Many Cooks	Burnout builds a cooking robot to help Spotlight, but the robot itself hardly improves cooking for the Lampies.	7 October 2001

=== Series 2 ===
#	Title	Summary	Air Date
1	Saved by the Bikey	Spark officially joins the Lampies team as a member of H032 and becomes a Lampie himself.	14 October 2001
2	Neon	A musician named Neon arrives at H032, and Livewire, Dustywugg and Spark get to play backup for him.	21 October 2001
3	The Boy Who Could See The Lampies	PJ, a young boy who can see the Lampies gets friendly with Spark, Livewire and Dustywugg.	4 November 2001
4	Space Walk	Charge, Livewire and Spark meet Geoff the alien yet again, and they get a taste of life in Space.	8 November 2001
5	Boogie Lights	The Roons capture Neon as he is on the way to another of his hugely successful gigs.	11 November 2001
6	Pump It Up	Spark gets a puncture, and he has to make visit to Mr Dynamo's bike shop before it closes.	13 November 2001
7	Charge's Sausage Mole	Charge uncovers a hidden Roon plot involving underground sabotage leading a comedic yet tense excavation mission.	16 November 2001
8	Sacked	The HO32 Lampies Face potential dismissal from Brigadier Big Beam prompting desperate efforts to prove their indispensability The Lampies of HO32 might lose their jobs from Brigadier Big Beam.	18 November 2001
9	The Roon Goo Attack	The Roons plan to stop the Lampies "once and for all", by using their patent "Roon Goo", which can bring about the end of H032 permanently.	2 December 2001
10	HO32 Squadron	Spark drives a remote controlled plane, to rescue Livewire's best friend, Dustywugg, whilst causing chaos in a hardware store.	4 December 2001
11	Bike Gone	Spark earns his own bike. When the roons steal the bike, Spark and Livewire go on a daring mission to recover it.	8 December 2001
12	Moth Magic	Livewire looks after "Dustywing", a moth who burns both her wings "on the lamp head". Meanwhile, the Roons from the sewers attack the Lampies of H032 with a honeycomb.	14 December 2001
13	Football Roonigans	H032 are invited to a football match by a Lampy who works in the floodlights at the football ground.	18 December 2001
14	Lampies, Unplugged	Spark and Livewire foil a fiendish plot to turn all the lights out in H032.	30 December 2001
15	An Open and Shut Case	Spotlight impersonates the Arch Roon's mother to rescue captured agents and Charge from a Roon Stronghold Two secret agents visiting HO32 are captured by Roons with Charge Spotlight saves them by pretending to be the Arch Roon's mother.	3 March 2002
16	The Haunted Lamp	Charge confronts past errors when a supposedly haunted light fixture reveals deeper lampie lore and Roon tricks Charge learns that you can't run from your past mistakes.	10 March 2002
17	Lights on Legs	Spark and Livewire befriend a little frog in the power conduit.	14 March 2002
18	A House Call	Spark and Livewire meet some very dull house-Lampies.	27 March 2002
19	The Vacation	Geoff the alien takes Spark and Livewire to the holiday planet of Triluria.	30 March 2002
20	Watching Over Lois	the crew guards a young girl Named Lois from nocturnal Roon threats highlighting protective themes.	4 April 2002
21	Red Light at Night	The Roons topple the H032 lamp post. The Lampies try to find a way out before the lamp is crushed at the dump.	9 April 2002
22	The Good Roon	The Arch Roon an enemy of the Lampies plans to iniltrate HO32 by pretending to have turned over a new leaf.	9 April 2002
23	All That Glitters	The Lampies help a leprechaun who has had his crook of gold stolen by the Roons.	12 April 2002
24	A Day at the Movies	Spark takes Livewire to meet two Lampies who work in a cinema, only for him to be bored stiff by some home movies.	14 April 2002
25	A Roon Alert	During a nationwide blackout the HO32 crew endures 48 hours of relentless Roon assaults to restore power there's power outage across the country the HO32 crew must survive 48 hour of a total Roon Attack.	16 April 2002
26	Bright Light In Love	Captain Bright Light is captured by the Roons when he goes to visit a female Lampie he fell for whilst on a lamp-commanders training course.	19 July 2002

== Development ==
The series was created by David Bonner in conjunction with Uli Meyer Animation Studios, with music by Mcasso Music.

The series ended production abruptly before the second season was completed due to financial issues, which caused the creative and business drive to malfunction.

In 2003, The IP was bought from the receiver by the chairman of Darlington Football Club and businessman, George Houghton.

== Reception ==
TV distribution rights for Series One were sold into 33 countries."International Songwriting Competition Results". 2006. When series one was broadcast in 2001 it regularly achieved over 40% of target viewing audience. This figure reached over 50% during 2002. Series two of The Lampies was completed in March 2002 and generated similar audience figures with prime slots on BBC 1 and 2.

== Releases ==
HIT Entertainment released a single UK-only VHS tape release of the programme entitled "Captain Who and Other Stories" in 2001. The Lampies Plush Toys Including Livewire Dustywugg Roon & Charge was Launched October 2001 The series has seen two DVD releases that were intended to relaunch the series for a new generation after the sale of the series to LP Productions. The first release, "Switch Onto the Lampies" was released on 7 April 2008, where £2 from the sale of the DVD went towards the Save the Children protection work. The second, "A Bit of a Jam and Other Stories", was released on 19 May 2008 and contains the first half of the first series.
