= The Sunday Hour =

- Other names: Sunday Half Hour (1940–2013)
- Genre: Religious broadcasting
- Running time: 60 mins (30 mins until 2013)
- Country of origin: United Kingdom
- Language: English
- Home station: BBC Light Programme (1945–1967); BBC Radio 2 (1967–2018)
- Hosted by: Roger Royle (1990–2007); Brian D'Arcy (2007–12); Diane-Louise Jordan (2012–17); Kate Bottley (2017–18)
- Original release: 14 July 1940 – 28 January 2018
- Website: www.bbc.co.uk/programmes/b006wqyr

The Sunday Hour was a long-standing show broadcast on the BBC Light Programme and then BBC Radio 2 in the United Kingdom for almost 78 years between 14 July 1940 and 28 January 2018.

For most of its life it occupied a Sunday evening slot as Sunday Half Hour, latterly between 8:30 pm and 9:00 pm but in 2013 it moved to a Sunday morning slot between 6:00 am and 7:00 am. It broadcast Christian hymns and prayer, and was one of only two remaining Christian-based shows on Radio 2, the other being Good Morning Sunday.

For its first fifty years, many presenters took part, and the entire show was hosted by a different church each week. From September 1990, the format changed so that the show was presented by a regular presenter from the studio, with recordings of hymns, some sung by a "featured choir", inserted between the discussion, prayers and dedications. Each week the show was centred on a specific theme: an event in the Church calendar, a passage of the Bible, or a more general area such as the family or the importance of carers. The longest-serving of the regular presenters was Roger Royle, an Anglican priest, who presented the show between September 1990 and April 2007. Brian D'Arcy, a Passionist priest from Northern Ireland, took over as the presenter in April 2007. Diane-Louise Jordan was the next presenter, replacing Father Brian in February 2012. Jordan announced she was leaving in July 2017. The show's final presenter was the Rev. Kate Bottley.

From 20 January 2013, the show was extended to an hour and moved to a new slot from 6:00 am to 7:00 am on Sunday mornings. The programme's name was changed to The Sunday Hour. Singer Michael Ball took over the Sunday evening slot with a new two-hour show.

The show was axed and broadcast its final show on 28 January 2018 after 78 years in favour of a brand new format for Radio 2's Sunday breakfast programme, Good Morning Sunday, starting 4 February.

== Presenters ==
- 1940–1990: Various
- 1990–2007: Roger Royle
- 2007–2012: Brian D'Arcy
- 2012–2017: Diane-Louise Jordan
- 2017–2018: Kate Bottley
