= Dennis and Gnasher (1996 TV series) =

1996 British animated television series

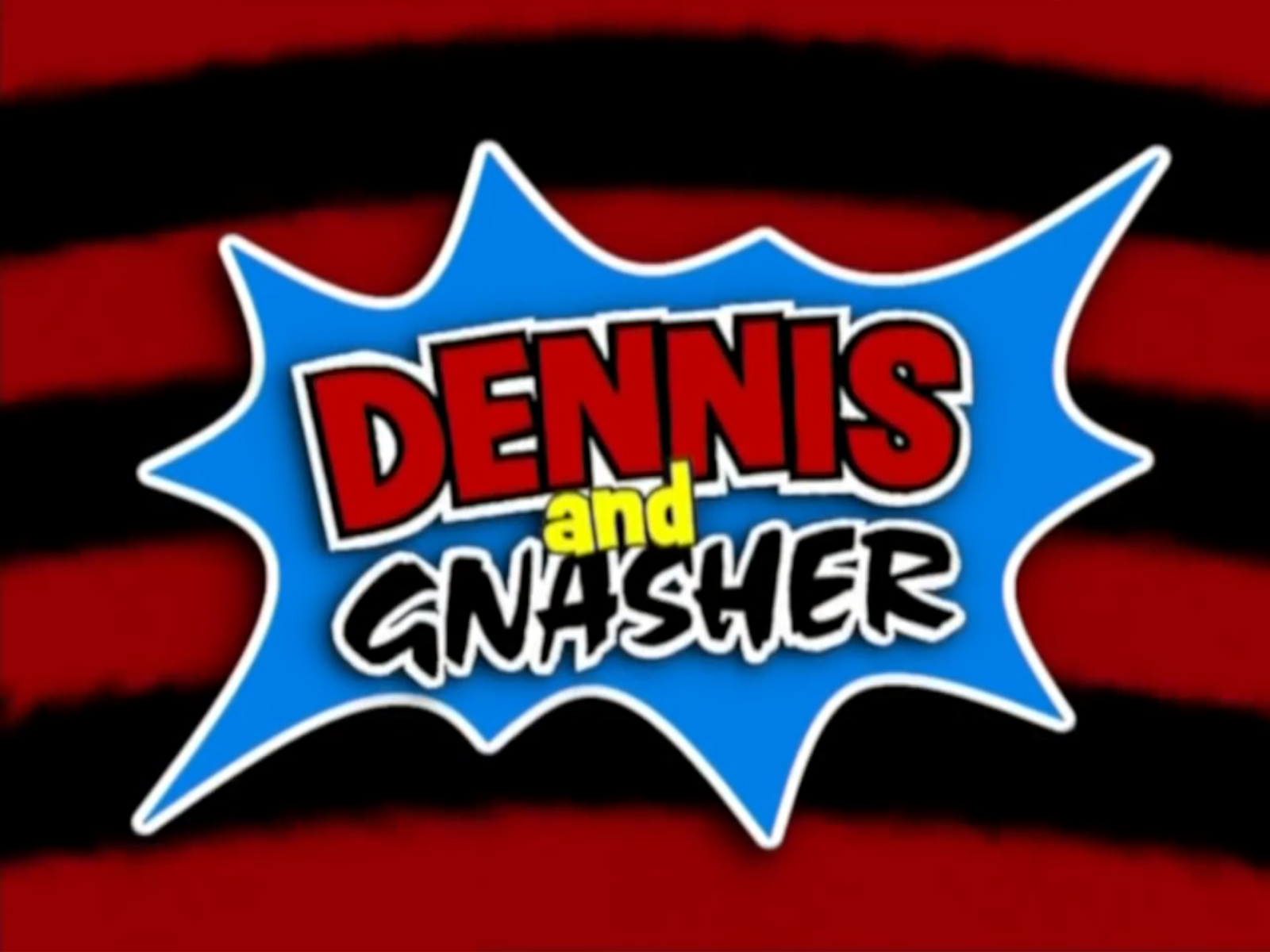
- Also known as: Dennis the Menace
- Genre: Animated; Comedy
- Based on: Characters from The Beano comics
- Written by: Tony Collingwood; Chris Trengove; Jimmy Hibbert; David Freedman; Alan Gilbey
- Directed by: Tony Collingwood
- Voices of: Richard Pearce; Kerry Shale; John Baddeley; Eve Karpf; Sally Grace; Jill Lidstone; Gary Martin; Judy Bennett; Colin McFarlane
- Theme music composer: Roger Jackson
- Composer: Andrew Dimitroff
- Country of origin: United Kingdom
- Original language: English
- No. of series: 2
- No. of episodes: 26

Production
- Producer: Christopher O'Hare
- Running time: 25 minutes
- Production companies: Collingwood O'Hare Productions; D.C. Thomson & Co.

Original release
- Network: BBC One (CBBC); TCC (Season 1); Fox Kids UK (Season 2)
- Release: 2 April 1996 – 7 May 1998

Related
- Dennis the Menace and Gnasher (2009–2013); Dennis & Gnasher: Unleashed! (2017–2021); The Beano's Dennis the Menace and Gnasher Show (1990); The Beano Video (1993); The Beano Videostars (1994)

Dennis and Gnasher (or Dennis the Menace and Dennis the Menace and Gnasher) is a British animated television series based on characters from The Beano comic, which was broadcast on BBC from 2 April 1996 until 7 May 1998. Reruns aired on CBBC until January 2009. The series was produced by Collingwood O'Hare Productions and DC Thomson in association with BBC Television, alongside Flextech and PolyGram Video for the first season only. It was distributed by HIT Entertainment worldwide and was directed and largely written by Tony Collingwood.

== Production ==
=== Development ===
Following his work on Captain Zed and the Zee Zone and Oscar's Orchestra, Tony Collingwood was invited by Peter Orton of HIT Entertainment and DC Thomson to pitch for an animated adaptation of Dennis the Menace and Gnasher. Having grown up reading comics such as The Beano, The Dandy, and The Topper, Collingwood wrote a pilot script, "Hair Today, Gone Tomorrow", which established the series' format. The plot, in which Dennis tries to avoid a haircut, was inspired by Collingwood's childhood memories of his father's barber, named "Slasher" Brown. Instead of producing a test pilot, Collingwood's studio Collingwood O'Hare Productions moved directly into full production, beginning a new episode each week on an overlapping 20-week production cycle.

According to Collingwood, adapting the comic strips into 22-minute episodes required restructuring the storytelling into a three-act format. Collingwood framed Dennis as a reactor to external situations rather than a bully instigating mischief unprovoked, and removed the traditional comic ending in which he is beaten with a slipper by his father, due to changing attitudes towards corporal punishment against children. The scripts also adopted a child's perspective of the adult world, such as Dennis's parents being known solely as "Mum" and "Dad", and frequently utilized in-universe television news broadcasts to deliver rapid exposition and maintain fast pacing. Collingwood created the characters Sergeant Slipper and the Colonel as adult foils for Dennis, both of whom would later be added to the comic strip. He also changed Walter the Softy from a helpless victim of Dennis' mischief into a wealthy, snobbish, and scheming intellectual nemesis, and created his girlfriend Matilda as a replacement for Bertie Blenkinsop and Spotty Perkins to give Walter a conversational foil and balance the predominantly male cast. DC Thomson executive Walter Ferner remained closely involved throughout development.

=== Casting ===
Casting involved a large audition call overseen alongside DC Thomson. Finding the voice of Dennis proved the most difficult challenge due to differing regional expectations across the UK, before Richard Pearce was selected. Conversely, Collingwood specifically sought out John Baddeley to voice Dennis' Dad and the Colonel and Eve Karpf to voice Dennis' Mum after working with them on Oscar's Orchestra, while Colin McFarlane was cast as Sergeant Slipper following auditions.

=== Animation ===
For the first series, character and background designs were led by Trevor Ricketts, and traditional cel animation was outsourced to Hong Ying Animation and Beijing Golden Panda Animation Company in China. To translate Dennis's spiky hair without making it appear inconsistent, the animators numbered each spike and kept their silhouette fixed regardless of head rotation, a technique inspired by Mickey Mouse's ears. Collingwood noted that the series was developed completely independently of The Beano Video and The Beano Videostars.

Between the first and second series, Collingwood's studio relocated from Waterloo to a bespoke facility in Acton. For Series 2, the animation team switched from cel animation to digital ink-and-paint, where pencil drawings and painted backgrounds were scanned into computers and coloured digitally. Designer Andrea Tran slightly simplified the character models to improve animation consistency and conform to the new digital colour palettes.

== Characters ==
=== Main ===
- Dennis (voiced by Richard Pearce) is the main character, a troublemaker and mischievous young boy. While most of it is for fun, his mischief can sometimes cause serious problems, or even help others. Dennis' antics have caused him to gain multiple enemies including his next-door neighbour Walter, the Colonel, and Sergeant Slipper. Dennis has saved the world on one occasion and appeared on Blue Peter after winning an art competition ("The Competition"). One of his favourite TV shows is "Nick Kelly" (a character who featured in another DC Thomson comic).
- Gnasher (voiced by Kerry Shale) is Dennis's pet dog, an Abyssinian wire-haired tripe hound. He is Dennis's "partner in crime". Twenty-four hours a day, seven days a week together they are the proverbial "two peas in a pod". When he's not by Dennis's side, like during school hours (though he does follow Dennis to school in the mornings), Gnasher will have taken up his vigil, hiding in the front garden, ready and waiting to ambush the postman as he attempts to deliver the mail on Gnasher's watch. Gnasher's family still lives on the isle of Abyssinia, as revealed in "The Trial", when a company had accused Gnasher of being a rat. Gnasher possesses a set of teeth that are capable of chewing through almost anything, hence his name. His favourite food is bones, and his favourite dog toy is his squeaky bone. In "Summer Holiday", Gnasher went by the alias of "Norman" – in order to pass himself off as a baby to help the family find lodgings at a hotel that forbids pets. In "Special Agent Dennis", it is revealed that Dennis feeds Gnasher his homework rather than actually do the homework.
- Dennis' Dad (voiced by John Baddeley) is under a lot of stress due to Dennis' mischief; he often tries to discipline his son, with few results, and is forced to resort to extreme measures at times. He works in an office.
- Dennis' Mum (voiced by Eve Karpf) seems to be able to cope more with Dennis' behaviour and on equal terms, Dennis listens to her when she reprimands him. At times, she can be rather oblivious to events around her and silly, using household objects to help her when she takes driving lessons ("Menace Power").
- Dennis's Granny, Gertrude (voiced by Sally Grace) Although she is eight decades old, Dennis's Granny is still very young at heart. Dennis loves his Granny, defends her when another speaks ill of her ("Dennis and the Beanstalk"), and will come to her for advice in times of need ("The Secret Diary"). In her youth, Dennis's Granny was every bit the Menace towards anything like a peaceful society in Beanotown that her grandson is today, as revealed in "The Secret Diary", and in her day there was a police officer, Sgt. Boot, who was the "Sgt. Slipper" to her "Dennis". According to information from the Beano comic, she is the mother of Dennis's Dad; in "The Secret Diary", when Dennis's Dad mentions more than once how well-behaved he was to his parents, he may have been referring particularly to his father because Dennis's Granny favours her grandson, Dennis, who takes after her. In "The Secret Diary", she was depicted as having black hair, like her son and grandson, but in "Gorilla Warfare", she was seen in a flashback with blond hair (so possibly she dyed it). She rides a motorcycle and eats pizza with "everything on them". She is perhaps the only adult, as mentioned by Dennis's Dad, "insane enough" to provide Dennis with any adult supervision and survive intact; she will even willingly come back for more of the fun and mayhem.
- Curly (voiced by Jill Lidstone) is Dennis's best friend and fellow Menace. He is the loyal friend that will stand up for Dennis no matter what and can be considered his second-in-command.
- Kevin "Pie-Face" (voiced by Gary Martin) is Dennis' other best friend and fellow Menace. He is portrayed as being dim-witted and at times cowardly, as well as being a fan of pies (hence his nickname).
- Walter the Softy (voiced by Judy Bennett) is Dennis' next-door neighbour, rival and major enemy. He is always exasperated with Dennis' mischief and often tries to come up with ideas to humiliate and outshine him. But he is never successful as his plans tend to backfire.
- Matilda (voiced by Eve Karpf) is Walter's best friend and girlfriend, often seen with him and swooning over him. Matilda will also give Walter cucumber sandwiches with the crust cut off on their picnics. Her name and Walter's are a pun on the song "Waltzing Matilda".
- Sergeant Slipper (voiced by Colin McFarlane) is a local policeman and another enemy of Dennis, usually being the first one to deal with Dennis' antics outside his house, and often is seen with the Colonel. He is a bit clumsy at times and often overreacts to things. Seeing as there have been occasions where he and Dennis have encountered a common enemy, however, there have also been times when he proves himself to be extremely responsible, adept (enough to both take on the role of judge and pilot a police aircraft in "The Trial") and effective at his job. Designer Trevor Rickett created Slipper's name in reference to the comic's discontinued tradition of Dennis' Dad beating Dennis with a slipper.
- The Colonel (Godfrey; voiced by John Baddeley) is a neighbour of Dennis' family who lives across the road. He is a stereotypical military veteran who is never seen outside of his military uniform. His camouflage-painted house resembles a military bunker, complete with sandbagged walls, and he even has a tank parked in his front garden. Likely, he is still in active (albeit limited) service, as he is occasionally seen conducting meetings at the nearby military base and is sometimes accompanied by a platoon of soldiers to tackle an opponent (usually Dennis). The Colonel often recalls memorable battles in his life and is considered an enemy of sorts by Dennis. However, there are occasions when the both of them join forces against a common enemy, such as in the episode "The Trial", during which they, along with Sergeant Slipper and the Colonel's cousin Hugo, set off to find Gnasher (after the Colonel had made a false accusation against him). Collingwood based the Colonel on an ill-tempered neighbour from his childhood in Hull, who disliked children playing in the street. Trevor Ricketts designed the character's house and walls.
- Foo Foo is Walter's pet poodle and Gnasher's rival. She has been seen in a few episodes with Walter holding her while he's scolding Dennis. She tries to beat Gnasher at his own game but fails. Even though she does not appear as often as her master, Foo Foo is a minor antagonist.

=== Minor and guests ===
- Mrs. Pie Face, Kevin Pie Face's Mum (voiced by Jill Lidstone)
- Mr. Pie Face, Kevin Pie Face's Dad (voiced by Gary Martin)
- The Postman (voiced by John Baddeley) Like in the comic, the Postman is mostly harassed by Gnasher whenever he tries to deliver the mail to Dennis' House.
- Rasher is Dennis' pet pig that made a cameo in the episode "Dennis and the Beanstalk".
- Sidney is Dennis' spider based on the comic book spider Dasher that with his web saved the day. Seen in "Secret Agent Dennis".
- Walter's Dad (voiced by Gary Martin)
- School Headmaster (voiced by Colin McFarlane)
- Flossy Muggins (voiced by Sally Grace) is a wacky inventor who helped Dennis build some ingenious inventions. Seen in "Revenge of the Robot".
- Dirk Cool (voiced by Gary Martin) is a secret agent and a master of disguise. Seen in "Special Agent Dennis".
- Vilhemina Slop Bucket (voiced by Mollie Sugden) is a crazed, villainous dinner lady who seeks world domination which includes making everyone eat her revolting leftover school dinners. Seen in "Secret Agent Dennis".
- Aunt Beryl is Gran's sister.
- Hugo (voiced by Simon Callow) is the Colonel's adventurer cousin who helped Dennis and the others save Gnasher and other Abyssinian tripe hounds from the rat catchers. Seen in "The Trial".
- Mr Smiley (voiced by Derek Nimmo) is a nutty psychiatrist, who tried Dennis-like practical jokes on the parents during his course on "How to Understand Children", but couldn't get the better of Dennis even though the parents thought he was worse than him. Seen in "Dennis and the Grown-Ups".
- Slasher Brown (voiced by Denis Quilley) is Walter's twisted uncle, who runs the barbershop. Seen in "Hair Today, Gone Tomorrow" as the main antagonist.
- Reg Trademark (voiced by John Baddeley) is an eccentric inventor who makes insane and useless gadgets. He builds a shopping mall and uses subliminal messages to make the customers buy his on sale gadgets. Seen in "Malled".
- Bertie Blenkinsop is a fellow softy and friend of Walter. Seen in "Snowbound".
- Spotty Perkins is a fellow softy and friend of Walter. Seen in "Snowbound".
- Captain Trout (voiced by Billy Connolly) is a sailor who enlists Dennis and the gang as the crew aboard his ship, the S.S. Rustbucket. Despite managing to capture the boys' interest when he relates to them how he lost his father, Captain Prefab to a whale known as Dopey Mick (a parody of Moby Dick) Captain Trout is essentially a strict, no-nonsense person – which results in Dennis very quickly losing all respect for him when he discovers this! However, he is grateful to the gang for their role in helping him be reunited with his father, and when they help him escape from the whale. Both captains appear in "Dennis Ahoy!". Captain Prefab later appears in a non-speaking cameo role in "Summer Holiday".

== Episodes ==
During the series' credits, the guest stars were always at the top before the regular cast.

=== Series 1 (1996) ===
This series is animated in cel animation.

#	Title	Date	Guest Actor(s)	Summary
1	"Hair Today, Gone Tomorrow"	2 April 1996	Denis Quilley	Dennis is forced by his parents to go for a haircut at Slasher Brown's barbershop, and ends up being chased by the World Federation of Barbers.
2	"The Day They Took Gnasher Away"	9 April 1996	Hugh Laurie	When the Dog Training School promises Dennis's father that they can turn Gnasher into a perfect pooch, Dennis and the gang go on an undercover mission to rescue him, and discover the school is not what it seems...
3	"Bathnight Club"	16 April 1996	N/A	It's a race against time! Dad's determined to get Dennis in the bath, but the Ministry of Defence wants Dennis left unwashed, for his smelly socks are their latest secret weapon!
4	"Dennis Ahoy!"	23 April 1996	Billy Connolly	When Dennis and the gang volunteer to do a days work on the SS Rustbucket on a race around the Cape of Good Hope, they find themselves swallowed alive by "Dopey Mick", the daftest whale of the 7 seas.
5	"Revenge of the Robot"	30 April 1996	N/A	When the chief of the police fires Slipper for not being able to stop Dennis's trouble-making about town, it looks like it will be the end for Dennis's menacing when the post of Sergeant is replaced by a seemingly unbeatable robot! Has Dennis met his match, or will his newfound friend, the loopy female inventor Flossy save the day?
6	"Wanted!"	7 May 1996	Leslie Phillips	When two wanted criminals see Dennis's amazing ways of making mischief, they trick him into doing his biggest blow yet...robbing the Beanotown bank!
7	"Dennis and the Beanstalk"	14 May 1996	N/A	When Gnasher is forced to stay in bed due to a toothache, Dennis cheers him up by telling him a story, but not just any old story...why just read from a book when you can mix them up and make your own special version? We see Dennis & Gnasher going on an adventure in a mystical land, meeting their friends and enemies on the way.....
8	"Unidentified Funny Object"	21 May 1996	Tim Brooke-Taylor, Willie Rushton	When aliens with the ability to disguise themselves as anything arrive on earth disguised as television sets and seeking help, Dennis and Gnasher are keen to help out, on the understanding that they can help him too, by using their disguises for menacing! NOTE: Willie Rushton died 7 months after this episode originally aired on Children's BBC, making this one of his last roles.
9	"Special Agent Dennis"	28 May 1996	Jonathan Kydd, Mollie Sugden	Dennis's dad is too sick to come to work, so Dennis hands in a sick note to find out what Dad's work life is like...only due to a mix-up Dennis & Gnasher find themselves instead at the Secret Agency next door where they are mistaken for Derek Cool, a secret agent who is a master of disguise dressed as a 10-year-old boy and his dog. Next thing the duo know, they are being fired off in a space pod on a mission to stop a crazy dinner lady called Vilhemina Slopbucket turn the whole world into 10-year-olds unless they eat her rotten dinners! Can Dennis and Gnasher save the day?
10	"Dennis and the Grown-Ups"	4 June 1996	Derek Nimmo	After some trouble with Dennis, Mum and Dad join an adult education class to understand children, only to understand the tutor is a bit loopy! Meanwhile, Dennis runs his own class among his friends titled "How to Understand Grown-ups".
11	"The Secret Diary"	25 June 1996	Greg Proops	Hiding from the wrath of Dad after a chaotic morning (aided by Granny), Dennis comes across what he thinks is his Dad's diary, and realises that in his youth he was far from the respectable young man he claimed to be. Soon, the diary entries make Dad a reluctant celebrity, and with a Hollywood film director making a film based on the book, Dennis discovers that his antics are no longer seen as threatening.
12	"Gorilla Warfare"	2 July 1996	N/A	When the Colonel organises an outward bound weekend in the woods, Dennis and Gnasher decide to tag along and cause mayhem for a laugh, but things are not longer a joke when they learn that Genghis Kong, an escaped circus gorilla, is on the loose in the woods and has somehow taken an interest to Dennis's granny.
13	"The Day TV was Banned"	9 July 1996	Ken Dodd	Eccentric millionaire Sir Fitz-Patrick Flush promises to give a million-pound cheque to the citizens of Beanotown if they can live without television for a whole week. Unfortunately, this doesn't go down well with Dennis and pal's plans to watch the week-long marathon of their favourite show "Nick Kelly".

=== Series 2 (1998) ===
For this series, the animation team switched from traditional cel animation to digital ink-and-paint, making the motions appear much smoother.

#	Title	Date	Guest Actor(s)	Summary
14	"The Competition!"	13 February 1998	Katy Hill, Stuart Miles	Humiliated by Walter during a hectic game of tag (which soon cumulates into a national frenzy when adults begin to get tagged), Dennis decides to compete against him in a Blue Peter painting competition, with a "little help" from a certain four-legged friend...
15	"Summer Holiday"	20 February 1998	Prunella Scales	Dad is incredibly determined that the Menace family holiday will be incident-free, but Dennis' usual mayhem, an animal-hating guest-house owner, and a suspected burglary back home do very little effort to liven up his spirits...
16	"Menace Power"	27 February 1998	N/A	When Dennis beats Walter in a racing car competition, The Colonel is determined to find what made his engine-free vehicle tick, whilst Mum prepares herself for a driving test with the help from Dad, a runaway dodgem car, and Gnasher's favourite squeaky bone...
17	"Dennisaurus Rex"	6 March 1998	N/A	The discovery of a large stone-age mural in the Menaces' front garden causes Dennis to daydream about what it would be like to live in prehistoric times... and to somehow witness the creation of the wheel.
18	"Adventures in Dennis Sitting"	13 March 1998	N/A	Dennis's plans to create chaos at the school parents' evening are seemingly thwarted when his parents arrange The Colonel to babysit for them and tell-tale Walter comes to stay for the night, but when a top-secret weapon is aimed at the school, only Dennis knows how to save the day...
19	"Haunted House"	20 March 1998	Hinge and Bracket	Dad's ghastly aunts return from their 20-year long holiday expedition ten years earlier than expected and quickly prove themselves to be a big match for Dennis. But when his attempts to scare them out of the house only leads to an extended stay, he's determined to discover the truth about these unwanted visitors.
20	"Oil Strike!"	27 March 1998	Bernard Cribbins	The Menace family are swindled by ruthless tycoon Clint Katzenberger, who tries to root out an oil field beneath their house. Desperate to get their home back, Dennis turns to Katzenberger's sworn enemies, The Green and Friendly Pressure Group, for help, but is that thick black liquid really oil?
21	"Mauled"	3 April 1998	N/A	A new Mega Mall suddenly opens in Beanotown, but Dennis and Gnasher quickly realise something's not right when all the smaller shops in Beanotown close down and everyone begins acting strangely. But when Dennis falls under the Mega Mall's spell, Gnasher is left up to save the day.
22	"The Trial"	9 April 1998	Simon Callow, Eric Meyers	Gnasher finds himself hunted down by sinister rat catchers when the Colonel's "adventurer" cousin Hugo claims he is really a dangerous "super-rat". A heated court trial ensues to prove Gnasher's canine ancestry, but is Hugo really the world traveller he claims he is?
23	"Journey to the Centre of the Bed"	16 April 1998	N/A	Dennis's search for the existence of the Tooth Fairy takes him (along with Gnasher and Pie-Face) into the farthest reaches of his mattress, where he ends up in a war zone between the Fairy Freedom Fighters, a bunch of goblins, and their familiar-looking ruler...
24	"Skull & Crossbones"	23 April 1998	Brian Blessed	Mum's new job at the art gallery is threatened when a group of scurvy dogs steal the gallery's main attraction as a new figurehead for their ship. It's up to Dennis and his crew to battle the pirates and return the stolen statue.
25	"Snowbound"	30 April 1998	N/A	Dennis competes in a race against Walter to become school prefect, and is determined to make it to the building early for once... despite the fact everyone has had the day off due to a snow blizzard. Soon, things take a turn for the abominable when a furry giant begins following them...
26	"Monster Menace"	7 May 1998	Jimmy Hibbert	The series finale. Expecting a "Model Space Racer Jet Set Kit", Dennis and Gnasher instead receive Jacques, a hulking, information-guzzling fellow who becomes a huge hit with the school and wins the heart of Matilda. However, not everyone in Beanotown takes an instant liking to Dennis' new monstrous mate...

== Revival series ==
A new television series, named Dennis the Menace and Gnasher, was produced and aired in 2009. The new series features the return of Dennis, Gnasher, Mum, Dad, Curly and Pie-Face, and also features the introduction of Dennis' little sister Bea. The production shots also showed Dennis' treehouse with a more menacing design. Screenshots and an episode can be found at the production company Red Kite Animation's website.

The show used to be shown at 4.00 pm from Monday-Friday on CBBC.

== Release ==
=== Broadcast ===
The series, originally named Dennis the Menace, initially aired on BBC One and CBBC, with the latter channel airing it until 2009 when it was replaced with Dennis the Menace and Gnasher. It also later started airing on TCC and Fox Kids. The series concluded after two 13-episode seasons, as Collingwood felt that it had run its course.

In the US, the series was renamed Dennis and Gnasher to avoid confusion with Hank Ketcham's comic strip Dennis the Menace. It aired on PBS Kids between 2001 and 2004, and was also a launch programme for PBS Kids Sprout's on-demand platform alongside other HIT Entertainment-distributed programmes.

Internationally, it aired on RTL 7 in Poland, NCRV and NPO Zappelin in the Netherlands, Super RTL in Germany, Italia 1 in Italy, and SBT in Brazil.

=== Home media ===
Series 1 was originally released on VHS through Polygram Video in 1996 and 1997. Both volumes contained two episodes which made up the first four episodes of the series. They were eventually released on DVD by Universal Pictures Video. An additional VHS release (Dennis the Menace: Bumper Video Special) also released by Polygram Video contained 3 episodes ("Wanted!", "The Day TV was Banned", "The Secret Diary") and was released in 1997.

Series 2 was released on VHS by DC Thomson. In 2004, Delta Leisure released three DVDs of the series, containing all thirteen episodes on them. They were later released as a single DVD set entitled "Making Mischief". In February 2011, Delta Leisure released a four-disc boxset containing the three previously released DVDs, as well as The Beano Allstars.

On 22 August 2011, Delta Leisure released an eight-disc boxset containing all twenty-six episodes of the series alongside The Beano Video and The Beano Videostars entitled "Special Agent Dennis & 25 More Crazy Adventures!". The release was made to coincide with the character's sixtieth anniversary.

== Ratings (CBBC Channel) ==
Saturday 22 June 2002 – 40,000 (3rd most watched on CBBC that week)
Sunday 23 June 2002 – 30,000 (5th most watched on CBBC that week)
