= Eve Karpf =

British actress (born 1947)

- Born: Eve Josef Karpf; 2 August 1947 (age 79); London, England
- Other name: Eve Karp
- Education: Bristol Old Vic Theatre School
- Alma mater: University of Bristol
- Occupations: Actress, voice actress
- Years active: 1973–present
- Children: Mark Lowen (son)
- Mother: Natalia Karp
- Relatives: Anne Karpf (sister)

Eve Karpf (born 2 August 1947) is a British actress. Among her roles she was the voice of Weed for the 2001 Bill and Ben reboot.

== Early life ==
Karpf was born on 2 August 1947 in London. Her mother is the Polish concert pianist Natalia Karp née Weissman (1911-2007), a Jewish refugee from the Nazis and Holocaust survivor. She was trained at Bristol Old Vic Theatre School. She then attended University of Bristol to study drama and theatre, graduating with a BA in Drama and Theatre Studies.

== Career ==
She was also the voice of Dennis's Mum and Matilda in the 1996 Dennis and Gnasher television series, Mrs. Bird in The Adventures of Paddington Bear, The Voice in the first series of Trapped! and Grandma in The Large Family. Karpf also featured in several audiobooks, among them A Creepy Company who was praised as being "a marvelous performer whose storytelling talents keep the listener spellbound". She is known for being the voice of the Ferrero Rocher commercial line, "Monsieur, with these Rocher, you're really spoiling us."

She has voiced numerous roles in video games from various franchises based on other media, including James Bond and Star Wars. Her credits include Minerva McGonagall in the Harry Potter video games, including Philosopher's Stone (released in the US as Sorcerer's Stone), Chamber of Secrets, Prisoner of Azkaban, Order of the Phoenix, Half-Blood Prince and Deathly Hallows – Part 2. She also did the voice over for the role of Monica, the mother of St. Augustine in the movie Restless Heart (Ignatius Press), Kristina Boaz in the 2003 video game Tomb Raider: The Angel of Darkness, the cat Alvina in 2011 video game Dark Souls and the elf Fiona and Divine Justinia V in the 2014 video game Dragon Age: Inquisition. She is also represented by Hobson's International until 2009. Karpf also did the additional voices in the 2015 film Minions.

== Personal life ==
Eve's son Mark Lowen is the BBC News Southern Europe correspondent and her sister Anne Karpf is a journalist.

== Filmography ==
=== Television series ===
Year	Title	Role	Notes
1974	Horizon	Woman	Episode: The Lysenko Affair
1974	Thriller	Miss Compton	Episode: Who Killed Lamb?
1975	Dixon of Dock Green	Cara	Episode: It's a Gift
1978	Come Back, Lucy	Mademoiselle	Episode: 2, 3 & 5
1978	Return of the Saint	Desk Clerk	Episode: The Nightmare Man
1981	Codename Icarus	Catherine Elton	Episode: 3 & 4
1982	On The Line	Marion Bateman	Episode: 3 & 5
1988	Executive Stress	German Operator	Episode: One
1988	The Bill	Doctor	Episode: Runaround
1991	French Fields	Madame Dax	Episode: Darling Daughters
1995	Resort to Murder	Mrs. Lipinski	Episode: 2
1998	Vincent and Doug Season 5	Sue	Episode: Meet Sue / The Batman Bulldog
1999	Vincent and Doug Season 6	Sue	Episode: Vincent the Vampire Slayer
1999	Dog and Duck	Mother / Teacher / Animals	Voices
2000	Vincent and Doug Season 7	Sue	Episode: Wild Wild West Showdown
2000	Vincent and Doug: Unseen Bits	Sue	Episode: Pesky Pets
2000	Home Sweet Home	Eve	TV movie
2001	Vincent and Doug Season 8	Sue	Episode: Doug Goes Missing
2001	Bill and Ben	Weed / Pry / Scamper	Episode: Go Fly a Kite
2001	Vincent and Doug: Unseen Bits	Sue	Episode: Slow Motion
2002	Vincent and Doug Season 9	Sue	Episode: Tarzan's Revenge
2003	Vincent and Doug Season 10	Sue	Episode: We're not Cancelled
2005	The Shape of the Future	Eve Karpf	TV movie
2006	Holby City	Shirley Golding	Episode: Sins of the Father
2007	Trapped!	The Voice	Series 1
2007	War and Peace	Countess Rostova	Mini series
2020	Over Christmas	Oma Hilde	English dub
2021	Anxious People	Anna-Lena	English version

=== Anime series ===
List of dubbing performances in anime series
Year	Title	Role	Notes
1992	Fairy Dick	Shopkeeper / Lady / Newscaster	English version

=== Animation ===
List of voice performances in animation
Year	Title	Role(s)	Notes
1995	Oscar's Orchestra	Sylvia the Flute	Episode: Bach to the Future
1996	Dennis and Gnasher	Dennis's mum / Mabel / Matilda	Series Regular
1996	Budgie the Little Helicopter	Civilians / Grans / Madame	Episode: Double Trouble
1997	The Adventures of Paddington Bear	Mrs. Bird	Episode: A Visit to the Hospital
1998	Pablo the Little Red Fox	Madame Owl / Various	52 episodes
1998	The Adventures of Paddington Bear Season 2	Mrs. Bird	Episode: A Day to Remember
1998	Calling All Toddlers		
1999	Calling All Toddlers	Old Woman	Paddington Goes Underground
2000	The Adventures of Paddington Bear Season 3	Mrs. Bird	Episode: Anchors Away
2001	The Lampies	Alien Grans	Episode: Captain Who?
2002	Animated Tales of the World	Mother / Cowherd / Baby	Episode: A Story from Taiwan: Aunt Tiger
2002	Calling All Toddlers 2	Weed / Scamper / Pry	Voice
2003	Sergeant Stripes Season 1	Sergeant Parker	Episode: The Key Mystery
2003	Bounty Hamster	Ship lady / Driver	Episode: Fashion Victim
2005	BB3B	Granny / Mama	Episode: Chart Attack
2008	A Fox's Tale	Trixie / Madame Renard / Doris	Voice
2021	Elliott from Earth	Kindly old lady	5 episodes

=== Film ===
List of voice performances in direct-to-video and television films
Year	Title	Role	Notes
1973	A Touch of Class	Miss Ramos	
1974	Who Killed Lamb?	Miss Compton	
1975	Drive Carefully, Darling	Wife	Short
1989	The Star Child	Eva	
1990	Peter in Magicland	Mother Cloud	English dub
1999	Vincent and Doug: The Movie	Sue	Voice
2002	Vincent and Doug 2	Sue	Voice
2002	The Princess and the Pea	Queen Helsa	Voice
2003	Mother Teresa of Calcutta	Virginia	
2005	Beneath Still Waters	Sophie	Spanish and English film
2010	Restless Heart: The Confessions of Saint Augustine	Monica	English version
2015	Minions	Town lady / Old woman	Additional voices

=== Podcast series ===
List of voice performances in podcast
Year	Title	Role(s)	Notes
2012	Doctor Who: The Monthly Adventures	Talbar	Episode: The Shadow Heart
2013	Sherlock Holmes	The Gracious Adelina / Mrs. Chaunt Maclise / Mrs. Hope	Voice
2014	Doctor Who: The Monthly Adventures	Virna	Episode: Tomb Ship
2016	Gallifrey	The Watchmaker	Episode: Enemy Lines
2018	Bernice Summerfield	Shekkina	Episode: Empress of the Drahvins

=== Video games ===
List of voice performances in video games
Year	Title	Role	Notes
1997	The City of Lost Children	Kathy	Additional voices
1998	Vincent and Doug: the Video Game	Sue	PC
1998	Lego Loco	Citizens	PC
1999	Vincent and Doug: The Movie Game	Sue	PC
1999	Tomorrow Never Dies	Paris Carver / Wai Lin	PlayStation 2
2001	Harry Potter and the Philosopher's Stone	Professor Minerva McGonagall / Professor Sprout / Madame Hooch	PlayStation
2002	Vincent and Doug 2	Sue	PC
2002	Harry Potter and the Chamber of Secrets	Professor Minerva McGonagall / Professor Sprout / Madame Roland Hooch / The Fat Lady	PlayStation 2
2003	Primal	Queen Devena / Captain Valeera	PC
2003	Tomb Raider: The Angel of Darkness	Kristina Boaz	PlayStation 2
2004	Dragon Quest VIII	Warrior / Old wizard	Nintendo 3DS
2004	Vincent and Doug 3: James Monroe Returns!	Sue	PC
2004	Fable	Scarlet Robe / Balverine Hunter's Wife / Madame Minzche	PC
2004	Harry Potter and the Prisoner of Azkaban	Minerva McGonagall / The Fat Lady	PlayStation 2
2005	Vincent and Doug Sports!	Sue	PC
2005	MediEvil: Resurrection	Forrest Witch	PlayStation Portable
2005	Fable: The Lost Chapters	Scarlet Robe / Balverine Hunter's Wife / Madame Minzche	Xbox 360
2005	The Curse of the Were-Rabbit	Mrs. Hedges / Betty Blight	PlayStation 2
2006	Vincent and Doug Sports! 2	Sue	PC
2006	Tomb Raider: Legend	Lady Croft	PlayStation 2
2007	Harry Potter and the Order of the Phoenix	Professor Minerva McGonagall	PlayStation 2 / PlayStation 3
2008	Fable II	Jewelry Lady / Noble Lady / Bloodstone Bar Lady	Xbox 360
2008	Age of Conan	Villager / The Wizard / Old women	Xbox 360
2009	Harry Potter and the Half-Blood Prince	Minerva McGonagall	PlayStation 3
2009	Cursed Mountain	Jomo Menmo	Wii
2009	Dragon Age: Origins	Miriam	Xbox 360
2010	Dante's Inferno	Clodia	Xbox 360
2010	Castlevania: Lords of Shadow	Baba Yaga	PlayStation 3
2011	Deathly Hallows – Part 2	Minerva McGonagall	Xbox 360
2011	Dark Souls	Alvina of the Darkroot Wood	Xbox One
2011	Star Wars: The Old Republic	Inquisitor Urinth / Overseer Ragate	PC
2013	Crysis 3	NAX	PC
2014	Fable Anniversary	Scarlet Robe / Balverine Hunter's Wife / Madame Minzche	Xbox 360
2014	Tropico 5	El Presidente	PlayStation 4
2014	Dragon Age: Inquisition	Fiona / Divine Justinia V	PlayStation 4
2016	Star Ocean: Anamnesis	Wizards / Magicians	Additional voices
2017	Horizon Zero Dawn	Lansra	PlayStation 4
2017	Dragon Quest XI: Echoes of an Elusive Age	The Seer / Cetacea / Yggdragon	PC
2017	Divinity: Original Sin II	Villagers / Ladies	PlayStation 4
2018	Dark Souls: Remastered	Alvina of the Darkroot Wood	PlayStation 4
2019	Anno 1800	Lady Margaret Hunt	PlayStation 5
2019	Trine 4: The Nightmare Prince	Aunt Gretchen	Xbox One
2019	Terminator: Resistance	Erin	PlayStation 5
2019	Tropico 6	Construction Lady	Nintendo Switch
2020	Bleeding Edge	Maeve	Xbox One
2020	Serious Sam 4	Nonna	PlayStation 5
2020	Sackboy: A Big Adventure	Mama Monkey	PlayStation 5
2020	Demon's Souls	Filthy Woman / Narrator	PlayStation 5
2021	Yaga	Grandma	PlayStation 4
2022	Xenoblade Chronicles 3	Other	English version
2022	A Plague Tale: Requiem	People / Older woman / Grandmother	PlayStation 5
2023	Atomic Heart	Granny Zina	PlayStation 5
2023	Shadow Gambit: The Cursed Crew	Old Gertrude	PlayStation 5
2023	Alan Wake 2	Mandy May	PlayStation 5
2023	The Talos Principle 2	Neith	PlayStation 5
2023	Warcraft Rumble	Warriors / Wizards	IOS / Android
2024	Lego Loco	Ladies / Civilians	Additional voices
2024	Planet Coaster 2	Nana Betty	PlayStation 5
2025	Tomb Raider IV–VI Remastered	Kristina Boaz	Xbox One / PlayStation 5
2025	Ghost Town	Angela Abbot	PC
2025	Dragon Quest I & II HD-2D Remake	Dragon Queen / The Seer / Cetacea	PlayStation 5
