= Malcolm Brabant =

Freelance journalist

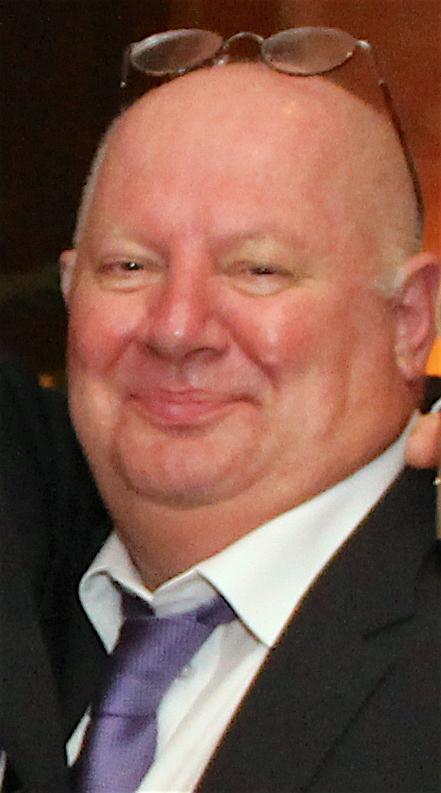
- Brabant in 2016
- Born: Malcolm J. Brabant; 1955 (age 70–71); Willesden, London Borough of Brent, England
- Education: Northgate Grammar School, Ipswich
- Occupation: Freelance journalist
- Years active: 1975–present
- Spouse: Trine Villemann
- Children: Lukas Brabant

Malcolm J. Brabant (born 1955) is a freelance British journalist. He trained with and worked for the BBC for more than 20 years, reporting from various locations. Described as the "King of the Stringers," Brabant has also worked for UNICEF. Brabant is now a PBS NewsHour special correspondent based in Europe; in 2016, NewsHour earned a Peabody Award for his and others' reporting on the 2015–16 European migrant crisis.

== Early life ==
Brabant was born in 1955 in Willesden, in the London borough of Brent.

== Career ==
Brabant started his journalistic career at the Ipswich Press Agency with Terry Lloyd. He began broadcasting at Radio Orwell in Ipswich, and moved on to Independent Radio News in London from 1978 to 1982. His first television job was at About Anglia. He subsequently worked for Central TV in Nottingham, Thames Television and BBC Radio Four's Today programme. In 1989 he went freelance as the BBC's Athens correspondent. Working as a "Stringer" – a journalist paid by the news organisations on a per-piece basis – for 22 years he reported from various overseas territories and on numerous news stories, including Sarajevo, Montserrat, Denmark, Greece, the United States and the Middle East.

In 2008 following a BBC corporation wide review led by Mark Byford, BBC News introduced new money-savings contracts. Previously, BBC News had bought all material from their contract freelance journalists, in whatever form: written; sound recorded; television media; editorial. Under the new contract, it was proposed that the BBC would only buy the required pieces, while restricting contracted freelancers solely to working for BBC News. Brabant led the orchestrated opposition, which resulted in him and other freelance journalists being allowed to sell the non-required pieces to other news organisations. Hence in 2009, after BBC News bought Brabant's written follow-up piece on the Danish cartoon controversy for their website, Brabant sold the visual recording to other news organisations. Other freelance journalists later commented that Brabant had single-handedly saved British freelance journalism.

Brabant also worked for UNICEF, providing bespoke news reports on key issues which the organisation could use to highlight defined issues.

Brabant can currently be seen regularly on PBS NewsHour, where, as a special correspondent, he reports from Europe on the Syrian refugee crisis and other events.

On 27 December 2016, PBS NewsHour broadcast a segment by Brabant titled "Water to Power", in which Brabant appeared to take seriously fantastic claims by Greek inventor Petros Zografos. Hari Sreenivasan introduced the segment by saying, "Imagine a mini power supply in your house or car that made it possible for you to be off the grid. What if that source of energy was totally clean and powered by simple tap water? Well, a Greek scientist claims to have created a machine that converts water into power. As part of our occasional innovation series, special correspondent Malcolm Brabant traveled to the inventor's island home."

Quickly after the broadcast, at the PBS NewsHour page streaming the episode, scores of viewers left comments harshly critical of the segment's journalistic integrity and alleged lack of scientific sophistication. On 28 December 2016, the segment was removed from the "Full Program" streaming page with the explanation, "NOTE: The story about a Greek inventor and clean energy has been removed temporarily while it is being further reviewed by our staff." A full transcript and full streaming segment could still be found elsewhere on the Web.

At the end of the 28 December 2016 episode, Sreenivasan made a statement on the situation, saying, "the NewsHour acknowledges that our reporting of this segment should have been more skeptical….We are examining each step in our process, and we apologize to our audience for the lapses in this report." Further controversy ensued as some commenters accused NewsHour of "censoring" the segment and practicing "blackout tactics" to squelch "divergent science." PBS Ombudsman Michael Getler in a blog titled "How Do You Say 'Oy Vey' in Greek?" said the incident was "painful to describe," and that "what happened last night will undoubtedly provide fodder for those who use the term 'fake news' these days to tarnish a news program that does not engage in such things." Malcolm Brabant has not commented on his role in the story and has neither defended nor disavowed its journalistic integrity.

== Reaction to yellow fever vaccine ==
In 2011, Brabant became seriously ill following a routine inoculation against yellow fever. Asked to report from Ivory Coast by UNICEF, Brabant was administered the yellow fever vaccine Stamaril made by Sanofi Pasteur in April 2011, at the Vaccination Centre East Attica in Pallini, Athens. An adverse reaction led to three psychotic episodes, during which Brabant spent more than three months in the intensive care units of psychiatric hospitals in three countries. He was replaced for a time by the BBC's then-Balkans Correspondent, Mark Lowen, but eventually recovered and resumed his work for PBS.

In 2015 Brabant wrote a book entitled Malcolm is a Little Unwell about his illness and the profound effect it had on his career and family life. The book was made into a documentary film in 2018 and included original footage shot by Brabant and his wife during his psychosis.
