= Come Back, Lucy =

1973 story by Pamela Sykes

First edition (publ. Hamish Hamilton)

Come Back, Lucy (retitled Mirror of Danger in the US) is a story written by author Pamela Sykes in 1973. In 1978, it served as the basis of Come Back Lucy, a British mini-series produced by ATV.

== Synopsis ==
"Come Back, Lucy" centres on a little girl named Lucy who lives with her Aunt Olive in an old Victorian house. Upon the death of her aunt and the subsequent loss of her home, Lucy is welcomed into her cousins' house though she does not know them very well and has difficulty feeling at home. As time moves on, Lucy is visited by the ghost of a Victorian little girl who wishes for Lucy to become her friend.

== Adaptation ==
In 1978, ATV adapted Come Back, Lucy into a six-episode television series. It was adapted by Colin Shindler and Gail Renard, produced by Shaun O'Riordan and directed by Paul Harrison. Come Back, Lucy starred Emma Bahkle as Lucy and Phyllida Law as Aunt Gwen.

=== Cast ===
- Emma Bakhle as Lucy
- Bernadette Windsor as Alice
- Phyllida Law as Aunt Gwen
- Royce Mills as Uncle Peter
- Russell Lewis as Patrick
- Oona Kirsch as Rachel
- François Evans as Bill
- Eve Karpf as Mademoiselle
- Blake Butler as Dr. Brown
- Aimée Delamain as Aunt Olive
- Carol MacReady as Mrs. Clayton
- Joan Savage as Mrs. Naylor
- Harold Innocent as Mr. Peel
- Kevin Hudson as Mike
- Pat Keen as Mrs. Belling
- Miriam Mann as Marian
- Stephen Thorne as Vicar
- Joan Scott as Lady in Shop
- Sheri Shepstone as Lady Pianist
- Ricky Diamond as Young Man
