= Tiny and Crew =

- Created by: Andy Ellis; David Yates
- Voices of: Tony Timberlake; Jonathan Kydd; Marcus Clarke; Helena Smee; Sophie Aldred; Sarah Davidson; Gillie Robic
- Opening theme: Dave Cooke; Paul Field
- Country of origin: United Kingdom
- Original language: English
- No. of episodes: 42

Production
- Producer: Kathy Swain
- Running time: 20 minutes
- Production company: Flextech

Original release
- Network: Tiny Living
- Release: 11 September 1995 – 4 December 2006

Tiny and Crew is a British pre-school series which aired on Tiny TCC. Tiny TCC was replaced in 1997 by Living TV's time slot Tiny Living where the show continued.

== The Crew ==
Tiny was a huge yellow yeti (Known in the series as a Wigasaurus) Tiny had bright blue hair and was known for being larger the life. Tiny had a fixed age of just five years in the show. Tiny could not speak any English but as children would see he loved to learn new things about life. Tiny was joined by Dog, a puppet dog who loved nothing more than bones and playing hide and seek. Arabella, a puppet frog who would sometimes come across a little bossy but loved to try new things. The buddets, flowers who were known for their singing. It was not until the last series that they were seen to come alive. Tiny was joined by presenters Sarah Davison and Sophie Aldred (Sophie Socket.) Sophie left the show in 1996 to focus on presenting Words and Pictures for the BBC. And later to play the role of 'Mini the magician' in the ITV series Zzzap! She was replaced by Sarah. The series continued to air in re-runs between 1997 and 1999 when it moved to Living TV, with both Sophie and Sarah's episodes running simultaneously. In 2000, the programme was given a major revamp with several changes and the presenters role was dropped. A life -sized doll called Tammy (Tam) was then introduced. A new updated theme tune was created alongside a slightly new set. All the original music was reworked or changed. Gillie Robic took over as Arabella's puppeteer and voice.

== Aim of the show ==
Tiny and Crew was a programme that let children learn slowly by colours, shapes and numbers. Each episode lasted 20 minutes. The aim of the show was to find out what was under each coloured shape on the "playboard" by using a multi-coloured dice. That included real events in the outside world, telling stories, singing songs, the antics of Tiny Living presenters Dog and Arabella and trying to guess what was inside Tiny's bag. One of the main events often included the songs of some singing flowers "Budd and the Buddets".

== Tiny TCC mascot ==
The Character 'Tiny' was a mascot for The Children's Channel strand for younger children, 'Tiny TCC' in 1995 and 1996. He would feature alongside the presenter in between the strands pre-school shows. Clips from the series would also air throughout the block. When the strand moved to Living TV under the name Tiny Living, 'Dog' and 'Arabella' became the new mascots presenting in-vision presentation. In 2002, Arabella was dropped and Dog was joined by a male/female presenter. The presenters presenting the in-vision links included Emma Haley, Jo-Ann D‚Costa and Calum Callaghan.

== Home media ==
The show was released on VHS in 2001 entitled Tiny & Crew: New friend Tammy! The VHS release featured the episode 'Playing Games'. A music tape featuring Sophie Aldred was released in 1998 alongside a 'Tiny' plush doll.
