= Roger Royle =

British Anglican priest and broadcaster (born 1939)

The Reverend Canon Roger Royle
- Born: Roger Michael Royle; 30 January 1939 (age 87); Cardiff, Wales
- Citizenship: United Kingdom
- Education: St Edmund's School Canterbury
- Alma mater: King's College London; St Boniface Missionary College, Warminster
- Occupations: Priest and broadcaster
- Known for: Presenting Sunday Half Hour on BBC Radio 2 (1990–2007)

Roger Michael Royle (born 30 January 1939) is a British Anglican priest and broadcaster. He is known for having presented the Sunday Half Hour programme on BBC Radio 2 for 17 years from 1990 to 2007.

== Early life and education ==
Royle was born on 30 January 1939 in Cardiff, Wales. His father, Reginald, was vicar of St Saviour's church in Splott, Cardiff. His father died when Royle was 14 months old, and the family then moved to the Penylan area of the city.

Royle was educated at Marlborough Road and Roath Park primary schools in Cardiff. He then continued his education in England, attending St Edmund's School, then an all-boys private school in Canterbury, Kent, which was run by the Clergy Orphan Corporation. He studied theology at King's College London, graduating with an Associateship of King's College (AKC) qualification (equivalent to an ordinary degree) in 1961. He then undertook a year of training at St Boniface Missionary College, Warminster, in preparation for ordination.

== Ordained ministry ==
Royle was ordained in the Church of England as a deacon in 1962 and as a priest in 1963. From 1962 to 1965, he served his curacy at St Mary's Church, Portsea, Portsmouth, in the Diocese of Portsmouth. Then, from 1965 to 1968, he served as senior curate at St Peter's Church, Morden, London, in the Diocese of Southwark. Following his curacies, he moved to Southwark Cathedral where he served as succentor for the next three years.

In 1971, Royle moved to the Diocese of Oxford where he was appointed to his first incumbency. From 1971 to 1974, he served as priest-in-charge of St James the Less, Dorney, and warden of the Dorney Eton College Project. Between 1974 and 1979, he served as Conduct (IE the senior chaplain) of Eton College, an all-boys public school near Windsor, Berkshire.

After leaving Eton in 1979, Royle moved to London. There, he held a licence to officiate in the Diocese of Southwark from 1979 to 1990. He was chaplain to Lord Mayor Treloar College, a special school for disabled children and young people, between 1990 and 1992. During this appointment, he was also an honorary curate of the Assumption of the Blessed Virgin Mary, Froyle, in the Diocese of Winchester. From 1993 to 1999, he was an honorary canon and chaplain of Southwark Cathedral. He has held a permission to officiate in the Diocese of Southwark since 1999 and has been retired since 2004.

== Media career ==
Royle has been a presenter on a number of television series:

- Royle Progress for Southern Television
- The Royle Line for Ulster Television
- Songs of Praise for BBC One.

Royle's BBC career has also included presenting:

- Good Morning Sunday
- A Royle Tour
- Sunday Half Hour (from 1990 to 2007)

He was a regular contributor to the BBC Radio 4 programme Stop the Week.

He appeared on Pause for Thought on Terry Wogan's Radio 2 weekday show and writes a weekly column for Woman's Weekly.

== Retirement ==
On 4 March 2007, Royle said that he would be standing down from his longstanding position on Radio 2 presenting Sunday Half Hour, despite this he continued appearances on Pause for Thought on occasional weekday mornings. He also continued to present his Christmas Day early morning show on Radio 2 until 2017.

On 23 October 2014, Royle accepted the position of patron to mental health charity Being Alongside, formerly the Association for Pastoral Care in Mental Health (APCMH).

== Legacy ==
Eugene Kelly of The Vaselines used the alias 'The Very Reverend Roger Royle' in the 1980s, a reference to Royle.

== Honours ==
In 1992, Royle was awarded a Lambeth Master of Arts (MA) degree in recognition of his work in the media.

== Published works ==
- A Few Blocks from Broadway
- Royle Exchange
- To Have and To Hold
- Picking Up the Pieces – a book about Mother Teresa
