= Peta Lily =

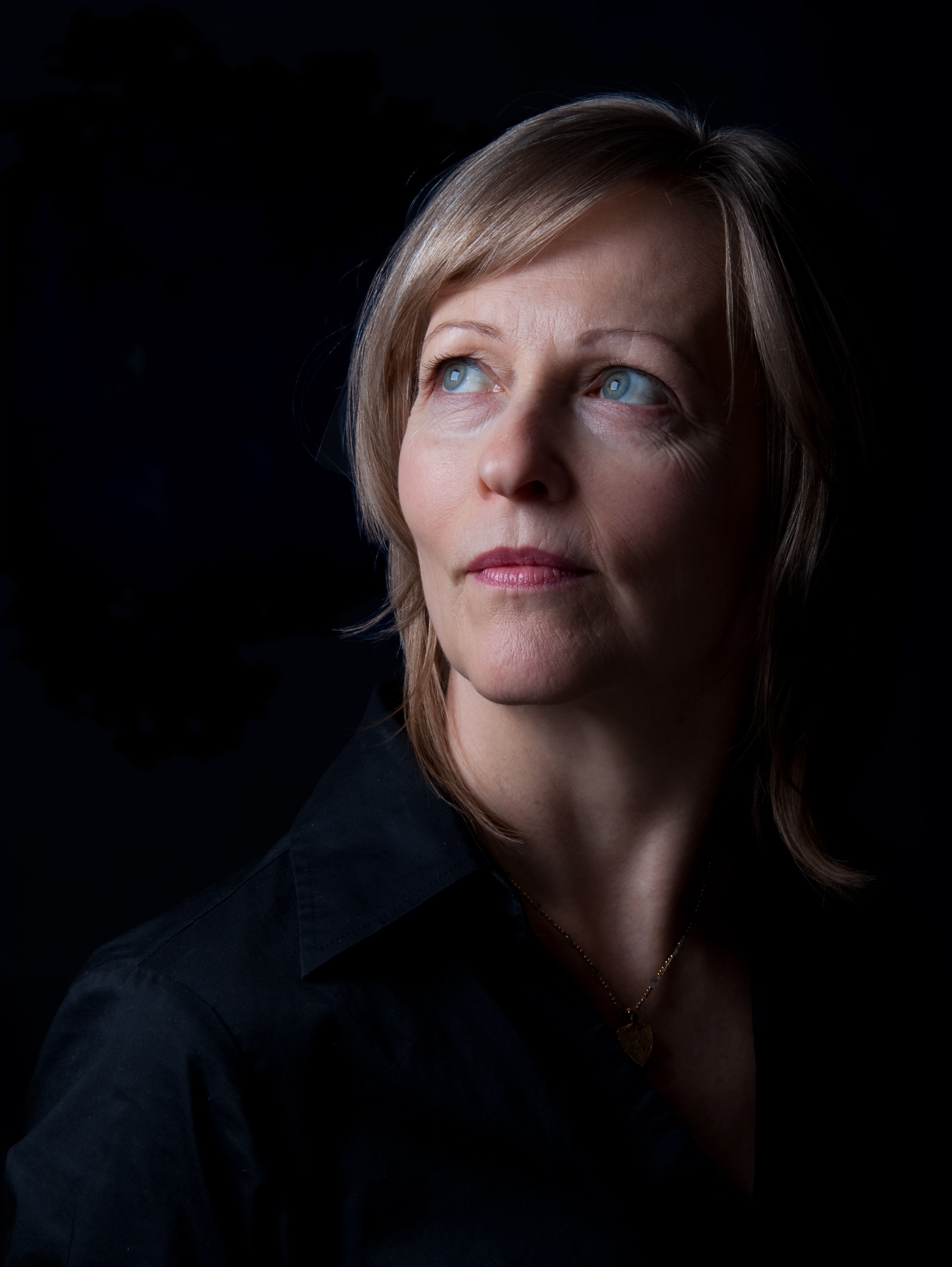
- Born: Brisbane, Queensland, Australia
- Occupations: Actress, Performer, Theatremaker, Director

Peta Lily (born Peta Wilhelmina Gottschalk) is a London-based performer/theatremaker and one of the ground-breaking performers involved in shaping the physical theatre work of the 1980s. She is well known for her one-woman shows, physical theatre productions and open workshops in Clown, Dark Clown, and Theatre Skills.

== Origins and Training ==
Lily was born in Brisbane, Australia, and majored in drama at the University of Queensland. She then worked in advertising for two and a half years as a copywriter and director of radio commercials. Lily played leading roles in a number of productions in Brisbane's La Boite Repertory Theatre before travelling to England and Europe.

In London, Lily trained together in mime with fellow students painter Tessa Schneideman and puppeteer Claudia Prietzel. The three eventually formed Britain's first all-female mime troupe, Three Women Mime Company, re-inventing the form and bringing a female point of view to mime's classic "everyman" clown. Lily performed with 'Three Women' in the UK and Europe for three years with shows High Heels and Follies Berserk and appeared at the London International Mime Festival, for which 'Three Women' made the cover of Time Out Magazine.

'Three Women' studied with Sankai Juku and Yoshi Oida, and with Theatre du Mouvement in Paris, and were one of a select number of physical theatre companies chosen to work with Jacques Le Coq in a special summer school in 1981. Lily then went on to study with Philippe Gaulier, Monika Pagneaux, Carlo Bosso of the Commedia dell'arte, and Master Yeung Kim Wah of the Cantonese Opera. She studied directing with Mike Alfreds, and acted as Movement Director to Alfreds’ production of The Dearly Beloved for Cambridge Theatre Company.

== Career ==
Lily's constant experimentation with form has resulted in numerous solo shows, some silent, many incorporating text. These include Red Heart, Hiroshima Mon Amour, Frightened of Nothing and Wendy Darling, an update of J.M. Barrie's Peter Pan which won a Fringe First Award in 1988.

With co-performer Philip Pellew, she toured as Peta Lily and Co. with shows Low Fidelity and Beg!, and collaborated with David Glass to create Whale, based on Melville's Moby Dick. Lily appeared in productions by the David Glass Ensemble, and toured with writer-performer Claire Dowie in Dowie's play All Over Lovely.

In 1999, Lily returned to solo work with the autobiographical Topless, followed by Midriff (2002), Invocation (2010), and Chastity Belt (2012), an examination of the relationship between sexuality and autonomy for women.

=== Dark Clown ===
Lily developed her Dark Clown work (exercises and theory) over many years of practical research, seeking to create clown characters and ensembles with more edge and relevance and a way to make a more exciting and demanding rapport with audiences. She writes:

While the Red Nose Clown has no past and a cartoon-like ability to bounce back from pratfalls, slaps and accidents. The Dark Clown has seen it all, feels it all and has no choice but to ‘sell’ his own pain for our entertainment. One experiences wonder, the other gazes at the abyss. The audience laughs, but while asking themselves: 'Should I really be laughing at this?'

The concept of enforced performance resulted in the creation of Hamlet or Die in 2001 (Hong Kong Fringe Club) and a startling production of The Maids in 2003 (TRYFUSS Theatre Company, Portugal), where female 'prisoners' were forced to perform Genet's play for a live audience.

Lily has worked as Dark Clown Consultant to Jammy Voo, Acrojou and John-Paul Zaccarrini.

=== Writing ===
Lily was mentored by April de Angelis and wrote the full-length play Blame (1994), which was short-listed for the Verity Bargate Award. Her play The Porter’s Daughter (a below stairs, women's eye view of the events in Shakespeare's Macbeth), was produced at the Cockpit Theatre, and on a UK and Germany tour, and she was commissioned by the Unity Theatre, Liverpool, to write and direct Random Oracle (2001). The dynamic poems included in the script of Chastity Belt are currently being developed into a book of verse.
