= Diane-Louise Jordan =

British television presenter

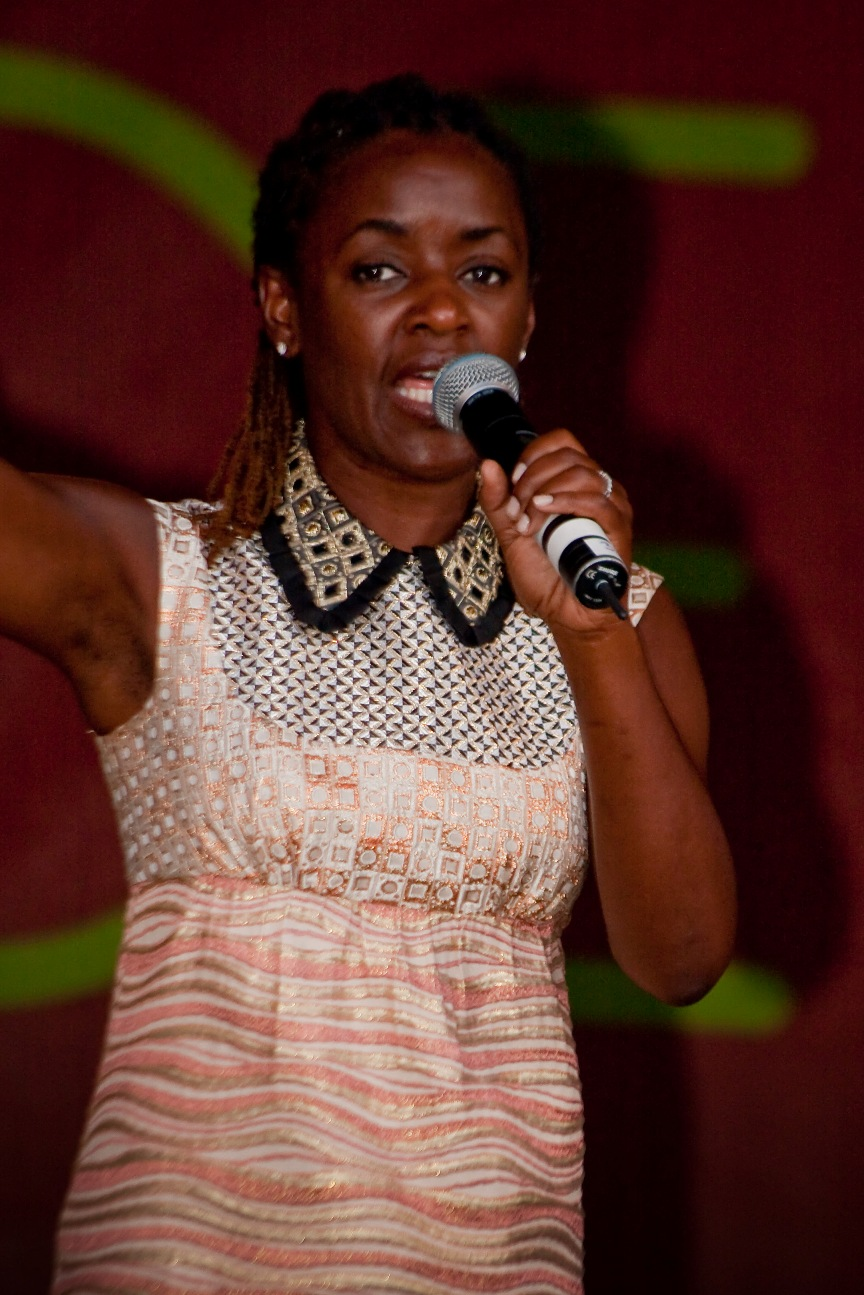
- Jordan in London in 2009.
- Born: 28 June 1960 (age 66); Hackney, London, England
- Education: Rose Bruford College
- Occupations: Television presenter, radio presenter
- Years active: 1989–present
- Known for: Blue Peter, Songs of Praise
- Spouse: Giles Broadbent (m. 2007; died 2023)
- Children: 1

Diane Johnson (born 28 June 1960), better known by her stage name Diane-Louise Jordan, is a British television presenter. She was the first black presenter of the children's television programme Blue Peter, being involved in the programme from 25 January 1990 until 26 February 1996. While on Blue Peter, her co-presenters were Yvette Fielding, John Leslie, Anthea Turner, Tim Vincent, Stuart Miles and Katy Hill.

== Life and career ==
Born in 1960, Jordan grew up in Hatfield, Hertfordshire. Her parents came over to England from Jamaica in the 1950s and were part of the Windrush generation. She attended Hatfield Comprehensive school, before studying theatre arts at Rose Bruford College, and worked as a stage actress after graduating. She appeared on children's series Corners, when she was spotted by Blue Peter editor Lewis Bronze. She became the programme's first black presenter and turned down a role in soap opera Coronation Street for the job. In 1988 she played the chemist shop assistant in the Mike Leigh film High Hopes. She later played the part of Kate Winterton in Coronation Street in September 1989.

Jordan presented BBC One's religious programme, Songs of Praise. She also is vice-president of Action for Children, sits on the Council of the Prince's Trust, is a Patron of the ADHD Foundation and is a trustee for BBC Children in Need. In 1997 she sat on the Diana, Princess of Wales, Memorial Committee. She is a celebrity supporter of the Bone Cancer Research Trust (BCRT)

She married violinist Giles Broadbent in 2007. Upon the unexpected death of Jordan's sister, she adopted her niece. Between February 2012 and July 2017 Jordan presented Sunday Half Hour and then Sunday Hour on BBC Radio 2. In 2023, she was awarded an honorary degree from Loughborough University for her outstanding contribution to broadcasting and her continued work championing equality and inclusivity.
