= Simon Davies (Welsh TV presenter) =

British television presenter

- Born: 7 May 1957 (age 68); Cardiff, Wales
- Occupation(s): Actor, writer, television presenter
- Known for: Tikkabilla
- Spouse: Laura Jeffery

Simon Davies (born 7 May 1957) is a Welsh television presenter, actor and writer. Simon born in Cardiff, Wales is married to Laura Jeffery. He is best known for his work in children's television. He presented the BBC television programme Tikkabilla, co-presented the BBC educational programme Corners, and narrated the second series of Our Planet shown on CBeebies in 2006.

Before that he presented Play School and was a bus driver and presenter in the series Playdays. He also did the KS2 National Tests Revise Wise.

Davies played the Sheriff of Nottingham in the Christmas pantomime Robin Hood that ran from 7 December 2007 to 6 January 2008 at the Connaught Theatre in Worthing, West Sussex. He can sometimes be seen presenting on Speedauction TV.
