= List of Puddle Lane books =

The Puddle Lane children's books were published by Ladybird Books during the second half of the 1980s. The stories were followed by a TV programme of the same name. Sheila K McCullagh, who wrote the stories for the TV programme, also wrote the books.

== History ==
The books are directed to children who are between the ages of 3.5 and 6.5. Five illustrators worked on the books. The first batch of 12 books was released on 12 September 1985.

After the books went out of print, the publisher Mercury Junior and Sheila McCullagh came to an agreement in 2006 to have the publisher print more copies of the books. The publisher targeted parents who in their youth were viewers of the television programme Puddle Lane to purchase the books.

== Premise ==
The books take place in Puddle Lane, a fictional place in Candletown. A magician lives in Puddle Lane as do cats who reside in his garden. There is the Griffle, an affable monster capable of partially disappearing. When he does this, viewers can see just his tail or his eyes and ears. The stories feature four kids: Sarah, Davy, Hari, and Gita.

== List of books ==
Five sets of books were produced, the first set being the easiest to read (Reading Programme Stage 1). Books of each set featured a distinct cover colour. All books are in hardcover format, 7 inches tall and 4.75 inches wide (standard Ladybird format). Here's a list of all 54 books in the series:

=== Stage 1 (blue covers) ===
1. Tim Catchamouse (31 October 1985)
2. Tessa and the Magician (31 October 1985)
3. The Magic Box (31 October 1985)
4. Mrs Pitter-Patter And The Magician (31 October 1985): After going up Puddle Lane telling people what they ought to be doing (as well as telling the children they should play in the Magician's garden), Mrs. Pitter-Patter disturbs the Magician from his nap, resulting in being shrunk by one of the Magician's magic spells.
5. The Vanishing Monster (31 October 1985)
6. The Wideawake Mice (31 October 1985)
7. The Flying Saucer (31 October 1985)
8. Two Green Ears (30 January 1986)
9. The Tale Of A Tail (31 October 1985)
10. The Griffle And Mr Gotobed (30 January 1986)
11. Look out! It's magic! (30 January 1986)
12. Tim Turns Green (30 January 1986): Tim accidentally stumbles upon the Magician's magic green sugar mice and consumes one, which changes him from a black cat into a green cat. Fortunately, when the Magician returns and finds out what Tim has done, he has the right magic colour sugar mouse to reverse the spell.
13. Tom Cat And The Wideawake Mice (30 January 1986)
14. Jeremy Mouse And Mr Puffle (30 January 1986)
15. Toby Spelldragon And The Magician (30 January 1986)
16. How Miranda Flew Down Puddle Lane (29 January 1987)
17. The Wideawake Mice Find A New Home (29 January 1987)
18. The Monster Loses His Beard (29 January 1987)
19. A Present for Aunt Matilda (29 January 1987)
20. Jeremy's Ride (29 January 1987)
21. Poor Peter Tall (29 January 1987)

=== Stage 2 (green covers) ===
1. When The Magic Stopped (31 October 1985)
2. Tessa in Puddle Lane (31 October 1985)
3. The Little Monster (31 October 1985)
4. The Dragon's Egg (31 October 1985)
5. The Gruffle (30 January 1986)
6. The Tidy Bird (30 January 1986)
7. Never Trust Dragons (30 January 1986)
8. The Wideawake Mice Go To Market (30 January 1986)
9. Danger! Dragon! (29 January 1987)
10. Magic Balloons (29 January 1987)
11. The Griffle And The Thief (29 January 1987)
12. Mr Grimble Grumbles (29 January 1987)
13. Adventure in the Wood (28 January 1988)
14. Mr Puffle and the Gruffle (28 January 1988)
15. Danger in the Magician's Garden (28 January 1988)
16. The Fox And The Magician (28 January 1988)

=== Stage 3 (orange covers) ===
1. Old Mr Gotobed (31 October 1985): On a rainy night, the wind blows off some tiles from the roof of Mr. Gotobed's house, causing rain to come in and make a puddle, but Mr. Gotobed doesn't know about it until the puddle leaks through the ceiling while he's in bed.
2. Hickory Mouse (31 October 1985): A mouse named Hickory meets the Wideawake Mice in the Magician's garden and boasts about his bravery by frightening the Griffle and Miss Pitter-Patter, but while entering Old Mr. Gotobed's house, finds himself imitating the actions of the nursery rhyme "Hickory Dickory Dock".
3. The Gruffle In Puddle Lane (30 January 1986)
4. The Magician's Party (30 January 1986): When the children of Puddle Lane decide to have a party, Miss Pitter-Patter insists there be no fireworks, but the Magician decides to add his magic to the party in a very special way.
5. The Magic Penny (30 January 1986)
6. Three Wishes And One More (29 January 1987)
7. Peter Puffle's Mouse (28 January 1988)
8. The Magic Dust (28 January 1988)
9. The Rescue of Father & Mother Mouse (28 January 1988)
10. Magic at Midnight (28 January 1988)

=== Stage 4 (purple covers) ===
1. When The Clock Struck Thirteen (31 October 1985): At the top of the clock tower in the Magician's House, an Iron Boy strikes the bell every hour of the day. One night at midnight, the Iron Boy strikes the bell thirteen times, bringing him to life and requests the Magician make him a real boy, but as the Magician's magic dust only works on toy animals and not iron people, he sends the Iron Boy on the Flying Saucer to the Country of Zorn, where the Iron Boy must go to the Blue Mountains where the magic waters of the Silver River can make him a real boy.
2. The Sandalwood Girl (31 October 1985): A Sandalwood Girl sits in the attic of the Magician's House. On the night the Iron Boy strikes the clock bell thirteen times, the Sandalwood Girl comes to life as well and, like the Iron Boy, would also like to be real. The Magician grants her request by sending her by owl to the Country of Zorn to meet up with the Iron Boy who has already arrived there.
3. On The Way To The Blue Mountains (30 January 1986): Upon meeting each other, the Iron Boy and Sandalwood Girl set out on their quest to the Blue Mountains. After spending the night at an old woman's house, their bravery is tested when the Iron Boy falls off a bridge over a river and the Sandalwood Girl has to help him.
4. The Fire in the Grass (30 January 1986): Continuing their quest, the Iron Boy and the Sandalwood Girl come to a large grass field where red fire-breathing dragons live. After narrowly escaping a dragon that sets fire to the grass (with the Iron Boy testing his bravery by carrying the Sandalwood Girl) and with help from a hare, they make their way to a cave where three flying Silver Ponies take them the rest of the way to the Blue Mountains.
5. The Silver River (30 January 1986): Upon arrival in the Blue Mountains, the Silver Ponies drop off the Iron Boy and the Sandalwood Girl at a cliff that overlooks a lake that has the magic waters of the Silver River. After an almost perilous climb down to a smaller cliff, the Iron Boy and the Sandalwood Girl jump into the river where they change into real children and meet a lady named Alanna who not only takes them to their new home in the City of Zorn, but gives them their names too.

=== Stage 5 (red covers) ===
1. The Magician's Raindrops (1 May 1987)
2. A Dragon In The Mountains (29 January 1987): While checking on the Iron Boy (now named Irun) and the Sandalwood Girl (now named Sandella) through his magic water, the Magician learns that a fire-breathing dragon is making its way through the Blue Mountains to the City of Zorn. To help save the children's new home, the Magician sends a swan along with a bag of Silver Seeds (that, under the light of the full moon, will grow into Silver Trees that turn anybody who touches them to stone) to Zorn. With help from the swan and a quorn, Irun and Sandella plant the Silver Seeds and stall the dragon long enough for the trees to grow and block the dragon's path.

=== Special books ===
1. Christmas in Puddle Lane (1 October 1987)^{1}
2. The Big Puddle Lane Storybook (28 January 1988)^{1}

^{1}Additionally, two standalone books were produced: Christmas in Puddle Lane and The Big Puddle Lane Story Book, both written by Sheila McCullagh. They contained several new stories and some songs.

== Reception ==
The Loughborough Echo's Bridget Dakin called the book series "a colourful and imaginative newcomer to the shelves designed to make learning fun". The newspaper said Puddle Lane stories have a mystical setting guaranteed to capture infants' imagination and interest." The Times Educational Supplement published a negative review of the book series.

In a positive review, Betty Root of the University of Reading's Reading and Language Information Centre wrote, "Teachers, parents and children will delight in these stories which create, so successfully, an imaginary world yet contain characters both animals and human to whom the young readers can relate. With the provision of context support in the early stages—adults read the long story and children the shorter version—the books will tolerate reading over and over again. Thus building the confidence of children first learning to read. In everyway Puddle Lane has changed the image of Ladybird readers."

Linda Ashworth of Child Education penned a mixed review of the book series. She praised the advice given to parents, writing, "The free guide for parents is very good. The information is given clearly in layman's terms and the advice is sound." She criticised the stories, writing, "The stories seem tame and don't stand up to reading aloud. They have been written to teach the children to read, not by an author simply wanting to tell a story. Aesthetically the books don't come up to the standard of picture story books by authors such as Anthony Browne, Pat Hutchins or Maurice Sendak. The Ladybird format kills any possibility of individuality or originality of presentation. Although the subject matter of the books—magic, fantasy, toys coming to life—usually captures children's imagination, these stories are just not up to the standard of Tim and the Hidden People."
