= Druid (band) =

Progressive rock band from England

- Origin: Berkhamsted, Hertfordshire, England, United Kingdom
- Genres: Progressive rock, symphonic rock, art rock
- Years active: 1971–1977
- Labels: EMI, BGO
- Past members: Neil Brewer; Cedric Sharpley (deceased); Dane Stevens; Pete Griffiths; Andrew McCrorie-Shand

Druid were a 1970s progressive rock band from England, and initially came to public attention by winning the Melody Maker Rock and Folk talent contest in 1974. The band went on to record two albums signed to EMI - Toward the Sun (1975) and Fluid Druid (1976). The band performed "Voices" and "Theme", from Toward the Sun on The Old Grey Whistle Test, broadcast on 7th October 1975. Their sound was notably influenced by Yes and Genesis.

Following the demise of Druid in 1977, aborting the recording of their third record Newfoundland, Neil Brewer and Dane Stevens formed The Never Never Band with a more post-punk sound. The band ultimately split up in 1981 into two short lived groups - The Vetos, and Splash.

Former member Cedric Sharpley, who went on to back Gary Numan in Dramatis and Tubeway Army, died from a heart attack on 13 March 2012. Keyboard player Andrew McCrorie-Shand later pursued a career composing for Ragdoll Productions, most notably their longest-running TV shows Rosie and Jim, while bass player Neil Brewer was the show's third and final presenter from 1997 to 2000.

== Line-up ==
- Cedric Sharpley – drums (founding member; died 2012)
- Neil Brewer – bass (founding member)
- Dane Stevens – vocals, guitars (founding member)
- Andrew McCrorie-Shand – keyboards (joined 1974)
- Pete Griffiths - keyboards (1971–73)

== Discography ==
=== Studio albums ===
==== Toward the Sun (1975) ====
Toward the Sun

Studio album by Druid
- Released: July 1975
- Recorded: Morgan Studios, London, England
- Genres: Progressive rock, symphonic rock, art rock
- Length: 47:27
- Label: EMI
- Producer: Bob Harris

Druid chronology
| Toward the Sun (1975) | Fluid Druid (1976) |

Professional ratings
Review scores
| Source | Rating |
|---|---|
| Allmusic | 3/5 stars |
| Sputnikmusic | 3.7/5 |

Side one

1. "Voices" (McCrorie-Shand/Dane) – 8:13
2. "Remembering" (Brewer/Dane) – 5:24
3. "Theme" (Brewer/Dane/McCrorie-Shand/Sharpley) – 5:24
4. "Toward the Sun" (Dane) – 5:03

Side two

1. "Red Carpet for an Autumn" (Brewer/McCrorie-Shand) – 3:10
2. "Dawn of Evening" (Brewer/McCrorie-Shand) – 10:02
3. "Shangri-La" (Brewer/Dane) – 10:11

Personnel

- Neil Brewer – Bass Guitar
- Cedric Sharpley – Drums, Percussion
- Dane – Guitars, Vocals
- Andrew McCrorie-Shand – Keyboards
- Bob Harris – Producer
- George Nicholson – Engineer
- Adrian Sadgrove – Artwork

==== Fluid Druid (1976) ====
Fluid Druid

Studio album by Druid
- Released: May 1976
- Recorded: Advision Studios, London, England
- Genres: Progressive rock, symphonic rock, art rock
- Length: 39:32
- Label: EMI
- Producers: Druid, Paul "Rockette" Hardiman

Druid chronology
| Toward the Sun (1975) | Fluid Druid (1976) |

Professional ratings
Review scores
| Source | Rating |
|---|---|
| Allmusic | 3/5 stars |
| Sputnikmusic | 3.6/5 |

Side one

1. "Razor Truth" (Dane/Brewer) – 5:42
2. "Painters Clouds" (Dane/Brewer) – 5:00
3. "FM 145" (McCrorie-Shand) – 2:08
4. "Crusade" (McCrorie-Shand/Brewer) – 7:48

Side two

1. "Nothing but Morning" (Dane/Brewer) – 4:09
2. "Barnaby" (Dane) – 3:12
3. "Kestrel" (McCrorie-Shand) – 3:35
4. "Left to Find" (McCrorie-Shand/Dane/Brewer) – 7:12
5. "The Fisherman's Friend" (McCrorie-Shand) – 0:46

Personnel

- Neil Brewer – Bass Guitar
- Cedric Sharpley – Drums, Percussion
- Dane – Guitars, Vocals
- Andrew McCrorie-Shand – Keyboards
- Druid, Paul "Rockette" Harman – Producer
- Ken "Superstar" Thomas – Assistant Engineer
- The Cream Group – Artwork

=== Singles ===
- Barnaby/Kestrel/Nothing But Morning (1976, EMI)

=== Compilations ===
- Toward the Sun / Fluid Druid (1995, BGO Records)
