= Ray Mutimer =

British illustrator

Ray Mutimer is a British illustrator.

Ray Ivan Gerald Mutimer was born in 1937. His parents, Olive and Aubrey, and an older sister, Janet, lived in the village of Gorefield, near Wisbech "Capital of the Fens" of East Anglia. He was educated at Gorefield village school and passed his 11+ to Wisbech Boys Grammar School. His artistic skills and enthusiasm were encouraged, not by the school, but by Bill Wright, who had a signwriting business, and an Art Materials and Photography shop in Wisbech. Ray was proficient in drawing, watercolour and oil painting at the age of 15. Thanks to Bill Wright who was his mentor at that time. Unaware of such a thing as an Art School, Ray applied for a 2 Year Teacher Training Course at Trent Park Teacher Training College, Barnet. The college specialised in Music, Art and Drama.

He first had to do his National Service with the Suffolk Regiment from 1955 to 1975. He joined the Intelligence Section, served in Germany and on active service in Cyprus. Reached the rank of Corporal - unusual for national service personnel.

== Early career ==
At college he met his future wife, Christine Spence. He moved to Yorkshire, her home county. After gaining experience in a Leeds school and Christchurch Boys School Harrogate, he eventually became Head of Art and Craft at St Aidan's C.E. High School in Harrogate. Whilst teaching, he continued his own personal paintings and exhibited widely in the North of England during the sixties and seventies. He had two paintings in the Contemporary British Watercolours Exhibition at the Royal Watercolour Society Galleries. He went on to have thirty one-man shows. He was also selected for many annual regional group exhibitions such as the West Riding Artists' Exhibition (Wakefield), Modern Art in Yorkshire (9 artists) and Yorkshire Artists exhibitions.

His first illustrations were cartoon drawings, about teaching, which were regularly published in the Times Educational Supplement and Teacher's World.

He became interested in children's book illustration, and after overcoming a series of rejections, Yorkshire Television used his artwork in the national T.V. school and pre-school programmes My World and Stepping Stones. His illustrations for traditional and new stories, including some of his own, were shown on the programmes for four years.

== Illustration ==
In 1980, he became a freelance illustrator.

Working with Michael Benn Publishing, Ray originated and published educational material for industry. One of its successes was time charts which took the form of a 4-part frieze showing the history of an industry or institution. Each had about 50 pictures blended into a montage. Ray illustrated history Time Charts for The Inland Revenue, The Banking Information Service, The Royal Mint, Pilkington Glass (history of windows), Thames Water and The Atomic Energy Authority. He also designed and illustrated fourteen A1 and A2 posters for similar institutions, including The Royal Society of Arts.

== Books ==
Postman Pat is a TV character created by Ivor Wood and writer John Cunliffe. In 1989 Ray started his first series of 12 Postman Pat picture books called "Tales from Greendale", published by Andre Deutsch Children's Books and Scholastic. These were followed by four books based on new TV episodes. He also did associated activity and sticker books.

For Egmont Publishing he did a number of Postman Pat board books for younger children drawn in a simple heavy black line style and computer coloured. Ray drew eight Postman Pat Annuals from 1993 to 2000.

Between 1997 and 2005, Ray worked on educational books for Africa and the Caribbean for Macmillan Education. Covering an enormous range of subjects in 24 books. Some were illustrations for a traditional African story, some were factual, some descriptive, religious, decorative, some picture stories, some comic, some pure adventure.

He brought his individual slant to classic rhymes and fairy stories in The Award book of Tales and Rhymes, published by Award Publications in 1999.

== Magazines and comics ==
From 1982 to 1988, Mutimer wrote, designed and illustrated pages of craft "how to make" activities for children. These appeared in various comics, mostly for girls. The longest running was "Make with Mum" in Pepper Street, published by DC Thomson.

For four years, he drew another TV character created by Ivor Wood, Charlie Chalk. He drew 2 or 3 pictures strips and the occasional activity page each week in the Postman Pat Weekly Children's magazine published by Fleetway. Towards the end of the comic's life he also drew Postman Pat on the covers and inside. He gave the fortnightly "Play and Learn Postman Pat" spin off striking fully painted covers as well as interior picture strips.

Working for Marvel UK from 1992 to 1994, on Rupert and friends and Rupert Learn and Play – weekly children's picture strip magazines, Ray illustrated four page picture stories and activity pages called Bingo's Workshop.

Ray also contributed to various BBC Publications Children's magazines.

== Children's Magazines in which work regularly appeared ==
Title	Dates
DC Thomson
Pepper Street	1984 – 1987
Fleetway Publications
Postman Pat weekly	1990 – 1994
Postman Pat learn and Play	
Marvel UK
Rupert and friends	1992 – 1994
Rupert learn and Play	
BBC Children's magazines
Toybox	1997 – 2003
Toybox Teach Me	2001 – 2003
Noddy	1994 – 1999
Starhill Ponies	1999 – 2000

== Later exhibitions ==
August 2004. "Original Postman Pat illustrations." Newby Hall, Ripon. 65 pictures.

May 2005. Heild Gallery, Bishop Monkton.

August 2005. "Original Postman Pat illustrations." Newby Hall, Ripon. 63 pictures.

August 2006. "Original Postman Pat illustrations." Newby Hall, Ripon. 62 pictures.

September 2006. “Great North Art Show.” (Group Show.) Ripon Cathedral, Ripon. 4 paintings.

August 2007. "Original Postman Pat illustrations." Newby Hall, Ripon. 71 pictures.

September 2007. “Great North Art Show.” (Group Show.) Ripon Cathedral, Ripon. 4 paintings.

December 2007. “Postman Pat illustrations.” Preston Hall Museum, Stockton-on-Tees. (Raising funds for the Butterwick Hospice Extension Appeal.)

August 2008. "Original Postman Pat illustrations." Newby Hall, Ripon. 65 pictures.

September 2008. “Great North Art Show.” (Group Show.) Ripon Cathedral, Ripon. 4 paintings.

September 2009. “Great North Art Show.” (Group Show.) Ripon Cathedral, Ripon. 4 paintings.

August 2011. The March Hare Gallery, Ripon.

December 2011. “A Little Imagination.” Art in the Mill, Knaresborough.

July & August 2012. “Postman Pat and others” Nunnington Hall, York.

July, August & September 2013. Assorted illustrations at Beningbrough Hall. Yorkshire.

March 2015. Tennant's Garden gallery, Harrogate.

April 2015. St Michaels Hospice, Harrogate. (Solo fund raising show.)

June 2015. Mercer Gallery, Harrogate. 1 painting, 1 drawing.

April, May & June 2016. Preston Hall Museum, Stockton-on-Tees. 28 paintings and 28 illustrations.

== Bibliography (partial) ==
Title	Author	Artist	Publisher	Date	ISBN
The Eye of Elba	Charles Jackson	Ray Mutimer	Aberlard-Schuman	1976	0200723634
The Secret of Kellerman's Studio	Ken Follett	Ray Mutimer	Aberlard-Schuman	1976	0200723022
Roger Moore and the Crimefighters series
The Anchor Trick	Anthony Wall	Ray Mutimer	Everest Books	1977	0905018680
Death in Demins	Dulcie Gray	Ray Mutimer	Everest Books	1977	0905018702
Crook Ahoy	Fielden Hughes	Ray Mutimer	Everest Books	1977	0905018397
1001 Shoplifters	Robin Smyth	Ray Mutimer	Everest Books	1977	0905018370
The Siege	Malcolm Hulke	Ray Mutimer	Everest Books	1977	0905018001
The Secrets Man	Deben Holt	Ray Mutimer	Everest Books	1977	0905018664
Roundabouts series
The Giant's Socks	Ben Butterworth	Ray Mutimer	E J Arnold & Son	1978	0560015240
The Witch and the Broomstick	Ben Butterworth	Ray Mutimer	E J Arnold & Son	1978	0560015275
The Princess and the Dragon	Ben Butterworth	Ray Mutimer	E J Arnold & Son	1978	0560015267
The Princess Who Could Not Cry	Ben Butterworth	Ray Mutimer	E J Arnold & Son	1978	0560015259
Beware of the Man with No Name	Jim Rogerson	Ray Mutimer	E J Arnold & Son	1979	0560015534
Mountain Fever	Jim Rogerson	Ray Mutimer	E J Arnold & Son	1979	0560015542
The Sands of the Marjee	Jim Rogerson	Ray Mutimer	E J Arnold & Son	1979	0560015550
It is Always Dark for a Blind Man	Jim Rogerson	Ray Mutimer	E J Arnold & Son	1979	0560015526
Tim and the Hidden People series
News from the North	Sheila K McCullagh	Ray Mutimer	E J Arnold & Son	1980	0560013892
The Cry in the Dark	Sheila K McCullagh	Ray Mutimer	E J Arnold & Son	1980	0560013906
The Shield Stone	Sheila K McCullagh	Ray Mutimer	E J Arnold & Son	1980	0560013914
The Storm over the Sea	Sheila K McCullagh	Ray Mutimer	E J Arnold & Son	1980	0560013922
The Cave of the Wind Witches	Sheila K McCullagh	Ray Mutimer	E J Arnold & Son	1980	0560013930
In Diaman's Cave	Sheila K McCullagh	Ray Mutimer	E J Arnold & Son	1980	0560013949
Danger on the Moor	Sheila K McCullagh	Ray Mutimer	E J Arnold & Son	1980	0560013957
At the Hill of the Stone Prisons	Sheila K McCullagh	Ray Mutimer	E J Arnold & Son	1980	0560013965
Burglars in the Yard	Sheila K McCullagh	Ray Mutimer	Arnold-Wheaton	1983	0560014007
The Wild Witches and the Talisman	Sheila K McCullagh	Ray Mutimer	Arnold-Wheaton	1983	056001399X
Magic in the North	Sheila K McCullagh	Ray Mutimer	Arnold-Wheaton	1983	0560014015
Tim and the People of the Moonlight	Sheila K McCullagh	Ray Mutimer	Arnold-Wheaton	1983	0560013981
The Relay Readers series
A mad Scramble!	Barrie Johnson	Ray Mutimer	Schofield & Sims	1982	(ISBN allocated to a set of Six books)
What a Catch!	Barrie Johnson	Ray Mutimer	Schofield & Sims	1982	(ISBN allocated to a set of Six books)
Pot Shots	Barrie Johnson	Ray Mutimer	Schofield & Sims	1982	(ISBN allocated to a set of Six books)
Lost and Found	Barrie Johnson	Ray Mutimer	Schofield & Sims	1982	(ISBN allocated to a set of Six books)
One Good Turn...	Barrie Johnson	Ray Mutimer	Schofield & Sims	1982	(ISBN allocated to a set of Six books)
The Final Score	Barrie Johnson	Ray Mutimer	Schofield & Sims	1982	(ISBN allocated to a set of Six books)
No Hiding Place	Barrie Johnson	Ray Mutimer	Schofield & Sims	1982	(ISBN allocated to a set of Six books)
A Near Thing!	Barrie Johnson	Ray Mutimer	Schofield & Sims	1982	(ISBN allocated to a set of Six books)
The Bullfighter	Barrie Johnson	Ray Mutimer	Schofield & Sims	1982	(ISBN allocated to a set of Six books)
No Contest!	Barrie Johnson	Ray Mutimer	Schofield & Sims	1982	(ISBN allocated to a set of Six books)
A Bad Break	Barrie Johnson	Ray Mutimer	Schofield & Sims	1982	(ISBN allocated to a set of Six books)
Canal junk	Barrie Johnson	Ray Mutimer	Schofield & Sims	1982	(ISBN allocated to a set of Six books)
Strange Meeting	Barrie Johnson	Ray Mutimer	Schofield & Sims	1982	(ISBN allocated to a set of Six books)
Pit Stop!	Barrie Johnson	Ray Mutimer	Schofield & Sims	1982	(ISBN allocated to a set of Six books)
Not a Leg to Stand On!	Barrie Johnson	Ray Mutimer	Schofield & Sims	1982	(ISBN allocated to a set of Six books)
Race Against the Tide	Barrie Johnson	Ray Mutimer	Schofield & Sims	1982	(ISBN allocated to a set of Six books)
Bringing the House Down!	Barrie Johnson	Ray Mutimer	Schofield & Sims	1982	(ISBN allocated to a set of Six books)
A Fair Cop!	Barrie Johnson	Ray Mutimer	Schofield & Sims	1982	(ISBN allocated to a set of Six books)
Christmas Shopping	Barrie Johnson	Ray Mutimer	Schofield & Sims	1982	(ISBN allocated to a set of Six books)
Gone Fishing!	Barrie Johnson	Ray Mutimer	Schofield & Sims	1982	(ISBN allocated to a set of Six books)
Home and Away	Barrie Johnson	Ray Mutimer	Schofield & Sims	1982	(ISBN allocated to a set of Six books)
Witch Hunt!	Barrie Johnson	Ray Mutimer	Schofield & Sims	1982	(ISBN allocated to a set of Six books)
A fighting Chance!	Barrie Johnson	Ray Mutimer	Schofield & Sims	1982	(ISBN allocated to a set of Six books)
Postman Pat - Tales From Greendale series
Pat and the Puzzle Parcels	John Cunliffe	Ray Mutimer	Andre Deutsch / Scholastic	1990	0233984178
Granny Dryden's Runaway Pig	John Cunliffe	Ray Mutimer	Andre Deutsch / Scholastic	1990	0233984186
Ted Glen's New Year Promises	John Cunliffe	Ray Mutimer	Andre Deutsch / Scholastic	1990	0233986294
Julian and the Vacuum Cleaner	John Cunliffe	Ray Mutimer	Andre Deutsch / Scholastic	1991	0233985905
Miss Hubbard's New Hat	John Cunliffe	Ray Mutimer	Andre Deutsch / Scholastic	1991	0233986510
Postman Pat's Wild Cat Chase	John Cunliffe	Ray Mutimer	Andre Deutsch / Scholastic	1992	023365432X
Reverend Timms Gives a Film Show	John Cunliffe	Ray Mutimer	Andre Deutsch / Scholastic	1993	0590540912
Postman Pat and the Flood	John Cunliffe	Ray Mutimer	Andre Deutsch / Scholastic	1994	0590541250
Postman Pat series
Postman Pat and the Toy Soldiers	John Cunliffe	Ray Mutimer	Andre Deutsch / Scholastic	1991	0590550543
Postman Pat Takes the Bus	John Cunliffe	Ray Mutimer	Andre Deutsch / Scholastic	1992	0590540416
Postman pat and the Barometer	John Cunliffe	Ray Mutimer	Andre Deutsch / Scholastic	1994	0590541749
Postman Pat and the Tuba	John Cunliffe	Ray Mutimer	Andre Deutsch / Scholastic	1994	0590541641
Annuals
Postman Pat Annual 1993	John Escott	Ray Mutimer & Christine Mutimer	World international	1992	0749809108
Postman Pat Annual 1994	John Escott	Ray Mutimer & Christine Mutimer	World international	1993	0749813512
Postman Pat Annual 1995	John Escott	Ray Mutimer & Christine Mutimer	World international	1994	0749819952
Postman Pat Annual 1996	Brenda Apsley	Ray Mutimer & Christine Mutimer	World international	1995	0749823143
Postman Pat Annual 1997	Brenda Apsley	Ray Mutimer & Christine Mutimer	World international	1996	0749828005
Postman Pat Annual 1998	Brenda Apsley	Ray Mutimer & Christine Mutimer	World international	1997	074983384X
Postman Pat Annual 1999	Brenda Apsley	Ray Mutimer & Christine Mutimer	World international	1998	0749837705
Postman Pat Annual 2000	Brenda Apsley	Ray Mutimer & Christine Mutimer	World international	1999	0749842881
Charlie Chalk Annual 1992	Geoffrey Cowan	Ray Mutimer & Christine Mutimer	World international	1991	0749802715
