= Don't Forget the Bacon! =

Book by Pat Hutchins

- Book cover
- Author: Pat Hutchins
- Illustrator: Pat Hutchins
- Language: English
- Subject: Shopping
- Genre: Children's literature
- Publisher: Bodley Head
- Publication date: 1976
- Publication place: England
- Media type: Print (Hardcover)
- OCLC: 001504849
- LC Class: 75017935

Don't Forget the Bacon! is a children's book written and illustrated by Pat Hutchins. It was published by Bodley Head in 1976. The story is about a little boy who tries to memorise a list of groceries his mother has asked him to buy. The book has been used as a teaching tool to instruct children about early learning concepts.

In an analysis of teaching tools for remedial readers, Maurice Saxby notes in the book Books in the Life of a Child: Bridges to Literature & Learning, "Hutchins's Don't Forget the Bacon has been one of my most successful texts." Andrea Hillbrick's Tuning in with Task Cards includes a teaching lesson structured around the boy's shopping list from the story. The book Foundation Blocks suggests Don't Forget the Bacon! be used to teach children about the concept of miscommunication, and Bilinguality and Literacy lists the story among those used to help assist a bilingual child develop fluency in English.

Don't Forget the Bacon! was a success in England and the United States, and received positive reception from the American Library Association, and The Washington Post. The story was recommended in 2005 as part of a children's reading challenge announced by the Education Minister for New South Wales, Australia, and included in suggested reading by The Times as part of the 2008 recognition of World Book Day.

== Plot ==
A little boy leaves his home with his dog to shop for groceries, trying to remember the list of things she wanted him to buy. The original request from his mother is "six farm eggs, a cake for tea, a pound of pears, and don't forget the bacon". In order to avoid forgetting items, the boy recites his mother's list to himself. One by one, items on his list become substituted by other things along the way that play tricks with his memory. "Six farm eggs" becomes "six fat legs", then "six clothes pegs"; "a cake for tea" becomes "a cape for me", then "a rake for leaves"; and "a pound of pears" becomes "a flight of stairs", then "a pile of chairs". By the end of his trip, the boy has forgotten the initial items requested. He goes to the junk shop, and asks for "six clothes pegs, a rake for leaves, and a pile of chairs please!".

On the way home, he remembers the original items from the original grocery list, and buys them instead: "six farm eggs, a cake for tea, and a pound of pears". However, he has forgotten the bacon. When he reaches home, he says, "I forgot the bacon!", and his mother gasps out loud.

The final page shows the child carrying a basket and a coin purse, taking his dog on another trip to get the bacon.

== Themes ==
In his work Best Books for Beginning Readers, Thomas G. Gunning places Don't Forget the Bacon! within the themes of utilising humor in the learning process with children. Don't Forget the Bacon! has been used as a learning tool for children in education, in order to teach them about various themes including miscommunication, responsibility, and the reliability of spoken language. In an analysis of teaching tools for remedial readers, Maurice Saxby notes in the book Books in the Life of a Child: Bridges to Literature & Learning, "Hutchins's Don't Forget the Bacon has been one of my most successful texts." The book is utilised in author Andrea Hillbrick's Tuning in with Task Cards as a teaching lesson: children are assigned to collect items from the initial and final versions of the shopping list from the boy in the story, and subsequently total the prices of the tabulated items. It is listed by Manjula Datta in the book Bilinguality and Literacy: Principles and Practice among stories to help assist a bilingual child develop fluency in the English language. Joy Palmer and Joanna C. Birch list the book in their work Geography in the Early Years as a recommendation for children among "Story Books Suitable as Starting Points in Geography". In her book Foundation Blocks: Personal, Social and Emotional Development, Mavis Brown suggests the story be used to teach children about the theme of miscommunication. The story is used in a case study in education, which is cited in the book Improving Teaching and Learning in the Core Curriculum by Kate Ashcroft and John Lee. Children were read the story, and then asked "about how and why spoken language is sometimes unreliable – and its consequences."

Books including Belair Early Years: Stories, Books as Bridges: Using Text to Connect Home and School Literacy and Learning, Funny Photo Alphabet: Teaching Guide, and What Is It About Me You Can't Teach? suggest the story be used to teach children about rhyming, repetition, and prediction. The story is suggested for use in curriculum to teach children about food, in books Humanics National Preschool Assessment Handbook, and The Complete Daily Curriculum for Early Childhood. Mildred R. Donoghue writes in Language Arts: Integrating Skills for Classroom Teaching that the story should be utilised in the course of primary education. In their work Success in Reading and Writing, authors Barbara J. Blackford, Helen Cappleman and Betty Cramer suggest the book be read aloud to children in kindergarten, and the teacher should subsequently quiz members of the class to see if they can recall items from the boy's shopping list. Authors Diane Stirling, Linda McKay, Georgia Archibald and Shelley Berg recommend the story in their book Character Education Connections: For School, Home and Community, in order to teach children the character trait of responsibility: "A willingness to be accountable for your own actions without blaming others."

== Background ==
Pat Hutchins was born 18 June 1942. A native of Yorkshire, she attended a local art school for three years on scholarship before studying illustration at the Leeds College of Art. Hutchins's first children's work, Rosie's Walk, was named a 1968 ALA Notable Book, and her book The Wind Blew received the 1974 Kate Greenaway Medal. She lives in London and has written twenty-five books and five novels.

== Publication history ==
Don't Forget the Bacon! was published by Bodley Head in 1976. It was published again in New York by Greenwillow Books in 1976, and Puffin Books in 1976 and 1978. An edition by imprint Picture Puffin was published in London in 1978. Imperial Educational Resources produced a version of the story in 1980, as a filmstrip geared for children in primary school. It was published by Live Oak Media in 2004, and by Paw Prints in 2009. Gallaudet University produced a DVD video edition aimed at youth versed in sign language.

== Reception ==
Don't Forget the Bacon! became a successful book in both England and the United States; Hutchins has become known for the work. Sharron L. McElmeel wrote in An Author a Month (for Nickels), "This is an example of Hutchins's more realistic drawings and of a reversible text." A reversible text refers to a story which proceeds in the forward direction, and concludes with the protagonist returning to a development introduced at the story's inception. The American Library Association gave Don't Forget the Bacon! favourable mention in its review of the book, "The picture book crowd (kindergarten through second grade) will adore Pat Hutchin's story of a grocery list and a bad memory." In an article for The Washington Post, associate professor and director of the reading clinic at Western Maryland College, Joan Coley, observed that the repetitive nature of the story is appealing to children.

Michele Landsberg, author of Reading for the Love of It: Best Books for Young Readers noted in an article for The Washington Post that Pat Hutchins is "best known" for her "witty picture books", including Don't Forget the Bacon!. In 2005, New South Wales, Australia, Education Minister Carmel Tebutt announced Don't Forget the Bacon! had been included as part of "Premier's Reading Challenge", under the section, "The 2006 Challenge Book Lists: Years K-2 Challenge". In 2008, Elizabeth McFarlane of The Times included the book in a list of works recommended to encourage children's reading skills for World Book Day.

== See also ==
- Children's literature criticism
- List of children's classic books
- List of children's literature authors
- List of illustrators
- List of publishers of children's books

== Endnotes ==
^^{[A]} Secondary source references consulted to assist in summarising information for Plot section include Brodt 1987, Elleman 1976, and McElmeel 1990.
