= Mutimer =

Mutimer is a surname. Notable people with the surname include:

- Jim Mutimer, New Zealand international footballer
- Kurt Mutimer (born 1997), Australian rules footballer
- Ray Mutimer, British illustrator
- Wally Mutimer (1907–1984), Australian rules footballer
