= Andrew McCrorie-Shand =

British composer (born 1955)

- Born: Andrew William John McCrorie-Shand; 14 May 1955 (age 71); Cheltenham, Gloucestershire, England
- Origin: Birmingham, West Midlands, England
- Genre: Television score
- Occupation: Television composer
- Years active: 1974–present
- Website: Official website

Andrew William John McCrorie-Shand (born 14 May 1955) is a British composer. He is mostly known for having composed musical scores for children's television programmes, including the original theme tune for Teletubbies, and also the chart topping hit that followed it, Teletubbies say "Eh-oh!". McCrorie-Shand has also composed the music for Rosie and Jim, Brum and Tots TV.

== Biography ==
He was born in Cheltenham, Gloucestershire into a musical family and taught to play piano from age 5. McCrorie-Shand joined the mid-1970s progressive rock band Druid as the keyboardist for the band's two studio albums on EMI Records. He later worked with other performers of the era such as Curved Air, Leo Sayer, Sally Oldfield, Billy Ocean and Sarah Brightman.

McCrorie-Shand was later looked upon by the children's production company Ragdoll Productions and chosen to work on TV shows such as Teletubbies, Brum, Tots TV, Boohbah, Rosie and Jim (of which fellow Druid member Neil Brewer was a presenter), The Adventures of Abney & Teal, Twirlywoos, and B.O.T. and the Beasties.

McCrorie Shand composed music for Carrie and David's Popshop.

McCrorie-Shand appeared in the Rosie and Jim episode "Recording Studio" with Druid bass guitarist Neil Brewer.

He did not return for the 2015 revival of Teletubbies, although it features orchestral versions of his original theme.
