= Diary from the Dome =

Book by Paul Harris

Diary From the Dome: Reflections on Fear and Privilege During Katrina is a memoir written by Paul Harris and was the first one written about what it was like inside of the Louisiana Superdome during Hurricane Katrina. It was published by Vantage Press in 2008. Evacuees used the Superdome in New Orleans as a refuge of last resort beginning the day before Hurricane Katrina made landfall on August 29, 2005. The book details the author's experiences as a Californian tourist who was unable to evacuate New Orleans as the airport, Amtrak, and Greyhound Bus station all closed a day prior to the mandatory evacuation and two days prior to the Category 3 storm making landfall.

The book deals with the supportive as well as the unruly behavior by individuals within the confines of the Superdome, as well as concentrating on the author's views on the power of fear, groupthink, and rumor to control human behavior. The unsanitary conditions within the Superdome are described fully. The author also talks of being smuggled out of the Superdome after three days with a group of international visitors, where they experience more challenges to their survival.

Discussion about future ways emergency personnel and disaster relief organizations may better offer assistance to those in need are spelled out. Finally the author, Paul Harris discusses where the media was accurate and inaccurate in what it reported going on inside the Superdome. Rumors were rampant about rapes and murders within the stadium of the New Orleans Saints, but weeks later authorities were unable to verify any of these reports, and attributed these to miscommunication and simply passing on hearsay.
