= Titch (TV series) =

- Series logo
- Created by: Pat Hutchins
- Starring: Peter Jones (Series 1 and 2); Paul Vaughan (Series 3)
- Country of origin: United Kingdom
- No. of series: 3
- No. of episodes: 39 (13 missing)

Production
- Running time: 10 minutes
- Production companies: Hutchins Film Company; Yorkshire Television

Original release
- Network: ITV (CITV); Milkshake!
- Release: 26 September 1997 – June 2001

Titch is a British stop-motion children's television programme that originally aired on Children's ITV from 1997 to 2001, then from 2001 to 1 January 2006 on Tiny Living, before appearing on Milkshake! in September 2004 as Tiny Living went off-air. It was created by Pat Hutchins, also the creator of the Titch book series.

== Production ==
According to Pat Hutchins, each episode took three weeks to shoot as it was created in stop-motion animation, using clay models instead of proposed cartoons. The models were miniatures, as ITV gave the animating team a limited budget so that production or scale was minimalistic. After the first two series finished airing in 1999, a third series went into production, and premiered during 2000, before it had its final episode in mid-2001. There is no disclosed reason why the programme finished but Hutchins reportedly said it became too costly and time-consuming to create. Due to its immense popularity repeats of the programme aired occasionally until around 2003 and then repeated on Tiny Living. The programme moved to Milkshake! on Channel 5 between 5 September 2004 and 15 January 2008 with updated titles credited to 2005.

== Music and DVD ==
The music for Titch was composed by British pianist & composer Michael Nyman. The theme song was originally sung by Nicholas Battye, before it was re-recorded with a new vocalist for 2005 repeats.

The series was issued on several videos in the 1990s. DVDs were released in 2005, titled Picnic and Other Stories and Christmas.
