= Tim and the Hidden People =

Children's' book series

- Front cover of first book in series
- Author: Sheila K. McCullagh
- Language: English
- Genre: Fantasy; Adventure
- Set in: United Kingdom
- Publisher: E.J. Arnold & Son (Later Arnold-Wheaton)
- Publication date: 1974 (Series A); 1976 (Series B); 1977 (Series C); 1980 (Series D); 1983 (Novellas)
- Publication place: United Kingdom
- Media type: Print

Tim and the Hidden People by Sheila K. McCullagh is a 1970s and 80's reading scheme, also known as Flightpath to Reading, originally devised for young children and intended for children with a reading age of eight-and-a-half to nine years. It consists of 32 books, each 32 pages long and illustrated by Pat Cook (1974-1979) and later Ray Mutimer (1980), written in a simple vocabulary. Four paperback "novella" books intended for older readers were also published in 1983 by Arnold-Wheaton.

Sheila McCullagh also wrote many other books, including Puddle Lane, The Village with Three Corners, Dragon Pirate Stories, and Griffin Pirate Stories.

== Plot ==
The Tim and the Hidden People books are about a boy called Tim who lives in a house in The Yard. The books begin with Tim finding a key which enables him to see the Hidden People, he befriends Tobias the black cat and has many adventures. Tobias has a son, Sebastian, who also has special power as one of the "strange ones" - those who are half "ordinary folk" and half "Hidden people".

== Reception ==
Writing for the Times Educational Supplement in July 1980, Anne Barnes described the Tim and the Hidden People stories as "quite adventurous" saying "Tim encounters enough mysteries to keep the reader in suspense to the end". Child Education magazine described the series as "excellent" in an August 1979 review.

The books were cited as an inspiration by the author Victoria Biggs, who used the "Hidden People" as an analogy for people with dyspraxia. Author and director Tom Harper also cited the series as an early inspiration. Child author Tom Percival also cited the books as an inspiration.

== Books ==
=== Series A ===
- A1. Tim and Tobias
- A2. All the Fun of the Fair
- A3. Tim Meets Captain Jory
- A4. Tim and the Smugglers
- A5. Tim and the Witches
- A6. The Highwayman
- A7. Magic in The Yard
- A8. The Key

=== Series B ===
- B1. The Return of the Key
- B2. Captain Jory Lends a Hand
- B3. The Stump People
- B4. Watchers in The Yard
- B5. Red for Danger
- B6. At the House of the Safe Witch
- B7. Tim in Hiding
- B8. On the night of the Full Moon

=== Series C ===
- C1. The Pool by the Whispering Trees
- C2. Tim in Trouble
- C3. On the Road to the North
- C4. Riding into Danger
- C5. Mandrake's Castle
- C6. Escape by Night
- C7. Three Fires on the Dark Tower
- C8. Tim Rides on the Ghost Bus

=== Series D ===
- D1. News from the North
- D2. The Cry in the Dark
- D3. The Shield Stone
- D4. The Storm over the Sea
- D5. The Cave of the Wind Witches
- D6. In Diaman's Cave
- D7. Danger on the Moor
- D8. At the Hill of the Stone Prisons

=== Reprints ===
Series A to D were reprinted in single novel form, with reduced quantity black and white images, but with expanded text.

- Tim and Tobias: Magic in the Wind (Series A)
- On the Night of the Full Moon (Series B)
- Three Fires on the Dark Tower (Series C)
- Wind Witches and Stone Men (Series D)

=== Novellas ===
(in chronological reading order)

- (1) Tim and the People of the Moonlight
- (2) The Wild Witches and the Talisman
- (3) Burglars in The Yard
- (4) Magic in the North
