= Mark Taylor (animation director) =

British animator

Arthur Mark Taylor (born March 1961 in Walton-on-Thames) is an animation director with the Bristol-based animation company A Productions. He created and directed the children's series Rubbish, King of the Jumble for ITV and was nominated for a BAFTA in 2002-03 for the BBC preschool animation series Boo! which he directed. He is also credited as animation director on the CBeebies show Tweenies, on the CITV show Jim Jam & Sunny and on the DK and Disney series Amazing Animals as well as the HarperCollins video of The Village with Three Corners.

He is also credited on the Aardman Animations film Chicken Run for his work on the story reel.

Mark directed on the preschool show Driver Dan's Story Train which is currently shown on CBeebies, ABC in Australia, and on PBS Sprout in the US. He has written scripts for show under his writing name Art Taylor, as well as voicing the character Red Vroom.

He directed the second season of 52 x 11 minutes CG animated show Numtums for CBeebies.

In 2020, he directed the animated Sesame Street special The Monster at the End of This Story which is streaming on HBO Max. He is also credited as one of the executive producers.
