= Puddle Lane =

British children's television series (1985–1989)

- Logo
- Developed by: Yorkshire Television
- Country of origin: England

Production
- Running time: 22 minutes

Original release
- Network: ITV (Yorkshire Television)
- Release: 3 October 1985 – 13 April 1989

Puddle Lane (or Tales from Puddle Lane) is a 1980s English pre-school children's television programme written by Rick Vanes with animated stories written by Sheila K. McCullagh, author of Tim and the Hidden People. A long series of early readers based on the stories was produced by Ladybird Books, also under the title Puddle Lane.

== TV programme ==
The programme was made by Yorkshire Television in Leeds for ITV and ran on from 1985 (as a replacement for the then-recently discontinued series Mooncat & Co.) until 1989. The main characters were the Magician (played by Neil Innes, who also composed music for the programme), and a Spell Dragon named Toby (voiced by Richard Robinson); the Magician told Toby stories by moving his finger around in a puddle (when using the interior set) and a bird bath (when using the exterior set) and producing images. He also had a cauldron inside and water barrel outside, both of which could talk. The stories he told were presented as animations, narrated by Kate Lee (who also played a minor character, Aunt Flo). The Magician lived in a large house at the end of Puddle Lane, hence the name of the programme.

In an interview in 2014, Neil Innes recalled his involvement with Puddle Lane:

...it wasn't really a plan [to work in children's television]. I find myself in life leaning against doors, then some of them fly open and I find myself falling into whatever is inside. After The Rutles film things got a bit bloody and ugly with publishers threatening to sue and I just thought "Sod it." So I wanted to get away from all that. Then a girl I was at art school with ended up being a producer at Yorkshire Television and she called me up and said would you fancy doing this reading scheme programme called Puddle Lane? And I said I think I would, I'm fed up with the music business, they can't take a joke, and so I did Puddle Lane.

== Transmission guide ==
- Series 1: 26 editions from 3 October 1985 – 1 May 1986
- Series 2: 26 editions from 16 October 1986 – 23 April 1987
- Series 3: 24 editions from 29 October 1987 – 21 April 1988
- Series 4: 26 editions from 6 October 1988 – 13 April 1989

== Books ==
A series of 54 books (plus two standalone volumes) was produced for Puddle Lane, published by Ladybird Books. The texts, based on the animated stories, were written by Sheila McCullagh. Illustrations for the books were provided by several different artists (Tony Morris, Gavin Rowe and others). There were five sets of books (with a different cover colour for each set), the first set (Stage 1) being the easiest to read and the last set (Stage 5) being the hardest. Since they were intended for children who are learning to read, the books with lower reading stages would present the text in two versions: the left page contained the full version, to be read aloud by the parent, while the right page contained a simplified version for the child. The books are currently out of print.

== Miscellany ==
Other Puddle Lane merchandise included audio tapes supplied for the books, jigsaw puzzles, dominoes, picture word cards, and several educational products: The Magician's Activity Book, The Griffle's Activity Book and Puddle Lane Fun Frieze.
