= Sheila K. McCullagh =

British children's writer (1920–2014)

- Sheila McCullagh circa 2014
- Born: Sheila Kathleen McCullagh (MBE); 3 December 1920; Surrey, England, United Kingdom
- Died: 7 July 2014 (aged 93); Bradford-on-Avon, Wiltshire, England, United Kingdom
- Occupation: Author
- Known for: Children's literature

Sheila Kathleen McCullagh MBE (3 December 1920 – 7 July 2014) was a British author of children's literature.

== Biography ==
McCullagh was born in Surrey. During her teens the family moved to Woodside House, just outside Felmersham on the road to Chellington. She wrote A Survey of the Parish of Felmersham in the year 1939-1940: it included samples of aggregate taken from the river and pressed flowers and crops collected from the land.

Her work was first published in the 1950s, when she was working as a lecturer at Leeds University. From 1958 to 1963 she taught at a teacher's college in London, Ontario before taking up writing full time. She went on to write many children's fantasy and educational books, including the Puddle Lane series. A television adaptation of the book series starred and featured original music by Neil Innes.

McCullagh spent many years lecturing in Canada and travelled widely, including to the Antarctic with Keith Shackleton and Peter Scott. She was a devout Anglican.

During her career she wrote over 300 titles. In 2006 she signed a deal with the publisher Mercury Junior to bring her books back into print.

In later life she moved to Cornwall and then Bath, where she lived with her partner Lois on the Royal Crescent for 20 years. She died on 7 July 2014 in Bradford-on-Avon, Wiltshire, aged 93.

== Books ==
- Dragon Pirate Stories
- Griffin Pirate Stories
- Puddle Lane (series)
- One Two Three and Away) (series)
- Tim and the Hidden People (series)
- Hummingbirds
- Seahawk
- Buccaneers (series)
- Adventures in Space
- Little Dragons
