= John Cunliffe (author) =

British writer and television presenter (1933–2018)

- Born: John Arthur Cunliffe; 16 June 1933; Colne, Lancashire, England
- Died: 20 September 2018 (aged 85); Ilkley, West Yorkshire, England
- Occupations: Author; librarian; teacher; television presenter
- Spouse: Sylvia Thompson (m. 1960)
- Children: 1
- Writing career
- Years active: 1964–2018
- Notable works: Postman Pat (1981–2003); Rosie and Jim (1990–1992)

John Arthur Cunliffe (16 June 1933 – 20 September 2018) was an English children's author and television presenter who created Postman Pat and presented the first two series of Rosie and Jim.

== Early life ==
John Arthur Cunliffe was born in Colne, Lancashire, on 16 June 1933, the only child of Nelly and Arthur Cunliffe. His father left the family when John was a baby. His great-uncle Herbert introduced him to the literary works of Charles Dickens and William Shakespeare, and let him use the microscope he kept in his front room. Cunliffe was very tall for his age, and bullied at school because of this. He attended Colne Grammar School, and later lived in Kendal, Westmorland, where the area's small towns and villages provided inspiration for his most famous character, Postman Pat. Greendale, where the series is set, is based on Longsleddale. Although Cunliffe wanted to become a writer when he left school, he was unsure how to go about this and between 1951 and 1973 was employed mainly as a librarian, including two years spent working for the British Council in Belgrade, Yugoslavia. During 1955 and 1956, he drove a van as a mobile librarian in rural Northumberland, and drew on this experience when creating Postman Pat.

After deciding to change career, in 1975 Cunliffe obtained a Certificate in Education from the Charlotte Mason College of Education in Ambleside, Cumbria, and taught at Castle Park Primary School in Kendal. He later worked for Manchester Education Committee as a visiting teacher/advisor on children's books. From 1981 to 1985 he was deputy head teacher at Crowcroft Park Primary School in Manchester, following which he had a part-time job at Manchester Teacher's Centre promoting the use of computers in primary schools.

== Writing career ==
=== Postman Pat ===
Cunliffe's first book, Farmer Barnes Buys a Pig, was published in 1964 through contact with children's author and publishing editor Philippa Pearce. In 1979, whilst teaching in Kendal, he applied unsuccessfully for a director's job on the BBC TV programme Play School, but at lunch following the interview was asked if he could write a 13-part series for children set in the countryside. This resulted in the creation of Postman Pat, which was animated and directed by Ivor Wood, and first broadcast on 16 September 1981. He created Pat and Greendale as an idyllic village where everyone was nice to each other, in contrast to the bullying he suffered while growing up. Following the success of Postman Pat, Cunliffe became something of a local celebrity, and had a room dedicated to him at Kendal's Museum of Lakeland Life. Until 1986, he received limited income from libraries through the Public Lending Right scheme, for which most of his books did not qualify being under 32 pages long. He was disappointed by some of the merchandising and tie-in books for Postman Pat, over which he had little control.

=== Rosie and Jim ===
Cunliffe's other well-known project, Rosie and Jim, was shown on ITV from 1990 to 2000. He presented the first 50 episodes, then wrote some of the episodes into books, also writing three new stories not in the TV show. His role as presenter was taken over by Pat Hutchins in 1995, and later by Neil Brewer in 1997.

=== Other work ===
In 2010, he released Ghosts, a children's story for the iPad. He was patron of the Ilkley Literature Festival.

== Personal life and death ==
Cunliffe married Sylvia May Thompson in 1960, and the couple had one son, Julian Edward. They lived at 32 Greenside in Kendal when they first came to the Lake District. Cunliffe was a keen fan of Alfred Wainwright, another Kendal resident, and annotated his copies of Wainwright's books after completing particular walks. Despite the success of Postman Pat, when interviewed in 1987, Cunliffe and his wife were still living in their "modest semi-detached house" in the Manchester suburb of Withington, and for two and a half days a week he was working as an advisor to City of Manchester Education Committee on the use of computers in schools.

Cunliffe died of cardiopulmanory failure in Ilkley on 20 September 2018, at the age of 85. His death was first announced in the local newspaper, the Ilkley Gazette, which said he "left his Ilkley home in a deluge of rain [...] never to return".

== Bibliography ==
=== Farmer Barnes ===
- Farmer Barnes Buys a Pig (1964) (Note: Illustrated by Carol Barker.)
- Farmer Barnes and Bluebell (1966)
- Farmer Barnes at the County Show (1969) (Note: Illustrated by Jill McDonald.)
- Farmer Barnes and the Goats (1971)
- Farmer Barnes Goes Fishing (1972)
- Farmer Barnes and the Snow Picnic (1974) (Note: Illustrated by Joan Hickson.)
- Farmer Barnes and the Harvest Doll (1977)
- Farmer Barnes Fells a Tree (1977)
- Farmer Barnes' Guy Fawkes Day (1978)

=== Rosie and Jim ===
- Rosie and Jim and the Water Wizard (1991)
- Rosie and Jim and the Rainbow (1991)
- Rosie and Jim the Water Wizard the Rainbow (1991)
- Rosie and Jim and the Man in the Wind (1992)
- 50 One-minute Stories (1992)
- Rosie and Jim and the Drink of Milk (1992)
- Round the Year with Rosie and Jim (1992)
- Rosie and Jim and the Glassblowers (1993)
- A Family for Duck (1993)
- A Day at the Seaside(1993)
- Rosie and Jim and the Snowman (1993)
- Jim Gets Lost (1993)
- Rosie and Jim's Apple, Banana, Carrot Alphabet Book (1993)
- Rosie and Jim and the Magic Sausages (1994)
- Round the Year with Rosie and Jim Part Two: Spring and Summer (1994)
- Time to Play (1995)

=== Other books ===
==== Fiction ====
- The Adventures of Lord Pip (1970) (Note: Illustrated by Robert Hale.)
- Riddles & Rhymes & Rigmaroles (1971) (Note: Illustrated by Alexy Pendle.)
- The Giant Who Stole the World (1971) (Note: Illustrated by Faith Jaques.)
- The Giant Who Swallowed the Wind (1972)
- Giant Kippernose and Other Stories (1972) (Note: Illustrated by Fritz Wegner.)
- The Great Dragon Competition and Other Stories (1973)
- Small Monkey Tales (1974) (Note: Illustrated by Gerry Downes.)
- The Farmer, the Rooks and the Cherry Tree (1975) (Note: Illustrated by Prudence Seward.)
- Giant Brog and the Motorway (1976)
- Mr Gosling and the Runaway Chair (1978) (Note: Illustrated by William Stobbs.)
- Mr Gosling and the Great Art Robbery (1979)
- Our Sam: The Daftest Dog in the World (1980)
- Standing on a Strawberry (1987) (Note: Illustrated by David Parkins.)
  Poetry anthology.
- Fog Lane School and the Great Racing Car Disaster (1988) (Note: Illustrated by Andrew Tiffin.)
- The Minister's Cat (1990)
- John Cunliffe's Fizzy Whizzy Poetry Book (1995)
- The Weather Baby (2000) (Note: Illustrated by Joan Hickson and John Lee)

==== Non-fiction ====
- Play Logo: An Introduction to Computing for Parents and Children (1984)

== VHS videos and DVDs ==
- My Favourite Nursery Rhymes
