= Pat Hutchins =

English children's writer and illustrator (1942–2017)

- Hutchins in 2017
- Born: Patricia Evelyn Hutchins; 18 June 1942; Yorkshire, England
- Died: 8 November 2017 (aged 75); London, England
- Occupations: Author, broadcaster, illustrator
- Spouse: Laurence Hutchins
- Children: 2
- Writing career
- Notable works: Rosie and Jim (1994–1996); Titch (1997–2001)

Patricia Evelyn Hutchins (18 June 1942 – 8 November 2017) was an English illustrator, writer of children's books, and broadcaster. She won the 1974 Kate Greenaway Medal from the Library Association for her book The Wind Blew. On screen, she was best known as 'Loopy-Lobes' the second owner of the "Ragdoll boat" in the long-running children's series Rosie and Jim.

Hutchins was married to illustrator Laurence Hutchins, with whom she had two children. He provided the illustrations for some of her books for early readers.

== Biography ==
Hutchins was born 18 June 1942 in Yorkshire, the sixth of seven children. She won a scholarship to Darlington School of Art in 1958, continued studying illustration at Leeds College of Art in 1960, and graduated in 1962. She worked for an advertising agency in London to 1966 when she married Laurence Hutchins and moved to New York City for two years. There she worked on writing and illustrating her first picture book, Rosie's Walk, published in 1968 by The Bodley Head and Macmillan US. In the United States, it was a runner-up for the Boston Globe–Horn Book Award and the librarians named it a 1968 ALA Notable Book. It remains her work most widely catalogued by WorldCat participating libraries. Titch and its sequels were noted for drawing on Hutchins' family life for its depiction of a sibling relationship.

Pat Hutchins wrote novels for early readers, some illustrated by husband Laurence, and more than two dozen picture books. Beside winning the 1974 Greenaway Medal, she was a commended runner up for One-Eyed Jack (1979), another book she wrote and illustrated. (Note: Today the Greenaway Medal shortlist typically comprises eight books. According to CCSU, some runners up through 2002 were Commended (from 1959) or Highly Commended (from 1974). There were 99 commendations of both kinds in 44 years, including Hutchins and Quentin Blake (highly commended) for 1979.)

In 1994، Hutchins took over from John Cunliffe as the presenter of the British children's television series, Rosie and Jim. She played the role of an artistic narrowboat owner and illustrator, referred to as Loopy Lobes by the two puppet characters because of the large and elaborate earrings she wore during her tenure. Hutchins appeared in 45 episodes over two series and subsequently illustrated books for the franchise. Her role was later taken over by musician Neil Brewer in 1996.

Between 1997 and 2001 the Titch series of books were made into a stop motion television programme for young children. Three complete series were produced by "Hutchins Film Company" and broadcast on Children's ITV. According to Hutchins, each episode took two weeks to produce. It was costly and the process was lengthy, hence the series ending after its third run. The series later re-aired on the Tiny Living strand from 2001 until 2005 and then Channel Five's Milkshake! programme thread from 2005 until 2006. VHS tapes and DVDs were produced during its run.

Hutchins died from cancer on 8 November 2017, aged 75.

== Selected works ==
=== Written and illustrated by Pat Hutchins ===
Hutchins wrote and illustrated about fifty books.

- Rosie's Walk (The Bodley Head, 1968)
- Tom and Sam (Bodley, 1968)
- The Surprise Party (Macmillan, 1969)
- Clocks and More Clocks (Simon & Schuster, 1970)
- Changes, Changes (Bodley, 1971)
- Titch (Bodley, 1971)
- Good Night, Owl! (Macmillan US, 1972; Bodley, 1973)
- The Wind Blew (Bodley, 1974) – Greenaway Medal winner
- The Silver Christmas Tree (Bodley, 1974)
- Don't Forget the Bacon! (Bodley, 1976)
- Happy Birthday, Sam (Bodley, 1978)
- The Best Train Set Ever (Bodley, 1978)
- One-Eyed Jake (Bodley, 1979) – Commended for the Greenaway
- The Tale of Thomas Mead (Bodley, 1980)
- 1 Hunter (Bodley, 1982)
- King Henry's Palace (Bodley, 1983)
- You'll Soon Grow into Them, Titch (Bodley, 1983)
- The Very Worst Monster (Bodley, 1985)
- The Doorbell Rang (Julia MacRae Books 1986)
- Where's the Baby? (Bodley, 1988)
- Which Witch is Which? (MacRae, 1989)
- What Game Shall We Play? (MacRae, 1990)
- Tidy Titch (MacRae, 1991)
- Silly Billy (MacRae, 1992)
- My Best Friend (MacRae, 1993)
- Little Pink Pig (MacRae, 1994)
- Three-Star Billy (MacRae, 1994)
- Titch and Daisy (MacRae, 1996)
- Shrinking Mouse (Greenwillow Books, 1997; Bodley, 1998)
- It's Bedtime, Titch (Red Fox, 1998)
- It's Christmas, Titch (Red Fox, 1998)
- Titch Dresses Up (Red Fox, 1998)
- Titch's Snowy Day (Red Fox, 1998)
- Gardener Titch (Red Fox, 1999)
- Tidy Up Titch (Red Fox, 1999)
- Titch and the Baby (Red Fox, 1999)
- Titch and the Picnic (Red Fox, 1999)
- It's MY Birthday! (Greenwillow, 1999; Bodley, 2000)
- Titch Out and About (Red Fox, 2000)
- Titch's ABC (Red Fox, 2000)
- It's Bathtime, Titch (Red Fox, 2000)
- Sticky Titch (Red Fox, 2000)
- Titch's Windy Day (Red Fox, 2000)
- Ten Red Apples (Bodley, 2000)
- We're Going on a Picnic! (Bodley, 2002)
- There's Only One of Me! (HarperCollins, 2003)
- Don't Get Lost! (HarperCollins, 2004)
- Bumpety Bump! (HarperCollins, 2006)
- Barn Dance! (HarperCollins, 2007)
- Where, Oh Where, Is Rosie's Chick? (Hodder, 2015)

=== Illustrated by Laurence Hutchins ===
These books were all written by Pat Hutchins, illustrated by Laurence Hutchins, and published by The Bodley Head (except for the last one).

- The House that Sailed Away (Greenwillow, 1975; Bodley, 1976)
- Follow That Bus! (Bodley, 1977)
- The Mona Lisa Mystery (Bodley, 1981)
- The Curse of the Egyptian Mummy (Bodley, 1983)
- Rats! (Bodley, 1989)
- I'm the King of the Castle (Oberon Books, 2005)

== VHS videos and DVDs ==
- My Favourite Nursery Rhymes
- Rosie and Jim – Gingerbread Man and Other Stories
- Rosie and Jim – Duck Gets Lost and Other Stories
- Rosie and Jim – Lovely Bananas and Other Stories
- Rosie and Jim – Bouncy Castles and Other Stories
- Rosie and Jim – The Disappearing Sausages and Other Stories
- Rosie and Jim – Soapy Duck and Other Stories
- Rosie and Jim – On Safari
- Rosie and Jim – Acrobats
- My Big Rosie and Jim – Chugging Along on the Old Ragdoll
- Rosie and Jim – Splish Splash Splosh (Bumper Special)
