= Rosie and Jim =

British children's television show

- Jim (left) and Rosie (right)
- Created by: Anne Wood; Robin Stevens
- Presented by: John Cunliffe (Series 1–2); Pat Hutchins (Series 3–4); Neil Brewer (Series 5–8)
- Starring: Rebecca Nagan; Robin Stevens
- Music by: Andrew McCrorie-Shand; Robert Hartley (series 6)
- Country of origin: United Kingdom
- Original language: English
- No. of series: 8
- No. of episodes: 175

Production
- Running time: 15 minutes (Series 1–2); 11 minutes (Series 3–8)
- Production companies: Ragdoll Productions; Central Independent Television (Series 1–6)

Original release
- Network: ITV (Children's ITV)
- Release: 3 September 1990 – 16 May 2000

Related
- Teletubbies; Brum

Rosie and Jim (sometimes written as Rosie & Jim) is a British children's television programme which was produced by Ragdoll Productions and aired on the Children's ITV block on ITV from 3 September 1990 to 16 May 2000. The programme was then repeated periodically on CITV until 23 July 2004.

== Story ==
Rosie and Jim are two rag dolls who live aboard a narrowboat called the Ragdoll. There, they sit with a concertina on their lap and come alive when no one is looking to explore the world that they pass by on rivers and canals across England. They learn to experience things by following the Ragdoll's owner on his or her adventures, and secretly joining in with them. Usually, they end up causing trouble, but they are never detected because no adult ever sees them off the boat or come to life.

== Characters ==
=== Rosie ===
Rosie (puppeteered and voiced by Rebecca Nagan) is the female rag doll. During their adventures, she carries a bag that has her name written on it. She wears a yellow dress, red stockings, green shoes, brown earrings and necklace, and has long shaggy black hair tied in a red ribbon. She and Jim often refer to the boat driver as "Fizzgog" (John Cunliffe), "Loopy Lobes" (or just "loopy"; Pat Hutchins) and "Tootle" (Neil Brewer). She sometimes calls Jim "Noggin". She was given a darker skin colour from series 2.

=== Jim ===
Jim (puppeteered and voiced by Robin Stevens) is the male rag doll. In their adventures, he can be seen carrying a notebook, in which he sometimes draws things that he has seen. He has short red hair and wears light brown trousers, a shirt with a red scarf, a white-with-red-stripes sock, brown boots and a brown waistcoat. The shade of his skin has changed slightly throughout the series.

=== Duck ===
Duck (also voiced by Robin Stevens) is an animatronic wooden model of a duck, who sits on top of the Ragdoll boat. He does not talk but can be heard quacking and flapping his wings when there are no humans around to let both Rosie and Jim know that the coast is clear. In some episodes, either Rosie or Jim give him a kiss. He is the only character to directly interact with all three presenters (as only John Cunliffe directly addressed Rosie and Jim regularly, and Pat Hutchins only did so once).

=== Narrowboat owners ===
Rosie and Jim's home is the narrowboat Ragdoll. Throughout its run the boat was acquired by three owners, each one playing a role according to their real-life profession.

- John "Fizzgog" Cunliffe: 1990–1992, 50 episodes

An author who writes stories about Rosie and Jim based upon his own everyday outings. Cunliffe is the only presenter to break the fourth wall, delivering pieces to the camera and narration throughout every episode, which ended with a self-penned short cutout animated story done by Alan Rogers and Peter Lang (creators of Pigeon Street). He is the only presenter to directly address Rosie and Jim on-screen.

- Pat "Loopy Lobes" Hutchins: 1995–1996, 45 episodes

An illustrator who creates pictures, gathering ideas from her adventures. Each episode would start with Pat finishing a drawing of Rosie and Jim and end with an illustration, again by Pat, based upon the episode. At the end of each episode, Duck would be hidden in the picture, with Rosie and Jim trying to find him. Pat also illustrated the books and artwork for the video releases between 1995 and 1996. Hutchins is the only female presenter of the series.

- Neil "Tootle" Brewer: 1997–2000, 80 episodes

A singer and musician who plays the harmonica and the concertina. Neil would begin each episode looking for his harmonica followed by Rosie and Jim talking about and introducing him. Brewer would often end each episode with a song played on his concertina; prompted by Rosie and Jim who would leave the instrument for him to play, next to Duck. At the end of each episode, the rag dolls would often join in with the song, unknown to Neil. Brewer became the longest-serving owner of the boat and was the only one to star in a live theatre tour of the show in 1999 and 2000. Brewer is the only presenter to have starred in more than 2 series. He is also the last surviving presenter, following the death of Pat Hutchins in November 2017, and that of John Cunliffe in September 2018.

Following the boat's redundancy from Ragdoll Productions, it is no longer on display to the public.

== Episodes ==
=== Series 1 (1990–1991) – John Cunliffe ===
- 1. "Locks" – 3 September 1990 – John plans to take the Ragdoll up the canal to Dudley, but in order to do so he has to navigate a series of locks.
- 2. "Painting" – 10 September 1990 – Tree branches scrape against the Ragdoll, scratching off its smart paint. So John goes out to the shops to buy some paint to make his boat look nice and shiny again. Rosie and Jim do some painting of their own, and they learn about mixing colours together to make even more colours.
- 3. "Supermarket" – 17 September 1990 – John is out of groceries, so he makes a trip to Sainsbury's to purchase what he needs. However, the two rag dolls have something else on their minds.
- 4. "Tunnel" – 24 September 1990 – Whilst John is on his travels, he goes inside a tunnel leaving the two rag dolls to believe that pure darkness can be frightening to travel through.
- 5. "Horse Towing" – 1 October 1990 – Whilst attempting to travel to Dudley, the Ragdoll's tiller comes apart in John's hand, meaning he has to walk to a nearby stable so a horse can tow the boat to somewhere he can get it fixed.
- 6. "Glass" – 8 October 1990 – John is very curious to know how glass is made, so he goes to a factory to see what ingredients are put together to make glass, sand being the main one. Rosie and Jim follow him there, and play in the sandpit making their own boat out of sand with marble glass windows.
- 7. "Boat Building" – 15 October 1990 – John visits Black Country Narrow Boats, the boatyard that built the Ragdoll, where Rosie and Jim try making their own boats out of paper and foil.
- 8. "Washing" – 22 October 1990 – It's a rainy day on the Ragdoll, and John's in need of washing his clothes, so he sets out to a local launderette to get them clean once again. Rosie and Jim have some dirty washing too, but they also have something else in mind.
- 9. "Coal" – 29 October 1990 – It is quite cold on the Ragdoll, and John is running out of coal for his furnace to keep him and Rosie and Jim warm, so he and Rosie and Jim set out to a coal mine to see where exactly coal comes from.
- 10. "Clipping" – 5 November 1990 – As John sails down the canal, he notices lots of different things being cut, so he takes a walk and goes to a farm to see some sheep having their wool sheared off. Later on, John does some trimming of his own by giving his beard a snip. Rosie and Jim join in by taking some sheep wool and begin pretending to shear it off themselves.
- 11. "Falcons" – 12 November 1990 – John is looking for an idea for a story, so he sails down the canal to a falcon country park to see all kinds of different birds. Rosie and Jim follow him, and watch the demonstrations of the falcons.
- 12. "Woollen Mill" – 19 November 1990 – John's woolly jumper is beginning to wear out, so he sets off to a mill to retrieve some wool to knit a new jumper. Meanwhile, Jim mistakes a sheep for a dragon, and is frightened, but soon learns that sheep are harmless. Then, Rosie and Jim finally get some coloured wool of their own.
- 13. "Bread" – 26 November 1990 – John sets out to a wheat field to find out how bread is made. He then sees a windmill, and is shown how wheat is turned into bread. Rosie and Jim get up to their old tricks and fool around with John when he isn't looking.
- 14. "Shopping" – 3 December 1990 – John sets out to the shops to buy some food and drink for a picnic. Rosie and Jim are hungry and want to have a picnic too, so they add their own items to John's shopping list without him knowing. Bearing in mind that John doesn't even like the items that Rosie and Jim added, they're afraid that John is going to be upset. However, John isn't overly upset after all, as he sees a family having a barbecue and gives them Rosie and Jim's items.
- 15. "Weaving" – 10 December 1990 – John thinks the blanket on his bed is starting to wear out, so he decides to go and get a new one. Rosie and Jim play with his blanket, but they play too rough, and put large holes in it. So John pays a visit to the weavers workshop to see how blankets are made from scratch.
- 16. "Ferry" – 17 December 1990 – John goes off to Hampton to see a ferry. When Rosie and Jim see a boat that's going to the same place as the Ragdoll, they fear that it's going to cause a crash, but of course, it doesn't. John hops aboard a ferry to be transported from one path to another that has the river as a collision.
- 17. "Milking (a.k.a "Milk")" – 7 January 1991 – John travels to a farm to see how the milk we drink every day is made.
- 18. "Sailing" – 14 January 1991 – John travels to Tewkesbury Marina to see some sailing boats and get some ideas for a story about Rosie and Jim
- 19. "Steam" – 21 January 1991 – While watching steam boats on the River Severn, John runs the Ragdoll aground in a mud bank needing help from another steam boat.
- 20. "Abbey" – 28 January 1991 – John visits Tewkesbury Abbey and explores the inside of the church.
- 21. "Breakdown" – 4 February 1991 – It's time for John to take out the rubbish from the boat, so he attempts to catch up with the bin-man and takes the rubbish to the tip so it can be broken down and recycled.
- 22. "Pottery" – 11 February 1991 – John travels to visit a pottery at Elmley Castle near Pershore in Worcestershire.
- 23. "Fairground" – 18 February 1991 – John travels along the River Severn through Worcester to Stourport to ride the dragon at the Shipley Amusements Park.
- 24. "Letters" – 25 February 1991 – John travels to Worcester to visit the Worcester Post and Sorting Office
- 25. "Finding the Way" – 4 March 1991 – John travels along the River Severn through Worcester, and then goes to Ragley Hall in Alcester to a maze.

=== Series 2 (1991–1992) – John Cunliffe ===
- 26. "Automata" – 30 September 1991 – John visits Ashorne Hall to see some musical instruments that play by themselves.
- 27. "Butterflies" – 7 October 1991 – John visits Stratford Butterfly Farm in Stratford-upon-Avon.
- 28. "Houses" – 14 October 1991 – John Visits Charlecote House.
- 29. "Hair" – 21 October 1991 – John visits Renoir Hair Salon in Birmingham.
- 30. "School" – 28 October 1991 – John visits Reaside Nursery School in Birmingham.
- 31. "Bricks" – 4 November 1991 – John visits Northcot Brick Ltd in Blockley.
- 32. "Small Animals" – 11 November 1991 – John visits Evesham in Stratford-upon-Avon to see some small animals at Twyford Country Centre.
- 33. "Hats" – 18 November 1991 – John visits The Rag Market in Birmingham.
- 34. "Hospital" – 25 November 1991 – John visits Birmingham Children's Hospital.
- 35. "Boat Painting" – 2 December 1991 – John visits The National Waterways Museum in Gloucester.
- 36. "Sheepdog" – 9 December 1991 – John visits Netherly Farm in Mathon to see a sheepdog at work.
- 37. "Waterworks" – 16 December 1991 – John visits Severn Trent Water.
- 38. "Blacksmith" – 6 January 1992 – John visits The National Waterways Museum in Gloucester for a second time.
- 39. "Library" – 13 January 1992 – John visits The Children's Library in Sutton Coldfield.
- 40. "Dredging" – 20 January 1992 – John visits a bucket dredger digging mud from a river.
- 41. "Rope" – 27 January 1992 – John visits Bewdley to get a new rope for The Ragdoll Boat.
- 42. "Trees" – 3 February 1992 – John accidentally breaks a plank of wood and decides to get a new one. He visits a timber yard to see how trees get turned into planks of wood.
- 43. "Shoes" – 10 February 1992 – John visits Worcester to buy some shoes from Blunts Shoes.
- 44. "Brass" – 17 February 1992 – John visits the Bewdley Museum to see how a brass windlass is made while Rosie and Jim try to return his jelly to him.
- 45. "Flying" – 24 February 1992 – John visits Bidford-on-Avon to learn to fly in a plane at Avon Soaring Centre.
- 46. "Coracle" – 2 March 1992 – John visits the Bewdley Museum to see how a coracle is made after seeing some on the River Severn.
- 47. "Puppet Show" – 9 March 1992 – John visits the Swan Theatre in Stratford-upon-Avon to see a puppet show performed by Major Mustard.
- 48. "Shire Horses" – 16 March 1992 – John visits Stratford-upon-Avon to visit the Stratford Shire Horse Centre.
- 49. "Eggs" – 23 March 1992 – John visits A. E. Beckett and Sons at Heath Farm in Wythall to see where eggs come from.
- 50. "Boat Festival" – 30 March 1992 – John visits the National Waterways Festival.

=== Series 3 (1995) – Pat Hutchins ===
- 51. "Radio Station" – 6 January 1995 – Pat Hutchins visits the BBC CWR radio studios in Coventry.
- 52. "Babies" – 13 January 1995 – Pat visits Hillfields Nursery Centre.
- 53. "Steam Train" – 20 January 1995 – Pat visits the Battlefield Line Railway.
- 54. "Barn Owl" – 27 January 1995 – Pat notices a barn owl flying over the canal and meets its owner.
- 55. "Gingerbread Man" – 3 February 1995 – Pat visits Coggans Bakery in Nuneaton to see how gingerbread men are made.
- 56. "Musical Instruments" – 10 February 1995 – Pat visits Leicester to meet Unity Brass.
- 57. "Flower Baskets" – 17 February 1995 – Pat visits Mill Lane Nurseries in Evesham.
- 58. "Duck Gets Lost" – 24 February 1995 – Pat leaves Duck on the canal side while cleaning the roof of the Ragdoll and accidentally leaves him behind.
- 59. "Ten Pin Bowling" – 3 March 1995 – Pat visits a bowling alley in Coventry.
- 60. "Sneezes" – 10 March 1995 – Pat visits The Uppingham Road Health Centre in Leicester when she has a cold.
- 61. "Digging For Potatoes" – 17 March 1995 – Pat notices someone digging up potatoes in his garden and offers to help.
- 62. "Pony Riding" – 24 March 1995 – Pat comes across a gymkhana and stops to watch.
- 63. "Lovely Bananas" – 31 March 1995 – Pat notices a family with fruit and stops to buy food at a street market in North Warwickshire.
- 64. "Splish Splash Splosh" – 7 April 1995 – Pat visits Longford Park Primary School where the pupils draw pictures for her.
- 65. "Down on the Farm" – 21 April 1995 – Pat visits Gorse Hill City Farm in Leicester.
- 66. "The Hat Factory" – 28 April 1995 – Pat visits Wilson & Stafford's hat factory and sees how hats are made.
- 67. "The Disappearing Sausages" – 5 May 1995 – Pat comes across a family with suitcases for a boating holiday. Rosie and Jim want to go on a boating holiday too and start packing their things for the holiday. Jim wants to pack some sausages but Rosie refuses. After they finish packing, they accidentally throw their suitcase onto another boat and their suitcase gets mixed up with someone else's suitcase.
- 68. "Soapy Duck" – 12 May 1995 – The Ragdoll and Duck get dirty from the road bridge above and Pat loses her bar of soap so she visits The Standard Soap Company's factory nearby to get a new one, and finds out how soap is made.
- 69. "Bouncy Castles" – 19 May 1995 – Pat notices a bouncy castle and visits Gaz Inflatables which makes them.
- 70. "A Special Dance" – 26 May 1995 – Pat notices the Leicester Morris Men group on their way to Abbey Primary School and watches them dance there.
- 71. "Flood on the Boat" – 9 June 1995 – Rosie and Jim overhear Pat saying she is thirsty and get her a glass of water. However, Rosie forgets to turn off the tap and floods the boat. Fearing a hole in the boat, Pat has the Ragdoll lifted out of the water for inspection by Rose Narrow Boats.
- 72. "The Shoemaker" – 16 June 1995 – Pat notices a child with shoes she likes, so she visits Gerry's Shoe Repairs to have some made especially for her.
- 73. "Scarecrow" – 23 June 1995 – Pat meets two children building a scarecrow and offers to join them with a donation of her old clothes.
- 74. "Roller Skating" – 30 June 1995 – Pat comes along with friends to Coventry Sports Centre to watch their daughter, Jade, roller skating.
- 75. "Stars at Night" – 7 July 1995 – As dusk falls, Pat notices a family stargazing and joins them before going to bed back on the Ragdoll.

=== Series 4 (1996) – Pat Hutchins ===
- 76. "Acrobats" – 5 January 1996 – Pat Visits the Chinese State Circus in Stratford-upon-Avon.
- 77. "Earrings" – 12 January 1996 – Pat accidentally drops an earring into the water and has a new one made especially for her at a jewellers.
- 78. "The Best Boat in the World" – 19 January 1996 – Pat visits Stratford-upon-Avon to have a ride in a gondola.
- 79. "Mouse on the Boat" – 26 January 1996 – Rosie and Jim, along with Pat, find a mouse running around the Ragdoll. Thinking it would not be happy living on the boat, Pat catches it and tries to find it a new home.
- 80. "Floating Restaurant" – 2 February 1996 – Pat sees some friends aboard a restaurant boat, so she dresses up to join them. Meanwhile, Rosie tries to help the waiter and Jim tries to eat the ice cream when he is hungry.
- 81. "On Safari" – 9 February 1996 – Pat visits Woburn Safari Park in Bedfordshire and rides the minibus to see the animals.
- 82. "Exercise" – 16 February 1996 – Pat visits The Metropolitan Club to do some exercise.
- 83. "Little Lost Kitten" – 23 February 1996 – Pat finds a lost kitten and takes it back to a family at Barton Dovecote Leisure.
- 84. "Stripes" – 1 March 1996 – Pat visits Woburn Safari Park a second time to get ideas for a drawing. She sees the tigers and Jim's drawing of stripy clothes.
- 85. "Magical Lights" – 8 March 1996 – Pat has been invited by the Lord Mayor of the town to help turn on the Christmas lights in Stratford-upon-Avon.
- 86. "Making Pizza" – 28 June 1996 – Pat visits Gourmet Pizza Company in Oxford.
- 87. "Shop Window" – 5 July 1996 – Pat visits Oxford to help take a mannequin to a shop and dress it.
- 88. "Visiting the Vet" – 12 July 1996 – Pat gives two friends a lift on the Ragdoll to take their pet rabbit to the vet for a health check.
- 89. "Bus Ride" – 19 July 1996 – Pat sees the Oxford open-top tour bus and goes for a ride on it.
- 90. "Dog Training" – 26 July 1996 – Pat sees a dog by the river and meets the owners who are taking her to agility training at the Wallingford Dog Training Club.
- 91. "Winning the Race" – 2 August 1996 – Pat comes across her real-life husband Laurence Hutchins who invites her to a café by the river. He offers to give her a lift in his car, but she declines. Rosie and Jim dislike his remark of the Ragdoll being slow and decide to race him in the boat.
- 92. "The Milkman" – 9 August 1996 – Pat visits the milkman to buy milk and offers to help with his round.
- 93. "Ballroom Dancing" – 16 August 1996 – Pat hears music that makes her want to dance and comes across a ballroom dancing session.
- 94. "The Umbrella Factory" – 23 August 1996 – It is raining and Pat's umbrella has a hole in it so she visits Stephens Umbrellas Limited to see how they are made.
- 95. "Sleepy Baby" – 30 August 1996 – Pat comes across some busy friends, so she offers to look after their baby and help him go to sleep.

=== Series 5 (1997) – Neil Brewer ===
- 96. "Harmonica" – 10 January 1997 – Neil Brewer's harmonica slips out of his hand and falls into the children's water bowl. When he gets it back, it no longer works as well as it used to. He then goes to Mickleburgh Music Shop and tries some other instruments before deciding on a new harmonica.
- 97. "Spring Cleaning" – 17 January 1997 – Neil gives the Ragdoll a spring clean but has to deal with clutter before he goes anywhere.
- 98. "Water Skiing" – 24 January 1997 – Neil decides to try water skiing, and so do Rosie and Jim.
- 99. "Cake" – 31 January 1997 – Some children on another boat are devastated when their birthday cake falls into the water, so Neil decides to decorate a cake for them while Rosie and Jim secretly help him.
- 100. "Sing Song" – 7 February 1997 – Neil comes across the Avon Cub Scouts & Brownie Guides singing by a campfire and joins in.
- 101. "Pony And Trap" – 14 February 1997 – Neil meets a friend riding a pony and trap. She agrees to let him ride it with her and they go around the Gordano Valley Riding Stables' course.
- 102. "Disappearing Duck" – 21 February 1997 – Rosie and Jim notice some ducks in the canal and their Duck wants to meet them, so they take him as they follow Neil to visit a place with more ducks.
- 103. "Football" – 28 February 1997 – Neil visits Bristol City F.C. to watch the 1996 Gloucestershire Cup match versus Bristol Rovers F.C..
- 104. "Chimney Sweep" – 7 March 1997 – Neil notices a chimney sweep who lets him watch him sweep another chimney.
- 105. "Windy Day" – 14 March 1997 – Neil's hat blows off in the wind, so Rosie and Jim chase after it for him.
- 106. "A New Chair" – 21 March 1997 – Rosie and Jim accidentally break one of the chairs on the Ragdoll, so they follow Neil to the Woodland Workshop to learn how to make a chair.
- 107. "A Duck Kite" – 4 April 1997 – Neil sees some children flying kites and wants to do so himself, so he visits a workshop to have one made for him.
- 108. "A Jacket For Neil" – 11 April 1997 – Neil visits a tailor shop to get a new jacket, but with help from Rosie and Jim up to their tricks behind the scenes.
- 109. "Up and Away" – 18 April 1997 – Neil visits the 1996 Bristol International Balloon Festival to see the hot air balloons. (With a cameo of Sonic the Hedgehog)
- 110. "Bike Ride" – 25 April 1997 – Neil visits The Lock Inn Bike Hire Centre to ride on a tricycle.
- 111. "Molly The Parrot" – 9 May 1997 – Neil visits Rode Bird Gardens where he meets a talking parrot.
- 112. "Summer Fun" – 16 May 1997 – Neil sees some children playing with sand and then walks to a beach by the sea.
- 113. "Merry-Go-Round" – 23 May 1997 – Neil visits Brean Leisure Park to ride on a merry-go-round.
- 114. "Bouncy Mattress" – 30 May 1997 – Rosie and Jim accidentally break Neil's mattress so he goes to buy a new one from Furnitureland in Bristol.
- 115. "Theatre" – 6 June 1997 – Neil visits the Bristol Old Vic Theatre Royal to watch a play.

=== Series 6 (1998) – Neil Brewer ===
- 116. "Oodles Of Noodles" – 5 January 1998 – Neil feels hungry, so he goes to a Chinese restaurant where he sees noodles being made.
- 117. "Feeding the Pigeons" – 9 January 1998 – Neil visits Trafalgar Square in London to meet some pigeons.
- 118. "Camping" – 12 January 1998 – Neil feels like camping so he sets up his old tent by the Ragdoll.
- 119. "Big Ben Boing" – 16 January 1998 – Neil visits Big Ben in Westminster, London.
- 120. "Golf" – 19 January 1998 – Neil plays golf with Neil Jordan at Sudbury Golf Course.
- 121. "Tower of London" – 23 January 1998 – Neil visits the Tower of London
- 122. "Newspaper" – 26 January 1998
- 123. "Waterslide" – 30 January 1998 – Neil, with Rosie and Jim secretly following, has fun riding the slides at an indoor water park.
- 124. "Fish Face" – 2 February 1998 – Neil visits the London Aquarium to see some fish and other sea creatures.
- 125. "Stilts" – 6 February 1998 – Neil sees some children walking on stilts with their instructor and joins them with Rosie and Jim secretly joining in.
- 126. "Do It Yourself" – 9 February 1998 – Neil turns to DIY after a cabinet on the Ragdoll falls apart.
- 127. "Tomato Ketchup" – 13 February 1998 – Neil visits a tomato ketchup factory to see how ketchup is made.
- 128. "Lullaby" – 16 February 1998
- 129. "Floating Duck" – 20 February 1998 – Duck finds himself floating away on some driftwood on the River Thames when Rosie and Jim accidentally push him off the boat.
- 130. "Raising the Road" – 23 February 1998 – Neil visits Tower Bridge in London to see how it works.
- 131. "Music Boat" – 27 February 1998 – Neil gives the Dulwich Junior Brass Band a lift on the boat where they play Rosie and Jim's theme tune.
- 132. "Recording Studio" – 2 March 1998 – Neil records a new song to listen to on the boat, with composer Andrew McCrorie-Shand.
- 133. "One Man Band" – 6 March 1998 – A one-man-band busker loses his drum when it falls into the canal so Rosie and Jim secretly help him get it back.
- 134. "Chinese Lion Dance" – 9 March 1998 – Neil is invited to take part in a lion dance at London's Chinatown to celebrate Chinese New Year.
- 135. "Music Party" – 13 March 1998 – Neil feels lonely, despite it being his birthday, so Rosie and Jim make invitations to send to guests who Neil met earlier in the series, to a party at the Ragdoll.

(The episodes "Newspaper" and "Lullaby" have not been readily available in any format since their initial broadcasts in 1998.)

=== Series 7 (1999) – Neil Brewer ===
- 136. "Sticky Honey" – 5 January 1999 – Neil follows a bee to a honey farm to see how honey is made.
- 137. "Anchor and Chain" – 12 January 1999 – Neil has to replace the Ragdoll boat's anchor and chain after he loses it in a lake, and goes to see how the chain is made.
- 138. "Shining Armour" – 19 January 1999 – Neil sees a knight in shining armour riding along the canal bank, who suddenly drops his plume. He meets up with the knight at Belvoir Castle and hands his plume back, but is blissfully unaware that Rosie and Jim have sneaked in.
- 139. "Naughty Little Frog" – 26 January 1999 – A frog suddenly appears inside one of Neil's shoes, and Neil removes it from the boat, only for the frog to find itself inside Neil's hat, and later in his biscuit box.
- 140 "Reeds on the Roof" – 2 February 1999 - Neil comes across a man gathering reeds who then shows him using them to thatch a house's roof.
- 141 "Sailing Boat" – 9 February 1999 - Neil comes across a sailing class on a lake and the instructor invites him to try.
- 142. "Artist at Work" – 23 February 1999 – An artist is drawing the Ragdoll boat, but runs into several mishaps along the way, most notably Rosie and Jim continuously moving Duck around the boat.
- 143. "Disco" – 2 March 1999 - One night, Neil comes across a disco party on another boat and is invited aboard by the guests.
- 144. "Radio Control" – 16 March 1999 – Neil takes part in a remote control boat race in Daventry.
- 145. "Keep Fit" – 23 March 1999 – Neil decides to keep fit, but is startled when he sees what appears to be a ghost under a sheet, which turns out to be Rosie and Jim.
- 146. "Dry Stone Walling" – 30 March 1999 - Neil comes across a man carrying rocks to repair a dry stone wall and offers to help with Rosie and Jim secretly also helping.
- 147. "Baby Elephant" – 6 April 1999 - Neil comes across a man carrying equipment to wash a "very big baby". After offering to carry the equipment to Twycross Zoo, Neil, along with Rosie and Jim, discovers that it is a baby elephant.
- 148. "Washing Day" – 13 April 1999
- 149. "Lifeboat Rescue" – 20 April 1999 – Neil calls the lifeboat rescue crew in Caister-on-Sea to rescue the Ragdoll, after Rosie and Jim untie the mooring ropes at the wrong end.
- 150. "Knitting Factory" – 27 April 1999 – Neil visits a knitting factory to see how woolly sweaters are made, and gets a new sweater after his original one gets snagged in the Ragdoll's control panel.
- 151. "Road Boat" – 4 May 1999 – Neil has the Ragdoll transported on the back of a lorry through Loughborough, to reach the next canal.
- 152. "Line Dancing" – 11 May 1999 – Neil joins in a country western dance party at Lynroy's club in Loughborough.
- 153. "Wallpaper" – 18 May 1999 – Neil is called to redecorate a woman's living room, with Rosie and Jim also lending a hand.
- 154. "High Bar" – 25 May 1999 – Neil visits the City of Birmingham Gymnastics Club.
- 155. "Riding Lesson" – 1 June 1999 – Neil learns to ride a horse at Bourne Vale Riding Stables in Birmingham, but is in for a surprise when Rosie accidentally jumps onto the back of his horse.

(A separate video made in association with British Waterways was also released in 1999, called "Stay Safe Near Water with Rosie and Jim and Duck".)

=== Series 8 (2000) – Neil Brewer ===
- 156. "Disappearing Dog" – 4 January 2000 - Neil looks after Poppy the dog and takes her for a walk. However, she runs off after Rosie and Jim intervene.
- 157. "Upside Down" – 11 January 2000 – Neil is trying to find a bottle of glue to secure a loose floor tile, and vows to find it if he has to turn the Ragdoll boat upside-down.
- 158. "Where's the Wedding Ring" – 18 January 2000 - Neil goes to Nandy and Greg's wedding at St Peter's Church in Reading as the best man but leaves behind the ring. Fortunately Rosie finds it and brings it along.
- 159. "Mother's Day" – 25 January 2000 - Neil's mother, portrayed by Eileen Armstrong, is coming to lunch aboard the Ragdoll and Rosie and Jim try to help prepare. However, they end up making a mess.
- 160. "Steel Band" – 1 February 2000 - Neil comes across a musician named Bubbles who shows him how to make steel drums and sees him perform with his band.
- 161. "Disappearing Trousers" – 8 February 2000 - Neil goes to buy some new trousers with Rosie and Jim secretly joining in.
- 162. "Jumble Duck" – 15 February 2000 - Neil joins in a jumble sale with clutter from the boat and Duck accidentally gets sold.
- 163. "Flour Trail" – 22 February 2000 - Neil comes across a woman laying a trail of flour, a practice called hashing, for runners to follow and joins in the race.
- 164. "Birthday Party" – 29 February 2000 - Neil is invited to Chloe's birthday party so he goes to Woolworths to buy her a present.
- 165. "Lots of Knots" – 7 March 2000 – Neil has to replace the Ragdoll's bow fender after it gets caught a lock gate.
- 166. "Flashing Fire Engine" – 14 March 2000 – Neil volunteers to be rescued by the Royal Berkshire Fire and Rescue Service as part of a fire safety demonstration for children.
- 167. "Amazing Teddy" – 21 March 2000
- 168. "Rescue The Rubbish" – 28 March 2000
- 169. "Water, Water Everywhere" – 4 April 2000
- 170. "Hop to the Hospital" – 11 April 2000 – Neil checks into the Royal Berkshire Hospital after spraining his ankle while mooring up the Ragdoll.
- 171. "Lazy Day" – 18 April 2000 – Neil decides he's had enough cruising for one day and decides to relax, but his day isn't as relaxing as he may have hoped.
- 172. "The Window Cleaner" – 25 April 2000
- 173. "Little Ducklings" – 2 May 2000 - Three little ducklings manage to get onboard the Ragdoll, causing their mother to follow the boat. Rosie and Jim gently sing to the ducklings, then show them to Duck, before returning them to their mother.
- 174. "Runaway Roller Blades" – 9 May 2000
- 175. "The Magic Show" – 16 May 2000 (Series finale)

== Broadcast ==
Pay TV rights to the series were held by Disney Channel for a time in the late 1990s.

== Home media releases ==
Video Collection International Ltd. released VHS tapes of the series. From 1991 to 1994, the tapes were released through the Central Video imprint, which transitioned off to Carlton Home Entertainment's CTE Video imprint for a short time in the mid-1990s, before reverting to Video Collection International until 2004, when it folded into 2Entertain, who subsequently released a promotional DVD of the show in the Daily Mail in 2005.

The Bumper Pack DVD was released by Platform Entertainment in 2016.
