= Neil Brewer =

English musician (born 1954)

- Born: 15 July 1954 (age 71)
- Occupations: Singer; songwriter; musician
- Years active: 1971–present
- Musical career
- Genres: Rock; pop; Progressive rock; Country rock
- Instruments: Vocals; bass guitar; guitar; keyboards; harmonica; concertina
- Formerly of: Druid; The Never Never Band; Splash; Tinderfish

Neil Brewer (born 15 July 1954) is an English musician, who is best known for being a member of the 1970s rock band Druid and for presenting the last four series of Rosie and Jim. Brewer played the role of a musical narrowboat owner, who while floating along the rivers and canals, would make up songs based on the experiences he had. He was nicknamed "Tootle" by the series' title characters. He sang a song at the end of each episode, accompanying himself on the concertina, and sometimes played the harmonica during episodes while seeking inspiration.

Following the deaths of Pat Hutchins in 2017, and original presenter John Cunliffe in 2018, he is the only surviving presenter of Rosie and Jim.

Neil also played bass guitar in The Never Never Band and Splash during the 1970s and 1980s after the demise of Druid.
