= One Two Three and Away =

1960s–90s children's book series by Sheila K. McCullagh

One, Two, Three and Away! (ISBN 0003142183) is a series of books for children written by Sheila K. McCullagh, often known as the Roger Red Hat Books, or The Village with Three Corners. Illustrated mostly by Ferelith Eccles Williams and published by Collins in the 1960s–90s and more recently by The Reading Hut Ltd with new ISBNs. Characters include Roger Red Hat, Billy Blue Hat, twins Johnny and Jennifer Yellow Hat, and Percy Green.

The books were written at a number of levels of increasing difficulty for those learning to read. After the Pre-readers and Introductory book, there are 4 coloured sections, in increasing order of difficulty, blue, red, green, yellow. Accompanying the red, green and yellow levels there are the Main Readers following a loose story arc, 1–3 in pink are aligned with red books, 4–5 with the green, and 6–10 with the yellow.

However the books have since been updated for children at risk of dyslexia, and orthographically mapped with Phonemies, also known as Speech Sound Monsters. They are displayed in the online library at https://www.SpeedieReadies.com

== List of books ==
Pre-readers

- (1) Red
- (1a) Green
- (1b) Roger Red Hat and Mrs. Green's hat
- (2) Blue
- (2a) Red, Green, Blue, Yellow, and Brown
- (2b) Billy Blue Hat and the Snowman
- (3) Yellow
- (3a) Roger and the Ball
- (3b) Jennifer Yellow Hat and the White cat
- (4) Brown
- (4a) Roger and the Bus
- (4b) Jennifer Yellow Hat and Mr. Brown's goat
- (5) One, Two, Three
- (5a) I See Green
- (5b) four five six
- (6) Roger, Billy, Jennifer and Johnny
- (6a) No, Percy Green!
- (6b) Seven Geese
- (7) Big and Little
- (7a) The Yellow Cat and the Brown Dog
- (7b) The big man and the little mouse
- (8) Houses
- (8a) Jennifer and the Yellow Cat
- (8b) Eight, Nine, Ten, Eleven, Twelve
- (9) The Little Yellow Cat and The Little Brown Mouse
- (9a) Stop it, Percy Green!
- (9b) Stop cried alex
- (10) The Cat, the Mouse, the Dog and the Frog
- (10a) Alex at the fair
- (10b) Roger at the fair
- (11) Billy went to school
- (11a) Billy's Picture
- (11b) Billy Blue-hat and the red mask
- (12) Jennifer went to school
- (12a) The donkey went to school
- (12b) Roger and the frog

New publication, from The Reading Hut, updated ISBNs

Bundle: 978-1-916941-36-6 Set of 36 Pre-Readers

Individual Books

- 978-1-916941-00-7 Pre-Reader 1 Red
- 978-1-916941-01-4 Pre-Reader 2 Blue
- 978-1-916941-02-1 Pre-Reader 3 Yellow
- 978-1-916941-03-8 Pre-Reader 4 Brown
- 978-1-916941-04-5 Pre-Reader 5 One, Two, Three
- 978-1-916941-05-2 Pre-Reader 6 Roger, Billy, Jennifer and Johnny
- 978-1-916941-06-9 Pre-Reader 7 Big and Little
- 978-1-916941-07-6 Pre-Reader 8 Houses
- 978-1-916941-08-3 Pre-Reader 9 The Little Yellow Cat and the Little Brown Mouse
- 978-1-916941-09-0 Pre-Reader 10 The Cat and the Mouse, the Dog and the Frog
- 978-1-916941-10-6 Pre-Reader 11 Billy went to school
- 978-1-916941-11-3 Pre-Reader 12 Jennifer went to school
- 978-1-916941-12-0 Pre-Reader 1A Green
- 978-1-916941-13-7 Pre-Reader 2A Red, Green, Blue, Yellow and Brown
- 978-1-916941-14-4 Pre-Reader 3A Roger and the Ball
- 978-1-916941-15-1 Pre-Reader 4A Roger and the Bus
- 978-1-916941-16-8 Pre-Reader 5A I see green!
- 978-1-916941-17-5 Pre-Reader 6A “No, Percy Green!”
- 978-1-916941-18-2 Pre-Reader 7A The yellow cat and the brown dog
- 978-1-916941-19-9 Pre-Reader 8A Jennifer and the yellow cat
- 978-1-916941-20-5 Pre-Reader 9A “Stop it, Percy Green!”
- 978-1-916941-21-2 Pre-Reader 10A Alex at the fair
- 978-1-916941-22-9 Pre-Reader 11A Billy’s Picture
- 978-1-916941-23-6 Pre-Reader 12A The donkey went to school
- 978-1-916941-24-3 Pre-Reader 1B Roger Red-hat and Mrs. Green’s hat
- 978-1-916941-25-0 Pre-Reader 2B Billy Blue-hat and the Snowman
- 978-1-916941-26-7 Pre-Reader 3B Jennifer Yellow-hat and the white cat
- 978-1-916941-27-4 Pre-Reader 4B Jennifer Yellow-hat and Mr. Brown’s goat
- 978-1-916941-28-1 Pre-Reader 5B Four, Five, Six
- 978-1-916941-29-8 Pre-Reader 6B Seven Geese
- 978-1-916941-30-4 Pre-Reader 7B The big man and the little mouse
- 978-1-916941-31-1 Pre-Reader 8B Eight, nine, ten, eleven, twelve
- 978-1-916941-32-8 Pre-Reader 9B “Stop!” cried Alex
- 978-1-916941-33-5 Pre-Reader 10B Roger at the fair
- 978-1-916941-34-2 Pre-Reader 11B Billy Blue-hat and the red mask
- 978-1-916941-35-9 Pre-Reader 12B Roger and the frog

Introductory books

- (A) Roger Red Hat
- (B) Billy Blue-Hat
- (C) Johnny and Jennifer Yellow-Hat
- (D) The Old Man
- (E) Jennifer Yellow-Hat Went out in the Sunshine
- (F) Jennifer Went Out in the Dark
- (G) Roger and Rip
- (H) Roger and the Pond
- (I) Roger and Mrs. Blue-Hat
- (J) Roger and the Little Mouse
- (K) Sita and Ramu
- (L) Jennifer Yellow-hat Went to Town
- (M) The donkey went to town
- (N) Percy Green
- (O) The Little Brown Mouse Went out in the Dark
- (P) Mrs. Blue-Hat and the Little Brown Mouse
- (Q) Mr. Blue Hat and the Red Cart
- (R) Roger, the stick and the old man
- (S) Mrs. Rig and the Little Black Cat
- (T) Mrs. Blue Hat and the Black Cat
- (U) Percy Green and Mr. Red Hat's Car
- (V) Crash! The Car Hit a Tree
- (W) The Kite that blew away
- (X) Ramu and Sita and the Robber
- (Y) Jennifer and the little fox
- (Z) Miranda and the dragon

New publication from The Reading Hut, updated ISBNs

Bundles:

- 979-1-916941-38-0 Introductory Books A-D
- 978-1-916941-37-3 Introductory Books A – P
- Individual Books
- 978-1-8381211-3-6 A – Roger Red-hat
- 978-1-8381211-4-3 B – Billy Blue-hat
- 978-1-8381211-5-0 C – Johnny and Jennifer Yellow-hat
- 978-1-8381211-6-7 D – The Old Man
- 978-1-7398898-0-7 E – Jennifer Yellow-hat went out in the sunshine
- 978-1-7398898-1-4 F – Jennifer Yellow-hat went out in the dark
- 978-1-7398898-2-1 G – Roger and Rip
- 978-1-7398898-3-8 H – Roger and the Pond
- 978-1-7398898-4-5 I - Roger and Mrs. Blue-hat
- 978-1-7398898-5-2 J – Roger and the Little Mouse
- 978-1-7398898-6-9 K – Sita and Ramu
- 978-1-7398898-7-6 L – Jennifer Yellow-hat went to Town
- 978-1-7398898-8-3 M – The Donkey Went to Town
- 978-1-7398898-9-0 N – Percy Green
- 978-1-916941-60-1 O - The Little Brown Mouse went out in the Dark
- 978-1-916941-59-5 P - Mrs. Blue-hat and the Little Brown Mouse

The Main Readers

- (1) The Village with three corners
- (1a) The Old Man and the Wind
- (1b) Gopal and the little white cat
- (2) Billy Blue-Hat and the Duck Pond
- (2a) The cat and the feather
- (2b) Roger and the Ghost
- (3) The Haystack
- (3a) The Donkey
- (3b) The Empty House
- (4) The Island in Deep River
- (4a) The Two Giants
- (4b) The House in the Corner of the Wood
- (5) The Cat's Dance
- (6) The Stepping Stones
- (7) Billy Blue-Hat's Day
- (8) The White Owls
- (9) The Lost Dog
- (10) The Three Robbers
- (11) A Boat on Deep River
- (12) The House in Dark Woods

New publication from The Reading Hut, updated ISBNs

978-1-916941-39-7 The Main Readers Series - 20 Books

- 978-1-916941-38-0 (1) The Village with Three Corners
- 978-1-916941-39-7 (1a) The Old Man and the Wind
- 978-1-916941-40-3 (1b) Gopal and the Little White Cat
- 978-1-916941-41-0 (2) Billy Blue-Hat and the Duck Pond
- 978-1-916941-42-7 (2a) The Cat and the Feather
- 978-1-916941-43-4 (2b) Roger and the Ghost
- 978-1-916941-44-1 (3) The Haystack
- 978-1-916941-45-8 (3a) The Donkey
- 978-1-916941-46-5 (3b) The Empty House
- 978-1-916941-47-2 (4) The Island in Deep River
- 978-1-916941-48-9 (4a) The Two Giants
- 978-1-916941-49-6 (4b) The House in the Corner of the Wood
- 978-1-916941-50-2 (5) The Cat's Dance
- 978-1-916941-51-9 (6) The Stepping Stones
- 978-1-916941-52-6 (7) Billy Blue-Hat's Day
- 978-1-916941-53-3 (8) The White Owls
- 978-1-916941-54-0 (9) The Lost Dog
- 978-1-916941-55-7 (10) The Three Robbers
- 978-1-916941-56-4 (11) A Boat on Deep River
- 978-1-916941-57-1 (12) The House in Dark Woods

Blue

- (1) The Dog and the Ball
- (2) The Little Old Woman
- (3) The Big Dog and the Little White Cat
- (4) The Little Old Man and the Donkey
- (5) Rip's Bath
- (6) The Old Blue Bus
- (7) Sita and the Little Old Woman
- (8) Billy Blue Hat and the Frog
- (9) The Magic Wood
- (10) The Witch and the Donkey
- (11) The Little Brown Mouse and the Apples
- (12) Jennifer in Dark Woods
- (13) Percy Green and Mrs. Blue-hat
- (14) Benjamin, the Witch, and the Donkey
- (15) The Little Old Man and the Little Brown Mouse
- (16) Jennifer and the Little Dog
- (17) The old man and the seven mice
- (18) Roger has a ride
- (19) Miranda and the magic stones
- (20) Miranda and the flying broomstick

Green

- (1) Roger and the School Bus
- (2) The Little Old Man and the Little Black Cat
- (3) The Little Old Woman and the Grandfather Clock
- (4) Sita Climbs the Wall
- (5) When the School Door Was Shut
- (6) The Big Man, the Witch and the Donkey
- (7) Caterpillars and Butterflies
- (8) The Little Old Man and the Magic Stick
- (9) Benjamin and the Little Fox
- (10) The Cat and the Witch's Supper

Red

- (1) Jennifer and the Little Black Horse
- (2) The Old Red Bus
- (3) Billy and Percy Green
- (4) Roger Rings the Bell
- (5) Mr. Brown's Goat
- (6) Tom and the Monster
- (7) The Ghost Train
- (8) Sita and the Robin
- (9) The Hole in the Wall
- (10) The Little Fox

Yellow

- (1) Fire
- (2) The House Across the Street
- (3) Roger and the Cats
- (4) Christmas in the Village with 3 Corners
- (5) The Sleeping Giant
- (6) Dancing Ann and the Green-Gruff-Grackle
- (7) The Fire in the Magic Wood
- (8) The King of the Magic Mountains
- (9) The Witch Who Lived Next Door
- (10) The Horse that Flew in the Moonlight

Hummingbirds

- Early Hummingbirds
- Miranda and the Magic Mixture
- The Witch's Cat
- The Purse Full of Gold
- Adventure in the Night
- The Story of Yestin
- GROUP 1
- The Green Man and the Golden Bird
- Mrs. Blue-hat is Very Cross
- The Magic Cloak
- Horses of the Moonlight
- Halloween
- Sharon and the Great Horse
- GROUP 2
- Jack and the Talking Dog
- The Dancers from the Land of Mor
- The Giant Owls of the High Hills
- Peter and the Little Fox
- The Magic People
- Witches in the Magic Wood
- GROUP 3
- The Ivory Dragon
- Lion-Men of the Mountains
- The Great and Terrible Gift
- The Rescue of Ker
- The King with the Four Daughters
- The Dangerous Journey

== Other media ==
An educational video edition of One, Two, Three and Away: The Village with Three Corners was also released in 1996 by First Independent Video. Directed by Mark Taylor and produced by Bristol-based animation studio A Productions, the video consisted of drawn animation sequences, on screen games and songs. It was executive produced by Dan Maddicott at United Media.

Also available are teachers' notes and activity books, wooden dolls and stamp kits.

The One, Two, Three and Away! series can be purchased directly from current publishers The Reading Hut

In 2023, SEN specialist Emma Hartnell-Baker mapped the books orthographically for dyslexic children, facilitating the development of phonemic awareness and orthographic knowledge. Within Word Mapping Mastery IPA aligned phoneme characters (Phonemies) are also used to improve orthographic awareness, without detracting from the main focus within the One, Two, Three and Away! series: vocabulary knowledge, comprehension, and reading for pleasure.
