= List of In the Night Garden... episodes =

In the Night Garden... is a BBC pre-school children's television programme, first broadcast daily on the CBeebies channel, Series 1 was broadcast starting on 19 March 2007 on the Discover and Do and Bedtime Hour blocks, with series 2 following from 1 September 2008. On 27 September 2010, the BBC confirmed that it would not be commissioning a third series.

== Series overview ==
Series	Episodes	Originally released	
Series	Episodes	First released	Last released
1	55	19 March 2007	14 March 2008
2	45	1 September 2008	6 March 2009

== Episodes ==
=== Season 1 (2007 – 2008) ===
No. in series/Overall episode number	Title	Synopsis	Air date	Ninky Nonk or Pinky Ponk start	First to Go to Sleep	Dance Before Bed
1	Makka Pakka Washes Faces	Makka Pakka starts washing and cleaning up his friends around the garden. He especially washes the teeny tiny Pontipines, everybody loves having their faces washed!	19 March 2007	Ninky Nonk	The Pontipines	No; There was not a dance in this episode.
2	The Tombliboos’ Waving Game	The Tombliboos wave to everybody as they fly through the garden in the Pinky Ponk.	20 March 2007	Pinky Ponk	The Tombliboos	Yes; It was time for the dance to start and it was the first dance in this episode.
3	Everybody All Aboard the Ninky Nonk	Everybody goes for a ride in the Ninky Nonk. The Ninky Nonk stops for Makka Pakka but he does not get in to ride, instead, he washes it.	21 March 2007	Ninky Nonk	Makka Pakka	No
4	The Prettiest Flower	Igglepiggle takes Upsy Daisy on the Ninky Nonk to show her the flowers around the garden until they find the prettiest flower of all.	22 March 2007	Ninky Nonk	Upsy Daisy	Yes
5	Makka Pakka's Trumpet Makes a Funny Noise	Makka Pakka's Trumpet is making a funny noise, but what is happening to it?	23 March 2007	Pinky Ponk	Makka Pakka	Yes
6	The Pontipines in Upsy Daisy's Bed	The Pontipines count up to five and go for a very long walk around the garden. The children find themselves in Upsy Daisy's Bed and Upsy Daisy sends them back to their house.	26 March 2007	Pinky Ponk	Upsy Daisy	No; Upsy Daisy pursues her bed after the Pontipines are gone.
7	Who's Next on the Pinky Ponk	The Tombliboos decide to ride in the Pinky Ponk, but no one notices the Pontipines arrive. They play a game of "who is next". In order of appearance are Makka Pakka, Upsy Daisy, Iggle Piggle, and finally, the Pontipines.	27 March 2007	Ninky Nonk	The Pontipines	Yes; The Pinky Ponk takes everybody to the Gazebo near the end of the episode.
8	Igglepiggle's Blanket in Makka Pakka's Ditch	Igglepiggle loses his blanket. Upsy Daisy helps him look for it. The Gazebo knows where it is!	28 March 2007	Ninky Nonk	Makka Pakka	Yes
9	The Ninky Nonk Wants a Kiss	Upsy Daisy kisses everything in the garden, including a tree, a Daisy, Igglepiggle, the Bridge, and Makka Pakka. She rides around the garden in the Ninky Nonk, visiting and kissing people and things. Suddenly, the Ninky Nonk stops and won't go. Upsy Daisy wonders why and then realizes that the Ninky Nonk wants a kiss too.	29 March 2007	Ninky Nonk	Upsy Daisy	No; the Ninky Nonk malfunctioned.
10	Too Loud Tombliboos! Nice and Quiet	The Tombliboos are practicing their music so loudly it can be heard all over the garden.	30 March 2007	Ninky Nonk	The Pontipines	No; the Tombliboos played music instead.
11	Makka Pakka Gets Lost	Makka Pakka sets off through the garden looking for stones but he loses his way.	3 April 2007 (first aired on BBC TWO)	Pinky Ponk	Makka Pakka	Yes
12	Jumping for Everybody	Upsy Daisy shows Igglepiggle how to jump. Soon everyone jumps around the garden!	1 July 2007	Ninky Nonk	Upsy Daisy	Yes
13	Hiding in the Flowerpots	The Pontipines play hide and seek. The children hide in the large flowerpot. The Tombliboos hide behind the small bush.	4 April 2007	Pinky Ponk	The Pontipines and the Tombliboos	Yes
14	The Pinky Ponk Adventure	The Pinky Ponk gets stuck in a tree and tips up. Everybody slides up one end. They rock back and forth and tip the Pinky Ponk the other way. They slide up to the other end. The Pinky Ponk tips back and forth and everybody slides up and down, having great fun. At last, the Pinky Ponk breaks free.	23 December 2007	Ninky Nonk	The Pontipines	No; the characters missed the dance.
15	The Tombliboos' Tower of Five	The Tombliboos are inside their bush, building with their very own bricks. They build a tower of 5 blocks.	4 July 2007	Ninky Nonk	The Tombliboos	No
16	Igglepiggle's Mucky Patch	Igglepiggle falls down and gets a mucky patch on his tummy. It soon spreads around the garden.	2 July 2007 (first aired on BBC TWO)	Ninky Nonk	Upsy Daisy	No; the characters were very busy.
17	Funny Noise Coming From the Pinky Ponk	The Tombliboos are riding in the Pinky Ponk, enjoying their Pinky Ponk Juice. Each of them makes a different funny noise when they sip their juice.	12 June 2007	Pinky Ponk	The Tombliboos	No
18	Quiet Please, Tombliboos, Upsy Daisy Wants to Sing!	Upsy Daisy sets up her special megaphone to sing. The Tombliboos play music, which disturbs her. They all perform with the Pontipines.	13 June 2007	Ninky Nonk	Upsy Daisy	No; There wasn’t a dance in this episode.
19	The Tombliboos Clean Their Teeth	The Tombliboos run all over the inside of their bush, looking for their toothbrushes. They are so happy that they tell the news to everybody around the garden. Makka Pakka washes their faces before bedtime begins.	5 July 2007 (BBC TWO)	Pinky Ponk	The Tombliboos	No; The Tombliboos brushed their teeth.
20	Igglepiggle's Blanket Walks About by Itself!	Igglepiggle goes dancing. Igglepiggle's blanket has landed on Makka Pakka and seems to be running about by itself. The blanket drops and out comes Makka Pakka. Igglepiggle is so happy to have his blanket again.	6 July 2007 (BBC TWO)	Ninky Nonk	Makka Pakka	Yes
21	The Pontipine Children in the Tombliboos' Trousers	The Pontipines go for a long walk to the Tombliboo house, where the children play a game. They go in the Tombliboos' trousers but they get stuck in Tombliboo Eee's.	9 July 2007 (BBC TWO)	Pinky Ponk	The Pontipines	No; The Pontipine Children got stuck in Tombliboo Eee's trousers.
22	Upsy Daisy's Big Loud Sing Song	Upsy Daisy chooses to sing through her megaphone, and the Pontipines cover their ears. Makka Pakka joins in playing his trumpet. Then they call the Pontipines on the Trubliphones.	10 July 2007 (BBC TWO)	Ninky Nonk	Upsy Daisy	No
23	Playing Hiding with Makka Pakka	The Tombliboos discover a new game – hiding in the garden. Where have they gone?	11 July 2007 (BBC TWO)	Pinky Ponk	The Tombliboos	No; the Tombliboos brush their teeth.
24	The Ball	A ball bounces around the garden, visiting one character after another, even the Pontipines themselves.	12 July 2007 (BBC TWO)	Pinky Ponk	The Pontipines	No
25	Where is the Pinky Ponk Going?	Everyone in the Night Garden boards the Pinky Ponk for a very special journey. But where exactly is the Pinky Ponk heading to?	13 July 2007 (BBC TWO)	Pinky Ponk	The Tombliboos	No
26	Igglepiggle Looks For Upsy Daisy and Follows Her Bed	Igglepiggle drops his blanket. When he comes back to the Bridge, Upsy Daisy is gone.	16 July 2007 (BBC TWO)	Pinky Ponk	Upsy Daisy	Yes
27	Wave to the Wottingers	The Pontipines set out on a walk, but everywhere they go the Wottingers get there first.	17 July 2007 (on BBC TWO)	Ninky Nonk	The Pontipines	Yes
28	The Runaway Og-Pog!	Makka Pakka's Og-pog runs away by itself down the hill and a big pursuit begins. The Pontipine children stop it with a rock.	27 June 2007	Pinky Ponk	The Pontipines	Yes
29	Upsy Daisy, Igglepiggle, the Bed & the Ball	While Upsy Daisy plays with the ball, Igglepiggle decides to go to sleep in her bed.	27 August 2007	Ninky Nonk	Upsy Daisy	No
30	Too Much Pinky Ponk Juice!	Tombliboo Ooo is more interested in drinking Pinky Ponk Juice. He later gets a stomach ache after drinking everybody's juice.	10 October 2007	Pinky Ponk	The Tombliboos	No, The Characters missed the dance. (Except for Makka Pakka and the Pontipines)
31	Looking for Each Other	Igglepiggle can't find Upsy Daisy. With the help of the Tombliboos and Makka Pakka, the two friends find each other again.	15 October 2007 (BBC TWO)	Ninky Nonk	Upsy Daisy	No, although Igglepiggle and Upsy Daisy dance near the gazebo near the end of the episode.
32	High and Low	The Tombliboos explore inside their house, which is full of interesting spaces.	14 October 2008 (BBC TWO)	Ninky Nonk	Makka Pakka	No
33	The Tombliboos Have a Very Busy Day	The Tombliboos spend all day riding the Pinky Ponk and cleaning their teeth.	17 October 2007	Pinky Ponk	The Tombliboos	Yes
34	The Pontipines on the Ninky Nonk	The teeny-tiny Pontipines are left behind when everyone else takes a ride on the Ninky Nonk. When they finally catch the Ninky Nonk, having chased it around the garden, they ride in their own special carriage.	5 April 2007	Ninky Nonk	The Pontipines	No; the characters missed the dance.
35	The Pontipines Find Igglepiggle's Blanket	Igglepiggle is dancing in the garden when he loses his blanket.	9 October 2007	Ninky Nonk	The Pontipines	No
36	Igglepiggle's Accident	Igglepiggle trips over and scatters the stones, which Makka Pakka has cleaned.	15 October 2007	Ninky Nonk	Makka Pakka	No
37	Upsy Daisy Kisses Everything	Upsy Daisy loves the garden so much that she frequently kisses everything around her. When she kisses things, the magic starts to happen. The bridge plays music, the flower grows, and the tree sheds beautiful blossoms.	16 October 2007	Pinky Ponk	Upsy Daisy	Yes
38	Following	The Tombliboos are playing inside their house, but Tombliboo Eee cannot decide what to do.	17 October 2007	Pinky Ponk	The Tombliboos	No
39	Makka Pakka and the Ball!/Look What The Ball Did!	The ball is bouncing all over the garden, knocking over Makka Pakka and his pile of five stones.	18 October 2007	Pinky Ponk	Makka Pakka	Yes
40	The Tombliboos Build an Arch	Inside the Tombliboo house, the Tombliboos build an arch out of their bricks. Then the Pontipine Children built an Arch out of stones.	19 October 2007	Pinky Ponk	The Pontipines	Yes
41	Makka Pakka's Stone Concert	Makka Pakka discovers he can make musical notes by tapping different stones.	22 October 2007	Ninky Nonk	Makka Pakka	No; Makka Pakka did his stone concert instead.
42	Hurry Up Tombliboos	The Tombliboos are in their house when Makka Pakka comes to call; he wants to wash their faces. In their haste to leave, Tombliboo Eee keeps going the wrong way.	23 October 2007	Pinky Ponk	The Tombliboos	No; Tombliboo Eee kept going the wrong way to waste time.
43	Wake Up Igglepiggle	IgglePiggle tucks up in Upsy Daisy's bed. When she returns he has to jump out quickly.	24 October 2007	Ninky Nonk	Upsy Daisy	No
44	Washing the Haahoos	The smallest Pontipines and the biggest Haahoos are clean when Makka Pakka washes their faces. But the Tombliboos are especially clean because they also have great fun cleaning their teeth.	25 October 2007	Ninky Nonk	The Tombliboos	No
45	Where's Upsy Daisy Gone?	Upsy Daisy teaches IgglePiggle how to play hide-and-seek.	26 October 2007	Ninky Nonk	Upsy Daisy	Yes
46	Over and Under/Up and Down	Everyone is riding on the Pinky Ponk when the Ding Dong Alarm goes off. It flies up and above a tree, then down below a branch.	29 October 2007	Pinky Ponk	The Pontipines	No; the characters missed the dance.
47	Upsy Daisy's Tiring Walk	Igglepiggle and Upsy Daisy take a very long walk. Feeling very tired, they decide to return by Ninky Nonk and have a very bouncy ride.	30 October 2007	Ninky Nonk	Upsy Daisy	Yes; although Upsy Daisy was too tired.
48	Makka Pakka's Present	Makka Pakka makes a pile of six stones and then shows it to everyone.	31 October 2007	Ninky Nonk	Makka Pakka	No
49	Igglepiggle Goes Visiting	Igglepiggle goes to visit his friends, but when he goes to visit the Pontipines, he can't find them because they are very small.	1 November 2007	Ninky Nonk	The Pontipines	No
50	Tombliboo Trousers	The Tombliboos are having fun in the garden, but their trousers keep falling, even on the Ninky Nonk.	29 June 2007	Ninky Nonk	The Tombliboos	Yes
51	Where's Your Uff-Uff, Makka Pakka?	Makka Pakka is washing the ball until the ball bounces on his back and he accidentally lets his Uff-Uff fly away. It falls into Upsy Daisy's Bed. After dancing, Upsy Daisy finds it on her bed and returns it to him. "This is the first time Makka Pakka loses one of his items."	10 March 2008	Pinky Ponk	Makka Pakka	No
52	Dinner in the Ninky Nonk	The Pontipines take their dinner on the Ninky Nonk and go on a bouncy ride all over the Garden. The inevitable bouncy ride has comic consequences as they travel upside-down along the branches and around the garden. The dinner gets over the Pontipines and they go home for a wash.	11 March 2008	Ninky Nonk	The Pontipines	Yes; The Pontipines get clean for the dance
53	Igglepiggle's Tiddle	A mysterious jet of water, a tiddle, appears suddenly next to Igglepiggle. He controls it by stomping his feet three times.	12 March 2008	Pinky Ponk	Makka Pakka	Yes
54	Tombliboo Eee Gets Lost	Tombliboo Eee becomes lost and separated from the other two Tombliboos, Unn and Ooo.	13 March 2008	Ninky Nonk	The Tombliboos	Yes
55	Shshsh! Upsy Daisy's having a rest! (Series 1 Finale)	Upsy Daisy wants to rest in her bed, but is disturbed by one character after another.	14 March 2008	Pinky Ponk	Upsy Daisy	No; Upsy Daisy was too tired

=== Season 2 (2008 – 2009) ===
No. in Series	Overall episode number	Title	Description	Air Date	Ninky Nonk or Pinky Ponk start	First To Go To Sleep	Dance Before Bed
1	56	Slow Down, Everybody! (Series 2 Premiere)	Tombliboo Eee plays her drum so fast that everybody does everything very fast.	1 September 2008	Pinky Ponk	The Tombliboos	Yes
2	57	Be Careful, Tombliboos!	While travelling in the Pinky Ponk, it hits and gets stuck up a tree and tips up that the Pinky Ponk juice containers mess the Tombliboos' trousers.	2 September 2008	Pinky Ponk	The Tombliboos	Yes
3	58	Igglepiggle's Noisy Day	Everything in the garden is so noisy that Igglepiggle moves away to find a peaceful place.	3 September 2008	Ninky Nonk	Upsy Daisy	Yes
4	59	The Pontipine Children on the Roof	The Pontipines take a ride on the Ninky Nonk, but Mr. and Mrs. Pontipine can't find the children. It turns out those naughty dollies are riding on the roof of the Pontipine carriage.	4 September 2008	Pinky Ponk	The Pontipines	Yes
5	60	Upsy Daisy Dances With the Pinky Ponk	Upsy Daisy shows her love for everything in the garden by dancing. First, she dances with her bed, then she dances with the Pinky Ponk, and she dances with Makka Pakka.	5 September 2008	Pinky Ponk	Upsy Daisy	Yes; the Gazebo is in the plot of the episode. The alternate version of the Dance is used.
6	61	The Tombliboos Swap Trousers	The Tombliboos' trousers accidentally get mixed up everywhere. It happens on the Ninky Nonk and the Pinky Ponk, but they swap them back.	8 September 2008	Pinky Ponk	The Tombliboos	No; the Tombliboos clean their teeth instead.
7	62	Kicking the Ball	Upsy Daisy is the best at kicking the ball. She shows it to Igglepiggle.	9 September 2008	Pinky Ponk	Upsy Daisy	No
8	63	Where are the Tombliboos' Toothbrushes?	The Pontipine children cannot be found. At the same time, the Tombliboos' toothbrushes just will not stay put. What is going on?	10 September 2008	Pinky Ponk	The Tombliboos	No
9	64	The Pontipines' Picnic	The Pontipines are looking for the perfect place to have a picnic. They invite the Wottingers over, but the Wottingers take a very long time to arrive.	11 September 2008	Ninky Nonk	The Pontipines	Yes
10	65	Upsy Daisy's Funny Bed	After waking Upsy Daisy, Igglepiggle goes with her for a walk in the garden, but Upsy Daisy's Bed wants to go with her.	12 September 2008	Ninky Nonk	Upsy Daisy	Yes
11	66	Upsy Daisy's Special Stone	Upsy Daisy gives her special stone from Makka Pakka to Igglepiggle to look after while she goes for a ride on the Ninky Nonk.	15 September 2008	Ninky Nonk	Upsy Daisy	No
12	67	Makka Pakka's Piles of Three	Makka Pakka is making piles of stones, but he needs another one to make three piles along with Upsy Daisy.	16 September 2008	Pinky Ponk	The Tombliboos	No; the Tombliboos make a pile of three blocks instead.
13	68	Running About	Everybody is running about in the garden so much that Makka Pakka can't wash faces.	17 September 2008	Pinky Ponk	Makka Pakka	No; Makka Pakka was too tired to do the dance
14	69	Trousers on the Ninky Nonk	The Tombliboos' trousers are blown off and fly around the Ninky Nonk. The Tombliboos forgot their trousers and left them behind on the Ninky Nonk.	18 September 2008	Ninky Nonk	Makka Pakka	No
15	70	Where are the Wottingers?	After having their faces washed by Makka Pakka, the Pontipines go to visit the Wottingers. The Wottingers are not in the house; where could they be?	19 September 2008	Ninky Nonk	The Pontipines	Yes
16	71	Windy Day in the Garden	It is a very windy day and the trees are blowing from side to side. Igglepiggle's blanket flies off and lands on Upsy Daisy, while the Tombliboos' trousers fly off the washing line and get stuck on the roof.	22 September 2008	Pinky Ponk	The Tombliboos	Yes
17	72	Tombliboo Ooo Brings the Ball Indoors	The Tombliboos play with the ball indoors until it flies out the window.	23 September 2008	Ninky Nonk	Makka Pakka	Yes
18	73	What a Funny Ninky Nonk	The Tombliboos take a ride on the Ninky Nonk and everybody tries to pursue the Ninky Nonk, even the teeny tiny Pontipines.	24 September 2008	Ninky Nonk	The Tombliboos	No; the characters missed the dance.
19	74	Mr. Pontipine's Moustache Flies Away	While the Pontipines are eating dinner, Mr. Pontipine's moustache flies off and gets stuck to the chimney, then to the bridge, then to the gazebo! It is blown onto the Pinky Ponk. The Pinky Ponk blows the moustache onto Mrs. Pontipine and she gives Mr. Pontipine his moustache back.	25 September 2008	Ninky Nonk	The Pontipines	Yes; Mrs. Pontipine gives Mr. Pontipine his moustache back
20	75	Make Up Your Mind, Upsy Daisy	Upsy Daisy can't decide whether to sing or play with the ball or ride the Ninky Nonk or Pinky Ponk.	26 September 2008	Pinky Ponk	Upsy Daisy	Yes
21	76	Catch The Ninky Nonk, Tombliboos!	Makka Pakka is taking a ride on the Ninky Nonk. The Tombliboos ride on the Pinky Ponk and decide to join him.	29 September 2008	Ninky Nonk	The Tombliboos	No
22	77	Hide and Seek	The Pontipine children hide from the Wottingers and they all end up in Upsy Daisy's bed.	30 September 2008	Pinky Ponk	The Pontipines	No; The Pontipines and Wottingers waved goodbye to each other instead.
23	78	What Loud Music, Tombliboos!	Igglepiggle discovers musical stepping stones.	1 October 2008	Ninky Nonk	Makka Pakka	No
24	79	Where Can Igglepiggle Have a Rest?	Igglepiggle is trying to find somewhere soft to have a rest.	2 October 2008	Pinky Ponk	Upsy Daisy	No
25	80	Waving from the Ninky Nonk	The Ninky Nonk travels around the garden and soon everybody gets on board.	3 October 2008	Ninky Nonk	The Pontipines	No; the characters missed the dance.
26	81	Where Did Makka Pakka's Sponge Go?	Makka Pakka trips over a stone and his sponge flies off and lands in Upsy Daisy's megaphone, Upsy Daisy goes to find Makka Pakka and restore the sponge to him. "This is the second time Makka Pakka loses one of his items."	9 February 2009	Ninky Nonk	Upsy Daisy	No
27	82	Ninky Nonk Dinner Swap	The Pontipines take their dinner aboard the Ninky Nonk.	10 February 2009	Ninky Nonk	The Pontipines	Yes
28	83	Trubliphone Fun	The Pontipines are out for a walk in the garden and hear lots of noise. But Igglepiggle was lost.	11 February 2009	Ninky Nonk	The Pontipines	No
29	84	Makka Pakka's Circle of Friends	Igglepiggle comes across a stone and decides to find Makka Pakka and give it to him.	12 February 2009	Ninky Nonk	Makka Pakka	No
30	85	Long and Ponky Ride in the Pinky Ponk	The Tombliboos are riding the Pinky Ponk, and throughout the ride, as everybody else gets on, it keeps hitting everything in sight.	13 February 2009	Pinky Ponk	The Tombliboos	No
31	86	Sad and Happy Tombliboos	Tombliboo Ooo is building a tower of bricks. Tombliboo Eee spots her favourite brick in Ooo's tower and knocks it over trying to get her brick.	16 February 2009	Ninky Nonk	The Tombliboos	No
32	87	Upsy Daisy Dances with the Pontipines	Upsy Daisy dances with the Tombliboos and the Pontipines, and she even dances with Igglepiggle before the dance.	17 February 2009	Ninky Nonk	Upsy Daisy	Yes; the Gazebo is in the plot of the episode. The alternate version of the Dance plays.
33	88	Mind the Haahoos	The Pontipines and Wottingers are out for a walk in a garden. Mrs. Pontipine spots the Ninky Nonk through her binoculars. The Pontipines hang out with the Wottingers, ride the Ninky Nonk, and try not to harm the Haahoos.	18 February 2009	Ninky Nonk	The Pontipines	No; the characters missed the dance. (Except for the Tombliboos).
34	89	Wake Up, Ball!	Igglepiggle takes the ball, and everybody pursues him through the garden.	19 February 2009	Ninky Nonk	Upsy Daisy	Yes
35	90	Upsy Daisy Forgets Her Stone	Everybody takes stones from Makka Pakka's pile of 5 stones. The teeny tiny Pontipines take Makka Pakka's last stone.	20 February 2009	Ninky Nonk	Makka Pakka	No
36	91	Long-Distance Ball Game	Upsy Daisy kicks the ball, and it crashes into the Pontipines' tree.	23 February 2009	Pinky Ponk	Upsy Daisy	No
37	92	The Wottingers' Hiding Game	The Pontipines are playing hide and seek with the Wottingers. They can't find them until they come back home.	24 February 2009	Ninky Nonk	The Pontipines	Yes
38	93	Upsy Daisy Only Wants To Sing	Upsy Daisy is singing with her megaphone in the garden. Makka Pakka wants to wash Upsy Daisy's face and Igglepiggle wants to play with Upsy Daisy, but she won't let them because she is busy.	25 February 2009	Ninky Nonk	Makka Pakka	No; Upsy Daisy was very tired
39	94	The Tombliboos' Busy Ninky Nonk Day	The Tombliboos ride the Ninky Nonk and it stops in some very lovely parts of the garden. However, when they play with the ball, the Ninky Nonk goes off without them and is out of control.	26 February 2009	Ninky Nonk	The Tombliboos	No
40	95	The Pinky Ponk and the Ball	The Pontipines throw the ball at the Pinky Ponk and send everyone sliding from one end to the other. It then gets knocked upside down.	27 February 2009	Pinky Ponk	The Pontipines	No; although the Pontipines dance at the gazebo near the end of the episode.
41	96	Sneezing	Everybody in the garden sneezes. Makka Pakka does a big sneeze that blows the pinky ponk into a tree, with Igglepiggle and Upsy Daisy inside!	2 March 2009	Ninky Nonk	Makka Pakka	Yes
42	97	Ninky Nonk Or Pinky Ponk	The Tombliboos cannot decide whether to ride in the Pinky Ponk or the Ninky Nonk. They ride the Pinky Ponk until it starts to malfunction.	3 March 2009	Ninky Nonk	The Tombliboos	No; the Gazebo and the Pinky Ponk malfunctioned.
43	98	Oh Look! It's the Wottingers!	The Wottingers and the Pontipines look for each other, but cannot find each other at all.	4 March 2009	Ninky Nonk	The Pontipines	Yes
44	99	Upsy Daisy Dances With the Haahoos	Upsy Daisy dances with the Haahoos. Everybody likes the performance, so everybody joins in for the dance.	5 March 2009	Pinky Ponk	Upsy Daisy	Yes; the Gazebo is in the plot of the episode. The alternate version of the dance plays.
45	100	Fall Down Ball (Series 2 Finale)	The Tombliboos ride on the Pinky Ponk for a while around the garden. The ball wants to play with the Tombliboos, but they would rather play with their bricks, build their own arch, and avoid the ball.	6 March 2009	Pinky Ponk	The Tombliboos	Yes
