= Roger Huntington =

Fictional character from Channel 4 soap opera Brookside

- Brookside character
- Portrayed by: Rob Spendlove
- Duration: 1982–1983
- First appearance: 2 November 1982
- Last appearance: 25 October 1983
- Created by: Phil Redmond
In-universe information
- Occupation: Solicitor's clerk
- Father: Sydney Huntington
- Mother: Margaret Huntington
- Wife: Heather Haversham (1982–1985)

Roger Huntington is a fictional character from the British Channel 4 soap opera Brookside, played by Rob Spendlove. One of the show's original characters, Roger debuted on-screen during the show's first episode broadcast on 2 November 1982. Roger is characterised as an ambitious solicitor who thinks highly of himself. He is a fitness enthusiast with an interest in DIY home improvements. These traits make him a comical figure and source of laughter for the show's other characters. His main storylines are centric to his marriage to Heather Haversham (Amanda Burton). Together they set up a home on Brookside Close and maintain careers to ascend the British social class hierarchy. Writers portrayed an unhappy marriage between the two, depicting them constantly arguing.

Writers expanded Roger's family with the introduction of his parents, Sydney Huntington (Bert Gaunt) and Margaret Huntington (Muriel Lawford). Their interference regarding Roger and Heather having children causes problems in their marriage. In another storyline, Roger is run over and hospitalised with broken ribs. Writers created an infidelity story for Roger and he begins an affair with his client, Diane McAllistair (Rosy Clayton).

Spendlove decided to leave Brookside at the end of his first contract. Spendlove did not enjoy playing Roger or the attention that came with being involved in a soap opera. The show's creator and executive producer Phil Redmond was surprised by Spendlove's decision after he had previously wanted to renew his contract. Redmond was forced to rewrite scripts to accommodate Spendlove's departure, which included Roger leaving the series before Spendlove left in case scenes needed reshooting. Roger's departure storyline featured Heather discovering his affair with Diane. She throws him out of their home and end their relationship. Roger made his final appearance on 25 October 1983.

== Creation and casting ==
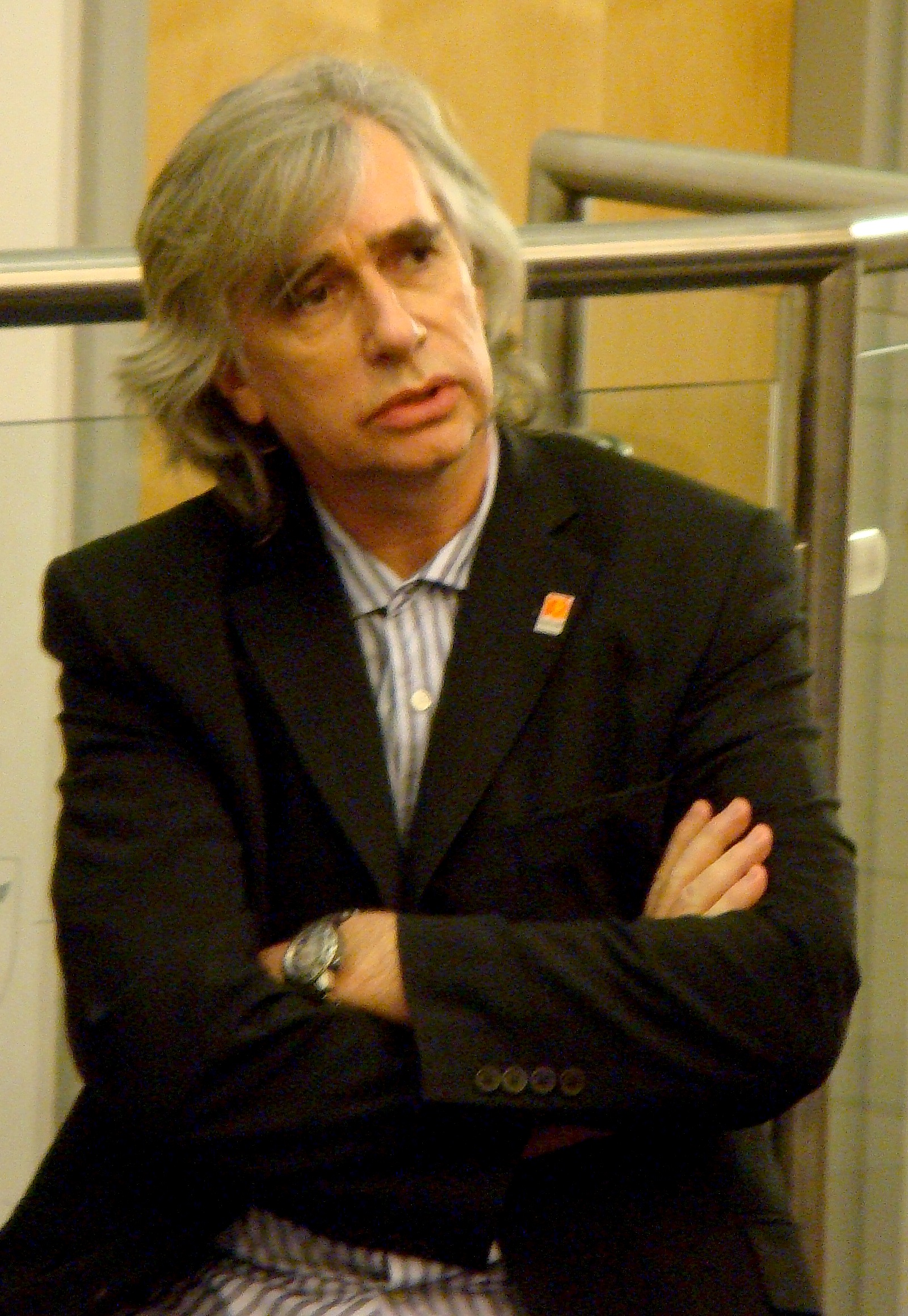
Brookside executive producer Phil Redmond incorrectly assumed Spendlove was a Mancunian and cast him as Roger.

In March 1982, eight months prior to Brookside's television debut, Brookside's creator and Executive producer, Phil Redmond revealed details about the show in an interview with Roy West from Liverpool Echo. He named a selection of characters he envisioned appearing in the series and named Roger Huntington. He added that the character would be a "go-getting solicitors clerk" who is also married to Heather. Redmond added that none of the roles had been cast but the process would need to be completed and filming began by the summer months of 1982. Roger is one of Brookside's original characters and all actors playing these roles were cast by Redmond and production team member Janet Goddard. They cast the roles because a casting director had not yet been hired.

When Brookside was casting for its characters, production primarily wanted northern and Liverpudlian accents to feature in the series. Spendlove is from London and had a south London accent. When Spendlove auditioned for the role he was living in Didsbury in Manchester for some time and began to speak with Lancashire dialect. When Redmond met Spendlove he presumed he was a Mancunian and chose him for the part. Spendlove recalled choosing to deceive his bosses and feared he would be sacked if they discovered he was from London. Each day, Spendlove had to remind himself that he was playing Roger, a northerner from Salford.

On 5 October 1982, Spendlove's role as Roger was announced alongside the casting of the show's other original characters. Actress Amanda Burton had been cast as his on-screen wife. They were billed as a couple both aged twenty-four, who had met at university. The character was mistakenly known and referred to as "Roger Huntingdon" numerous times in British media sources.

== Development ==
=== Characterisation ===
In his backstory, Roger is from Salford in Greater Manchester. He moved to Liverpool to study at the university and gains employment as a solicitor. Spendlove told Geoff Baker from Birmingham Mail that "Brookside is it for Roger, with its trees, cul-de-sac and car. He has a job with good prospects and feels he cant sit back and coast for a while." Of Roger's backstory he explained that Roger "is working class who went to grammar school and now is turning his back on his roots. Like a lot of guys, he is getting old too young."

In the book, Brookside: The Official Companion, show creator Redmond described Roger as a "clever lad". When Roger is introduced into the series, the writers quickly established his marriage to Heather. She is from Northern Ireland and the two met at university. Redmond described them as a "young and ambitious" couple. They have quickly climbed the social class hierarchy by using their good "health and intelligence". Their home is different to others on Brookside Close and appears more like a "Habitat show home". Roger and Heather own a Citroën 2CV to suit their characterisation. Redmond stated that the car was "the chic fun mobile loved and polished by young aspiring professionals everywhere." Roger was portrayed keen to stay fit and created hobbies to remain active such as jogging and badminton. In an introductory character profile published in TVTimes, Roger was described by writer Alan Kennaugh as being "a solicitor's articled clerk, he's a fussy, particular man, married only for two months." Of the Huntington marriage, Kennaugh added "the couple are career minded and are also looking to improve their social standing." Sue Johnston, who plays fellow character Sheila Grant described Roger and Heather as a "upwardly mobile couple" who viewed Brookside Close as a "stepping stone to bigger and better things."

Writers amplified Roger's pompous characterisation as he developed in the series. Redmond also described him as "an immature snob who has forgotten where he came from. He delights in the trappings of professionalism: expenses, working lunches, being away on business. Redmond concluded that Roger is "despicable and irritating to the end. Roger made Heather's life a misery." In the book "Life in the Close", author Geoff Tibballs detailed that Roger "was used to getting his own way" so feels "neglected" when Heather enjoys her own independence. In the book, "Total Brookside: The Ultimate Guide to the Ultimate Soap", Tibballs stated that Roger "saw himself as clever, good-looking and upwardly mobile. Others saw him as smug, stuffy and intensely irritating - a pain in the neck." Writers portrayed Roger as a keen DIY enthusiast. His ventures of installing burglar alarms, television aerials and attempts at putting up shelving "made him the laughing stock of the Close."

=== Marriage and affair ===
In the shows first episode, Roger and Heather are already living in Brookside Close. Alongside the Grants, they were the only families already living on the estate. Following their introduction, writers created a feud between Roger and his neighbours Gavin Taylor (Daniel Webb) and Petra Taylor (Alexandra Pigg). Roger attempts to unite the other residents of Brookside Close against Gavin's suspect activities. Roger's marriage to Heather was problematic. Writers portrayed them warring over various issues. Burton believed that Heather would gain the sympathy of female viewers because Heather is "married to a bit of a jerk". Writers also introduced Roger's parents, Sydney Huntington (Bert Gaunt) and Margaret Huntington (Muriel Lawford) into the series. Their questioning about grandchildren poses an issue for the Huntington marriage. Heather is ambitious and wants to further her career and does not factor having children into their plans. Roger's early stories feature him working as a solicitor's clerk at Derek Hobbs' (Norman Gregory) firm. Derek quickly takes an interest in Heather and takes advantage of situations when Roger is not present. He asks Heather out on a date and begins to buy her expensive gifts. Heather does not reciprocate. Roger was aware of Heather's attractiveness but was still "nevertheless surprised" to learn about Derek's advances. Derek continues to pursue Heather and suggests Roger's future career could rely on her co-operation. In one storyline, Roger and Heather argue and she refuses to collect Roger from work. He decides to make his own way home when he is run over by a vehicle. Roger is hospitalised with four broken ribs.

Roger was featured in an infidelity storyline when he begins a sexual relationship with his client, Diane McAllistair (Rosy Clayton). Redmond described Roger as falling "foul of lust" in the "irresistible form" of Diane. The affair was one of Brookside's first storylines that was successful in boosting their viewing figures. Their audience share grew to over two million and the show's press office began to receive more fan mail. A Brookside publicist told Laura Payne from Daily Mirror that "we are getting all kinds of mail since the Roger affair started. Women write telling Heather to sort Roger out." Clayton was approached by a female viewer who told her that a woman like Diane ruined her own marriage. The story develops with Roger and Heather arguing more often after he begins his affair with Diane. When Heather begins impulse spending, Roger becomes irrational and shouts at Heather. Roger begins arriving home later than usual and lies to Heather about his whereabouts. In one episode, Roger goes to a garden centre alone and refuses to allow Heather to accompany him. There he arranges a secret meeting with Diane. But Heather's characterisation meant that she was "nobody's fool" and begins to realise his deception. When Roger goes on a prolonged business trip to Birmingham, Heather suspects he is not alone.

Heather later finds a tie pin in Roger's jacket and demands to know where it has come from. Roger avoids Heather's questions leading to her accusing him of having an affair. Heather discovers that Roger has been having an affair with Diane after listening to a private telephone call between them. Heather throws him out of their home. The scenes feature Heather calling Roger a "sod" as she slaps him. She continues to verbally abuse Roger as she throws him out of their home and orders him to take himself and his work to Diane's house. Redmond created the telephone call scene so that viewers could see the reactions of both Heather and Roger's faces. He did not want Heather to discover the affair in a cliché way such as finding a hotel receipt or another woman's lipstick. In the following episode, Roger goes to stay with Diane, but she informs him that she is leaving for Barbados without him. Roger is then left with nowhere to live. When Heather goes to stay in Northern Ireland, Roger returns to their home temporarily. He nearly causes a house fire by cooking toast and falling asleep. Roger's neighbour George Jackson (Cliff Howells) smells burning and stops the fire spreading.

=== Departure ===
"Roger was a wimp. I didn't enjoy playing him. I think Brookside is the best soap on television, but if you do a series like that you've got to like the character. I liked Roger for about a month."

— Spendlove's opinion of Roger. (1990)

Roger was written out of Brookside after only one year. His final stories feature Sydney intervening in the Huntington marriage. Roger and Heather discuss a potential reconciliation. Heather ultimately decides that their marriage is over and Roger leaves Brookside Close permanently. Roger made his final appearance on 25 October 1983. When Brookside was approaching the end of its first production year, Redmond began negotiating new contracts. Spendlove wanted to remain in the series and a new contract was offered. He soon changed his mind and informed Redmond he wanted to leave. Redmond stated that Spendlove received another job offer which required him to leave immediately at the end of his contract.

Spendlove has claimed he was bored of playing Roger after one month of filming and did not enjoy playing him. Brookside faced many technical issues during its early months of production that made his experience "dodgy and ropey". He told Stuart Gilles from Western Daily Press that Roger "was a wimp and I didn't enjoy him. I got fed up with the role." Spendlove also received hate mail from female viewers who were annoyed at Roger's treatment of Heather. He considered quitting then but chose to stay longer. Spendlove eventually grew tired of the attention he got from acting in a soap opera and looked for work elsewhere. Spendlove was informed that Roger would not be killed off because the character Gavin Taylor had died earlier that year. He added that producers wanted the possibility of Roger and Heather reuniting in the future. Spendlove's request to leave as soon as his contract expired worried Redmond. He believed that if any reshoots were required, Spendlove would be unavailable. He decided to rewrite scripts and quickly end the Huntington marriage. His plan was for Roger to be written out prior to Spendlove's contract expiring in case they needed to film additional content.

Redmond helped to write the first 90 episodes of Brookside. The final storyline he wrote for the show was the breakdown of Roger and Heather's marriage. His final four episodes all featured Roger and Heather's marital drama. But Redmond believed that his writing team did not have the time to spare to change the scripts. Redmond had one week to rewrite the episodes himself without their help. He recalled in his autobiography titled "Midterm Report" that the process took around five days to complete. The episode featuring Heather discovering Roger's affair took him four hours to write and was the fastest he had ever wrote a script. Redmond chose to break Roger and Heather up so Burton could remain in the series. Redmond commented that "the end of that first year was my personal golden age of Brookside. That was when we had the breakdown of Roger and Heather's marriage and that meant a lot to me personally because I wrote those scripts, too." Redmond stated in his autobiography that two of Roger's final scenes were all time favourite Brookside moments. These scenes were Sydney telling Roger that he did not love his mother, Margaret but made a vow to stay with her. The second was Heather discovering his affair and throwing him out of the house.

== Reception ==
Kay Nicholls, author of the book Real Soap: Brookside described Roger as a "cocky but basically crap man-about-the-house". She likened him to the fictional character Hyacinth Bucket, a pretentious fictional character from the BBC sitcom Keeping Up Appearances, portrayed by Patricia Routledge. She stated that Roger, like Hyacinth "liked to keep up appearances on Brookside Close" and saw himself as "lord of the manor" of an "upwardly-mobile home". Nicholls branded Roger a "completely useless DIY fanatic" who was "the subject of much amusement for his neighbours." Dorothy Hobson, in her book Soap Opera described Roger and Heather as a "newly married, dual-career family". She opined that in their marriage "compromise was not an option and infidelity was not tolerated." Hilary Kingsley, author of Soapbox branded Roger a "sly solicitor" who "seemed a weed but turned out a two timer who slept with a woman client." Jo Bayne from Western Daily Press wrote that Roger was "supercilious" and compared him to the fictional character Jeffrey Fourmile from the sitcom George and Mildred. Jeffrey took on the role of a "snooty neighbour" which Bayne associated with Roger. They added that "unfortunately Roger is not playing it for laughs. He is merely a pain in the neck. He is symptomatic of the basic fault of the series. Its realism is of the most mundane kind."

An Inside Soap reporter wrote that "it looked like Heather and Roger Huntington's marriage was made in heaven. Both were young, handsome and successful in their respective careers. That was until Roger fell for the charms of his co-worker Diane McAllistair." In the book Women and Soap Opera, Christine Geraghty opined that the married characters of Jonathan Gordon-Davies (Steven Pinner) and Laura Wright (Jane Cunliffe) and his later relationship with Cheryl Boyanowsky (Jennifer Calvert) mimicked Roger and Heather's relationship. She added "their combination of career woman feminist and sceptical male ambition have almost exactly replicated the original Heather and Roger." Jonathan Bignell and Stephen Lacey, who wrote British Television Drama: Past, Present and Future called Roger and Heather "Young Urban Professionals" or "Yuppies" that became prominent in 1980s Britain. They assessed "they were in the programme to symbolise the rise of the new professional classes that would help deliver, measure and regulate the newer service industries." The Birmingham Mail's Geoff Baker praised Roger and Diane's affair storyline. He stated "the action is really hotting up" and it was "the stuff soap opera is made of, sensational and addictive." Baker believed the story deserved more attention and was overshadowed by an affair storyline featured in rival soap opera Coronation Street. He added that it was a "marvellous scene" when Heather "smashed him across the face".

Paddy Shennan from Liverpool Echo disliked the character and stated "Roger (Rob Spendlove) was a right prat, wasn't he? Bad 'tache, too (is there any other kind?)". British author and artist John Coulthart opined that Spendlove's "character in the soap was a weak husband." Ken Irwin from Daily Mirror described the character as "an ambitious and rather snobby solicitor's clerk with great social aspirations."

Roger's affair with Diane earnt him notoriety as an adulterous and philandering character which critics commented on for years later. In January 1988, a Nottingham Post critic named him the "philandering solicitor". In March 1990, Syd Gillingham from Western Daily Press branded him a "philanderer". That month, Stuart Gilles (Manchester Evening News) branded him a "philandering solicitor" and "Brookside lothario". Lynne St Claire from Nottingham Post added he was the "philandering Roger". In December 1992, an Inside Soap reporter branded him the "philandering husband". In August 1993, John Millar (Daily Record) opined that Spendlove was "still remembered as womanising solicitor's clerk Roger." In November 2002, Dawn Collinson (Liverpool Echo) stated that Roger had "straying ways" and described him as "the unfaithful solicitor who cheated on his wife Heather with one of his clients." In June 2003, Kirsti Adair of Liverpool Daily Post called him a "unfaithful solicitor".
