= Heather Haversham =

Fictional character from Brookside

- Brookside character
- Portrayed by: Amanda Burton
- Duration: 1982–1986
- First appearance: 2 November 1982
- Last appearance: 9 December 1986
- Created by: Phil Redmond
In-universe information
- Other names: Heather Huntington; Heather Black
- Occupation: Accountant
- Father: Jack Haversham
- Mother: Gill Haversham
- Husband: Roger Huntington (until 1985); Nicholas Black (1986)
- Stepsons: Adam Black; Scott Black
- Stepdaughters: Ruth Black
- First cousins: Teddy Jordan

Heather Haversham (also Huntington) is a fictional character from the British Channel 4 soap opera Brookside, played by Amanda Burton. Heather is one of the show's original characters and debuted on-screen during the first episode broadcast on 2 November 1982. Heather and her husband, Roger Huntington (Rob Spendlove), assume the roles of the show's young professional characters. Portrayed as yuppies, they work in accountancy and prioritise their careers over anything else. Writers characterised Heather as ambitious and studious, determined to be a successful accountant. Another theme writers often used in developing Heather was heartbreak via her numerous failed romances. She transformed into an unlucky-in-love character, with a failed marriage to Roger and hopeless relationships with Stuart Griffiths (Danny McCarthy), Don Summerhill (Jonathan Barlow) and Tom Curzon (Brian Stephens).

Heather was later partnered with Nicholas Black (Alan Rothwell), an architect with a quirky persona which Heather fell in love with. Writers decided to inflict more trauma on the character by exploring Nick's drug addiction to heroin. The two characters marry but their happiness is short due to Nick's behaviour. Heather initially tolerates Nick's behaviour until he attempts to pressure her into taking heroin. Writers killed Nick off in an overdose story and Burton left the series shortly afterward. The character's departure story featured Heather leaving abruptly and auctioning off her house and its contents. Burton described her time on the show as "wonderful training" and stated that she "absolutely loved" the fame she achieved via the role. Heather has been praised by critics of the genre for her personality and making accountancy "sexy". However, critic Paula Young, writing for Soaps, bemoaned Heather's characterisation stating that she "falls in and out of love like there's no tomorrow."

== Casting ==
In 1982, Burton was cast as Heather, one of the original Brookside characters. Burton had limited experience in the television industry, having only appeared on The Rod Hull Show. Heather was Burton's first acting role on television. Burton later told Brian Viner from The Independent that "Suddenly, I had a sense of belonging. Brookside really was like a family. And it gave me so much confidence."

== Development ==
=== Characterisation and relationships ===
"In 1982, one of the central characters was Heather Haversham, played by Amanda Burton, who introduced the soap viewer to the world of the yuppies."

— Brookside creator Phil Redmond describes the role Heather played in 1980s soap opera. (1999)

When the series begins, Heather lives at number nine Brookside Close, alongside her husband, Roger Huntington (Rob Spendlove). She and Roger met while studying at Liverpool University, formed a relationship and stayed in the city. The couple represent the British upper-middle class and young professionals. Heather is Irish and is used to having good finances because her parents run a successful hotel in Northern Ireland. Heather works as an accountant and is characterised as a glamorous female. In the book, Brookside: The Official Companion, show creator Phil Redmond profiled Heather as a "accountancy undergraduate with a smile that could buy her the world." Heather is "ambitious" and studious, wanting to pass her final accountancy exams. Heather loves money and her work to the extent that she brings extra work home to complete in the evenings. Heather and Roger do not plan on beginning a family because Heather realises that she needs to concentrate solely on her career to be successful. Redmond noted that despite this characterisation, Heather "isn't heartless" and perhaps would consider a family of her own in the future. He added that Heather was a "central character" who introduced viewers to the lifestyle yuppies had become accustomed to.

In a character profile published in TVTimes, Heather was described a career woman and together with Roger, they look to improve their social standing. Heather and Roger's home appears like a "Habitat show home" and in line with their long working days, dinner is always served at 8PM. To add authenticity to Heather's lifestyle, producers ensured that Heather has a Citroën 2CV parked in her driveway. Redmond said that the car was "the chic fun mobile loved and polished by young aspiring professionals everywhere." Writers chose to portray Heather as a private person in relation to the other characters on the show. Heather did converse with her neighbours, but they often only see her when she is leaving for work or arriving home.

Writers had no intention of portraying a happy marriage for Heather and Roger. His characterisation as an "immature snob" who "delights in the trappings of professionalism" is a threat to their marriage. Roger often goes away on business trips, which he is able to use as a cover story when he begins an affair with Diane McAllister (Rosy Clayton). Writers were quick to portray Heather as savvy to Roger's infidelity. She notices Roger coming home later and even smells another women's perfume on him. His business trips become longer and Roger's boss Derek Hobbs (Norman Gregory) becomes interested in Heather. He decides to pursue her in Roger's absence, buying her gifts. When Heather discovers that Roger has gone to Birmingham with Diane, she confronts him and throws him out of their home. Heather is upset and goes to stay at her parents hotel. When she returns, she and Roger decide to end their marriage. Heather continues to work at Hamilton-Devereaux and immerses herself in her work. She passes her final exams and to combat evening loneliness, she invites her colleague, Polly to live with her.

In September 1984, Redmond revealed that viewers did not want Roger to return. He noted that Roger was not disliked but the viewers' admiration of Heather had grown. Redmond added "they admire Heather for making a stand as a woman and they don't want her to weaken. Any hint of romance and the letters start rolling in." Writers changed the character's name from Heather Huntington to Heather Haversham, which in the story is her maiden name. They also created a series of new romantic stories for Heather, as she decides to give dating a try. Heather's appearance and status attract two men competing for her affections. She meets Dr. Stuart Griffiths (Danny McCarthy) at a party, but he falls asleep during their first date. Like Heather, he puts his career first. When Heather buys a used Volkswagen Scirocco, she meets car salesman Don Summerhill (Jonathan Barlow). Redmond said that Heather finds Don "intriguing and engaging" and completely different from herself. Heather likes Don and wants to pursue their relationship further. When the pair attempt to have sex, they are interrupted by Don's wife. Heather is branded a "man poacher" and she is "hurt by the fact that she has been deceived." Heather is loath to be hurt again and ends contact with Stuart too.

Writers continued to invest in Heather and introduced Brian Stephens as Heather's new love interest Tom Curzon. He owns the company Curzon Communications which is due to be floated on the stock exchange. Heather is given the task of sorting out the company's accounts. Tom is wealthy and enjoys fine wine, which impresses Heather. The pair begin dating and eventually start planning their future. Brookside also commissioned location filming to include their holiday in Portugal in episodes. Men betraying Heather was common theme in her story and writers played on it once again. When Heather witnesses Tom meeting with a mystery girl, she confronts him. Tom confesses that she is his secret daughter, Rowena Curzon (Uncredited).

Heather feels betrayed once again and thinks that men cannot be trusted. Tom asks Heather to marry him and takes her to a house that he intends to buy them. Heather is shocked when Tom asks her to quit her job and have children with him, which causes Heather to break up with him. Redmond stated that it was an example that Heather had "learned to love her independence and ambition still rules her heart". Heather does love Tom but cannot bear to become a stay at home mother and wife. She is "heartbroken" but knows that she must carry on with her career. Other residents on Brookside Close fail to notice anything is wrong with Heather because of her tendency to keep her personal life a secret from them.

=== Second marriage and departure ===
Heather's next relationship is with an architect, Nicholas Black (Alan Rothwell). The two meet after Nick has a minor collision with Heather's car. He takes Heather's address and later calls around to sort the damage to the car. Heather is decorating her house with Joyce Harrington (Gil Brailey) and Nick invites himself inside to help them. He ends up convincing Heather to let him stay over and complete the decorating in one night. He manages to finish by morning and Heather develops a bond with him. They begin dating, Redmond described Nick as "no Paul Newman" but Heather was not concerned about good looks. Nick is portrayed as "cheerful and optimistic in an almost childlike way" and Heather is left falling in love with him.

Nick draws silly cartoons for Heather and he is honest about his family life. Nick had previously been married to Barbara Black (Brenda Elder), but their marriage ends when she comes out as a lesbian. They have three children together, Ruth (Joanne Sidwell), Scott (Philip Glancy) and Adam Black (Toby King). Polite Adam is the easiest of Nick's children for Heather to bond with. She finds it difficult to cope with awkward Scott and Ruth then causes problems for Heather and Nick because she is jealous of their relationship. In addition, writers introduced Nick's best friend Charlie Dawson (Philip McGough). Heather takes an instant dislike to Charlie, but Nick stresses that Charlie is harmless and they have a long friendship. Despite basically living with Heather, Nick refuses to give up his flat which he uses to meet with Charlie.

Writers once again created relationship turmoil for Heather, who had become a firmly established as an unlucky in love character. Heather discovers that Nick had been cashing in cheques amounting to hundreds of pounds but could not explain where the money went. As an accountant, Heather uses her knowledge to take control of his finances. She excuses his behaviour, believing that Nick is just an eccentric person. She goes ahead with their wedding day and marries Nick with their friends and family in attendance. But Nick continues to hide away with Charlie in his flat. Heather presumes that Nick and Charlie are gay and are having an affair.

Heather decides to go to his flat and confront them, only to find that Nick has overdosed on heroin. Nick survives and it is revealed that Nick and Charlie are long-term functioning heroin addicts who have managed to get by in life. Heather decides to give Nick another chance if he promises to stop taking drugs. Barbara warns Heather that Nick will never change. Heather loves Nick and thinks she can change his behaviour. She confiscates his cheque book and he steals Heather's jewellery and sells it to purchase heroin. Heather confronts Nick, who laughs in her face. She visits Barry Grant (Paul Usher) for advice because he his ex-girlfriend was addicted to heroin. He tells Heather to leave Nick, or else she will end up an addict. Heather decides to give Nick an additional chance but later finds him drugged up and they argue. Nick tries to convince Heather to take heroin with him their argument ends with Nick leaving their home. Nick is found dead on a bench in Sefton Park, and it is determined that he fell asleep having smoked heroin and died from hypothermia.

In 1986, Burton decided to leave Brookside after four years to pursue other acting projects. Heather decides she can no longer live on Brookside Close where she has experienced so much trauma. She gives Barry her house keys, gets into her car and leaves late at night with just a couple of suitcases on the back seat. A solicitor later auctions off the house and its contents. Heather initially moved back to Ireland and never returned to Brookside Close. In the 1994 book, Phil Redmond's Brookside - Life in the Close, it was revealed that Heather spent three years in Ireland and then moved to Derbyshire. It was also detailed that Heather was in a long-term relationship with a general practitioner but did not want to marry him. In the programme, however, Heather's possessions are auctioned off by a solicitor in March 1987, after she moved to London and asked Paul (Jim Wiggins) and Annabelle Collins (Doreen Sloane) to send on only her clothes and some photographs.

Later discussing her time in Brookside, Burton told Emily Bearn from The Daily Telegraph that "It was a wonderful training, I was still quite naïve when I joined the programme but I learned so much from it. You learn more on set than you ever could in a drama school." Burton also "absolutely loved" the fame that Brookside gave her, adding "of course it was a thrill then because I equated it with success."

== Reception ==
Erin Santillo from Staffordshire Live said that Burton "quickly became a fan favourite on the soap." A writer from Soap magazine profiled the character, stating "Heather Haversham was the lovely accountant who constantly raised the temperature of all the male members of Brookside. She married a solicitor, Roger Huntington but that went horribly wrong." An Inside Soap reporter wrote that "it looked like Heather and Roger Huntington's marriage was made in heaven. Both were young, handsome and successful in their respective careers." A writer from the magazine Soaps branded her "Brookside's most eligible bachelor girl, Heather Haversham". They added that Heather had "fallen for" Nick's "home cooking and witty cartoons". Their colleague Paula Young criticised the show stating, "this year, the plot's been a bit of a damp squib as far as I can see. Just like Heather Haversham, who falls in and out of love like there's no tomorrow, its staying power is highly suspect. Some major changes are long overdue." In his book, The Who's Who of Soap Operas, author Anthony Hayward branded Heather a "glamorous accountant". An Inside Soap columnist agreed with Hayward, writing "the only woman who could make accountancy seem sexy, she went from one romantic disaster to another." The Independent's Brian Viner similarly opined that Burton "managed the near-impossible, by making an accountant both interesting and sexy." The Liverpool Echo's Dawn Collinson said Heather was a "sexy" character.

A writer from The Northern Echo described Burton's time on the show, stating "no one would expect her to do anything but suffer in a soap, so her four years as accountant Heather Haversham in Channel 4's Brookside were an emotional rollercoaster, low on fun." A reporter from the Irish Examiner, Daphne Lockyer of the Daily Express and Emily Bearn from The Daily Telegraph branded the character a "yuppie accountant". A writer from The Observer similarly branded the Huntingtons a "yuppie couple". The Observer's Kathryn Flett branded her a "ghastly yuppie". Sophie McCoid and James Rodger (Birmingham Mail) stated that Heather "soon became one of the show's most popular residents." A writer for The Guide Liverpool branded Heather a "high flying, urban professional" who "endured a lot of heart ache in her four years on the close including cheating hubby's, car accidents and drug abuse." Daniel Kilkelly writing for Digital Spy described the character as "career-minded". He assessed that she "certainly wore the trousers in her relationship" with Roger and that her second marriage was "even more of a disaster". James Moore and Clare Goldwin from the Daily Mirror said that Heather's "top storyline" was "discovering her husband had cheated on her." Inside Soap ran a feature compiling "The 100 greatest soap stories ever told". They featured Nick hiding his heroin addiction from Heather as their 69th choice.
