= Laura Wright (Brookside) =

Fictional character from the Channel 4 soap opera Brookside

- Brookside character
- Portrayed by: Jane Cunliffe
- Duration: 1987–1988
- First appearance: 6 April 1987
- Last appearance: 4 January 1988
- Created by: Phil Redmond
In-universe information
- Other names: Laura Gordon-Davies
- Occupation: Solicitor
- Father: Geoff Wright
- Mother: Dorothy Wright
- Sisters: Joanne Wright
- Husband: Jonathan Gordon-Davies

Laura Wright (also Gordon-Davies) is a fictional character from the British Channel 4 soap opera Brookside, played by Jane Cunliffe. The character debuted on-screen during the episode broadcast on 6 April 1987. Laura is introduced as part of a new yuppy couple, alongside Jonathan Gordon-Davies (Steven Pinner). Cunliffe was invited to audition for the role and had three screen tests before she was successfully cast. Pinner was cast later and was required to screen test with Cunliffe before being chosen to play Jonathan. Laura is characterised as "a bright intellectual" and an "aspiring career woman". Laura and Jonathan are both portrayed as solicitors; they are introduced together and purchase 9 Brookside Close from Heather Haversham (Amanda Burton), begin decorating the house and plan their wedding. Writers introduced Laura's on-screen family consisting of her parents, Geoff Wright (Arthur Kelly) and Dorothy Wright (Jacqueline Morgan) and her sister, Joanne Wright (Carleen Lundon). Writers developed the characters via their wedding preparation stories. Their wedding ceremony formed the basis of the show's 500th episode. Writers kept the outcome of the wedding a secret from viewers, playing into Laura's initial indecision but the two characters marry. Writers played Laura as a "stroppy" character who is often mean to Jonathan and Cunliffe enjoyed playing a "horrible" character.

Cunliffe decided to not renew her contract with Brookside and leave the role. Her decision surprised the show's production team and her fellow cast mates. Producers had planned a long-term future for Laura and Jonathan which was ruined by Cunliffe's choice. Pinner feared losing his job as he believed that Jonathan would subsequently be written out too. Redmond decided to kill the character off but chose to fill out the remainder of Cunliffe's contract having Laura confined to a hospital bed. Laura is electrocuted by a light switch, falls down the stairs and hits her head. She never wakes from her coma, is placed on a life support machine. Jonathan and the Wrights deliberate the outcome of Laura's condition but eventually accept that she is dead and consent to her life support being removed. Cunliffe made her final appearance as Laura during the episode broadcast on 4 January 1988.

Laura received mixed reviews from television critics. Many commented on her and Jonathan's status as the show's new yuppies. Laura's wedding was well received and garnered praise. Her departure storyline and death were described as "high drama" that played to Brookside's strengths. Other critics disliked Laura, branded her "annoying" and criticised Cunliffe's portrayal.

== Casting ==
Laura was cast to Jane Cunliffe, who was from Oldham but living in London when she took on the role. Cunliffe was had completed a diploma in theatre studies, gained her actors equity and was a relative newcomer to television, having previously played a guest role in rival soap opera, Emmerdale Farm. Producers were casting for new characters to take over the house previously occupied by Heather Haversham (Amanda Burton). Cunliffe was familiar with Brookside's storylines and recalled wondering who would move into 9 Brookside Close following Burton's departure. Cunliffe was offered an audition and recalled her surprise upon learning the character would be moving into the house. She told Ken Irwin from Daily Mirror that she "just couldn't believe it" when the opportunity arose. Cunliffe had three screen tests as Laura before being offered the part.

Laura was introduced alongside her on-screen love interest, Jonathan Gordon-Davies (Steven Pinner). Cunliffe had already been cast as Laura when Pinner went to audition for the role of Jonathan. He was required to act out domestic style scenes and casting directors were satisfied the two were a good match to work together. Pinner believed that he and Cunliffe fitted into the established cast well. He told a reporter from Daily Echo that "they are a great bunch of people, both Jane and myself were made welcome." Cunliffe and Pinner's casting and character details were announced on 2 April 1987. A show publicist told a Daily Record reporter that "we wanted to show that Brookside is not full of scouse characters." Cunliffe made her first appearance as Laura during the Monday episode broadcast on 6 April 1987.

== Development ==
=== Characterisation ===
Both Laura and Jonathan work as solicitors and continue Brookside's then trend of having professionals living at 9 Brookside Close. In the book, Brookside: The Official Companion, show creator Phil Redmond described Laura and Jonathan as being a "young achievers" and a "safe, solid and reliable" couple just like their Volvo 340 car. She is also characterised as Jonathan's "yuppie bride" who is "a bright intellectual who aspires to be upwardly mobile." In her backstory, Laura is given "her roots in a working-class background" but she studied Law at university and completes her initial law articles with a Liverpool firm. She is "very attractive and highly professional". Writers ensured that Laura was depicted as "fiercely independent, witty and fashionable" and an "ambitious and dedicated solicitor" who strives to get ahead of the rest in her career. Redmond believed Laura's "idealism may well conflict with her role as a solicitor." It was also noted that the show's long-term plan was to make Laura a "new symbol of the aspiring career woman of the 1990s" but wanted her to also have a "social conscience". Producers hired Jacqueline Morgan to play Laura's mother, Dorothy Wright and she remained in the role while Laura was on-screen. Dorothy, along with her husband Geoff Wright (Arthur Kelly) are portrayed as being proud parents of Laura's achievements. Laura's sister, Joanne Wright (Carleen Lundon) was also introduced and Jonathan takes a dislike to her being around their house often.

In the book, "Total Brookside: The Ultimate Guide to the Ultimate Soap", author Geoff Tibballs described Laura as a "working-class girl made good". He added she is a "modern woman, with a strong streak of independence and a firm sense of justice." Tibballs assessed that work was more important to her than anything else, including Jonathan. This was conveyed by writers via a legal case storyline in which Laura becomes too involved in "complex deportation case". Laura even postpones her own wedding to continue giving her attention solely to the case. Despite both Laura and Jonathan on similar career paths, writers portrayed them in contrast to each other. Jonathan is more "pragmatic and conventional" than Laura. He assumes Laura's future role will be as a mother to their children and aspires to secure a law partnership to financially support his vision. Tibballs also assessed that Laura and Jonathan's career approaches were played in stark contrast to each other. Laura and Jonathan were portrayed as a squabbling couple. Cunliffe told Susie King from Daily Mirror that "Laura's so stroppy, she gives her husband a lot of earache. It's interesting playing someone so horrible."

Cunliffe was told that she would replaced Amanda Burton as the show's new "sex symbol". She told Birmingham Daily News' Sharon Thomas that she believed this was unlikely because of how Laura dresses. She explained "when I'm all done up in smart clothes for Brookside, it feels more like Dynasty." Cunliffe preferred Laura's casual wardrobe over Laura's solicitor attire. She told King that Laura's suits made her feel like a Thunderbird puppet on set.

=== Laura and Jonathan's wedding ===
In their initial storylines, Laura and Jonathan plan their wedding and begin decorating their new home which they purchase from Heather. Laura looks forward to moving in but "not to all the fuss and expense of the wedding". The cast were secretive about whether or not Laura and Jonathan would eventually marry. Pinner told Thomas that "we tell everyone in the Close that we are decorating the house ready for the wedding, but we'll have to see." Pinner told Andrew Knight from Evening Express that "we had a lot of fun together and I enjoyed the build up to the wedding immensely." However, writers created a series of issues between the two characters in the build up to their wedding. Laura appears to be unenthusiastic about the wedding plans and Jonathan refuses to sign a marriage contract Laura conjures up.

The wedding storyline formed the basis of Brookside's 500th episode. Writers ensured added drama for viewers to keep them guessing whether or not Laura would marry Jonathan or jilt him at the altar. Advance storyline write ups did not enclose spoilers about the outcome of the wedding. In episode 499, Laura is depicted as being too calm about her upcoming nuptials. Writers also planned "dramatic conflict" for the characters following the wedding episode. The duo go on to marry and Jonathan gifts Laura an eighteen foot inflatable gorilla outside their home. Laura's wedding scenes made Cunliffe realise the amount of preparation work required. Cunliffe revealed to Daily Mirror's King that "there was a lot to do, it was quite strange." She recalled that production took hours to fit her dress, style her hair and apply her make-up in time for the scenes. Laura's dress is called "Tiffany" and was made by the company, Pronuptia de Paris. It is a slub silk dress that features full tiered skirt that is lace trimmed. The boned bodice has cross hatch piping and has detachable sleeves. At the time of the wedding's broadcast, Laura's dress cost £419. The wedding was filmed on a sunny day on location at a Liverpool church. They also filmed scenes of them exiting the church to guests throwing confetti over them. Cunliffe recalled that it was a "weird" experience playing the wedding scene as "everyone fussed over the bride." Pinner was glad to have the wedding scenes finished, adding that it was "nice to get it over with at last."

=== Departure and death ===
On 18 August 1987, it was announced that Cunliffe had decided to not have her contract with the show renewed. Cunliffe's departure coincided with numerous other regular cast departures including, Damon Grant (Simon O'Brien), Doreen Corkhill (Kate Fitzgerald) and Pat Hancock (David Easter). This led newspapers to claim there were issues within production but these allegations were denied. Cunliffe told Daily Mirror's Irwin that she feared being typecast and did not want to remain in the same role for too long. Her decision issued a dilemma to scriptwriters who had planned a long-term future for Laura and Jonathan. Pinner agreed to his contract renewal but Cunliffe's decision meant that Laura needed to be written out with short notice.

Pinner told Knight that Cunliffe did not want to remain in the show for another year and felt that filming in Liverpool was too far from her home in London. Pinner confirmed that Cunliffe's decision shocked the production team, he added "everyone was gobsmacked when she left." Pinner was nervous about his job security after Cunliffe left because it was unclear if Jonathan would be kept on in the series without Laura. In an interview in The Weekly News, Pinner said he understood Cunliffe's decision to leave. He knew the easiest way to write Laura out would be her and Jonathan leaving the show together. Pinner explained "for a while it looked as though my stay would be cut short, I had some anxious moments as I waited to see how the problem would be resolved." A Daily Mirror report claimed that executive producer Phil Redmond was annoyed with Cunliffe for ruining the show's plans for Laura and Jonathan. He retaliated by having Cunliffe play the rest of contracted episodes as Laura in a hospital bed. They added that Laura would become a "vegetable". Cunliffe filmed her final scenes as Laura in early October 1987. A Liverpool Echo reporter revealed that producers had decided to kill the character off. They hired out part of a ward inside a Merseyside hospital to film her deathbed scenes following a brain haemorrhage.

Laura's departure storyline begins after Geoff repairing a cracked light switch on the landing above their stairs. In an episode set on Laura's 24th birthday, she has a bath to prepare for a dinner date with Jonathan. Laura gets out of the bath and switches the light on and the switch electrocutes her which sends her crashing down the stairs. In the aftermath of Laura's accident they remain unaware that Geoff's faulty repairs to the light switch caused Laura's condition. Jonathan later receives an electric shock from the light switch and he realises the cause of her fall. Geoff and Dorothy are depicted at odds with Jonathan about Laura's condition. They believe Laura will recover but Jonathan is "more realistic" and begins to consider putting Laura forward for organ donation. They also become angry with him for Terry Sullivan (Brian Regan) to move in with him while Laura is unconscious in hospital. In January 1988 episodes, Laura is declared brain dead and her family accept her as an organ donor before her life support machine is removed and switched off. After Laura's death, Jonathan is prepared to lie at her inquest to save Geoff from knowing he inadvertently caused his own daughter's death. Cunliffe made her final appearance as Laura during the episode broadcast on 4 January 1988.

Jonathan never informs Geoff about the truth surrounding Laura's death. Writers teased viewers in a later storyline, in which Geoff is angry with Jonathan for allowing Donna Gibson (Dianne Michaels) and Cheryl Boyanowsky (Jennifer Calvert) to live with him. He accuses Jonathan of being responsible and threatens to order a new inquest into Laura's death. Terry intervenes and stops Jonathan from telling Geoff what really happened.

== Reception ==
Christopher Tookey from The Sunday Telegraph branded Laura a "warm hearted solicitor, northern accent, hopeless romantic." Tookey believed that Laura's anxieties about her wedding appeared "consumerist" and thought she was worried about other characters seeing her "purely as a commodity". Ken Irwin from Daily Mirror branded Laura a "well-to-do solicitor" and opined that Cunliffe brought "a touch of class to Britain's most famous Close." Upon Laura and Jonathan's arrival, a Daily Express critic proclaimed "the yuppies are back in the Close" and described them as "another young professional duo, looking forward to getting wed this summer from Heather’s jinxed house." In the book, "The Guinness Book of Classic British TV", it was noted that while Jonathan and Laura's marriage lasted longer than others, their "union was doomed" and ended in an unconventional manner. Lorna Hughes from the Manchester Evening News included Laura electrocuting herself and her later death in their forgotten Brookside storylines feature. She added that Laura and Jonathan "were Brookside's resident young professional couple in the late 80s." In December 1992, an Inside Soap journalist labelled Laura and Jonathan as "another yuppie couple" and believed their relationship was "just as doomed" as Heather's romances were. In April 1993, Laura's death and Jonathan's subsequent grief was featured in the magazine readers' "favourite soap memory" feature. In May 1996, Inside Soap reporters included Laura's death in their "golden moment in soap" feature. They profiled Laura and Jonathan stating "before the arrival of the Farnhams, the Gordon-Davies held the title of resident yuppies." They added that their arrival shocked the other residents of Brookside Close and described their house as a "posh pad with sponged walls and cane furniture." All About Soap included Laura's death and Jonathan becoming widowed in their feature profiling Brookside's "most memorable moments". Francesca Babb assessed that duo's "happiness wasn't to be" as Jonathan "faced a future alone".

Hilary Kingsley, writing for Sunday Mirror believed that the Gordon-Davies' portrayed different issues to the rest of the Brookside characters. She assessed that "handsome, double-barrelled Jonathan marries lovely liberated Laura. They're lawyers, well-off and not ashamed of it. Their problems are light-years away from those of the old Brookside working-class guard." Referencing Laura and Jonathan's first argument scenes, Moira Martingale from Liverpool Echo wrote "if all the sickly cooing of Jonathan and Laura is really getting up your nose, take heart. This week they have a disagreement.. about art." With Laura's final months on the show depicting her confined to a hospital bed, another Liverpool Echo's critic opined that "next to Mrs Bates from Emmerdale Farm, Laura must be the most inanimate soap star to pop up on the screen at regular intervals."

Chris Stratford from The News chose Laura and Jonathan's debut episode in the newspaper's "today's choice" television feature. Stratford noted the unlucky track record of marriages in number 9 Brookside Close and hoped the Gordon-Davies' would fare better. A Shropshire Star reporter branded it "the wedding of the week" in their write up. The wedding episode was featured in Dewsbury Reporter's, Batley News' and Northamptonshire Evening Telegraph's "pick of the week" feature, in the latter of which Laura and Jonathan were branded the "Brookside yuppies". Derek Hooper writing for South Wales Echo described their ceremony as "like all weddings" that have "plenty of last-minute panics to cope with." John Russell writing for Sunday Express opined that the "yuppie inmates" wedding was an "uncharacteristically happy" edition of Brookside. He quipped it was a "perfectly normal Liverpool wedding" complete with a large inflatable gorilla. Russell concluded "much more of this good cheer and viewers will start liking the characters." Johnny Kennedy from Liverpool Echo believed their marriage would not last but branded it "a highly entertaining bit of telly with a lot of laughs". Kennedy noted that Laura's initial indecision and the panicking characters added to drama.

Of Laura's electrocution, Peterborough Evening Telegraph critic assessed "high drama bursts into the peaceful life of Brookside Close." Bernice Saltzer from Hartlepool Mail agreed it was "high drama" and praised Brookside for its efforts. She noted that the soap portrayed this type of drama better than its rival show, EastEnders. However, Saltzer was negative about Laura and Cunliffe's portrayal. She scathed that Laura's death and departure is "no bad thing" because Cunliffe "is possibly the worst actress in the programme." She added "her performance last night – when she lay on her hall floor for the majority of the time before being carted off in an ambulance – was only slightly less animated than usual!" A Burton Mail critic branded Laura and Jonathan "those two yukky yuppies" and opined that their barbeque party dominated the episode but their featured party guests were all characters viewers had never seen before. Roy West (Liverpool Echo) revealed a consensus amongst television critics was that the show had "gone soft" due to "soppy storylines like the Jonathan and Laura romance taking over." Redmond defended his show and noted Brookside was still portraying difficult social issues. Kathryn Milner from The News believed that Brookside's storylines were both real and unrealistic. She explained that they "fall in tension and expertise" ranging from "real" storylines "to the far-fetched and annoying wedding plans of the new lawyer couple, Jonathan and Laura. Followers of the Brookside cult are now watching with interest to see what the script-writers will do to brighten up the bourgeois boredom of these two young people." Naomi Marks from The News held similar views on Laura and described Geoff being responsible for Laura's fall as a "cruel twist of irony". She added it was "a welcome, long-overdue ploy" by writers that "renewed interest" in the show. Marks opined that Brookside was risking a decline in ratings with the story and viewers wanted doctors to turn off Laura's life-support machine to escape her. She reasoned that "soap characters have to be loveable, despicable, or the source of constant intrigue to keep the discerning addict transfixed. Laura was none of these – she was merely irritating at the best of times."
