= Gordon Collins (Brookside) =

Fictional character from Brookside

- Brookside character
- Mark Burgess as Gordon
- Portrayed by: Nigel Crowley (1982–1984); Mark Burgess (1986–1990)
- Duration: 1982–1984, 1986–1990
- First appearance: 2 November 1982
- Last appearance: 11 June 1990
- Created by: Phil Redmond
In-universe information
- Occupation: Student; Furniture restorer Car salesman Wine salesman
- Father: Paul Collins
- Mother: Annabelle Collins
- Sisters: Lucy Collins
- Grandfathers: Jack Harvey
- Grandmothers: Mona Fallon
- Uncles: Teddy Harvey

Gordon Collins is a character in the Channel 4 soap opera Brookside. He was portrayed by Nigel Crowley from the show's debut in 1982 until 1984 and later on by Mark Burgess beginning in 1986 and ending with his departure in 1990. Gordon is notable for being the first openly gay character on a British television soap opera.

== Storylines ==
Gordon Collins moved to Brookside Close aged 14 with his family in 1982, after his father, Paul (Jim Wiggins), loses his job. While Lucy (Katrin Cartlidge) struggles to fit in on Brookside Close, which she refers to as "purgatory", Gordon settles in more quickly. Gordon is seen by Paul and his mother, Annabelle (Doreen Sloane), as having better prospects than Lucy, and so, when they can afford to allow only one to remain at independent school, Gordon stays, while Lucy has to attend the sixth-form college at Brookside Comprehensive, where she is bullied.

After the Collins' arrival, Gordon begins writing computer software, a hobby shared by Alan Partridge (Dicken Ashworth). For some time, he gave his parents little cause for concern, unlike Lucy, who was having an affair with a married man much to Annabelle and Paul's disapproval. Gordon also provided a contrast to Damon Grant (Simon O'Brien), who was his counterpart in the Grant family. While Damon was hot-headed, often skipped school and spent his time on the football terraces and getting into scrapes with his friends, Gordon was quiet, studious and appeared to have few friends.

In 1985, Gordon came out as gay after Annabelle found out about the homosexual relationship he had been having with Chris Duncan (Stifyn Parri). While Annabelle and Paul eventually accepted his homosexuality, it was a source of embarrassment for them. In 1986, Gordon leaves to live in France with Lucy, who had been living there with Barry Grant (Paul Usher) for some time. Gordon returns with a girl, prompting Paul and Annabelle to assume he is now straight. This, however, is not the case, and it transpires that the girl is the sister of a lover Gordon had in France.

In 1987, Gordon and Chris come into possession of a stolen car, with which they run over the dog that Paul saved from drowning. Paul, however, assumes that Terry Sullivan (Brian Regan) killed the dog, photographs him and Pat Hancock (David Easter) working, and sends the evidence to the DSS.

In 1988, the Collins' house is attacked by "queer-bashers", who graffiti "If AIDS don't get you – we will' and "shirtlifters live here" on the garage door.

== Reception ==
Geoffrey Phillips of the Evening Standard branded the character "Gordon the glum". In 1986, Eleanor Levy from Record Mirror profiled the Collins family and claimed "Gordon is the only sensible one among them", but added it was not "much fun" for Gordon having ginger hair. In 1989, Johnny Dee from the publication stated that a "memorable moment" for the character was "the original Gordon going into a pub for a pint of bitter beer". Of his recast, Dee opined that the Collins family were too preoccupied even to notice he looked different and paid him attention only when they discovered he is gay. In the 1996 book The Guinness Book of Classic British TV, Brookside was criticised for its portrayal of Gordon. It was noted that "the series had been more circumspect in the inclusion of a regular gay character: it was unfortunate that it was Gordon Collins, with his public school background, pandering somewhat to stereotyping".
