= Jonathan Gordon-Davies =

Fictional character from the Channel 4 soap opera Brookside

- Brookside character
- Portrayed by: Steven Pinner
- Duration: 1987–1990
- First appearance: 6 April 1987
- Last appearance: 31 October 1990
In-universe information
- Occupation: Solicitor
- Father: Arthur Gordon-Davies
- Mother: Helen Gordon-Davies
- Wife: Laura Wright (1987–1988); Helen Massey (off-screen)
- Aunts: Jeannie

Jonathan Gordon-Davies is a fictional character from the British Channel 4 soap opera Brookside, played by Steven Pinner. The character debuted on-screen during the episode broadcast on 6 April 1987. Pinner was cast in the series after a period of unemployment and he credited the role as being his saviour from depression. Jonathan is characterised as an upper class solicitor from a wealthy family in London. Writers created Jonathan alongside his fiancée Laura Wright (Jane Cunliffe). Together they represented the young urban professionals (yuppies) of 1980/1990s British society. The two characters move into number nine Brookside Close, the house previously occupied by similar upper class character Heather Haversham (Amanda Burton). Writers created a wedding story for them, which was broadcast on 11 August 1987 and commemorated the 500th episode of Brookside. Jonathan was portrayed at odds with his interfering father-in-law Geoff Wright (Arthur Kelly). He would invite himself into Jonathan's home and perform DIY home improvements to Jonathan's chagrin. His faulty repair of a light switch causes Laura to electrocute herself and fall down some stairs. The story formed Cunliffe's departure from the series after less than one year on-screen. Laura was killed off in January 1988, but writers decided to develop Jonathan's character further.

He gained housemates and friends when Terry Sullivan (Brian Regan) and later Sue Harper (Annie Miles) move in with him. Jennifer Calvert was introduced as Jonathan's new love interest, Canadian national Cheryl Boyanowsky. Producers spared no expense at creating an international love affair between the two. They filmed their first meeting in Austria, on-screen depicted as a skiing trip. Cheryl later visits Jonathan in Liverpool before returning to Canada. Producers then ordered production to commence in the Canadian city Vancouver to further develop their romance. Pinner enjoyed portraying Jonathan's travels and Cheryl returns to England to live with Jonathan. However, writers marred their romance with tension caused by their housemates Sue and Terry. Their relationship culminated following Calvert's departure and by 1990, Jonathan was portrayed as restless in his life. The character's final stories included Terry accusing him of having an affair with Sue and selling his solicitors partnership. Pinner made his departure from the series in 1990 and Jonathan moves to London with his new lover Helen Massey (Colette Stevenson). Pinner's final appearance as Jonathan was broadcast on 31 October 1990.

== Casting ==
Pinner joined the cast of Brookside in 1987. He was introduced alongside Jane Cunliffe, who plays his fiancée Laura Wright, and they debuted on-screen during episodes broadcast April 1987. Pinner received the role after a prolonged period of unemployment. Not working caused him to become depressed and he moved back in with his parents in Bournemouth. After a few weeks of being home, Pinner secured the role of Jonathan. Pinner attended an interview about the role in London and within a week he had received the role, attended costume fittings and began filming for the role. he told a reporter from Daily Echo that he recalled feeling he had done well in his audition and after that "it all happened very quickly".

Jonathan was introduced alongside his partner, Laura, and the two characters planned to marry. Cunliffe had already been cast as Laura when Pinner auditioned for Jonathan. He was required to act out domestic style scenes and casting directors were satisfied the two were a good match to work together. Pinner believed that he and Cunliffe fitted into the established cast well, adding that "they are a great bunch of people; both Jane and myself were made welcome." It was his first significant television role and one Pinner credited as being therapeutic. He told Mike Hrano of TVTimes that when he needed it the most, "Brookside rescued me, not only in a professional sense but also on a personal level." Both Pinner and Cunliffe's casting and their character details were announced on 2 April 1987. A Brookside publicist told a reporter from Daily Record that the soap wanted "to show Brookside is not full of scouse characters." Pinner's debut appearance as Jonathan occurred during the Monday episode broadcast on 6 April 1987.

== Development ==
=== Characterisation and marriage ===
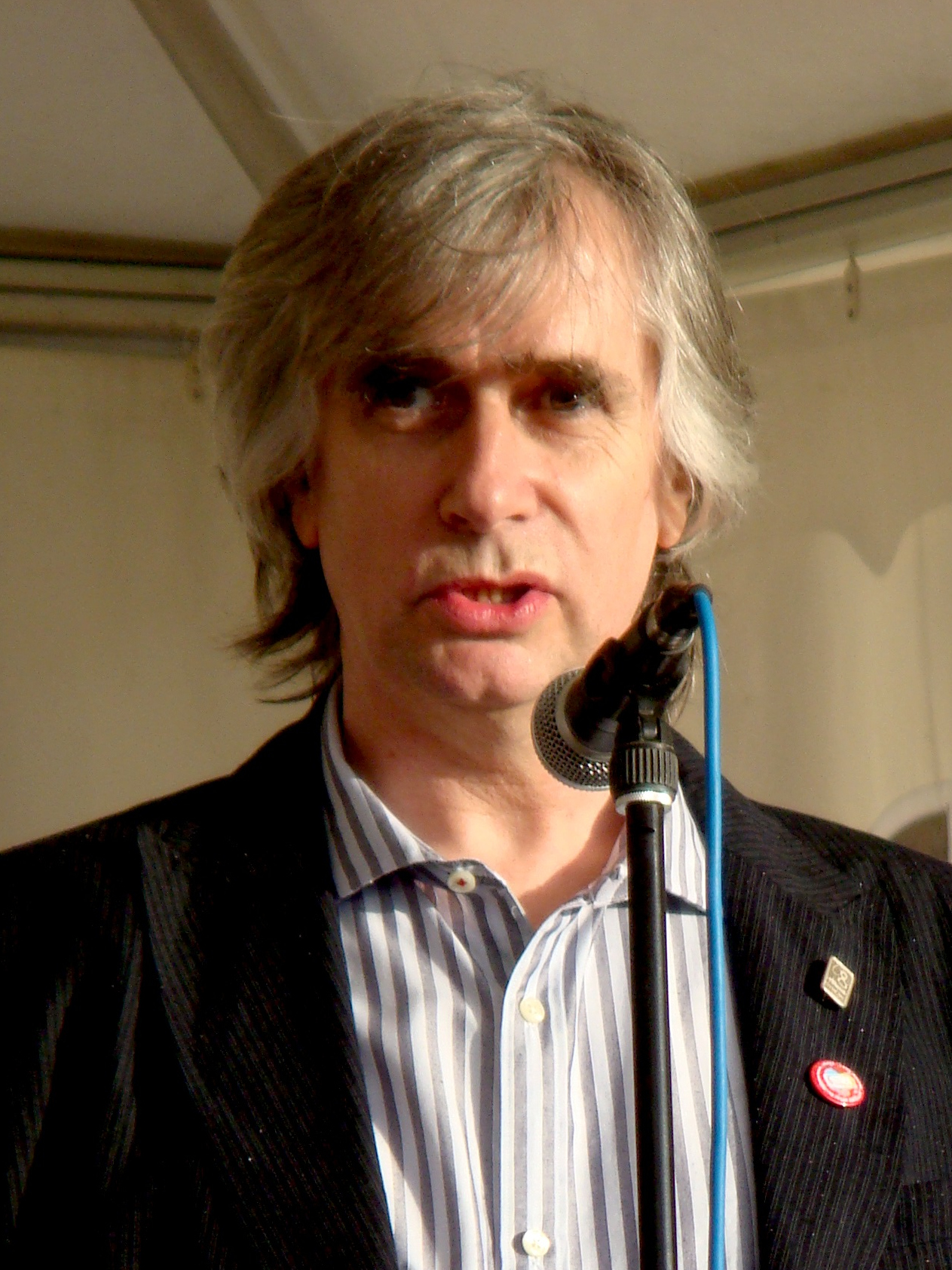
Brookside creator Phil Redmond (pictured) characterised Jonathan as a solicitor, attracted to the profession's social status and an appealing salary.

Jonathan is characterised as an upper class male, working as a solicitor. Jonathan is an enterprising person, he is emphatic and aware. Pinner relished the role and learned from his character but also believed his own experiences could further develop Jonathan's persona. He told Hrano from TVTimes that "when you play any new character, some of what comes out of that person you keep yourself. Jonathan is a lot sharper than I was, and in that sense he has been a help to me. But I believe he can learn something from me too." In the book, Brookside: The Official Companion, the show's creator Phil Redmond described Jonathan "attracted to the profession by its social status and appealing salary". Upon his arrival, he works for an "established and highly respectable practice" in Liverpool. In his backstory, Jonathan is detailed as coming from a wealthy family. He was educated at a public school and qualified as a solicitor a two years prior to his arrival on Brookside Close. Jonathan is originally from London and he attended Liverpool University, where he met Laura. Redmond stated that Jonathan is "devoted" to Laura. Despite his devotion to her, Jonathan was unsure about remaining in Liverpool and wanted to return to London. He also described them as "young achievers who like their Volvo 340 are safe, solid and reliable." Pinner's accent differs slightly to Jonathan's with his being less upper class sounding. Jonathan and Laura are featured in various domestic argument scenes and Pinner initially found these difficult because he did not like to raise his voice. Pinner told Andrew Knight from Evening Express that upon watching Jonathan's early scenes back, he realised that Jonathan was sounding too quiet and spoke too fast. Pinner rectified this and Jonathan's dialogue was altered as he became more relaxed in the role.

Like Jonathan, Laura is portrayed as a "yuppie" and a solicitor, but she is from a working-class background. Redmond stated that unlike Jonathan, Laura has a greater social conscience. He added "it is at this point that her ideals begin to differ from those Jonathan abides by." When they are introduced into the series, writers moved them into number 9 Brookside Close. The house was previously occupied by a similar character, Heather Haversham (Amanda Burton). Writers used the pair's wedding preparations to create tension between the couple. Jonathan was eager to finish decorating their new home and a hand injury delayed his plans. Jonathan dreaded Laura's interfering father Geoff Wright (Arthur Kelly) noticing their unfinished home and taking over. He also disliked Laura's sister Joanne Wright (Carleen Lundon) being around their house too often and he begins to bemoan the Wright family. The two were often portrayed arguing, but unlike other Brookside characters who would resort to obscene behaviour and language, their bickering was more sarcastic and civilised. When Jonathan drives their car into a large pothole on Brookside Close, Laura questions whether they have made a mistake moving into the area. She postpones their wedding to concentrate on a legal case. Jonathan becomes annoyed with Laura prioritising her work over their relationship. Jonathan and Geoff finish decorating the house and a new wedding date is set. Writers quickly developed their relationship and the two characters were married just months after their introduction. Producers also used their wedding to celebrate the show's 500th episode, which was broadcast on 11 August 1987. Jonathan gave Laura an unusual wedding gift when he presented her with a forty-foot inflatable gorilla. Pinner told Evening Express' Knight that "we had a lot of fun together and I enjoyed the build up to the wedding immensely."

Cunliffe decided to not have her contract with the show renewed because she could not commit to another year. Pinner revealed that Cunliffe's decision shocked the production team, adding that "everyone was gobsmacked when she left." Pinner was nervous about his job security after Cunliffe left because it was unclear if Jonathan would be kept on in the series without Laura. Producers decided to kill Laura off after she had only been in the series for months. The story began when Laura's parents Geoff and Dorothy (Jacqueline Morgan) continue to interfere offering home improvements to Jonathan's home. Geoff decides to attempt to repair a faulty double light switch in the upstairs hallway. Laura later switches the light on and is electrocuted. The force of the electric shock sends Laura tumbling down the stairs. Jonathan later returns home and finds Laura unconscious and slumped behind the front door. She is hospitalised and remains in a coma for three months. Jonathan resides himself to the fact Laura will not regain consciousness. His attitude causes a rift with Geoff and Dorothy, who fume at him when he allows Terry Sullivan (Brian Regan) to move in. They accuse Jonathan of giving up on their daughter and Geoff begins blaming other people for causing Laura's accident. Jonathan realises that Geoff caused the accident after he receives an electric shock from the faulty light switch. He refrains from revealing to truth to spare him the guilt. In episodes airing in January 1988, doctors declare Laura as braindead and they remove her life support. At the inquest into her death, Jonathan lies about Geoff's involvement to spare him any more suffering. Pinner enjoyed filming the scenes with Cunliffe, which were set in an actual hospital intensive care ward. Discussing Jonathan and Laura's time on the show, Pinner told Nick Fisher from TV Guide that "as an actor, the build up to the wedding was best. And also the coma stuff, although I think it went on too long. It was all shot in intensive care, which was a bit heavy." He told Knight that he recalled filming Laura's hospital scenes for six week began to wear him down as an actor.

=== Relationship with Cheryl Boyanowsky ===
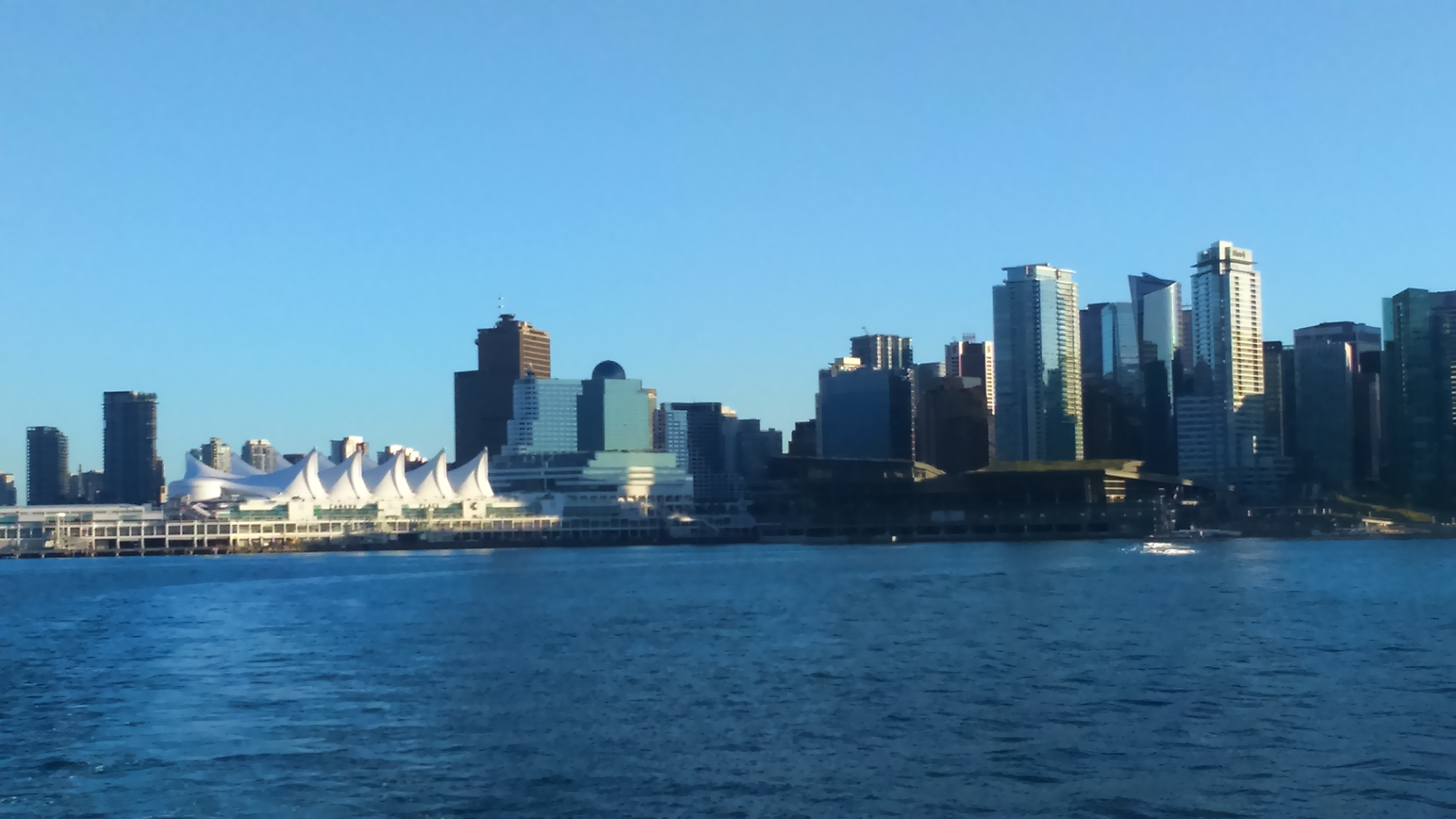
Scenes for Jonathan and Cheryl's romance were filmed on location in Vancouver, Canada. (pictured)

In 1988, producers expanded the character's development. They created a new love interest for him and ordered location filming to accommodate it. Unlike other soap operas, Brookside would film in different countries if a character went on holiday. The first was when Jonathan and Terry go on a skiing holiday actually filmed in Austria. There they meet Donna Gibson (Dianne Michaels) and her friend Cheryl Boyanowsky (Jennifer Calvert), who are both from Canada. Jonathan spends the beginning of their trip upset about Laura. He begins spending time with Cheryl, who cheers him up because she is a good listener. After their holiday ends, Cheryl and Donna come to stay with Jonathan and Terry which causes conflict with other characters. Sue Harper (Annie Miles) becomes jealous of Donna and Terry spending time together. Then Geoff is angry that two women are staying with Jonathan and Geoff accuses him of causing Laura's death. Terry intervenes and stops Jonathan telling Geoff the truth about the faulty switch.

The next phase of Jonathan's development with Cheryl resulted in larger location shoot in Vancouver, Canada. The story plays out on-screen as follows: When Cheryl leaves, Jonathan realises that he misses her and travels to Vancouver to find her. He locates her at a university where he learns that Cheryl is due to marry Professor Benwall Deburau (Jackson Davies). Jonathan refuses to accept that she will marry Deburau and recalls her interest in studying at the Manchester Business School. Jonathan then interrupts Cheryl's wedding rehearsal and convinces her to break up with Deburau and begin a relationship with him instead. Producing and filming episodes of Brookside in Vancouver was a large scale operation for the show. The show's creator and executive producer Phil Redmond accompanied the cast and crew during filming. Filming usually took place in Liverpool during the hours of 7:00 AM to 8:00 PM but in Canada, they extended the working hours. The cast and crew made their Canadian base at the Pan Pacific hotel in Canada Place. Filming also took place during Vancouver's hottest day of the year. Actress Jennifer Calvert is originally from Canada and filming in the country meant that she was reunited with her family after eighteen months. Calvert's mother, father, grandfather and husband were all allowed to observe filming.

In one scene Jonathan and Cheryl are depicted relaxing with a meal at a waterside location. The cast and crew took a forty-minute ferry ride to Gibsons. Redmond arrived by air travel and checked upon the production progress. There he told Hrano (TVTimes) that he was worried about the finalised product. Brookside had previously filmed episodes on the Caribbean island Barbados and viewers had incorrectly accused the show of filming in Stockport. He told Hrano that "all I'm worried about is that the crew don't make this place look like Stoke [...] hopefully, people will realise this time we didn't build the Rockies especially for Brookside." Another significant scene was filmed on a Vancouver beach and Pinner and Calvert were required to enter the Salish Sea. Directors ordered the scene to be a passionate kiss in the sea. The "snog" was a statement to viewers that the characters had begun a serious relationship. Calvert enjoyed filming in Canada with Pinner. She told Hrano that "it's a bit like a dream. Steven is so great to work with. We really enjoy each other's company." Pinner later told Nick Fisher from TV Guide that filming in Canada was "the most exciting time".

On-screen, Jonathan returns to Liverpool and Cheryl later moves in with him and she is accepted into the business school. Jonathan continues to share his home with Cheryl, Terry and Sue. Despite this, Laura's presence is still felt. Jonathan faces the prospect of losing Cheryl their Christmas tree catches fire and Terry and Cheryl are trapped and pass out from smoke inhalation. They survive and Cheryl urges Jonathan to redecorate their home to forget about Laura. The house fire accident was written with similar circumstances to the accident that had previously killed Laura. Jonathan was not home to protect his lover and both women had been using the bathroom. Writers used Sue and Terry to create conflict between conflict between Cheryl and Jonathan. Sue gets pregnant with Martin Howes' (Andrew Hall) baby, Cheryl learns the truth but agrees to keep her secret. Jonathan notices tension between the pair and guesses that Martin is the father. He tells Cheryl that she must tell Terry. The tension causes Cheryl to issue him an ultimatum, either they move out or she will break up with him. He agrees and offers to rent his home out to Terry and Sue so he can rent a flat with Cheryl. When Jonathan fails to show up for a flat viewing because of work, Cheryl packs her belongings and flees to Canada. Jonathan blames Sue for Cheryl's departure and threatens to reveal her secrets. Cheryl arranges for her items to be sent to her. Jonathan notices that the removal firm use an address in Manchester and he tracks her down. Jonathan convinces Cheryl to reconcile but Calvert was due to leave Brookside. In the episodes prior to her departure, Jonathan becomes reflective over Sue and Terry's wedding and realises he wants the same with Cheryl. He asks her to marry him and declared that he wanted to start a family with her, Cheryl refuses and breaks up with him for good.

=== Departure ===
Pinner left the series in 1990. In the build up to his departure, Jonathan decides to sell number nine and Terry accuses him of breaking his promise, reminding him that he saved Cheryl's life during the house fire. Jonathan insists he needs the funds to buy Sarah Townes' (Julianne White) half of their business and goes into partnership with Viv Slater (Hilary Drake). Producers also decided to ruin Jonathan's friendship with Terry and reveal Sue's secrets. Doctors tell Terry he is unable to father children and he realises that he is not Danny's father. Barry Grant (Paul Usher) convinces Terry that Jonathan must be Danny's biological father and Terry attacks his friend. Jonathan is forced to tell Terry that Sue had an affair with Martin and he is the actual father. Jonathan decides to disband his partnership with Viv and he meets Helen Massey (Colette Stevenson) when he goes for an interview with a Japanese law firm. He agrees to sell his house to Terry and Sue before leaving to live in London with Helen. Pinner made his final appearance as Jonathan during the episode broadcast on 31 October 1990. In the 1994 book, Phil Redmond's Brookside - Life in the Close, it was revealed that Jonathan was still living in London. It was also detailed that Jonathan and Helen had married off-screen and had two children together.

== Reception ==
Mike Hrano from TVTimes branded Jonathan a "decisive go-getter" type of character. Jonathan assumed the role as one of the soap opera's first leading males to be given the "heart-throb" moniker. Pinner found being referred this as embarrassing. Discussing this, Pinner told Hrano that "there are hundreds of good-looking guys out there, but because my character is on the TV and comes into people's homes, it puts me in the spotlight. That's all it is." In the book Phil Redmond's Brookside - Life in the Close, author Geoff Tibballs stated that Jonathan was "born to sulk". He added that Jonathan and Laura "niggled at each other constantly" and quipped that the money minded pairing would "charge double time if the argument extended outside office hours." Profiling the house fire and electrocution accidents, Tiballs quipped that Jonathan "had an unfortuante habit of never being in the house when he was needed."

Lorna Hughes from the Manchester Evening News included Laura's death and Jonathan moving on with Cheryl in their forgotten Brookside storylines feature. Of the characters she stated "Jonathan Gordon-Davies and wife Laura were Brookside's resident young professional couple in the late 80s." In April 1993, writers of Inside Soap featured Laura's death and Jonathan's grief in their readers' "favourite soap memory" write up, which also praised Pinner's portrayal of Jonathan. In May 1996, Inside Soap reporters included Laura's death in their "golden moment in soap" feature. Of Jonathan and Laura, they stated that "before the arrival of the Farnhams, the Gordon-Davies held the title of resident yuppies." They added that their arrival shocked the other residents of Brookside Close and described their house as a "posh pad with sponged walls and cane furniture." Another journalist from the magazine branded Jonathan and Laura "another yuppie couple" and opined that their relationship was "just as doomed" as Heather's romances were. A writer from Soap branded Jonathan a luckless character whose life was ruined by moving to Brookside Close. They added that "he understandably left the district." Francesca Babb from All About Soap included Laura's death and Jonathan becoming widowed in their "most memorable moments" of Brookside feature. She added that the couple's "happiness wasn't to be" and Jonathan "faced a future alone". In the book, "The Guinness Book of Classic British TV", it was noted that while Jonathan and Laura's marriage lasted longer than others, their "union was doomed" and ended in an unconventional manner.
