= Episode 500 (Brookside) =

- Brookside episode
- Episode no.: Season 1 Episode 500
- Directed by: Peter Boisseau
- Written by: Frank Cottrell-Boyce
- Original air date: 11 August 1987
- Running time: 25 minutes

Guest appearances
- Nicholas Donovan as Richard Almond; Arthur Kelly as Geoff Wright; Jacqueline Morgan as Dorothy Wright; Carleen Lundon as Joanne Wright; Timothy Bateson as Arthur Gordon-Davies; Beth Ellis as Helen Gordon-Davies; Mia Soteriou as Rebecca Smith; Dean Sullivan as Jimmy Corkhill

Episode chronology
← Previous; Episode 499	Next → Episode 501

Episode 500 of the British television soap opera Brookside was first broadcast on Channel 4 on 11 August 1987. The episode was written by Frank Cottrell-Boyce and directed by Peter Boisseau. The plot mainly focuses on the wedding between Jonathan Gordon-Davies (Steven Pinner) and Laura Wright (Jane Cunliffe). It also has a sub-plot featuring Billy Corkhill (John McArdle) preparing to participate in an armed robbery and using the wedding reception for his alibi. His wife, Doreen Corkhill (Kate Fitzgerald) tries to uncover Billy's plans which leads to an argument. The wedding ceremony was filmed on location at a real Merseyside church. Cunliffe and Pinner were styled in traditional wedding attire. Cunliffe found the experience of filming a wedding a "weird" experience. Episode 500 formed part of Brookside and Mersey Television's fifth anniversary week celebrations. The episode also received new titles and end credits. The episode was well received by television critics with Laura and Jonathan's wedding storyline gaining favour. The episode was chosen in several newspapers "pick of the week" features.

== Plot ==
Richard Almond (Nicholas Donovan) helps Jonathan Gordon-Davies (Steven Pinner) to get ready for his wedding to Laura Wright (Jane Cunliffe). Jonathan worries when Dorothy Wright (Jacqueline Morgan) reveals that Laura has gone missing. Doreen Corkhill (Kate Fitzgerald) and Billy Corkhill (John McArdle) get ready for the wedding but Billy sneaks out in his car. Richard tries to convince Jonathan he has been jilted but Jonathan remains hopeful Laura will arrive. Harry Cross (Bill Dean) gifts Jonathan tomatoes to wrangle an invite to the wedding. Jonathan tells Harry the wedding is cancelled and he offers to inform the neighbours. Billy goes to a garage to inspect a getaway car he plans to drive in an armed robbery. He changes the tyre and stains his shirt.

Laura arrives home, apologises and still wants to marry Jonathan. She asks Jonathan to walk down the aisle with him instead of her father, Geoff Wright (Arthur Kelly), giving her away. Jonathan asks Harry to lend him a collar stud in exchange for him attending the reception. He asks Terry Sullivan (Brian Regan) to install a surprise gift for Laura. Jonathan is excited when he sees Laura in her wedding dress and they go to the church. Laura's family wait outside the church and Geoff disagrees with Laura breaking tradition but does accept her choice. Billy arrives home and Doreen berates him for going missing. Jonathan and Laura marry, come out of the church to celebration and have their wedding photographs taken. Billy and Doreen arrive outside the church, having missed the ceremony she orders him to take her home.

Everyone attends the wedding reception and Geoff gives a speech. Doreen is upset with Billy for making her miss the wedding. Billy argues for them to go to the wedding reception but Doreen is too embarrassed. Doreen accuses Billy of being involved in crime and he forces Doreen to go to the reception. Terry inflates an eight-foot gorilla on the front lawn of the Gordon-Davies house. Billy tries to talk to numerous wedding guests, including Arthur Gordon-Davies (Timothy Bateson) and Rebecca Smith (Mia Soteriou) to make him self known and gain an alibi. Doreen talks with Doreen talks with Dorothy and Helen Gordon-Davies (Beth Ellis) but she is worried she cannot find Billy. Everyone gathers around the inflatable gorilla for wedding speeches, where Jimmy Corkhill (Dean Sullivan) tries to find his brother, Billy. Jimmy warns Doreen that he thinks Billy is in trouble and Doreen accuses Jimmy of knowing more. Jonathan and Laura celebrate on Brookside Close and set off for their honeymoon. Billy collects the getaway car and drives to the meeting point where he is visibly nervous.

== Production ==
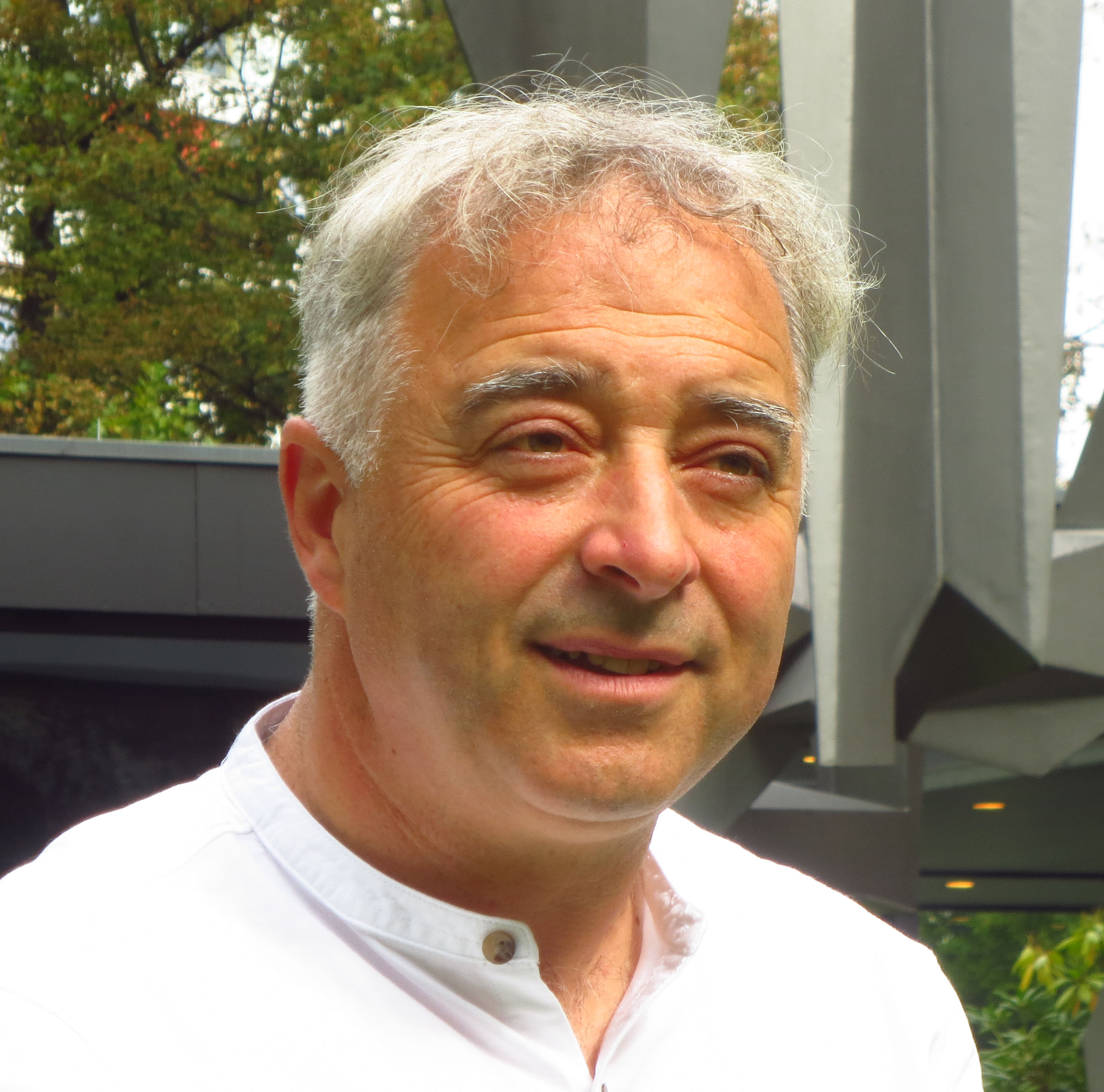
Frank Cottrell-Boyce wrote Episode 500.

The episode was written by Frank Cottrell-Boyce and directed by Peter Boisseau. Stuart Doughty served as its producer and Phil Redmond as the executive producer. The main storyline in Episode 500 is the wedding of Jonathan Gordon-Davies (Steven Pinner) and Laura Wright (Jane Cunliffe). The episode's sub-plot features Billy Corkhill (John McArdle) using the wedding reception as an alibi for himself during a planned robbery. Billy stands to gain £3000 by acting as a getaway driver.

In the wedding storyline, Jonathan and Laura had been planning their ceremony from their introduction in April 1987. Pinner was ambiguous about whether or not the duo would eventually marry. He explained to Sharon Thomas from Birmingham Daily News that the characters "tell everyone in the Close that we are decorating the house ready for the wedding, but we'll have to see." The duo continued planning their wedding up until the ceremony in Episode 500. Pinner told Andrew Knight from Evening Express that he "enjoyed" filming "the build up to the wedding immensely". Writers ensured the storyline kept viewers guessing whether or not Laura would marry Jonathan or jilt him at the altar. In episode 499, Laura is depicted as being laid-back about wedding. Advance spoilers for the episode did not details the outcome of the wedding, but it was revealed that the characters would become embroiled in "dramatic conflict" in future stories. The wedding is successful as Jonathan and Laura marry.

Cunliffe was surprised by the amount of preparation the wedding scenes required. In an interview Daily Mirror's Susie King, Cunliffe recalled that "all the designers were fussing and running around." She then spent hours having her dress fitted alongside her hair and make-up being done for the scenes. The wardrobe department used the company, Pronuptia de Paris, to supply a wedding dress for the episode. They chose a slub silk dress titled "Tiffany", which at the time retailed for £419. The attire featured a fully tiered skirt with lace trim, a boned bodice with cross hatch piping. It also had detachable sleeves which could be worn on or off the shoulder. They dressed Jonathan in traditional male wedding suit, including a black Oxford tailcoat and cavendish grey stripe trousers. These were sourced from Youngs Formal Wear. Jonathan and Laura opt for a church wedding. Production hired a real Merseyside church for location filming, which included exterior shots of the wedded characters outside the church having confetti thrown over them. The film shoot took place on a sunny day. Cunliffe found the experience of filming the wedding "weird" as "everyone fussed over the bride." Pinner recalled it was "nice to get it over with at last."

== Promotion and broadcast ==
A wedding photograph was issued to news outlets and printed in their publications in advance. Episode 500 has a run-time of approximately twenty-five minutes. It was originally broadcast on Channel 4 on Tuesday, 11 August 1987 in their 8 PM timeslot and was able to be viewed in Ireland. In Wales it was broadcast on Thursday 13 August 1987, on S4C at 6 PM. Episode 500 received altered opening titles and revamped end credits. The episode formed part of Brookside and its production company, Mersey Television's fifth anniversary week celebrations, which was marked on 10 August 1987. The company also hosted an anniversary party and other events across the week. Another event to celebrate the 500th episode was at Corner House on Oxford Street, Manchester, it featured talks from writers and actors from Brookside. A train was also renamed Brookside to honour its anniversary. The episode was made available by STV Group to watch via their STV Player streaming service from 4 December 2024.

== Reception ==
The wedding was the most favoured element of the episode. John Russell from Sunday Express wrote "what an uncharacteristically happy 500th anniversary programme from Brookside." Russell noted the episode did not rest on social issues but noted writers employed "the usual soap opera on-off charades" for the wedding. He was satirical about a seemingly "perfectly normal wedding" episode also including a giant inflatable gorilla and their neighbour Billy getting ready "for a spot of armed robbery". Johnny Kennedy from Liverpool Echo stated that he "enjoyed" Episode 500 and viewed it as "a highly entertaining bit of telly with a lot of laughs". A self-proclaimed joker, Kennedy added that it featured "some ideas I would have been proud of." Kennedy found Laura's initial indecision, Jonathan "going up the wall" over his attire and the panicking characters as added dramatic value to the episode. Roy West from publication predicted "the highlight will be Close's celebration of the wedding of yuppie couple Jonathan and Laura." Derek Hooper writing for South Wales Echo described their ceremony as "like all weddings" that have "plenty of last-minute panics to cope with." A Shropshire Star critic branded it "the wedding of the week" in their write up.

The wedding segment of the episode was included in television critics "pick of the week" features printed in the Batley News, Dewsbury Reporter and Northamptonshire Evening Telegraph newspapers. Phil Tusler from Birmingham Daily News also included the episode as the "pick of the week". He added "the problem for the Close is that there is no sign of Billy at the ceremony – or the bride come to that." A Lincolnshire Echo included it in their "TV highlights" feature. It was included in Liverpool Daily Post's "TV spotlight" feature.

A Edinburgh Evening News critic believed the episode "treated viewers to a celebration", adding that "the Close is alive with speculation, gossip, excitement and last-minute nerves and – as in all good soap operas – there is always the possibility of the unexpected happening." A Daily Express writer believed the episode promised "laughter and tears flowing like confetti". Christopher Tookey from The Sunday Telegraph stated that British soap operas traditionally favoured the view point of the underprivileged. Though, he believed that they were becoming more open to showcasing lives of the upwardly mobile characters. Tookey noted "even the soaps are upwardly mobile. The main anxiety in the 500th episode pf Brookside was whether or not nice young solicitor" Laura would marry Jonathan. Tookey added that Laura looked "positively fragrant" in her wedding dress. He concluded that "the only other hint of downward mobility" in the episode came from Billy using the reception for an alibi and sneaking around.
