= Paul Collins (Brookside) =

Fictional character from Brookside

- Brookside character
- Portrayed by: Jim Wiggins
- Duration: 1982–1990
- First appearance: 2 November 1982
- Last appearance: 25 June 1990
- Created by: Phil Redmond
In-universe information
- Occupation: Factory production manager
- Wife: Annabelle Collins
- Sons: Gordon Collins
- Daughters: Lucy Collins

Paul Collins is a fictional character from the British Channel 4 soap opera Brookside, played by Jim Wiggins. One of the show's original characters, Paul debuted during the episode broadcast on 2 November 1982. Wiggins was cast by Brookside creator Phil Redmond and Janet Goddard. Paul is introduced as the husband of Annabelle Collins (Doreen Sloane) and father to Gordon Collins (Nigel Crowley) and Lucy Collins (Katrin Cartlidge). Paul is characterised as an unlucky character who has been made redundant from a lucrative management role. He is forced to move to a small house on Brookside Close and change his lifestyle. Writers made him appear as a product of a different generation and an ex-army officer who had a sense of discipline instilled in him. Wiggins has described Paul as "aloof" and "conservative", which often made viewers unsympathetic to his plight.

Paul's stories include dealing with unemployment, depression and his son's homosexuality. He also contends with Lucy's wayward behaviour and a feud with Annabelle's mother, Mona Harvey (Margaret Clifton). Writers portrayed the Collins's marriage as a troubled one resulting in Annabelle having an affair with Brian Lawrence (Vincent Maguire). Paul forgives Annabelle and they get along better in the final stories. Producers decided to write out the entire Collins family following the death of Sloane in 1990. Paul's final storyline featured him and Annabelle moving to Lake District and opening a guest house. Paul last appeared during the episode broadcast on 25 June 1990.

== Development ==
=== Characterisation ===
As one of the original characters of Brookside, Wiggins was cast by Phil Redmond and Janet Goddard. In the book 20 years of Brookside, author Graham Kibble-White revealed that they intentionally cast "relative unknown" actors to create "an added element of freshness" for the show. Paul is characterised as a proud man who has his pride dented by unemployment. He believes that he is superior to jobseekers. Paul is an ex-army officer and the training he received in the role had instilled a "sense of discipline" in him. In a character profile published in TVTimes, Paul is described as "just been made redundant, and has been warned about heart strain and heavy drinking. His future looks bleak." It was also revealed that Paul is fifteen years older than his wife, Annabelle Collins (Doreen Sloane). In 1985, Wiggins told Eleanor Levy from the Record Mirror that Paul "means well - however misguided" he may seem.

Writers portrayed Paul as a product of a different generation. He wore British Home Stores clothing, failed to understand modern popular music and fashion trends. This left him unable to really have a rapport with his own children, let alone anyone else. Paul believed that the younger generation should still have the same discipline instilled in them that he had during his army days. Wiggins believed that Paul's characterisation often made viewers unsympathetic to his plight. He branded Paul's job loss as an "emotional" story, but viewers did not care about him being down on his luck. Wiggins told Nick Fisher from TV Guide that "I suppose it's because he's rather aloof and conservative, with a small c." Geoff Tibballs, author of Brookside - Life in the Close likened him to an "early Victor Meldrew" because he was likely to write a letter of complaint if he sensed any trouble.

=== Family issues ===
Paul and his family were forced to leave their large home on the Wirral and downsize to the smaller house, number eight Brookside Close. Upon their arrival they find their new home vandalised and the toilet stolen. Paul immediately accuses Damon Grant (Simon O'Brien) and this starts a feud with the Grant family. The Collinses had been used to "the good life" due to Paul's job as a production manager at Petrochem. Paul was made redundant when the company decided to remove management roles. Paul knew that living on Brookside Close would not be easy due to the small room sizes. Writers portrayed Paul and his wife Annabelle having to "grin and bear" their newfound predicament.

Paul is forced to attend his local job centre and sign up for financial support. In the book Brookside: The Official Companion, it described Paul becoming "depressed" and finding unemployment "unbearable". Additionally, "signing on was a weekly humiliation. It hurt his pride to stand queuing at the dole office with men and women he had once regarded as inferiors." Annabelle was more cheery about the situation and tried to help her husband, but he almost stopped talking.

The Collins children provided Paul with many of his storylines. Writers also used the Collins family to explore the issue of sexuality. Paul and Annabelle's son Gordon (Nigel Crowley, later Mark Burgess) comes out as gay and they find it difficult to accept him. The worried parents yet again "wonder where they've gone wrong" and blame themselves. When Gordon goes on holiday to France, Paul and Annabelle "pray" that the experience will change his sexuality. They incorrectly presume their son is no longer gay after a holiday. Gordon faces homophobia from the house cleaner, Carol Thompson (Geraldine Griffiths), when she assumes she will develop AIDS after cleaning the family toilet. Writers portrayed Paul unexpectedly defending Gordon and informs him that he is a victim of prejudice. Writers portrayed Paul being supportive of his daughter Lucy Collins (Katrin Cartlidge), who begins a relationship with a married man James. Paul tries to intervene and which results in James ending their affair. When Lucy begins dating Barry Grant (Paul Usher) he is less supportive and the parents once again blame themselves.

In another storyline, producers introduced Annabelle's mother Mona Harvey (Margaret Clifton) into the series. Annabelle allows Mona to live at the Collinses while she recovers from an illness. Writers pitted Paul and Mona against one-another, showcasing their difficult relationship. Her dislike of Paul causes problems for Annabelle, as Mona begins to make false accusations against Paul. She accuses him of being a spy and is convinced he has tried to poison her, even disposing of meals Paul had cooked. Another story for Paul was dealing with Annabelle's affair with fellow JP Brian Lawrence (Vincent Maguire). Annabelle goes on a training course in Shrewsbury to escape her mother, Mona's antics. Tibballs assessed that this was the "perfect setting" for their affair, which quickly developed soon after. Paul had tried to contact Annabelle but she was unavailable. He did not suspect an affair and Annabelle decides to pursue Brian and deceive Paul. He becomes suspicious when the pair arrange more secret meetings to have sex. In another episode, Annabelle books a hotel to meet Brian in and Paul finds the booking. Paul assumes it is a gift from Annabelle, which leaves her disappointed. Paul's neighbour, Sheila Grant (Sue Johnston) discovers Annabelle's affair but decides to keep it a secret.

Writers also involved Gordon in the storyline after he catches Annabelle kissing Brian. Like Sheila, Gordon decides to keep his mother's secret. The story comes to a conclusion when Paul finds a ring that Brian gifts to Annabelle. Paul invites Brian over for Christmas, confronts them and they confess to their affair. Tibballs stated that the affair left "Paul a broken man" and "dejected". Gordon decides to avenge his father by sabotaging Brian's car sales business, selling off his cars at low prices. Annabelle realises that Brian is no longer interested in her and after two months she reconciles with Paul. Writers continued to use the affair as a catalyst to friction in their marriage. Paul tries to end their relationship again when he discovers that Sheila knew about Annabelle's affair. They eventually call a truce and decide to do voluntary work together. Wiggins believed the storyline was a good opportunity for himself to showcase his acting. He told TV Guide's Nick Fisher that "the story of the infidelity of my wife and the effect it had on me enabled me to really put something into my character as an actor." Sloane thought it was her character's best story because "suddenly Annabelle came alive". Sloane added that fans informed her that Annabelle mistreated Paul but they understood why she had an affair.

=== Departure ===
On 8 April 1990, Sloane died after she had been diagnosed with cancer. Sloane continued to work despite her diagnosis and at the time of her death, Sloane had filmed up to five weeks of additional episodes as Annabelle. Sloane did not publicise her illness and only told those in production who needed to know. Production and stories were not compromised because of this and an exit storyline could be worked on. Sloane's final episode she filmed was broadcast on 9 May 1990. Their final episode and story together featured Paul and Annabelle's plans to adopt Louise Mitchell (Jenny Hesketh). They wanted to adopt her despite her bad behaviour breaking plates and reminding Paul about Annabelle's affair. After which, producers then decided to write out the remainder of the Collins family. The family's exit story from the series featured Paul deciding to move to the Lake District and his departure was broadcast in June 1990. Wiggins later discussed his time on Brookside and his upset over Sloane's death. He revealed a memorable moment with her had been filming camping scenes in the Collins's garden. The rainy weather caused them to slip on-set and the tent collapsed with Sloane inside. In 1994, it was revealed that Annabelle, Paul and Mona were still living in the Lake District and were running a small guest house.

== Reception ==
James Moore and Clare Goldwin from the Daily Mirror described Paul's best storyline as him being a "former military man constantly at loggerheads with his neighbours." Author Kibble-White stated "the Collins family had reflected an affluence at the start of the decade, albeit affluence on the decline." In his book The Who's Who of Soap Operas, author Anthony Hayward described the character as "the redundant middle management man forced to leave his large house on the Wirral." Matt Wolf from The Sacramento Bee branded Paul and Annabelle "right-wing social climbers" and opined that characters such as these represent the British working class and their problems.

In September 1984, Roy West from the Liverpool Echo critiqued Annabelle and Paul. He wrote "a drearily pretentious pair from the Wirral in early episodes, they seem to have won sympathy lately." Summarising Paul's time in the show, an Inside Soap columnist wrote "Downwardly mobile ex-headmaster. Road-safety campaigns, heart attack, gay son, mother-in-law trouble, Paul did it all." Johann Hari from The Independent branded Paul and Annabelle as "Thatcherites down on their luck". In 1985, the Record Mirror's Eleanor Levy branded Paul and Annabelle the show's "upper middle class slummers". In 1989, Johnny Dee from the publication wrote that Paul and Annabelle are "the snobs of the close who look down on everyone else, but they had problems of their own." He also believed that their inclusion was tokenism. Dee opined that Paul's "memorable moments" were being hit with a trowel by Mona and being arrested at the road safety demonstration.
