= Bullivant =

Bullivant is a surname. Notable people with the surname include:

- Benjamin Bullivant, Attorney General of the Dominion of New England (1686–1687)
- Dargan Bullivant, architect
- Brian Bullivant (1927–2013), British sprint canoeist
- Patricia Bullivant, landscape architect
- Chris Bullivant, British newspaper publisher
- Mike Bullivant, British chemist
- Terry Bullivant (born 1956), English footballer and manager
- Lucy Bullivant, author and curatorial director

== Fictional characters ==
- Sir Walter Bullivant, character in novels by John Buchan
