= Helen West (TV series) =

- Cover of the Region 4 DVD release
- Genre: Crime drama
- Based on: Helen West series by Frances Fyfield
- Written by: T.R. Bowen; Justin Chadwick; Shelagh Stephenson
- Directed by: Jacqueline Holborough; Coky Giedroyc; Myles Connell; Patrick Lau
- Starring: Juliet Stevenson; Amanda Burton; Jim Carter; Conor Mullen; Anton Lesser; Nicholas Woodeson; Emily Joyce; Ian Redford; Martin Freeman; Jessica Oyelowo; Anthony Howell
- Composer: Richard G. Mitchell
- Country of origin: United Kingdom
- Original language: English
- No. of series: 2
- No. of episodes: 4

Production
- Executive producers: Keith Anderson; Patrick McGwire
- Producer: Alan Wright
- Production location: United Kingdom
- Cinematography: Gordon Hickie
- Editors: John MacDonnell; Fergus MacKinnon; Matt Platts-Mills
- Running time: 90 minutes
- Production company: Granada Television

Original release
- Network: ITV
- Release: 15 December 1999 – 20 May 2002

Helen West is a British television crime drama series, based upon the novels of Frances Fyfield, a former crown prosecutor, whom the character is loosely based upon, that first broadcast on 15 December 1999 on ITV. The pilot episode, Trial By Fire, stars Juliet Stevenson as the title character, with Jim Carter co-starring as Chief Superintendent Geoffrey Bailey. The pilot was also released on VHS on 24 January 2000.

In 2001, following the success of the pilot, a series of three episodes was commissioned, titled The Helen West Casebook. The role of Helen West was subsequently re-cast with Amanda Burton taking over the role, and Conor Mullen replacing Jim Carter as Geoffrey Bailey. The series began broadcasting on ITV on 6 May 2002. Despite obtaining a cult following, the series was not renewed for a second run. The series was distributed internationally by Acorn Media, and was released on DVD in the United States on 18 August 2009. The series was later released on DVD in the United Kingdom on 24 May 2010.

Prior to the series, the first novel A Question of Guilt had been adapted for BBC 1 in 1993, with Cherie Lunghi as West and Derrick O'Connor as Bailey.

== Plot ==
The series features on the work of Crown Prosecutor Helen West (played by Juliet Stevenson in Trial By Fire and Amanda Burton in The Helen West Casebook), who tries to achieve balance in a life that consists of an emotionally heavy caseload and a stressful relationship with her supervising police officer, Geoffrey Bailey (played by Jim Carter in Trial By Fire and Conor Mullen in The Helen West Casebook).

West is a very hot-headed and driven woman who tends to pursue justice in each case, even when she is told by her bosses to drop them. As "Deep Sleep" is the third of the Fyfield novels in the series, viewers of The Helen West Casebook are plunged straight into the story without much introduction, with West undergoing and recovering from surgery, and finding solace in the arms of Superintendent Bailey.

== Cast ==
=== Pilot (Trial By Fire) ===
- Juliet Stevenson as Helen West
- Jim Carter as Ch. Supt. Geoffrey Bailey
- Anton Lesser as Brian Redwood
- Emily Joyce as WDC Amanda Scott
- Ian Redford as Sgt. John Bowles

=== Series (The Helen West Casebook) ===
- Amanda Burton as Helen West
- Conor Mullen as Ch. Supt. Geoffrey Bailey
- Nicholas Woodeson as Brian Redwood
- Martin Freeman as DC Don Stone
- Jessica Oyelowo as Rose Darvey
- Anthony Howell as Dinsdale Cotton

== Episodes ==
=== Pilot (1999) ===
No. overall	No. in series	Title	Directed by	Written by	Original release date	Viewers (millions)
1	1	"Trial By Fire"	Patrick Lau	T.R. Bowen	15 December 1999	7.74
When a badly decomposed body is found buried in the woods outside the village of Branston Vale, Ch. Supt Geoffrey Bailey is called to investigate, and suspects the victim may be the housewife of a respected businessman who mysteriously disappeared two weeks ago.

=== Series (2002) ===
No. overall	No. in series	Title	Directed by	Written by	Original release date	Viewers (millions)
2	1	"Deep Sleep"	Jacqueline Holborough	Justin Chadwick	6 May 2002	6.48
When the wife of a respected pharmacist dies in her sleep, it seems like natural causes--except for the amount of chlorofom in her system. Helen's by-the-book boss wants her to move on, and even her boyfriend, Bailey, dismisses her suspicions. But Helen won't let it go and pursues the truth on her own time. When a junkie dies and the dark past of a key witness comes to light, Helen senses impending menace about to explode.
3	2	"Shadow Play"	Coky Giedroyc	Shelagh Stephenson	13 May 2002	5.23
A street sweeper and a lowlife, Lycett makes many court appearances, often charged with lewd acts but acquitted for lack of evidence. Out of court he obsesses about his missing daughter--the only reason, he claims, he's so interested in children. Back in the offices of the Crime Prosecution Service, files keep disappearing, and Helen's clerk, Rose, is sleeping her way through the young police recruits. Helen's romance with Bailey falters when he comes close to exploring other options.
4	3	"A Clear Conscience"	Myles Connell	T.R. Bowen	20 May 2002	5.09
Helen's life is falling apart. Witnesses won't testify, her romance with Bailey is on the rocks, and her apartment desperately needs a spring cleaning. When a friend convinces her to hire help, Helen gets more than she bargained for. The new cleaning lady's husband is Bailey's prime suspect in a murder investigation. Helen finds that justice can be an uphill battle, but Bailey comes through in more ways than one.
