= Rob Spendlove =

British actor (born 1953)

- Born: 1 May 1953 (age 73); London, England, United Kingdom
- Occupation: Actor
- Spouse: Rosie Rowell (m. 1995)
- Children: 3, including Bianca Hendrickse-Spendlove

Rob Spendlove (born 1 May 1953) is a British actor best known for his roles on British television.

He studied drama at Middlesex Polytechnic, worked as a teacher and toured schools with a fringe theatre company.

He has appeared in many television soaps and dramas. He played one of the original characters in Brookside, Roger Huntington, the husband of Heather Huntington played by Amanda Burton.

He played D.I.Hook in the Tales of the Unexpected episode (9/8) "The Finger of Suspicion" (1988). Also in 1988, he played detective Rick Sneaden in Closing Ranks. In 1990, Spendlove played the role of Chris Tierney in the ITV television drama series TECX. His role a joint-owner of a detective agency co-starring with actor Urbano Barberini.

He also appeared in A Touch of Frost, Soldier Soldier (on which he had a major role as Company Sergeant Major and later Lieutenant Michael Stubbs) and most recently in all 17 episodes of The Last Detective as Detective Inspector Aspinall.

Spendlove also has appeared in films like In the Name of the Father (1993) and Backbeat (1994).

In the 1990s, Spendlove was in a relationship with actress Sandy Hendrickse and have one daughter together, Bianca Hendrickse-Spendlove. He then began a relationship with actress Rosie Rowell and they had a daughter named Ruby. They later had a second child named Alfie.

He appeared in 2 episodes of Heartbeat. First in 2002 series 11 episode 18. He played Terry Machin and in 2006, he played Joseph Littlewood series 16 episode 5
