= Spatz =

British children's television series (1990–1992)

- Created by: Andrew Bethell
- Starring: Vas Blackwood; Jennifer Calvert; Stephanie Charles; Jonathan Copestake; Sue Devaney; Joe Greco; Paul Michael; Katy Murphy; Ling Tai
- Countries of origin: United Kingdom (series 1 to 3); Canada (series 1)
- Original language: English
- No. of series: 3
- No. of episodes: 33

Production
- Running time: 25 minutes
- Production company: Thames Television

Original release
- Network: CITV
- Release: 21 February 1990 – 10 April 1992

Spatz is a children's comedy series that ran on Children's ITV during the 1990s, produced by Thames Television and created by Andrew Bethell. The programme originally ran from 21 February 1990 to 10 April 1992. The programme centred on a fast food restaurant situated in a fictional shopping centre in Cricklewood, London. It was operated by two Canadians, Karen Hansson (Jennifer Calvert), Spatz International's self-centered European Co-ordinator, and Thomas "TJ" Strickland (Paul Michael), the restaurant's kind-hearted manager. Vas Blackwood, Stephanie Charles, Jonathan Copestake, Sue Devaney, Joe Greco, Katy Murphy, Ling Tai and Samantha Womack appeared as Spatz restaurant employees. Guest stars included David Harewood, Rhys Ifans, Gary Lineker, Danny John-Jules and Nicholas Parsons.

== History ==
Spatz was devised by Andrew Bethell as a drama for teenagers set in a 1930s themed burger bar, so named because spats might have been worn there. Alan Horrox at Thames Television bought the concept and title and passed them to Grant Cathro and Lee Pressman, already established at Thames Television as the writers of T-Bag and creators of Mike and Angelo, to develop Spatz as a sitcom. While updating the setting to a standard fast food restaurant, the name Spatz was retained, with the writers noting that it suggested spats or disagreements.

Series 1 of Spatz was a co-production between Thames Television and Canada's YTV. From Series 2 onwards, Spatz was produced solely by Thames Television.

== Old Skool Weekend ==
On 6 January 2013, an episode of Spatz from 1992 ("Tango", the third episode of Series 3) was repeated on CITV as part of its 30th anniversary.

== Transmissions ==
Series	Start date	End date	Episodes
1	21 February 1990	16 May 1990	13
2	3 January 1991	4 April 1991	13
3	28 February 1992	10 April 1992	7
