= Bianca Hendrickse-Spendlove =

British actress

- Occupations: Actress; Journalist
- Years active: 2010–
- Television: Hollyoaks
- Father: Rob Spendlove

Bianca Hendrickse-Spendlove is a British actress and journalist. In 2010, she joined the cast of the Channel 4 soap opera Hollyoaks as regular character Texas Longford. She enjoyed being on the soap opera and saw it her as her university experience. In 2013, Hendrickse-Spendlove chose to leave the soap to pursue other acting roles and Texas was killed-off in a whodunit storyline. Hendrickse-Spendlove has since guest-starred in Doctors, Holby City, London Kills and Impact of Murder, and worked as a producer assistant for the 2023 short film Rose.

== Life and career ==
Bianca Hendrickse-Spendlove is the daughter of actors Rob Spendlove and Sandy Hendrickse, and she has two paternal younger half-siblings.

In May 2010, it was announced that Hendrickse-Spendlove had joined the cast of the Channel 4 soap opera Hollyoaks as 20-year-old Texas Longford. Hendrickse-Spendlove was one of nine new cast members aged 17–31 to be announced to join the soap opera, as part of new executive producer Paul Marquess's shake-up of the soap. The actress joked that working with "hot cast members" was an "added bonus" and made it "quite fun coming into work". Texas introduced as the older sister of established character India Longford (Beth Kingston), who is initially not happy to see her. She was characterised as being a "force of nature", always looking "fantastic" despite not caring how she appears, and having a "almost super-natural ability to make other people feel good about themselves" despite being fragile and vulnerable herself. Hendrickse-Spendlove made her first appearance as Texas on 17 May 2010. The actress explained that she was "plucked out" of university when she got the role. Texas' storylines on the soap have included falling in love with Dodger Savage (Danny Mac), developing romantic feelings for Jodie Wilde (Montana Manning), being kidnapped and targeted by serial killer Silas Blissett (Jeff Rawle) after he kills India, and being guilt-tripped into marrying Dodger's brother Will Savage (James Atherton).

"To be honest, I could have stayed at Hollyoaks and just been so happy there, because everybody is so great and it's a fantastic job. But at the same time, I knew that I wanted to go off and do other things, so it did feel like my time to move on. I've done three years on the show and was plucked out of university when I got the job. I actually look at this as my 'university experience', because I really have learned so much first hand from everyone who's here - but with the extra benefit of being paid!"

–Hendrickse-Spendlove on her decision to leave Hollyoaks (2013)

In February 2013, it was announced that Hendrickse-Spendlove had chosen to leave Hollyoaks and that Texas would be killed-off in a whodunit storyline, which would involve Texas being pushed out of a window and fall to her death on her wedding day to Will, sparking a new murder mystery storyline. Hendrickse-Spendlove revealed that leaving Hollyoaks was a hard decision and felt sad as she would miss her colleagues. She hoped that she would be able to do some theatre work whilst also continuing in television, explaining, "I'm hoping to try everything I can, see what's out there and explore the world!" She added, "I've had an amazing three years on the show. I've learned a lot and it's been a fantastic experience. I'm also excited, but it's definitely going to feel weird not going onto the set every morning and seeing the same familiar faces!" The actress was grateful that Texas would get a big exit storyline and revealed that she received messages from fans on Twitter asking her not to leave the soap, which she found "really sweet and touching".

The wedding scenes and stunt were filmed at Peckforton Castle and the actress chose to do most of her stunts involving Texas falling to the ground, although a stunt double was used when Texas goes through the window. She added, "What was also nice was that the director and the First AD who I came into the show with were both working on my exit week. They worked on my first ever block, when I was on location in Croxteth Hall doing the haunted house week. They brought me into the show and they brought me out again!" Ahead of Texas' exit, a special trailer promoting the episodes was released, as well as the reveal of five characters who would be suspects for her murder. The actress' final episode as Texas aired on 13 May 2013, when it was revealed that Will was the one who pushed Texas out of the window.

In 2014, Hendrickse-Spendlove portrayed Cassie McLennan, a student selling an illegal tan product, in rival soap opera Doctors in the episode broadcast on 7 April of that year. The following year, she portrayed Chloe Whithers in an episode of the 17th series of Holby City. In 2017, Hendrickse-Spendlove interviewed actress Kim Cattrall for The Carousel. In 2019, Hendrickse-Spendlove appeared in the first episode of the police procedural television series London Kills, directed by Marquess. That same year, she appeared in an episode of Impact of Murder. She guest-starred on Doctors again as pregnant Chloe Taylor-Smith in the episode originally airing on 16 April 2020. In 2019, Hendrickse-Spendlove was also a producer assistant and set dresser for the short film Rose, which premiered at the 2023 Cheltenham International Film Festival.

== Filmography ==
Year	Title	Role	Notes	Ref.
2010–13	Hollyoaks	Texas Longford	Regular role	
2014	Doctors	Cassie McLennan	Guest role (1 episode)	
2015	Holby City	Chloe Whithers	Guest role (1 episode, series 17)	
2019	London Kills	Olivia Jarvis	Guest role (1 episode)	
2019	Impact of Murder	Kayleigh	Guest role (1 episode)	
2020	Doctors	Chloe Taylor-Smith	Guest role (1 episode)	
