= TECX =

British television action drama series

- Also known as: Tecx
- Genre: Crime drama Action
- Created by: Ian Kennedy Martin
- Written by: Various
- Directed by: Antonia Bird; Renny Rye; Gabrielle Beaumont; Lawrence Gordon Clark; Alan Cooke
- Starring: Rob Spendlove; Urbano Barberini; Ulrike Schwarz; Stéphane Audran; Jenny Agutter
- Composer: Hal Lindes
- Country of origin: United Kingdom
- Original language: English
- No. of series: 2
- No. of episodes: 13

Production
- Executive producer: Ted Childs
- Producer: Simon Channing Williams
- Cinematography: Michael J. Davis
- Editor: Ollie Huddleston
- Running time: 50 minutes
- Production company: Central Independent Television

Original release
- Network: ITV
- Release: 22 March – 15 August 1990

TECX is a British television crime drama/action series created by Ian Kennedy Martin, that aired on ITV for two series and thirteen episodes between 22 March and 15 August 1990. The series revolved around a Brussels-based private detective agency called TECX (a play on "tecs," short for detectives).

== Plot ==
Tecx dealt with the cases of a group of international detectives who were based in Brussels but roamed all over Europe. Their headquarters was Souverain Associates. Kate Milverton (Jenny Agutter) was in charge and much of the action centred around Chris Tierney (Rob Spendlove)

Many guest stars made appearances, including John Stride, Stéphane Audran, John Castle, Geoffrey Bayldon, Keith Barron, Abigail Cruttenden and a young Mark Strong.

== Cast ==
- Rob Spendlove as Chris Tierney
- Urbano Barberini as Fabio Cavalcanti
- Ulrike Schwarz as Anna Holz
- Stéphane Audran as Isabelle Souverain
- Jenny Agutter as Kate Milverton

== Episodes ==
=== Series overview ===
Series	Episodes	Originally released	
Series	Episodes	First released	Last released
1	7	22 March 1990	3 May 1990
2	6	11 July 1990	15 August 1990

=== Series 1 (1990) ===
No.	Title	Directed by	Written by	Original release date
1	Deep Water	Alan Cooke	Robert Smith	22 March 1990
Chris and Fabio, two would-be detectives are given their first big case by an influential Parisian lawyer. Hired to protect a disgruntled former employee of a shipping company who is being threatened, Chris and Fabio are joined in their investigation by Anna. They find themselves in a world of lies, frauds and disappearing ships.
2	The Wine Business	Antonia Bird	Patrick Harbinson	29 March 1990
TECX overstep the mark. Asked by Kate Milverton, an English lawyer in Isabelle's practice, for some minor background information on a client's case, they dig up more than requested. There's resentment all around especially as Kate seems to be developing more than a business partnership with her wine merchant client, Hugo.
3	The Sea Takes All	Antonia Bird	Michael Baker	5 April 1990
An unknown client hires the TECX agency to investigate a suspicious toxic waste transporter. Fabio is drawn to a "Green" activist who provides him with information but then disaster strikes.
4	A Question of Chemistry	Renny Rye	Jane Hollowood	12 April 1990
The TECX agency investigate unfair competition among NATO equipment suppliers. The trail takes them to Germany where Anna's past returns to haunt her.
5	Dead End	Renny Rye	Pete Barwood	19 April 1990
The detectives of the TECX agency are hired by a powerful Japanese conglomerate to find a "missing person" with whom they have unfinished business. However TECX are not the only ones looking for him.
6	17k	Lawrence Gordon Clark	Robert Hammond	26 April 1990
TECX investigates the brutal murder of a Chinese shopkeeper in Amsterdam. Isabelle defends the dead man's daughter against a charge of attempted homicide in Brussels. The case drags up disturbing memories from Anna's past.
7	Rock a Buy Baby	Gabrielle Beaumont	Barbara Machin	3 May 1990
A small town politician receives blackmail notes concerning the adoption of his son - someone has discovered how he and his wife secretly bought a baby. With an election approaching, the politician turns to the TECX agency for help.

=== Series 2 (1990) ===
No. overall	No. in series	Title	Directed by	Written by	Original release date
8	1	Needle in a Haystack	Gabrielle Beaumont	Timothy Prager	11 July 1990
A multi-national food company is being blackmailed - someone is trying to poison its fruit. TECX agents are sent to Marseilles to try and catch the culprit.
9	2	Previous Convictions	Alan Cooke	Guy Meredith	18 July 1990
A ghost from Fabio's past causes problems when she turns to him for help.
10	3	Getting Personal	Antonia Bird	Jack Chaney	25 July 1990
Anna and Fabio investigate a series of damaging leaks from the nuclear waste committee.
11	4	Fall from Grace	Lawrence Gordon Clark	Robert Smith	1 August 1990
A high flying Euro MP asks the TECX agency for help when a beautiful young translator starts sending him stolen documents which threaten to compromise his career. Soon it's a murder investigation.
12	5	Writing on the Wall	Antonia Bird	Andy de la Tour	8 August 1990
The TECX agency are in London trying to have a holiday when a distraught "new-age hippy" asks them to find his stolen van, which is full of chunks of the Berlin Wall.
13	6	A Soldier's Death	Renny Rye	Susan Wilkins	15 August 1990
The TECX team are about to fly home when they learn that Kate's father is ill. His family bank is blackmailed and large sums of money are disappearing. Kate urges him to employ TECX.

== Home media ==
Notably, the series has neither been repeated since broadcast, nor is available on any form of home media.
