= Frances Fyfield =

Pseudonym of Frances Hegarty, an English lawyer and crime-writer

Frances Hegarty
- Born: 18 November 1948 (age 77); Derbyshire, England
- Occupations: Lawyer and writer
- Writing career
- Pen name: Frances Fyfield
- Genre: Crime fiction

Frances Hegarty (born 18 November 1948), known by her pen name Frances Fyfield, is an English writer and lawyer.

== Biography ==
Born and brought up in Derbyshire, Hegarty was mostly educated in convent schools before reading English at Newcastle University. After graduating, she took a course in criminal law. She worked initially for the Metropolitan Police and later the Crown Prosecution Service. She claims "After a long diet of criminal law, including dangerous dogs, rape, mayhem and much, much murder, the indigestion of pity and fury provoked me to write. I wanted to write romance, but the domestically macabre always got in the way."

She has won several awards, including the Crime Writers' Association Duncan Lawrie Dagger for Blood From Stone in 2008 and the Silver Dagger for Deep Sleep. In addition, her novel, Safer than Houses was nominated for the Duncan Lawrie Dagger in 2006. She also writes psychological thrillers under the name of Frances Hegarty, among them, The Playroom, Half Light and Let's Dance, which was published in 1995.

Her novels have been translated into 14 languages. Several have been adapted for television. Fyfield's Helen West series has twice been adapted for television. Juliet Stevenson played Helen West in Trial by Fire (1999) and Amanda Burton later took on the role in the 2002 series The Helen West Casebook.

Fyfield hosted the BBC Radio 4 programme Tales from the Stave until 2018. The programme looked at important music works using original scores and libretto.

== Bibliography ==
Helen West novels

- A Question of Guilt (1988) ISBN 9780754079491 – nominated for an Edgar Award
- Trial by Fire (1990) ISBN 9780434274277 [US Title: Not That Kind of Place] – Rumpole Award
- Deep Sleep (1991) ISBN 9780434274260 – Silver Dagger Award
- Shadow Play (1993) ISBN 9780593028667 - Grand Prix de Littérature Policière
- A Clear Conscience (1994) ISBN 9780593037430
- Without Consent (1996) ISBN 9780593040782

Sarah Fortune novels

- Shadows on the Mirror (1989) ISBN 9780754020028
- Perfectly Pure and Good (1994) ISBN 9780593035313
- Staring at the Light (1999) ISBN 9780593043844
- Looking Down (2004) ISBN 9780316861779
- Safer Than Houses (2005) ISBN 9780316727648
- Cold to the Touch (2009, Sphere) ISBN 9781847441096

Diana Porteous novels

- Gold Digger (2012) ISBN 9780751549669
- Casting the First Stone (2013) ISBN 9780751549706
- Painted Smile (2015) ISBN 9780751555219
- Welcome The Stranger (2017) ISBN 9780751555158

Other novels

- Blind Date (1998) ISBN 9780593041024
- Undercurrents (2000) ISBN 9780316853873
- The Nature of the Beast (2001) ISBN 9780316857468
- Seeking Sanctuary (2003) ISBN 9780316859844
- The Art of Drowning (2006) ISBN 9780062300935
- Blood From Stone (2008, Sphere) ISBN 9781847440747 – Duncan Lawrie Dagger Award

Novels as Frances Hegarty

- The Playroom (1991) ISBN 9780140145441
- Half Light (1992) ISBN 9780140168525
- Let's Dance (1995) ISBN 9780670866397

== Filmography ==
- Helen West (2002; television series)
- The Blind Date (2000)
- Trial by Fire (1999; TV)
