= Ling Tai =

Chinese actress (born 1961)

- Born: Lee Ling Tai; 23 June 1961 (age 64); Huangshi, China
- Occupations: Actress, Presenter, shop assistant
- Spouse: Robert J. Fox (m. 1988, separated) (1 child)

Ling Tai (born 23 June 1961) is a Chinese actress, remembered for being a presenter on the final year of children's programme Crackerjack! as well as playing Lily in the first series of children's comedy Spatz.

== Early life ==
Her name meaning Beautiful Goddess, she was found abandoned as a baby on the streets of Hong Kong. Rescued by a policeman, the infant was taken to an orphanage. Aged 18 months, the toddler was brought to Britain as one of nine baby orphan girls for adoption, being taken in by a couple from Eastcote: Leslie Emmerson (a B.E.A. Comet pilot) and his wife Edna ("Teddy"). Growing up in Ruislip, the girl went by her adopted name Keri/Kerry Emmerson. Aged 18, Ling planned to return home to China with her adoptive parents but decided to enter the world of acting, reverting back to her original name.

== Career ==
Acting work includes appearances in The Two Ronnies, Bergerac, Dramarama, Never the Twain, The Little and Large Show, Alas Smith and Jones, Coronation Street and Soldier Soldier. Doctor Who fans recall Ling for her part as Shou Yuing in the 1989 story Battlefield (after previously being an uncredited extra in The Leisure Hive and Warriors of the Deep).

Keeping her adoptive name Kerry for retail business, she also worked as a shop assistant in the Tops and Bottoms clothing shops in Pinner and Eastcote for a few years in between acting engagements.

On stage, the actress has appeared as the Princess in two pantomime productions of Aladdin: firstly in 1984 at the Darlington Civic Theatre (starring Iris Williams) and then in 1985 at the Theatre Royal, Brighton (starring Christopher Biggins). Other work includes South Pacific at Connaught Theatre, Worthing in 1983 and in Alex Finlayson's Winding the Bell at the Royal Exchange, Manchester in 1989, as well as various Crackerjack productions.
