= Annabelle Collins (Brookside) =

Fictional character from the Channel 4 soap opera Brookside

- Brookside character
- Portrayed by: Doreen Sloane
- Duration: 1982–1990
- First appearance: 2 November 1982
- Last appearance: 9 May 1990
- Created by: Phil Redmond
In-universe information
- Occupation: French teacher Election campaign assistant Caterer; Magistrate
- Father: Jack Harvey
- Mother: Mona Fallon
- Stepfather: Gerald Fallon
- Brothers: Teddy Harvey
- Husband: Paul Collins
- Sons: Gordon Collins
- Daughters: Lucy Collins
- Grandmothers: Annabelle

Annabelle Collins is a fictional character from the British Channel 4 soap opera Brookside, played by Doreen Sloane. One of the show's original characters, Annabelle debuted during the episode broadcast on 2 November 1982. Annabelle is characterised as an intelligent woman who is used to a luxurious lifestyle. She is married to Paul Collins (Jim Wiggins) and they move into Brookside Close during the show's first episode. The move is a downsize from a big house after Paul loses a lucrative management role. Annabelle struggles to adjust to her new lifestyle but eventually becomes active in her new community. She is portrayed as generous and neighbourly, but also displays characteristics of snobbery. Writers created a difficult marriage for Annabelle and Paul.

Annabelle stories were often centric to the problems of her children, Gordon Collins (Nigel Crowley) and Lucy Collins (Katrin Cartlidge). Annabelle struggles to accept her son's homosexuality and her daughter's wayward behaviour. Producers created an affair storyline between Annabelle and Brian Lawrence (Vincent Maguire), which nearly ruined her marriage. Sloane liked the story because she believed it made Annabelle "come alive" and "become human". Other stories include training to be a magistrate and her problematic relationship with her mother, Mona Harvey (Margaret Clifton). Sloane died on 8 April 1990 after being diagnosed with cancer. She had continued to film new scenes regardless of her illness. The character made her final appearance on 9 May 1990. The Collinses departure storyline featured them moving to the Lake District to live with Mona.

== Development ==
=== Characterisation ===
The character appears in the first ever episode of Brookside. Annabelle is characterised as an "intelligent woman" who had been used to a busy life before moving into Brookside Close. In the character's backstory, Annabelle was born in Birkenhead. Annabelle is portrayed as the matriarch of the Collins family consisting of herself, husband Paul Collins (Jim Wiggins) and their two children Gordon Collins (Nigel Crowley) and Lucy Collins (Katrin Cartlidge). They were introduced into the series an as upper class family who are forced to move into Brookside Close, after Paul is made redundant from a lucrative management role at the firm Petrochem. They are a nuclear family who strive for trouble-free existence. The move forced the Collinses to give up their large home and down-size. Paul is forced to take benefits and Lucy is removed from private schooling to support their new financial situation. Annabelle is a former French teacher but the move to Brookside Close sees her take on new ventures. Unable to cope with their new lives, she and Paul spiral into a depression and Annabelle starts a local ratepayers association. This puts her at odds with her neighbours, who are unable to understand her passion for the association. Writers also portrayed Annabelle at odds with Sheila Grant (Sue Johnston) when she refuses to support Sheila's women's action group during a union strike. Overtime the character adjusts to her new life and overcomes her snobbery. She also becomes accepted in the community and becomes a more neighbourly character.

In a character profile published in TVTimes, Annabelle was described as being fifteen years younger than Paul. "she has always enjoyed a high standard of living and doesn't adapt easily to the change. The biggest blow is that her husband's redundancy led to the sale of a spacious house before their move to Brookside." In the book Phil Redmond's Brookside - Life in the Close, author Geoff Tibballs wrote that Annabelle was completely different to Paul. He described her as "much more amenable" than her husband and she often have to appease her neighbours. He compared her to a horse keeper as she is constantly clearing up issues Paul causes with other Brookside Close characters. Annabelle likes being involved with the community, even though her support for the Conservative Party prevented her from participating in strikes. Tibballs added that Annabelle and Paul did not have the perfect marriage but were content with each other. Annabelle's fashion and style gained her popularity with older female viewers. Show creator Phil Redmond revealed that the Brookside press office received many letters complimenting her on "nice" fashion.

=== Marriage and family issues ===
Writers devised a problematic marriage for Annabelle and Paul which made more significant in 1984. The story begins when Annabelle is hired as an election agent by her old friend Robin Tate (Richard Tate). Paul disapproves of their involvement because he suspects they are having an affair. Robin's wife Dorothy Tate (Mary Cunningham) also shares her concerns. Robin's election campaign is unsuccessful which Paul and Dorothy find amusing. This causes Annabelle and Robin to consider an affair but they are too apprehensive about being unfaithful to their partners.

The Collinses struggled with the behaviour of their children and this played into various of Annabelle's screen time. When Lucy is arrested for creating a disturbance at a strike, Annabelle is mortified. Tibballs stated that "Annabelle cannot come to terms with the fact her daughter has been in trouble with the police." Annabelle decides that the only option is to send Lucy to live in France with the Dubois family. Another story given to the Collins family was the revelation that their son, Gordon is gay. Annabelle and Paul are shocked when a woman informs them that Gordon and her son have been having an affair. They are confused because they believed he was happy with his girlfriend Cathy Walker (Katy Newell) and blame themselves. Annabelle decides to send Gordon to stay with his sister in France. She and Paul believe that time away will could encourage him to change his sexuality. Writers gradually made the couple happier in their marriage and made them centric to their children's stories. Annabelle grows bored of Paul's constant reminiscing of industrial warfare and decides to start an at-home catering business. She employs Carol Thompson (Geraldine Griffiths) to help her business and clean their home. Paul is initially reluctant but accepts Carol into their home. When Lucy was reintroduced into the series played by Maggie Saunders, she becomes wayward and promiscuous. She then begins having sex with villainous Barry Grant (Paul Usher) which causes Annabelle and Paul to believe they have failed as parents. When Gordon returns from France, Carol discovers he is gay and refuses to clean for fear of contracting AIDS. Paul defends his son and Carol leaves. They then deal with their son's sexuality as he begins a romance with Christopher Duncan (Stifyn Parri). However, Gordon's persona was developed to become more troublesome. He and Christopher steal a car to escape a gang of men and accidentally run over and kill Paul’s rescue dog, Lucky.

In another storyline, producers introduced Annabelle's mother Mona Harvey (Margaret Clifton) into the series. When Mona becomes ill, Annabelle goes to visit her and decides that Mona must live with her while she recovered. Mona has a difficult relationship with Paul and dislikes him. Her antics cause problems for Annabelle as she begins to make false accusations against Paul. She first accuses him of being a spy, accuses him of trying to poison her and disposes of any food Paul had cooked. Mona also displays her favouritism of Annabelle's brother, Teddy Harvey (Graham Weston). Mona fails to grasp that Gordon is gay and is happy to assume that "Chris" is female. Christopher responds by renting out Mona's home to make money, but his scam is discovered by Annabelle and Paul. Mona writes a letter to Teddy complaining about Paul but on her way to the post box she falls down a sinkhole. She survives and is taken to hospital.

After five months of having Mona live with them, Annabelle decides to put her mother in a home. Mona escapes from the home twice and claims that she is being abused by the care home staff. Annabelle does not believe her and sends her back. Gordon and Christopher then make an unannounced visit to the care home and finds evidence that Mona is being abused. Writers continued to make Mona's presence unbearable for Annabelle and Paul. After which, Mona and Gordon strike up a close bond and Annabelle is irritated by Mona being way more accepting of his sexuality. She also decides to sell her house and give the proceeds to Gordon and Christopher on the condition she lives with them. Tibballs assessed that Annabelle "had become so irritated by all the sniping" that she decided to get away. Eventually, Annabelle sends Mona to live in another care home.

=== Magistrate career and affair ===
Producers decided to make the character more ambitious and take on a new career. Annabelle thinks she would be a successful magistrates judge and begins training for the role. Annabelle worries that she will not be accepted as a magistrate because of Paul's involvement with a road safety pressure group. Her concerns were not unfounded because Paul is then arrested for creating a road blockade. Despite this, she successfully passes and takes on the responsibility. Writers used her new career to showcase Annabelle's aloofness, despite them previously making her more neighbourly and grounded.

In 1988, writers decided to create an affair storyline between Annabelle and her colleague Brian Lawrence (Vincent Maguire). Their affair begins when Annabelle goes on a training course in Shrewsbury to escape Mona's antics. Tibballs assessed that this was the "perfect setting for a spot of extra-marital nookie" and that they carried on like "sex-starved rabbits". Paul had tried to contact Annabelle but she was unavailable. He did not suspect an affair and Annabelle decides to pursue her new romance. The pair arrange secret meetings to have sex and Paul becomes suspicious. Annabelle books a hotel to meet Brian in and Paul finds the booking. Paul assumes it is a gift from Annabelle, which leaves her disappointed. She decides to invite Brian over instead but Sheila witnesses them kissing. Annabelle defends her actions but Sheila does not want to get involved.

Writers continued the affair story, now involving Gordon. He takes a job at Brian's car salesroom but other staff know about the affair. They tease Gordon about it and he catches Annabelle and Brian kissing. He confronts Brian who tells him that he will not end the affair. Gordon does not confront his mother and Brian lies to Annabelle about Gordon's knowledge. He then buys Annabelle a ring, which Paul discovers and realises the truth. He invites Brian over for Christmas, confronts them and they confess to their affair. Tibballs stated that the affair left "Paul a broken man" and "dejected". Gordon decides to get revenge on Brian by sabotaging his business and selling off his cars at cheap prices. Annabelle realises that Brian is no longer interested in her and after two months she reconciles with Paul. Writers continued to use the affair as a catalyst to friction in their marriage. Paul tries to end their relationship again when he discovers that Sheila knew about Annabelle's affair. They eventually call a truce and decide to do voluntary work together.

Sloane enjoyed portraying Annabelle's affair and believed it was good her character. She told Nick Fisher from TV Guide that "from my point of view the best bit was the affair. Suddenly Annabelle came alive. She became a human being and was allowed to fall off her pedestal. It was lovely. And when fans stopped me in the street, they'd say 'you didn't treat that husband of yours very well - but I don't blame you.'" When the story was broadcast, Sloane began to receive wolf whistles from men as she walked down the street. She added "at my age it was very flattering." Wiggins also believed the story benefitted Paul and concluded "the effect it had on me enabled me to really put something into my character."

=== Departure ===
On 8 April 1990, Sloane died following being diagnosed with cancer. Sloane continued to work despite her diagnosis and had been responded well to her cancer treatment. At the time of her death, Sloane had filmed up to five weeks of additional episodes as Annabelle. Sloane did not publicise her illness and only told those in production who needed to know. Production and stories were not compromised because of this and an exit storyline could be worked on. Sue Johnstone and Brookside creator Redmond also paid tribute to Sloane, with the latter stating "we are all going to miss the support, enthusiasm and professionalism Doreen gave us from the very first day of Brookside." Sloane's final episode she filmed aired on 9 May 1990. The episode featured the continuation of Annabelle's plans to adopt Louise Mitchell (Jenny Hesketh), despite her misbehaviour bringing up Annabelle's affair and breaking plates.

Following Sloane's death, producers decided to write the entire Collins family out of the series. The Collinses departure storyline featured them moving to the Lake District. Mona had married her friend Gerald Fallon (Bryan Matheson) and already moved to the Lake District one year previously. Wiggins later discussed his time on Brookside, stating that it upset him to talk about Sloane. He added that a memorable moment was filming camping scenes with Sloane in the Collinses garden. The rainy weather caused them to slip on-set and the tent collapsed with Sloane inside. In 1994, it was revealed that Annabelle, Paul and Mona were still living in the Lake District and were running a small guest house. Gerald had died in two years previously after having a heart-attack.

== Reception ==
A reporter from Inside Soap stated that "Doreen made an impact on viewers as snooty Annabelle who was never short of advice for her family and neighbours and found her true vocation as a magistrate." Another Inside Soap reporter described her as a "well-to-do Hyacinth Bucket type who endured countless problems with her children. Shed her prissy image to have an affair with fellow magistrate Brian Lawrence." In September 1984, Roy West from the Liverpool Echo critiqued Annabelle and Paul. He wrote "a drearily pretentious pair from the Wirral in early episodes, they seem to have won sympathy lately and Doreen Sloane who plays Annabelle, is even flowering as some kind of middle-aged fashion queen." In 1985, Eleanor Levy from the Record Mirror branded Annabelle and Paul the "upper middle class slummers" and that the character has "expensive problems with her thyroid". In 1989, Johnny Dee from the publication said that Annabelle and Paul are "the snobs of the close who look down on everyone else, but they had problems of their own." He also believed that their inclusion was tokenism. Dee disliked Annabelle's affair with Brian because it was "completely out of character" but called it a "memorable moment".

James Moore and Clare Goldwin from the Daily Mirror described Annabelle's best storyline as being her affair with Brian. Author Graham Kibble-White stated that "the Collins family had reflected an affluence at the start of the decade, albeit affluence on the decline." Matt Wolf from The Sacramento Bee branded Annabelle and Paul the show's "right-wing social climbers" and opined that characters such as these represent the British working class and their problems. Johann Hari from The Independent branded the couple "Thatcherites down on their luck". Geoffrey Phillips of the Evening Standard opined that Annabelle behaved "recklessly" during her affair. Jim Shelley from The Guardian branded Annabelle "the regal snob and blueblooded moralist". He opined that when writers "reduced" Annabelle to having an affair, it was a sign that the show had gone "awry".

In the book, To Be Continued... Soap Operas Around the World, Christine Geraghty wrote that Annabelle was an example of one of Brookside's early authentic female characters. Geraghty claimed that Annabelle was a "strong mother [...] who controlled and negotiated family life within the home." She assessed that the show lacked such female roles during the 1990s.
