= Mark Burgess (playwright) =

British playwright and actor (born 1959)

Mark Burgess (born 9 April 1959) is a British playwright and actor who appeared in Brookside as Gordon Collins. Burgess wrote and performed the one-man show The Man with the Golden Pen on the life of Ian Fleming.

== Selected works ==
- Casting Shadows, centred on a discussion between Max Miller, Laurence Olivier and Terence Rattigan in 1962 (1999)
- The Man with the Golden Pen (original title: Fleming's Bond), one-man play about Ian Fleming (2000)
- Einstein in Cromer, with David Suchet in the title role about Albert Einstein's stay in a small hut on Roughton Heath (2004)
- From Father with Love, on Ian Fleming's relationship with his son Caspar (2006)
- Sam O'Bedlam, centred on Samuel Beckett, played by Jim Norton (2006)
- The Wrong Hero, on the wartime life and death of Leslie Howard (2008)
- A King's Speech, on Lionel Logue and George VI (2009)
- Tales from Tate Modern, (A Modern Love Story) BBC Radio 4 Short Story (2010)
- Two Halves Of Guinness Stage Play (2011)
- Eel Pie Island short story BBC radio 4 (2012)
- The Only Way, a one-act play to commemorate Bedford Modern School's 10 years of co-education, starring Chris Edge and Elsa Keep (2013)
- With Wings as Eagles, a play celebrating 250 years of Bedford Modern School, starring Gregor Copeland
