= Chris Bullivant =

British newspaper publisher

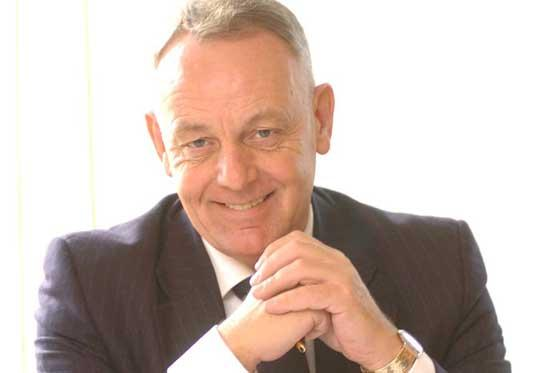
Chris Bullivant Sr., 2011

Chris Bullivant Sr is a British newspaper publisher who with his wife Pat launched the UK's first free daily title, the Daily News, in October 1984.

Having set up in excess of 74 newspapers, the Bullivants have now closed all of their business, and Bullivant Media, which in 2011 was the 15th-largest newspaper publisher in the country has been dissolved. They no longer continue to publish weekly newspapers across Warwickshire, Worcestershire and parts of the West Midlands in the southern conurbations around Birmingham and they no longer publish various award winning magazines including Your Wedding, InsideOut, Flavour and Exclusive Homes. Previously, he also released a pair of popular broadsheet Gazettes.

In 2010 Bullivant launched a part paid-for weekly newspaper in Birmingham. Called the Birmingham Press, and accompanied by a free edition, The Birmingham Free Press, it was intended to rival Trinity Mirror's Birmingham Post, but after only a few months the paper went into liquidation with total debts of £347,796. Bullivant blamed the newspaper's collapse on a lack of support from estate agents advertising in the city. Bullivant Media Limited (company number 06850612) was liquidated in September 2022 due to insolvency with creditor’s claims totalling just under 2 million pounds sterling. Bullivant Media Limited (company number 06850612) was dissolved on 14 May 2025.
