= Birmingham Daily News =

The Birmingham Daily News, Europe's first free daily newspaper, was launched in Birmingham, England in October 1984.

The paper was created by local entrepreneurs Chris Bullivant and his wife Pat, and was edited by David Scott. It was published from offices at Five Ways and delivered free to 276,000 houses around the Birmingham and Solihull areas. Reed Regional Newspapers, part of the media giant Reed Elsevier, bought a 51 per cent stake in the paper in 1987.

Although it operated profitably for many years the Daily News suffered from the decline in advertising revenue during the early nineties recession. Production was reduced to weekly in June 1991 with the newspaper retitled Birmingham Metronews. This in turn was relaunched as a daily publication in 2000 as the Midland edition of the Metro group, distributed free of charge to commuters travelling by public transport.
