= Jim Wiggins (actor) =

English actor (1922–1999)

- Born: James Wiggins; 13 March 1922; Birkenhead, England
- Died: 1999 (aged 76–77); Devon, England
- Occupation: Actor
- Years active: 1942-1997
- Spouse(s): Patricia Wiggins, Joan Wiggins
- Children: Peter Wiggins, Claire Wiggins, Kerry Wiggins

James Wiggins (13 March 1922 – 1999) was an English actor. He is known for his role as Paul Collins in the British soap opera, Brookside.

Wiggins was born in Birkenhead. An amateur actor for many years, he finally turned professional in 1978, having had careers in the Army, civil service as a teacher and later a Deputy Headmaster. As well as his role in Brookside (from 1982 to 1990), he appeared in a number of other television series. These include Till Death Us Do Part,The Gentle Touch, The Bill, Agatha Christie's Partners in Crime, Emmerdale Farm and The Professionals.

Wiggins served in the RAF during World War II. He left the RAF following the end of the war and became interested in amateur acting, playing roles at Unity Theatre, Liverpool. He secured worked as a clerk in Liverpool's Leece Street and continued to pursue acting work. Wiggins died in Devon in 1999, following a short illness. His death was publicised on 8 September 1999.
