= Jennifer Calvert =

Canadian actress

- Born: 7 December 1963 (age 62); Ontario, Canada
- Occupations: Stage, television actress

Jennifer Calvert (born 7 December 1963 in Ontario) is a Canadian actress with many years' experience on stage and primarily UK television. She trained at RADA and is most famous for her role in children's comedy drama Spatz in the 1990s. She has guest-starred in other shows such as Mike and Angelo, Stargate SG-1 (3 episodes), The Fast Show, Red Dwarf and Holby City. She appeared in adverts for Energizer batteries and the feature film Proteus. In the late 1980s she also played the part of Cheryl Boyanowsky in long-running soap opera Brookside.
