= Doreen Sloane =

British actress (1934–1990)

Doreen Sloane (24 February 1934, in Birkenhead – 8 April 1990, in Liverpool) was an English actress, best known for playing Annabelle Collins, one of the original characters in the soap opera Brookside on Channel 4 between 1982 and 1990.

She trained at the Elliott Clarke Theatre School in Liverpool and appeared in repertory theatres before being cast in the first of four roles in Coronation Street.

Sloane also appeared in the films Yanks and Chariots of Fire. Other television appearances include Last of the Summer Wine, How We Used to Live, Emmerdale Farm and Coronation Street.

She died of cancer at the age of 56. The final scenes she recorded for Brookside went to air after her death.

== Credits ==
Year	Title	Role	Notes
1971	Coronation Street	Miss Wilford	2 episodes
1972–1973	Coronation Street	Hilary Dodds	3 episodes
1973	Shabby Tiger	Woman at exhibition	
1973	Crown Court	Jury Forewoman	3 episodes
1974	ITV Playhouse	Shop assistant	
1974	Crown Court	Molly McDowell	3 episodes
1974	Emmerdale Farm	Louise Jarman	
1975	Nightingale's Boys	Audrey Crowther	
1975	Coronation Street	Nurse Sankey	2 episodes
1975	Last of the Summer Wine	Bus conductress	
1976	Victorian Scandals	Clara Nottidge	
1979	Crown Court	Court reporter	3 episodes
1980	Emmerdale Farm	Margaret Hatfield	6 episodes
1981–1982	How We Used to Live	Audrey Maitland	7 episodes
1982	All For Love	Miss Skinner	
1982–1990	Brookside	Annabelle Collins	394 episodes
