= Amanda Burton =

Northern Irish actress (born 1956)

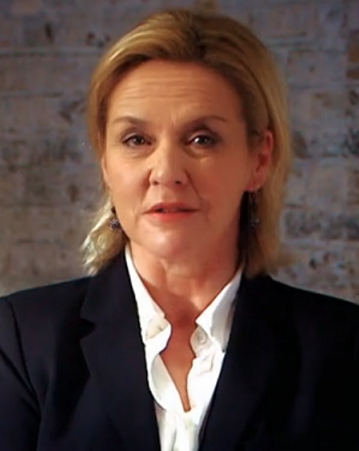
- Burton in 2014
- Born: Derry, Northern Ireland
- Occupation: Actress
- Years active: 1981–present
- Spouses: Jonathan Hartley (m. 1976; div. 1982); Sven Arnstein (m. 1989; div. 2004)
- Children: 2
- Awards: National Television Award; TV Quick Award

Amanda Burton is a Northern Irish actress. Her notable credits include Heather Haversham in the Channel 4 soap opera Brookside (1982–1986), Beth Glover in the ITV drama series Peak Practice (1993–1995), Sam Ryan in the BBC crime drama series Silent Witness (1996–2004, 2022), Clare Blake in the ITV crime drama series The Commander (2003–2008), Karen Fisher in the BBC school-based drama series Waterloo Road (2010–2011) and Katherine Maguire in the ITV detective series Marcella (2020).

== Early life and education ==
Burton was born in Derry, Northern Ireland, the youngest of four sisters. Her father, Arthur Burton, was a primary school headmaster at Ballougry Primary School, which she attended as a child. She was raised at Ballougry, a rural townland on the south-western outskirts of Derry City, where her family lived in a house beside Ballougry Primary School, right beside County Londonderry's boundary with County Donegal. After later attending Londonderry High School, she moved to England at the age of 18, where she spent three years studying drama at the Manchester Metropolitan School of Theatre.

== Career ==
Although best known for her television roles, Burton had worked almost exclusively in the theatre prior to landing the role of Heather Haversham in Channel 4's Liverpool-based flagship soap opera Brookside. After four years in the role, during which time Heather had become one of the show's most popular characters, Burton began to "lose sympathy" with Heather and decided to leave. Following her departure her television work consisted mainly of guest appearances, with parts in a number of peak-time drama series including Minder, Inspector Morse, Boon, Medics, Van Der Valk, Stay Lucky and Lovejoy.

In 1993, Burton starred alongside Kevin Whately in Peak Practice. She played the role of Doctor Beth Glover in the medical drama series, based in Derbyshire's Peak District, for three series until her departure in 1995. In 1996 she then took the main role of Professor Sam Ryan in the highly acclaimed BBC drama Silent Witness; she held this role until 2004. Though her decision to portray Ryan as a reflective personality – sometimes staring into space – was satirised by the comedienne Jennifer Saunders, she helped lay the groundwork for what was to become one of the most popular BBC series, continuing to run, albeit without her, until her return in 2021.

After Silent Witness, she took on the title role of Prosecutor Helen West in a series based on Frances Fyfield's novels. She also played Aunt Polly in a 2003 remake of Pollyanna and Commander Clare Blake in Lynda La Plante's drama The Commander.

In 2010, Burton appeared in the sixth series of BBC drama Waterloo Road as new headteacher Karen Fisher, and departed the show in 2011. She took part in BBC One's Celebrity Masterchef and made it through to the semi-finals. She appeared as gangster's wife Cherie Le Saux in ITV drama The Level in Autumn 2016. In 2020, she had a starring role as crime family matriarch Katherine Maguire in the third season of Marcella.

== Personal life ==
In 1976 Burton married theatre technician Jonathan Hartley, whom she met while at Manchester School of Theatre. They divorced in 1982. She married professional photographer Sven Arnstein in 1989, and the couple had two daughters before divorcing in 2004. Burton currently lives in Hastings, East Sussex (in 2016).

== Charity ==
Burton is an ambassador for The Children's Trust, a UK charity for children with brain injury and neurodisability.

== Filmography ==
=== Film ===
Year	Title	Role
2009	Bronson	Charlie's Mum
2017	The Dog with the Woman	Alice Wilson
2020	Body of Water	Susan

=== Television ===
Year	Title	Role	Notes
1982–1986	Brookside	Heather Haversham	Regular role; 249 episodes
1987–1988	Boon	Margaret Daly	Main role; 14 episodes
1988	Inspector Morse	Mirella Lunghi	Episode: "The Settling of the Sun"
1989	Where There's A Will	Alice	Television film
1989	Frederick Forsyth Presents	Nicola	Episode: "A Casualty of War"
1990	Medics	Vikki	Episode: "Jessica"
1990	The Storyteller: Greek Myths	Aithra	1 episode
1991	Van der Valk	Elly van Roekel	Episode: "Doctor Hoffmann's Children"
1991	Stay Lucky	Jane Higgs	Episode: "The Food of Love"
1992	Lovejoy	Bonnie Wright	Episode: "Kids"
1993	Minder	Prosecuting Counsel	Episode: "Looking for Mr. Goodtime"
1993–1995	Peak Practice	Dr. Beth Glover/Kerruish	Regular role; 36 episodes
1996	Screen Two	Rosie Willis	Episode: "The Precious Blood"
1996–2004, 2022	Silent Witness	Prof. Sam Ryan	Regular role; 61 episodes
1998	The Gift	Lynn	Television film
1999	Forgotten	Rachel Monroe/Carla Hayden	3 episodes
2000	Little Bird	Rachel Lewis	Television film
2001	The Whistle-Blower	Laura Tracey	2 episodes
2002	The Helen West Casebook	Helen West	3 episodes
2003	Pollyanna	Aunt Polly	Television film
2003–2008	The Commander	Commander Clare Blake	Main role; 17 episodes
2009	Agatha Christie's Marple	Sister Clotilde	Episode: "Nemesis"
2010–2011	Waterloo Road	Karen Fisher	Regular role; 28 episodes
2015	Midsomer Murders	Carole Latimer	Episode: "Murder by Magic"
2016	The Level	Cherie Le Saux	6 episodes
2020	White House Farm	June Bamber	6 episodes
2020	Marcella	Katherine Maguire	8 episodes
2021	Anne Boleyn	Anne Shelton	3 episodes

=== Presenter ===
Year	Title	Notes
2013	Amanda Burton: Killer Forensics	Discovery

== Awards and nominations ==
Year	Organisation	Category	Nominated work	Result
1998	National Television Award	Most Popular Actress	Silent Witness	Won
1999	National Television Award	Most Popular Actress	Silent Witness	Won
1999	TV Quick Award	Best Actress	Silent Witness	Won
2001	National Television Award	Most Popular Actress	Silent Witness	Won
2003	National Television Award	Most Popular Actress	Silent Witness	Nominated
2004	IFTA Award	Best Actress in a TV Drama	Silent Witness	Nominated
2011	TV Quick Award	Best Actress	Waterloo Road	Won
