= Leanne Powell =

Fictional character from Brookside

- Brookside character
- Portrayed by: Vickie Gates
- Duration: 1992–1993, 1997, 2000–2003
- First appearance: 29 January 1992
- Last appearance: 26 April 2003
- Introduced by: Paul Marquess (2000)
In-universe information
- Occupation: Student; Prostitute; Barmaid; Cashier
- Father: Ted Powell
- Mother: Mrs Powell
- Brothers: Lance Powell

Leanne Powell is a fictional character from the British Channel 4 soap opera Brookside, played by Vickie Gates. The character debuted on-screen in the episode airing on 29 January 1992. Gates was sixteen when she joined the cast. Leanne is introduced into the series as a friend of Katie Rogers (Diane Burke) and is portrayed as bad influence on her friends. Brookside's executive producer Mal Young believed there was a need to include more teenage centric stories and created a peer pressure plot for the character. Leanne was portrayed as attempting to seduce Owen Daniels (Danny McCall). Writers also explored the issue of teenage pregnancy with Leanne and her friend's mother, DD Dixon (Irene Marot) helps her arrange a termination in secret.

Gates left the series in 1993 but reprised the role in 1997. Writers made Leanne more outlandish and portrayed her as a prostitute. She propositions David Crosbie (John Burgess) and gets disowned by her friend Jacqui Dixon (Alex Fletcher). Leanne seeks revenge and sprays acid into Jacqui's eyes, which results in Leanne going to prison. In 2000, Brookside producer Paul Marquess reintroduced the character having been impressed by Gates' work on another television series. Marquess developed the character further and introduced her brother, Lance Powell (Mickey Poppins) and created a relationship with Christy Murray (Glyn Pritchard). Other stories include Leanne's friendship and feud with Bev McLoughlin (Sarah White).

Leanne is characterised as a nasty and devious woman. Gates has stated that Leanne always believes she is right and is unapologetic about her behaviour. Leanne's manipulative behaviour caused television critics to review her behaviour. Some assessed that Leanne's deviousness grew as writers developed her more.

== Development ==
=== Introduction and characterisation ===
Gates was sixteen when she joined the cast of Brookside, but Leanne was originally portrayed as a fifteen-year old school girl. Leanne was introduced into the series in 1992. She was a school friend of Katie Rogers (Diane Burke) who she became a bad influence on.

Leanne is portrayed as a villainous character. Gates loved playing the "evil part" of Leanne and did not want to play a "nice" version of her. Gates added that "she's great, nice and feisty and I wouldn't like to play her any other way." Gates found it difficult to concentrate when portraying Leanne's nasty personality. To aid her performance, Gates stated "I use an age-old saying - If you think you are beautiful you will come across as beautiful... so I just reverse that!" Gates characterised Leanne as a dishonest women incapable of even being honest with herself. She added that Leanne is "mad, bad and feisty." Gates told a reporter from The Sunday People that playing Leanne "has left me with the worst frown lines imaginable because I had to walk around all week being vile and pulling faces."

Gates believed that Leanne's characterisation of the teenage and adult incarnations differed greatly. A sympathetic Gates recalled "I felt sorry for her when she was young as nobody really liked her." She branded Leanne "very intense" but once she grew up she "lightened up a bit". She became "so nasty and very cheeky", which Gates relished portraying.

=== Peer pressure and pregnancy ===
In one of Leanne's first prominent storylines, writers explored the issue of teenage peer pressure. Leanne uses her friendship with Katie in an attempt to seduce her sister, Sammy Rogers' (Rachael Lindsay) boyfriend, Owen Daniels (Danny McCall). Leanne continues to pester Owen. The storyline was created by Brookside's executive producer Mal Young. He believed that the show needed to include more teenage stories, such as peer pressure to have sex. When Owen does not respond to her advances, Leanne falsely claims they have had sex to ruin his relationship with Sammy. Gates told an Inside Soap reporter that "that's classic Leanne behaviour. She says she sleeps with fellas because she thinks her friends expect it of her." Gates added that peer pressure causes her behaviour, adding "she's suffering from the worst case of peer pressure I think I've ever known." Leanne responds by losing her virginity to Paul, who is the ex-boyfriend of her friend Jacqui Dixon (Alex Fletcher).

In December 1992, Brookside broadcast a new story for Leanne which explored the issue of teenage pregnancy. Leanne is shocked to discover that she is pregnant with Paul's child and becomes determined to have an abortion. Katie and Jacqui try to support Leanne, but they are portrayed as being naïve when it comes to Leanne's options about her pregnancy. Gates explained that Leanne is "really scared" of her parents discovering her pregnancy because they are "really strict" with her. Leanne concocts a plan to terminate the pregnancy herself by getting drunk. Gates added "she wants to keep it quiet. She really doesn't have a clue about what's happening to her. Leanne's only 15 and she thinks that if she drinks enough gin, she'll miscarry." DD Dixon (Irene Marot) discovers that Leanne is pregnant and Leanne threatens to commit suicide if she informs her parents. DD ignores her husband's advice and helps Leanne to arrange a termination in secret. Gates found Leanne being suicidal "very difficult to film" and warned viewers that "the worst is yet to come." Gates left the series in 1993 but agreed to reprise the role in 1996.

=== Prostitution and acid attack ===
In 1997, Leanne returns to the area and it is revealed that she is now a prostitute. Leanne and her friends use Bar Brookie as a place to find custom. The bar belongs to Leanne's friend Jacqui, so Leanne keeps their activity a secret. Despite their past friendship, Leanne and Jacqui both changed drastically. Jacqui became a successful business woman and Leanne became a prostitute hanging around in the "Merseyside underworld". Leanne later meets pensioner David Crosbie (John Burgess) in the bar and begins talking to him. Unbeknownst to Leanne, David is gay. Burgess told Helen Childs from Inside Soap that "David and Leanne seem to have a lot in common" because Leanne lies to him. She claims to have been born in Germany and used to live at the Dixon house, where David now lives. Leanne asks David if she can come over to see the house once again, which he agrees to. Leanne then propositions David for sex, Burgess said that his character was "absolutely appalled" by her behaviour. Fletcher assessed that David "nearly died" when Leanne propositioned him and threw her out. Leanne then begins to blackmail David, threatening to tell his neighbours that he took her back to his home for sex. Burgess added "he almost weakens" but then he reveals that he is gay and no one will believe her. David then has to decide whether or not to tell Jacqui about Leanne using Bar Brookie for prostitution or save himself any further embarrassment.

Fletcher told Peter Grant from Liverpool Echo that Jacqui is initially refuses to believe Bing and accuses him of "slagging off her bezzie mate." Jacqui feels betrayed when she discovers Leanne is a prostitute and has been using her bar, Fletcher assessed that "all hell broke loose". She told Inside Soap's Childs that Jacqui is emotional because her friend betrayed her trust. She explained that "Jacqui never guessed what Leanne was up to. Leanne kept making sexual innuendoes, but then she's always been like that! Jacqui is gutted when she finds out what's she's done. She's upset, angry and hurt." Leanne later returned and tries to buy a drink in Bar Brookie. Jacqui confronts Leanne and tries to throw her out. Leanne retaliates by spraying acid into Jacqui's eyes. The incident leaves Jacqui with temporary blindness and Leanne is arrested for assault. Leanne is sentenced to three years in prison for her crime.

=== 2000 return ===
In 2000, Brookside producer Paul Marquess reintroduced the character and her brother Lance Powell (Mickey Poppins). Marquess has previously worked with Gates on the soap opera Springhill and was impressed by her work. Marquess reintroduced Leanne alongside two other former characters Bev McLoughlin (Sarah White) and Nisha Batra (Sunetra Sarker). The producer's decision proved popular as all three characters proved to be more successful than their original stints in the show.

In January 2001, Gates signed a new one-year contract to remain on the show. Gates stated that she wanted to remain in the show for years. She revealed "I think there are lots more things Leanne can do. So as long as I'm enjoying it I hope to stay." Gates also announced that writers were planning a new romance story for Leanne. She noted that the character had been single for a long time, dating back to before she was sent to prison. Marquess revealed that he had planned "some cracking Leanne stories" for the year ahead. He revealed that "she is going to make life difficult for a lot of people, and believe it or not she is going to find love." Leanne's new romance was developed with Christy Murray (Glyn Pritchard). The pair begin a sexual relationship in March 2001. Their relationship begins in special episodes set in seaside town Southport. Bev organises a day trip to the town to celebrate the first anniversary of Bar Brookie's opening. Leanne joins Bev, Lance and The Murray family on the trip. Gates told Francesca Babb from All About Soap that "they're all out to have a laugh" but Leanne is particularly excited because she has decided to snare herself a man. Gates explained that "Leanne really falls for her new man, although I don't think the feeling is particularly reciprocated." Gates revealed that Leanne is "desperate for some romance" because she had not had a boyfriend since she was released from prison. Leanne believes the best way to get together with Christy is via sex and she seduces him in a minibus before having sex with him. They are caught by Diane Murray (Bernie Nolan) who finds Leanne's underwear on the floor.

Writers often created comedy storylines for Leanne. In December 2002, she was pitted against local businessman Ron Dixon (Vince Earl) as they start their own rival market stands. Earl told a reporter from the Liverpool Echo that Leanne sets her own stall up to challenge Ron. He thinks he has the monopoly on the bus stop and "there's a lot of humour and tension when they operate a price war with some daft creative sales pitches." A Mersey TV publicist revealed that Leanne enlists Christy to help her win the feud and he dresses up as Santa to rival Ron's festive attire.

One of Leanne's main stories was her friendship and later feud with Bev. She given her a job at her bar and offered Leanne a stable life. Leanne tricks Bev into allowing her to manage the bar in her absence. Unbeknownst to Bev, Leanne had fooled her into going on the run from the police. Writers heavily featured Christy in the story as he begins to influence Leanne's behaviour. Christy starts selling stolen goods in the bar and Lance discovers his crimes. Christy wants to discredit Lance and turn Leanne against him. Christy tells Leanne that Lance is being unprofessional and tried to seduce a customer. Leanne believes Christy's lies and sacks her own brother. Poppins told an Inside Soap reporter that Lance is "gobsmacked" by Leanne's behaviour. He believed it allowed for a "brilliant story" in which Bev and Lance could gain their revenge. Poppins added "it's the ultimate insult what Leanne has done to Lance, so it'd be lovely if Lance and Bev marched back into the bar in a blaze of glory."

Leanne fails to manage the bar correctly and leads it into financial ruin. When Bev returns, she is shocked at the state Leanne has left her business in and ends their friendship. Leanne is disgruntled that Bev forgives her brother, Lance and assumes she can lie her way out of trouble. Gates told Wendy Granditer from Inside Soap that Bev is "devastated" to find her bar ruined and "deservedly, Leanne has been No. 1 on her hitlist." Leanne tries to convince Bev that Christy ruined her business but she refuses to believe her former friend. Bev then throws a bucket of water over Leanne leaving her humiliated. Leanne responds by smashing Bev's bar up with a hammer, ensuring her business cannot recover. Bev confronts Leanne at the local petrol station and a fight occurs. Gates explained that Leanne does not admit guilt over the vandalism but "can't resist winding Bev up" and in "a moment of madness" Bev attacks Leanne. The fight occurs in front of a CCTV camera and Brookside residents Max Farnham (Steven Pinder) and Adele Murray (Katy Lamont).

Gates revealed that Leanne vows "to take Bev for everything she's got" for fighting with her and sues her. But Leanne leaves the fight without any injuries. Gates found it amusing that writers incorporated Christy in Leanne's money making scams. The team up to feign an injury, with Christy hitting Leanne with a leg of lamb to cause swelling and bruising. Gates added that Leanne then goes to seek legal advice and does not feel guilty about further escalating her feud with Bev. Gates stated "as far as Leanne's concerned, it's a case of more fool Bev for believing her and going away in the first place. She's not bothered about what she's done, despite the kindness Bev has shown her in the past." Gates believed that Leanne's behaviour was caused by her unwillingness to accept she is wrong, "no matter how badly she behaves". Leanne's behaviour during her feud story made Gates feel uneasy in public. She told Granditer that she feared Leanne's continued revenge plans against Bev left her worried about viewer reaction. She added that while Leanne destroyed Bev's business, she received "very disapproving looks" while out in public but jested they were "too scared" to approach her because of Leanne's "nasty" persona.

In another storyline, Leanne falsely accuses her GP doctor Darren Roebuck (Timothy Deenihan) of sexual harassment. Leanne's lies put Darren's career in jeopardy but the dispute is later resolved. When Leanne breaks up with Christy, Darren feels sorry for Leanne and offers her support. Leanne realises that Darren is nice and she develops feelings for him. Darren tries to avoid Leanne's advances and makes it clear he loves his posh girlfriend Victoria Wilcox (Patricia Potter). Leanne ignores Darren's protests and begins dressing like Victoria and copying her accent. Darren is forced to tell Leanne what he really thinks about her and that he would never date her.

== Reception ==
In January 1993, an Inside Soap writer branded Leanne as "Brookside's biggest troublemaker", adding that she "was heading for her biggest dose of trouble yet" via her teenage pregnancy storyline. Some viewers found it difficult to distinguish Gates' portrayal of nasty Leanne from reality. Gates used to receive fan mail from viewers telling her that they hated her but loved Lance. At the time, Gates quipped "I think they're scared of me!" While interviewed by Maxine Gordon from The Press recalled one occasion where a female fan approached her asking her to be nasty to her, like Leanne would behave. Gordon also branded Leanne a "bad-girl barmaid". Similarly, a reporter from The Observer called Leanne a "bad girl" type of character. A reporter from The Sunday People described her as the "Brookside superbitch". A Teesside Gazette journalist enjoyed Leanne and Bev's scenes. They observed that "Leanne Powell, the close's original bad girl has provided some quality dialogue this week and the return of Bev has brought out the best in her...so to speak. The two are like a pair of bulldogs in a bar." Merle Brown from the Daily Record branded Leanne as "horrendous, but at the same time, brilliant".

A writer from The Herald identified Leanne as a "trouble-maker". John Kelly from Wexford People branded Leanne the "rat of the week". He opined that Leanne had "always been a nasty piece of work" but "delves into new depths of deviousness" when she destroys Bev's bar. An Inside Soap critic opined that Leanne changed from "demon to lovesick poodle" in regards to Darren. They branded her an "evil trollop" and added that Darren "wouldn't touch her with a 10-foot bargepole." She concluded that once Darren left she dropped her posh façade and returned to type.

Lynda Gilby praised Brookside for portraying their "preposterous" stories with "charm and conviction" unlike other soaps and used Leanne's return as her prime example. Gilby branded the character as "rough and evil" with a face like "a bag full of spanners". She opined that Leanne had "psychopathic tendencies" especially when she accused Darren of assault. She branded Gates' performance during Leanne's admission she lied about Darren's assault as "quite impressive", noting the camera "lingered on her chilling expression of sheer naked venom" indicating Leanne would seek further revenge. Gilby believed that Brookside's eccentric women such as Leanne were given the best dialogue. She reviewed Leanne berating a half-naked Max Farnham as some of the show's "best lines". Her colleague, Andrea McVeigh opined that Brookside was increasingly becoming over the top and deluded characters such as Leanne made manic Jimmy Corkhill (Dean Sullivan) appear sane. She added that Leanne was "not one to take rejection very well". Anne-Marie O'Connor from New Ross Standard called Leanne "one nasty piece of work". She assessed that Leanne blackmailing behaviour towards Darren and Victoria was "nasty stuff" and branded her a "rotten girl".

Helen Childs (Inside Soap) branded the character "the Parade's own scarlet woman". Jim Shelley writing for The Guardian branded her "lying Leanne" and criticised Brookside's writing. Shelley added "it's no wonder Professor Phil and his mates can create character as full of lying rubbish as Leanne. They wouldn't know anything even vaguely truthful or realistic if it hit them over the 'ed." The Guardian's Gareth McLean branded Leanne and Lance "troglodytes of the lowest order". Their colleague Rupert Smith bemoaned the on-screen intimacy between Leanne and Christy, predicting they gave a "perfunctory performance". Sunday Life's Gilby believed that Leanne and Christy continued the show's trend of creating "unlikely couples". She assessed that he was the "cynical" and "seven stone" Christy who launched himself onto the "desperate" and "billowing scarlet satin bolster" Leanne. Inside Soap's Granditer assessed that Leanne "has always been a nasty piece of work" but managed "to plumb new depths of deviousness" when she took revenge on Bev.
