= Mike Dixon (Brookside) =

Fictional character from Brookside

- Brookside character
- Portrayed by: Paul Byatt
- Duration: 1990–2003
- First appearance: 1 October 1990
- Last appearance: 28 October 2003
- Created by: Phil Redmond
In-universe information
- Occupation: Bartender; Schoolteacher
- Father: Ron Dixon
- Mother: DD Dixon
- Stepmother: Anthea Dixon (1999–2001); Bev Dixon (2003–present)
- Brothers: Tony Dixon
- Sisters: Jacqui Farnham
- Half-sisters: Megan Brindley
- Wife: Rachel Jordache (2000–present)
- Sons: Josh Dixon; Michael Dixon
- Daughters: Beth Dixon
- Grandfathers: Cyril Dixon
- Grandmothers: Mabel Dixon
- Uncles: Derek O'Farrell
- Aunts: Mary Dixon; Pat
- Nephews: Harry Farnham
- Nieces: Esme Dixon

Michael "Mike" Dixon is a fictional character from the British Channel 4 soap opera Brookside, played by Paul Byatt. The character debuted on-screen during the episode broadcast on 1 October 1990.

== Casting ==
Byatt began playing Mike in 1990. Byatt's brother and three sisters had previously appeared in Brookside playing recurring roles. Of this Byatt stated that "turning out cast members for Brookside is a family industry." When Byatt finished his A levels, he followed the family tradition of auditioning for Brookside. Unlike his siblings, Byatt secured a regular role on the show. The Byatt's success of being cast in Brookside can be attributed to their mother owning a casting agency. Byatt recalled "I was on my summer holidays and just heard about the audition because my mum’s got an agency. I kind of fell into it, and here I am 12 years later."

== Development ==
Mike is characterised as a "streetwise but likeable youth" with a keen interest in music and forming his own band. Byatt told Geoff Tibbals, author of Brookside The First 10 Years, that Mike "was ok and next to someone like Sinnott, he appeared an angel. But then he started robbing from his dad." Mike's wayward behaviour included stealing from his father's shop till and taking a dead man's war medals. Byatt added "the trouble with Mike is that he thinks he's clever – he reckons he knows more than his dad. He also thinks he can fend for himself but he can't." The actor believed Mike "hasn't a clue about money" and that is the cause of his credit card debt problems. Mike purchases an electric organ and begins stealing to pay off his debt. In the book Brookside The Early Years, Byatt told Tibbals that writers had changed Mike to become wiser than his father. He added "Ron's made a bit of a mess of his life and Mike's determined not to make the same mistakes."

A writer from the official Brookside website wrote that Mike "didn't waste anytime in ruffling the neighbours' feathers" upon his arrival. They assessed that later in the character's tenure he had become a family man "finding life a struggle". In the book 20 Years of Brookside, author Graham Kibble-White described Mike as "one of life's losers with a succession of dead end jobs and constant money worries."

Writers created a romance storyline between Mike and his neighbour Lindsey Corkhill (Claire Sweeney). She is already married to Gary Stanlow (Andrew Fillis), a drug dealer who neglects Lindsey in favour of his crime business. Sweeney told Victoria Ross from Inside Soap that Lindsey "fell in love with Mike almost at first sight". She defended the affair noting that Lindsey was young, her husband was elsewhere and their connection means "there's really nothing she can do about it, even though she's being unfaithful to Gary." Mike and Lindsey's first kiss was filmed on location on a Mersey Ferry and Sweeney revealed she was nervous about filming in public. After their kiss the two continue their affair but keep it a secret from their families. Writers had created an extended feud between the Dixon and Corkhill families, especially between the patriarchs Ron and Jimmy Corkhill (Dean Sullivan). The latter caused the death of Mike's brother, Tony (Mark Lennock), in a car accident. Ron had never forgiven Jimmy and Sweeney added "It's a bit of a Romeo and Juliet situation, because Ron hates everyone connected to Jimmy Corkhill."

Writers continued to develop their romance to the stage that Lindsey considers leaving her husband. Byatt told Inside Soap's Jon Peake that Mike "really loves" Lindsey and is "very optimistic" about their relationship. Byatt believed that Lindsey was better off without Gary. He added "Mike feels convinced that what they've got going is the real thing because of the instant attraction they both felt when they met. She was fed up with her useless husband and then she met Mike, who is sensitive and understanding, and everything Gary isn't." Mike is not phased that Lindsey already has a child and Byatt explained that it was testament to Mike's characterisation. Mike often acts on attraction and "deals with the baggage later".

Lindsey decides to leave Gary and publicises her relationship with Mike. When Ron and his partner Bev McLoughlin (Sarah White) go away on holiday, Mike moves Lindsey and Kylie into the Dixon family home. They then have to contend with the fallout that comes from the warring families. Byatt explained that Jimmy would never harm the Dixons again after being responsible for Tony's death. However Ron returns he goes ballistic, but he eventually sees that Mike is serious about Lindsey. Writers played on the threat that Gary posed to their relationship. Byatt addressed the fact that Mike is unaware of how dangerous Gary is and is therefore "he's not scared of him". After this Mike realises that they cannot live on Brookside Close alongside Gary and the feuding families. Mike's friend Keith invites him, Lindsey and Kylie to live in Turkey and work at a bar. Byatt branded it the opportunity that the pair had been seeking and "their big chance at happiness".

One of the character's most controversial storylines was being arrested for drug trafficking. When Lindsey's mother Jackie Corkhill (Sue Jenkins) discovers that Gary has got Jimmy embroiled in his drug dealing business she leave him. Jackie decides help Mike, Lindsey and Kylie flee the United Kingdom and start a new life in Australia. Lindsey continued to hide inside the Dixon house fearing that Gary will find her. They are so scared of Gary, that Lindsey hides in the boot of Mike's car to escape the area. Sweeney explained that leaving was their "only option". Mike Jackie accompanies the trio to the airport and ensures they depart safely. However, Jackie does not realise that Gary discovered her plan and has already planted the drug heroin in Kylie's soft toy. Mike and Lindsey are arrested in Bangkok and charged with drug smuggling, later being sent to a Thai prison. Producers wanted to make the story authentic but struggled create a Thai airport set. The scenes were not scheduled to be filmed at Bangkok airport and researchers could not find any photos of the interior or information in aviation magazines. Producers contacted the managing director of the Airport Authority of Thailand for help, who provided them with photographs, brochures and newsletters to help them recreate the setting.

Jackie decides to start a campaign to free "the Bangkok three". Jenkins told an Inside Soap reporter that Jackie fears she may never see Lindsey again and creates the campaign. She added that Jackie had "done everything to help them start a new life. Now it's backfired." Sweeney was hopeful that the drug storyline would not destroy Mike and Lindsey's relationship. The pair spend months in the Thai prison system but Jackie's campaign does result in Kylie being returned to the United Kingdom. Jimmy and Ron then decide to end their feud and travel to Thailand together in an effort to secure the release of their children. The journey is unsuccessful and they are forced to return home. The pair then enlist the help of neighbour David Crosbie (John Burgess) and their local member of parliament and travel to London. They secure meetings with foreign office ministers and members of the Thai embassy, which have a positive effect on the case. After his ordeal, Mike decides he wants to become a writer and begins a book about his experience. While interviewed on the 2000 documentary 18 Years Young, Byatt recalled "the prison scenes were good scenes to do... It was a good storyline. The only problem with it was I was out of the programme. I was in jail for four months." Mike and Lindsey later break-up. Byatt did not want Mike and Lindsey to settle down together. He thought Mike was far too young and should have been "going out and sowing his wild oats".

Writers then created another affair story for Mike and his older married neighbour Bel Simpson (Lesley Nightingale). When Mike finds Bel drunk in Bar Brookie, he walks her home. Bel invites Mike into her home for a drink. She begins to complain about her sex life with husband Ollie Simpson (Michael J. Jackson). This prompts Mike to attempt to leave but Bel kisses him and they have sex. Writers intended it to be a one time encounter with ensuing drama. Byatt told Steven Murphy from Inside Soap that Mike sees Bel as "another notch on his bedpost" and Bel is "totally paranoid about the whole thing." Mike discusses their affair with Ben O'Leary (Simon Paul), which upsets Bel who wants to keep it a secret from Ollie.

Byatt assessed that Mike is worried that Ollie will find out and violently confront him. He added "I don't think he wants to be a marriage breaker either" because Mike had already destroyed Lindsey and Gary's marriage. Byatt believed that the story put Mike back into the forefront of the show's dramatic stories after having a quiet time writing a book. He concluded "I'm pleased he's got that silly idea of the book out of his head and he's getting out and about and up to mischief, after all the stuff he's been through over the last year, with Bangkok and Lindsey, he deserves to have a good time."

== Storylines ==
He is the eldest son of Ron (Vince Earl) and "DD" Dixon (Irene Mariot), and the brother of Tony (Gerald Bostock, later Mark Lennock) and Jacqui (Alexandra Fletcher). Mike was involved in two major storylines in 1993, the most significant of which was his relationship with stepmother Bev McLoughlin (Sarah White) that resulted in the birth of their son Josh, who was originally believed to have been his brother. This resulted in the break-up of his father and stepmother's relationship.

1993 was also the year that Mike's younger brother Tony (then played by Gerald Bostock) was left in a coma after a car crash which claimed the life of neighbour Frank Rogers (Peter Christian) in November. Tony died three months later having never regained full consciousness, and at the funeral Jimmy confessed that he was the driver of the other car which had caused Frank's car to crash.

Mike later married Rachel Jordache (Tiffany Chapman) and their daughter Beth was born in early 2000. But another tragedy struck in December that year when Mike was badly injured in a car crash involving a stolen car being driven by Tim O'Leary (Philip Olivier). Clint Moffat (Greg Pateras) suffered a broken arm in the collision, while Robbie Moffat (Neil Davies) and Tim fled the scene uninjured. Mike had suffered a major spinal injury and used a wheelchair for six months after the crash, and even after leaving his wheelchair he spent several more months on crutches.

Mike's father Ron received a nine-month prison sentence for firearms offences in December 2001 (although he was cleared of alternative more serious charges of manslaughter and murder), and by the time Mike left the Close in 2003 he was rarely featured in significant storylines. Mike later landed a job at Brookside Comprehensive as a teacher. After splitting up with Rachel, he witnessed the birth of his son, Michael Jr. When Ron and Bev became engaged, Josh asked Ron if he would adopt him. Ron was flattered by the offer and agreed. Ron and Bev then got a solicitor to finalise the arrangements. Mike however refused to give his permission, preventing the adoption from taking place.

== Reception ==
In 2003, Frances Traynor from the Daily Record named the Mike and Lindsey being arrested for drug trafficking in Thailand one of Brookside's "most controversial plotlines". Inside Soap reporter Jon Peake branded it "one of soap's hardest-hitting storylines" and emphasised that the issue was a common occurrence in the 1990s. Lorna Hughes from the Liverpool Echo said that Brookside was known for its controversial stories. However she believed that Mike and Lindsey's arrest in Thailand was a less well remembered storyline.

Merle Brown (Daily Record) ridiculed Mike and Rachel's relationship. They questioned: "what's she doing hanging about with him anyway and, from his point of view, how could you listen to her whingeing voice day in, day out?" A critic from The Guardian included Mike in an article written to ridicule soap characters. Of Mike they wrote "Mike Dixon is feared brain-dead (as usual)." A writer from Inside Soap branded Mike a "beardy-weirdy" and "the hairiest, unluckiest bloke in soap". They added that "Mike's track record in the romance department leaves a great deal to be desired." Their colleague Victoria Ross branded Mike "Brookside's best looking resident".
