= List of Brookside characters =

This is a comprehensive list of characters from the Channel 4 soap opera Brookside in alphabetical order by the character's surnames.

== A ==
Character	Actor	Duration
Roger Abbott	Andy Williams	1998–1999
Tom Ainsworth	Barny Clevely	2000
Richard Almond	Nicholas Donovan	1987
Charlotte Andersen	Emma Owen	1999–2000
Ian Anderson	Paul Baden	1989
Paul Anderson	Philip Madoc	1995
Philip Andrews	Gary Brown	1989
Jackie Armstrong	James Garbutt	1984
Tom Ashby	Peter Alexander	1992–1993

== B ==
Character	Actor	Duration	Ref(s)
Jeff Bacon	Christopher Wild	1982–1983	
Carl Banks	Stephen Donald	1994–1995	
Eddie Banks	Paul Broughton	1994–1996	
Lee Banks	Matthew Lewney	1994–1996	
Rebecca Banks	Laura Mangen	1994–1996	
Rosie Banks	Susan Twist	1994–1996	
Sarah Banks	Andrea Marshall	1994–1996	
Claire Bannister	Jean Rimmer	1984	
Nigel Bannister	Ellis Dale	1984–1985	
Anne Barber	Laura Calland	1988	
Marcia Barrett	Cheryl Maiker	1990–1993	
Krishnan Batra	Mohammed Ashiq	1989	
Manju Batra	Jamila Massey	1989	
Nisha Batra	Sunetra Sarker	1988–1991, 2000–2003	
Carl Beacham	David Groves	2000–2001	
Gill Beaconsfield	Sally Cranfield	1986	
Ross Beecham	Ian Champion	1998, 2000	
Fiona Bell	Judy Sweeney	1985	
Judith Benison	Carol Ann Crawford	1989–1990	
Frank Bennett	John Gillett	1984	
Sol Bennett	Danny Lawrence	2002	
Charlie Benson	Roy Brandon	1990–1991	
Maria Benson	Pauline Daniels	1990–1991	
Simon Benson	Andrew Fearon	1990–1991	
Tom Billington	Michael Simkins	2003	
Sam Bishop	David Roper	1991	
Adam Black	Toby King	1986	
Barbara Black	Brenda Elder	1986	
Nicholas Black	Alan Rothwell	1985–1986	
Ruth Black	Joanne Sidwell	1986	
Scott Black	Philip Glancy	1986	
Ellie Blackshaw	Gedren Heller	1987	
Neil Bond	Hugo Chandor	1998	
Mary Bowers	Raine Janna	2000	
Shelley Bowers	Alexandra Wescourt	1999–2001	
Cheryl Boyanowsky	Jennifer Calvert	1988–1989	
Joe Boyanowsky	Ted Stidder	1988	
Anne Bradley	Faith Brown	1996	
JC Bradley	Ken Sharrock	1996–1997	
Helen Brennan	Joanne Sherryden	1999	
Sharon Bridges	Hayley Smitten	1997–1998	
Megan Brindley	Cheryl Mackie	1998–1999	
Julia Broadbent	Beti Lloyd-Jones	1982	
Stan Broadbent	David Miller	1982–1983	
Julia Brogan	Gladys Ambrose	1985–1998	
Josie Brooks	Suzanne Packer	1990–1991, 1993, 2000	
Shaun Brookes	Richard Trinder	1995	
Ducksie Brown	Mark Birch	1982–1984, 1987	
Kirsty Brown	Joanne Black	1986–1989	
Eric Brunet	Alain Bourgouin	1996	
Dave Burns	Simon Chadwick	1999–2001	

== C ==
Character	Actor	Duration	Ref(s)
Mark Callaghan	Dean Williams	1986–1987	
Stella Campbell	Maggie Shevlin	1996	
Helen Carey	Kerry Peers	2001–2002	
Stephanie Carey	Zara Turner	2002	
Chris Carlton	Andy Henderson	1999	
Rufus Carmichael	Jimmy Gallagher	1998	
Bishop Carter	Benjamin Whitrow	1992	
Josh Carter	Paul Barnhill	1999	
Sharon Carter	Stephanie McGill	2002	
Janet Carver	Asia Duleah	1982–1983	
Carla Casey	Gail McKenna	1991	
Anne Cassidy	Margot Leicester	1996	
Martin Cathcart	James D'Arcy	1996	
Val Chang	Susan Leong	1983	
Miriam Charles	Rowena Cooper	1989	
Cassie Charlton	Ebony Grey	1996–1998	
Gladys Charlton	Eileen O'Brien	1996–1997	
Caroline Choi	Sarah Lam	1989–1990	
Jessica Choi	Anna Sung	1989–1990	
Michael Choi	David Yip	1989–1990	
Stephen Choi	Kwong Lee Chong	1989–1990	
Ben Christie	Jeff Diamond	1992	
Rachel Christie	Angela Brinkworth	1992	
Dave Clark	Rayner Bourton	1997	
Karyn Clark	Joanna Phillips-Lane	1992–1993	
Arthur Clarke	Peter Kerrigan	1982	
John Clarke	Robert Pugh	1985	
Eddie Cleary	Philip Walsh	1986	
Joe Cleary	Con O'Neill	1986	
Vicki Cleary	Cheryl Leigh	1985–1987	
Anne Clemence	Christine Moore	1992–1993	
Margaret Clemence	Nicola Stephenson	1990–1994	
Arthur Clough	Anthony Watson	1990–1991	
Imelda Clough	Billie Clements	2001–2002	
Jean Clough	Meryl Hampton	2003	
Kenny Clough	Keith Newby	2003	
Kevin Clough	Thomas Ryder	2002–2003	
Paul Clough	Neil Borg Olivier	2002	
PC Ian Coban	Tony Audenshaw	1993–1997	
Shane Cochran	Richard Norton	1995–1996	
Annabelle Collins	Doreen Sloane	1982–1990	
Gordon Collins	Nigel Crowley	1982–1984	
Gordon Collins	Mark Burgess	1986–1990	
Lucy Collins	Katrin Cartlidge	1982–1983, 1990	
Lucy Collins	Maggie Saunders	1985–1986	
Paul Collins	Jim Wiggins	1982–1990	
Bernie Connor	Claire Dahling	1999	
Jane Connor	Rachel Davies	1991	
Linda Connors	Madelaine Murthwaite	1996	
Ted Cook	Brian Grellis	1985–1986	
Billy Corkhill	John McArdle	1985–1990 (Note: McArdle made a crossover appearance as Billy on Hollyoaks in 2025.)	
Diana Corkhill	Paula Frances	1990–1993	
Don Corkhill	Bernard Merrick	1990	
Doreen Corkhill	Kate Fitzgerald	1985–1987, 1989–1990	
Jackie Corkhill	Sue Jenkins	1991–2001	
Jimmy Corkhill	Dean Sullivan	1986–2003	
Kylie Corkhill	Jessica Allen	1995–1997	
Kylie Corkhill	Hannah Dowd	1996–2001, 2003	
Lindsey Corkhill	Claire Sweeney	1991–1992, 1995–2003	
Little Jimmy Corkhill	George Christopher	1991–1992, 1996	
Rod Corkhill	Jason Hope	1985–1993, 2001	
Sheila Corkhill	Sue Johnston	1982–1990, 1997–1998 (Note: Johnston appeared as Sheila in the straight-to-video spinoffs The Lost Weekend and Friday the 13th, as well as a crossover appearance on Hollyoaks in 2025.)	
Tracy Corkhill	Justine Kerrigan	1985–1992, 2003	
William Corkhill	Jack Foran	1997–2001	
William Corkhill	Matthew Foran	1997–2001	
William Corkhill	Lewis Davies	1997–2001	
William Corkhill	Jack Mythen	2001–2003	
James Corran	Bruce Alexander	1999	
Trish Cosgrove	Majella Reynolds	1987	
Amber Costello	Crissy Rock	2001	
Lana Costello	Diana Ricardo	1989	
Stuart Coulter	Joe Dunlop	1991	
Alexandra Courtney	Anna Sambrooks	1998	
Martin Cox	Gerard Horan	1987	
Peter Crampton	James Telfer	1985	
Carl Crawford	Nicholas McKenna	1990–1991	
Don Crawford	John Atkinson	1987	
Geoff Cropper	Howard Ward	1984	
Clive Crosbie	Philip Bond	1993	
David "Bing" Crosbie	John Burgess	1992–1998	
Jean Crosbie	Marcia Ashton	1992–1996	
Penny Crosbie	Mary Tamm	1993–1995	
John Crosby	Peter Faulkner	1984	
Annie Cross	Georgina Smith	1982–1983	
Edna Cross	Betty Alberge	1983–1985	
Harry Cross	Bill Dean	1983–1990, 1999	
Kevin Cross	Stuart Organ	1984–1986, 1988–1989, 1999	
Charles Cuddington	Matthew Radford	2000	
Lady Hilary Cuddington	Angela Douglas	1999–2000	
Lord Robin Cuddington	Francis Matthews	1999–2000	
Nathan Cuddington	Marcus Hutton	1998–2000	
Bill Cummings	Anthony Naylor	1984	
Eddie Cunningham	Adrian Mills	1984	
Paul Cunningham	David John Pope	1991	
Julie Currie	Vanessa Massi	2002	
Graeme Curtis	David Banks	1991–1992	
Tina Curtis	Caitlin Grey	1999	
Jim Curzon	Bob Keegan	1985	
Tom Curzon	Brian L Stephens	1985	

== D ==
Character	Actor	Duration	Ref(s)
Karen Dalton	Amanda Humphrey	1998–2000	
Father Daly	Frank Crompton	1983–1984	
Father Daly	Henry Moxon	1985, 1987, 1989	
Joan Daniels	Paula Jacobs	1991–1992	
Louise Daniels	Reanne Henesy	1996	
Louise Daniels	Kimberley Beer	2001–2002	
Louise Daniels	Mariella Brown	2002	
Owen Daniels	Danny McCall	1989–1993	
Trevor Daniels	Stacy Davies	1991	
Tanya Davies	Joanne Davy	1996–1997	
David Davis	Terry Coates	1984	
Elvis Davis	Ray Burnside	1989	
Mavis Davis	Shirley Anne Selby	1989	
Charlie Dawson	Philip McGough	1986	
Oscar Dean	Ken Campbell	1993	
Lynne Dearman	Pamela Buckle	1984	
Benwall Deburau	Jackson Davies	1988	
Eric Dempster	Roger Walker	1987	
Toni Dench	Gilian Cally	1995	
Tim Derby	Christopher Blake	1991	
Richard de Saville	Robert Dallas	1985	
Rob Dexter	Paul Swinnerton	2002	
Lisa Dibbern	Debbie Bowers	1984–1985	
Mike Dickinson	Colin Rix	1984	
Alison Dicks	Louisa Rix	1995	
Ken Dinsdale	Eamon Boland	1986	
Sally Dinsdale	Kate Riding	1986	
Anthea Dixon	Barbara Hatwell	1998–2001	
Beth Dixon	Uncredited	1999–2003	
Bev Dixon	Sarah White	1993–1996, 1998–2003	
Cyril Dixon	Allan Surtees	1990–1991	
Deborah "DD" Dixon	Irene Marot	1990–1996, 2000–2001	
Josh Dixon	Adam McCoy	1998–2002	
Josh Dixon	Jack McMullen	2002–2003	
Mike Dixon	Paul Byatt	1990–2003	
Rachel Dixon	Tiffany Chapman	1993–2003	
Ron Dixon	Vince Earl	1990–2003	
Tony Dixon	Gerard Bostock	1990–1991	
Tony Dixon	Mark Lennock	1992–1994	
Lesley Donnelly	Sylvie Gatrill	1995	
Howard Drucker	Ian Gardiner	1984–1985	
Jane Drucker	Ann Aris	1984	
Christopher Duncan	Stifyn Parri	1986–1988	
Joanna Duncan	Sally Home	1985	
Andrew Dunn	Rodney Litchfield	1984	
Arthur Dutton	James Culshaw	1986	
Craig Dutton	David Hart	2000–2001	
Marianne Dwyer	Jodie Hanson	1992–1994	

== E ==
Character	Actor	Duration
Sandra Eastwood	Lesley Nicol	1999
Janet Eccles	Kate Doherty	2001
Eddie Eccleston	Billy Richo	1985
Dr. Michael Elliot	Michael Lees	1984
Diane Ellison	Anny Tobin	1989
Janice Evans	Lynda Thornhill	1995
Jeff Evans	Les Dennis	2001
Katrina Evans	Ann-Marie Davies	1998–2001
Tommy Evans	Harry Goodier	1989

== F ==
Character	Actor	Duration	Ref(s)
Bernard Fairchild	Colin Meredith	1995–1996	
Harvey Fairhurst	Edward Wiseman	1998–1999	
Annabella Fairlie	Nazene Langfield	1999	
Jo Fairlie	Julie Mullen	1998–1999	
Gerald Fallon	Bryan Matheson	1988–1989	
Mona Fallon	Margaret Clifton	1987–1989	
Wendy Farmer	Julie Westwood	1986	
Alice Farnham	Anna Norbury	1994–1997	
Emily Farnham	Victoria Bennett	1990–1993, 1995–1997	
Emma Farnham	Molly Stewart	1999–2003	
Harry Farnham	Michael Garrett	1998–2003	
Jacqui Farnham	Alex Fletcher	1990–2003, 2026-	
Matthew Farnham	Gareth Ryan Jones	1990–1993, 1995–1997	
Max Farnham	Steven Pinder	1990–2003	
Patricia Farnham	Gabrielle Glaister	1990–1996	
Thomas Farnham	Kieran Warham	1990–1997	
Sean Fay	Sean Wilson	2003	
Alison Fernie	Ellie Darvill	1987	
Andrew Fernie	Liam Byatt	1987	
Lisa Fernie	Jayne Byatt	1987	
Jayne Ferris	Helen Latham	1999	
Alasdair Finnegan	Freddie Boardley	1997, 1999–2000	
Callum Finnegan	Gerard Kelly	1997–2000	
Rose Finnegan	Amanda Noar	1997–2000	
Dawn Finney	Lesley-Anne Sharpe	1985	
Kenny Fisher	Terry John	1990	
Ricky Fisher	Matthew Scurfield	1990	
Emily Fleming	Sophie Kilmister	1986	
James Fleming	Gene Foad	1985–1986	
Penny Fleming	Jane Hayward	1986	
Geoffrey Fletcher	Chris Wright	1990–1991	
Lucinda Fletcher	Rachel Laurence	1991	
Mark Fletcher	Colin Baker	1995	
Anne Ford	Penelope Nice	1991	
Ted Fowler	John Matshikiza	1984	
Leon Francis	Gil Darnell	2000	
Mo Francis	Stephanie Fayerman	1986	

== G ==
Character	Actor	Duration	Ref(s)
Don Gannon	Seamus Newham	1999	
Rose Gannon	Nuala Walsh	1999	
Ray Gardner	Geoff Oldham	1988–1989	
John Garner	Edward Arthur	1982	
Ricky Garner	Peter Washington	2001	
Geoff Gee	John Jardine	1983	
Alec George	Ian Keith	2003	
Lucas George	Marcus Hercules	2002–2003	
Father Gibbons	Stephen Boxer	1985, 1987–1989	
Donna Gibson	Dianne Michaels	1988	
Franny Gibson	Luke Tittensor	2003	
Jenny Gibson	Amy Stratton	2003	
Louise Gibson	Joanna Foster	1989	
Niall Gibson	Elliott Tittensor	2003	
Terry Gibson	Greg Milburn	2002–2003	
Richard Gill	Peter John	1984	
Joey Godden	Carl Chase	1990–1991, 1997	
Fred Gonzales	Richard Calkin	2001	
Tony Goodridge	Andrew Neil	1997	
Alan Gordon	John Burton	2002	
Ali Gordon	Kris Mochrie	2002–2003	
Debbie Gordon	Annette Ekblom	2002–2003	
Kirsty Gordon	Jessica Noon	2002–2003	
Stuart Gordon	David Lyon	2002–2003	
Arthur Gordon-Davies	Timothy Bateson	1987	
Helen Gordon-Davies	Beth Ellis	1987	
Jonathan Gordon-Davies	Steven Pinner	1987–1990	
Laura Gordon-Davies	Jane Cunliffe	1987–1988	
Anne Gorman	Kathryn Hunt	1996	
Bob Gossage	Allan O'Keefe	1983	
Mark Gossage	Captain Mog	1983	
Barry Grant	Paul Usher	1982–1995, 1997–1998, 2003 (Note: Usher made a crossover appearance as Barry on Hollyoaks in 2025.)	
Bobby Grant	Ricky Tomlinson	1982–1988 (Note: Tomlinson made a crossover appearance as Bobby on Hollyoaks in 2025.)	
Claire Grant	Amy Lynch	1985–1990	
Damon Grant	Simon O'Brien	1982–1987	
Karen Grant	Shelagh O'Hara	1982–1986, 1988, 1990	
Alan Green	Michael Maynard	1985	
Desmond Greenall	Bernard Brown	1986, 1989	
Alison Gregory	Alyson Spiro	1989–1990	
Hattie Gregory	Kate Ball	1989–1990	
Pamela Gregson	Caroline Wildi	1985	
Stuart Griffiths	Danny McCarthy	1984–1985	
Alice Grogan	Valerie Griffiths	1985	

== H ==
Character	Actor	Duration	Ref(s)
Derek Halligan	Roger Abbott	1985	
David Halpin	Robert Hamilton	1983	
Jo Halsall	Susie Ann Watkins	1992–1993	
Nawaz Hamoud	Bhasker Patel	1992	
Tony Hampson	Alex Mousley	1989	
Pat Hancock	David Easter	1984–1987	
Janet Hansen	Cheryl Kennedy	1984–1985	
Grace Hardwick	Ruth Holden	1984	
Ralph Hardwick	Ray Dunbobbin	1984–1989	
Bill Hargreaves	Brian Southwood	1982–1983	
David Hargreaves	Stephen McGann	1985	
Jonathan Hargreaves	Randal Herley	1983–1984	
Billy Harper	Lyndam Gregory	1984	
Jane Harper	Ann Beach	1989–1990	
Joyce Harrington	Gil Brailey	1984–1986	
Tony Harris	Eric Deacon	1998	
Barbara Harrison	Angela Morant	1991–1993	
Eric Harrison	Chris Darwin	1982–1984	
Hugh Harrison	Michael Gardiner	1992	
Irene Harrison	Hilary Crane	1983	
John Harrison	Geoffrey Leesley	1991–1993	
Mike Harrison	John Markham	1985	
Molly Harrison	Hilda Fenemore	1988	
Peter Harrison	Robert Beck	1991–1993	
Michael Harvey	Philip Riam	1991	
Teddy Harvey	Graham Weston	1989	
Gill Haversham	Eve Pearce	1983, 1985	
Heather Haversham	Amanda Burton	1982–1986	
Jack Haversham	Kevin Flood	1983	
Jack Haversham	Liam O'Callaghan	1986	
Bruno Hawkes	Mark Frost	1998	
Eric Hawkins	Shaun Hart	1983	
Gizzmo Hawkins	Robert T. Cullen	1982–1985, 1987	
Jessica Haynes	Jo-Anne Knowles	1984–1985	
Sally Haynes	Roberta Kerr	1984–1986, 1989	
Father Paul Heaton	Ronnie Leek	1994, 2000	
Sonia Heaton	Joan Blackham	1984	
Angela Heery	Paula Wilcox	1992	
Paul Heery	Graeme Edler	1994, 1996–1997	
Jamie Henderson	Sean McKee	1987–1988	
Matt Henderson	Jamie Lomas	2002	
Paula Heneghan	Jodie Draper	1991	
Roy Heneghan	David Rooney	1991	
Anthony Hesketh	Robert Schofield	1989–1990	
Tony Hetherington	Gordon Wharmby	1985	
Bernard Hilton	Keith Smith	2000	
Jessie Hilton	Marji Campi	1998–2002	
Kitty Hilton	Jean Heywood	2000–2001	
Ray Hilton	Kenneth Cope	1999–2002	
Angela Hobbs	Lizzie Mickery	1982	
Derek Hobbs	Norman Gregory	1982–1984	
Dr. John Holmes	Sam Dastor	1989	
Gerrard Holt	Tom Sharkey	1988–1989	
Joan Hope	Julie Neubert	1997	
Louise Hope	Lisa Faulkner	1997–1998	
Tom Hope	Kenneth Hadley	1997	
Andrew Hoskins	Granville Saxton	1983	
Pauline Hoskins	Eileen O'Brien	1983	
Jeff Howard	Bill Monks	1988–1989	
John Howard	Michael Lumsden	1999	
Nic Howard	James Sarsfield	2002–2003	
Paige Howard	Chelsea Farrell	2001–2002	
Paul Howard	Will Mellor	1992	
Simon Howe	Lee Hartney	1993–1994	
Norman Howells	Rod Arthur	1992	
Martin Howes	Andrew Hall	1988, 1990	
David Howman	Michael Roberts	1987	
Betty Hughes	Paula Tilbrook	1984–1985	
Mike Hughes	Dean Williams	1985	
John Hughes	Stephen Lloyd	1985	
Vauneen Hughes	Lynda Steadman	1989	
Brian "Bumper" Humphreys	James Mawdsley	1987–1991	
Betty Hunt	Marji Campi	1988–1989	
Lizzie Hunter	Holly Stock	2002–2003	
Margaret Huntington	Muriel Lawson	1983	
Roger Huntington	Rob Spendlove	1982–1983	
Sydney Huntington	Bert Gaunt	1983	
Dr. Tony Hurrell	Martin Wenner	1986	
Malcolm Hutchinson	James Taylor	1985	
Sarah Hutchinson	Nicolette McKenzie	1985	

== J ==
Character	Actor	Duration	Ref(s)
Gary Jackson	Allan Patterson	1983–1985	
George Jackson	Cliff Howells	1983–1984	
Little George Jackson	Steven Patterson	1983–1985	
Marie Jackson	Antonia Mallen	1983	
Marie Jackson	Anna Keaveney	1983–1985	
Simon Jackson	Edward Halsted	1988–1989	
DC Alan Jaundrill	Andrew Dunn	1990	
Helen Jefferson	Lisa Shaw	1985	
Margaret Jefferson	Barbara Marten	1985, 1987, 1989	
Matthew Jefferson	Richard Moriarty	1985	
Tony Jefferson	Richard Walker	1985, 1987	
Michelle Jenkins	Clare Coleman	1997	
Sylvia Johannsson	Shirley Dixon	2002	
Elaine Johnson	Beverly Hills	1996–1998	
Ellis Johnson	Francis Johnson	1991–1993	
Gemma Johnson	Naomi Kamanga	1990–1998	(Note: The role was reprised on Hollyoaks in 2025, recast with actress Tisha Merry.)
Gemma Johnson	Carla Jarrett	1998–2000	(Note: The role was reprised on Hollyoaks in 2025, recast with actress Tisha Merry.)
Jerome Johnson	Leon Lopez	1999–2002	
Leo Johnson	Leeon Sawyer	1990–1996	
Leo Johnson	Steven Cole	1996–2001	
Mick Johnson	Louis Emerick	1989–2001 (Note: Emerick began portraying Donny Clark on Hollyoaks in 2024; the character was revealed to be an alias of Mick Johnson in 2025.)	
Vonnie Johnson	Nicola Gardner	1999	
Vonnie Johnson	Suzette Llewellyn	2000–2001	
Trevor Johnston	Tim Barker	1983	
Alan Jones	Michael J. Jackson	1993	
Alun Jones	Norman Eshley	1986	
Barbara Jones	Jane Hollowood	1983	
Davey Jones	Ian Hendry	1984	
Elena Jones	Emma Rigby	2002–2003	
Gregory "Jonah" Jones	Tom Branch	1982–1983	
Jason Jones	Andrew Ukuesa	1983	
Michelle Jones	Tracey Jay	1983–1985	
Beth Jordache	Anna Friel	1993–1995	
Brenna Jordache	Gillian Hanna	1993, 1995	
Mandy Jordache	Sandra Maitland	1993–1995	
Trevor Jordache	Bryan Murray	1993	
Teddy Jordan	Peter Richey	1986	

== K ==
Character	Actor	Duration	Ref(s)
Francis Kavanagh	Nicholas Lamont	1989	
Jenny Kaye	Judy Holt	1983	
Howard Kelly	Andrew Moorcroft	1988	
Dr. Neil Kelly	Guy Parry	2001	
Brian Kennedy	Jonathan Caplan	1992–1993	
DI Steve Kent	Gary Whelan	1991–1993	
Eileen Kilby	Mary Cunningham	1995	
Bobby Kinsella	Anton Brookes	1982–1984	
Eleanor Kitson	Georgia Reece	1997–1998	

== L ==
Character	Actor	Duration	Ref(s)
Shane Ladd	Matthew Nutall	2002–2003	
Angela Lambert	Hilary Welles	1991–1992	
Colin Lambert	Mark Moraghan	1992	
Fiona Lambert	Laura Higgins	1992	
Fiona Lambert	Emma Beaman	1992	
Jenny Lambert	Rachael Higgins	1992	
Jenny Lambert	Stephanie Keely	1992	
Judith Lanigan	Claire Webzell	1999	
Jack Latimer	Mark Brignal	1987	
Brian Lawrence	Vincent Maguire	1988–1989	
Deborah Lawson	Debra Beaumont	1999–2000	
Ian Leigh	Mark Adams	1999	
Caroline Lewis	Louise Ironside	1994	
DC Eric Lloyd	Paul Humpoletz	1991	
Joan Lloyd	Jane Hogarth	2003	
Steven Lodge	Malcolm Hebden	1986	
Vicky Lomas	Louise Yates	1991	
Claire Lomax	Barbara Washington	1982	
Maureen Lomax	Val McLane	1983	

== M ==
Character	Actor	Duration	Ref(s)
Kevin MacDonald	Julian Kerridge	1996	
Barbara Mackay	Barbara Pierson	1989–1990	
Guy MacLeish	Christopher Villiers	1990	
Ian Maghie	Martin Muchan	1985	
Sandra Maghie	Sheila Grier	1984–1986	
Kenny Maguire	Tommy Boyle	1994–1995	
Cecile Malraux	Pia Henderson	1986	
Audrey Manners	Judith Barker	1994–1995	
George Manners	Brian Murphy	1995	
Molly Marchbank	Diane Keen	1997–1998	
James Markham	Tom Mannion	1989–1990	
Clive Marsland	Kenneth Hadley	1988–1990	
Avril Marshall	Kamilla Blanche	1986	
Jack Martell	Graeme Kirk	1983	
Jerry Martin	Philomena McDonagh	1986	
Sam Martin	John Harding	1994–1995	
Helen Massey	Colette Stevenson	1990–1991	
Deaken Mathews	Graham Callan	1985	
Alison Matthews	Jenny Beaver	1992–1993	
Gavin Matthews	Carl Rice	1992–1993	
Steve Matthews	Lawrence Mullin	1993	
Kim Maynard	Lisa Rogers	1990	
Greg McAdam	Nigel Caliburn	1984–1985	
Diane McAllistair	Rosy Clayton	1983	
Tommy McArdle	Malcolm Tierney	1984–1986	
Maggie McArdle	Peggy Shields	1986	
Don McAteer	Freddie Boardley	1994	
Jim McCabe	Ross Davidson	1991	
Jonathon McCabe	Alan Partington	1985	
Dennis McConnell	Gwynn Beech	1985	
Paula McCullough	Carolyn Knight	1998	
Carol McDermott	Sarah Neville	1991	
Dr. Terence McElhone	Jonathan Newth	1995	
Mo McGee	Tina Malone	1993–1998	
Paul McGinn	Duncan Gould	1986	
Hugh McGlynn	Jon Keats	2000	
Marie McGovern	Deanna Brown	1982–1984	
Maeve McGowan	Fenella Norman	1989	
Bridget McGrath	Annie Tyson	1988	
Debbie McGrath	Gillian Kearney	1986–1989	
Steve McGrath	Philip Howe	1998	
Tom McGrath	Nick Maloney	1987–1988	
Stan McHugh	Ian Bleasdale	1987	
Brigid McKenna	Meg Johnson	2000–2003	
Betty McLoughlin	Barbara Ashcroft	1992–1993	
Nick McLoughlin	Don Hall	1992	
Peter McMahon	Simon Oates	1989	
Mary McNab	Sally Treble	1997	
Steve McNab	Paul Chips	1997	
Susi McSharry	Helen Martin	1982–1983, 1985–1986	
Jack Michaelson	Paul Duckworth	2003	
Suzie Michaelson	Simone Barry	2003	
Lydia Miles	Liz Brailsford	1990	
Erica Miller	Jan Harvey	1984	
Gillian Miller	Jo Cameron Brown	2000	
Louise Mitchell	Jenny Hesketh	1989–1990	
Gary Mitchell	Gavin Stanley	1989	
Clint Moffat	Greg Pateras	2000–2001	
Robbie Moffat	Neil Davies	2000–2001	
Shirley Moffat	Esther Wilson	2001	
Kathleen Monaghan	Christine Moore	1986	
Peter Montague	Mark Draper	1986	
C.B. Moore	Eric Potts	1998–1999	
Franki Morgan	Linda Lusardi	1998	
Susan Morgan	Steph Bramwell	1990	
Ted Morgan	Gerry Forgarty	1988	
Dan Morrisey	Matthew Crompton	2002–2003	
Daphne Morrisey	Daphne Oxenford	2000	
Lisa Morrisey	Amanda Nolan	1998–1999	
Lisa Morrisey	Nina Marc	2000–2001	
Susannah Morrisey	Karen Drury	1991–1993, 1995–2000	
Claire Morton	Sorcha Cusack	1992	
Debbie Moses	Natasha Williams	1985	
Kate Moses	Sharon Rosita	1984–1985	
Tony Moses	Hepburn Graham	1985	
Lindsay Mulholland	Eithne Brown	1986	
Father John Munroe	Peter Blake	1993	
Darren Murphy	Matthew Crompton	1992	
Les Murphy	Tom Williamson	1992	
Adele Murray	Katy Lamont	2000–2003	
Alec Murray	John Langford	1985	
Anthony Murray	Ray Quinn	2000–2003	
Christy Murray	Glyn Pritchard	2000–2003	
Diane Murray	Bernie Nolan	2000–2002	
Jan Murray	Helen Sheals	2002–2003	
Marty Murray	Neil Caple	2000–2003	
Steve Murray	Steven Fletcher	2000–2003	
Joey Musgrove	Dan Mullane	1998–2000	
Kelly Musgrove	Natalie Earl	1998–2000	
Luke Musgrove	Jason Kavanagh	1998–2000	
Matt Musgrove	Kristian Ealey	1998–2000 (Note: Ealey also portrayed Matt on Hollyoaks between 2000 and 2004.)	
Niamh Musgrove	Barbara Drennan	1998–2000	
Ryan Musgrove	Samuel Hudson	1998–2000	
Chris Myers	Marie Francis	1994	
Linda Myers	Susan Dempsey	1984	

== N ==
Character	Actor	Duration	Ref(s)
Barbara Newton	Polly Highton	2000	
Bernard Nichols	Will Tacey	1985	
Diane Nichols	Linda Armstrong	1999	
Matty Nolan	Tony Scoggo	1982–1992	
Stephen Nolan	Ian Puleston-Davies	1986	
Teresa Nolan	Ann Haydn-Edwards	1982–1986	

== O ==
Character	Actor	Duration	Ref(s)
Alec O'Brien	Al T. Kossy	1998–2000	
Richard O'Connor	Chris Sanders	1984–1985	
Father Derek O'Farrell	Clive Moore	1990–1994	
Tommy O'Grady	Raymond Livingston	1990–1991	
Ben O'Leary	Simon Paul	1997–1998	
Carmel O'Leary	Carol Connor	1996–1998, 2000	
Emily O'Leary	Jennifer Ellison	1998–2003	
Melanie O'Leary	Elizabeth Lovelady	1997–1998	
Tim O'Leary	Philip Olivier	1996–2003 (Note: Olivier made a crossover appearance as Tim on Hollyoaks in 2025.)	
Dr. Joseph O'Rourke	Christian Rodska	1990	
Jackie O'Shaughnessy	Jill Dawn	1985–1986	
Tom Osbourne	Michael Strobel	1988	

== P ==
Character	Actor	Duration	Ref(s)
Brian Palmer	Noel Coleman	1984–1986	
Imogen Parker	Helen Warburton	1989	
Andrea Parkin	Jane Morant	1986	
Bernie Parkin	John Judd	1986	
Arthur Parkinson	Edward Clayton	1987–1989	
Lloyd Palmer	Gerald Hunter	2001	
Dil Parmer	Gordon Warnecke	1995	
Gabby Parr	Stephanie Chambers	2002–2003	
Gary Parr	Ben Hull	2002–2003	
Dilys Parry	Jenny Funnell	1985	
Alan Partridge	Dicken Ashworth	1983–1984	
Molly Partridge	Hilda Braid	1984	
Samantha Partridge	Dinah May	1983–1984	
Doreen Payne	Stella Tanner	1984	
James Payne	Colin Kerrigan	1995–1996	
Ken Payne	Peter Geddis	1984	
Fran Pearson	Bernadette Foley	1987	
Fran Pearson	Julie Peasgood	1991–1993	
Wally Peek	Carl Chase	1983	
Colin Peterson	Bob Hewis	1985	
Fee Phelan	Jackie Downey	1996	
Peter Phelan	Samuel Kane	1995–1999	
Joseph Philbin	Stephen Ravenscroft	2003	
Gina Philips	Jill Brassington	1991	
John Philips	Geoffrey Hall	1991	
Nigel Philips	Anthony Milner	1991	
PC Kevin Phillips	Russell Boulter	1989	
Meg Pierce	Anne Rutter	1988	
Carol Pilkington	Cathy Nicholson	1983	
Emma Piper	Paula Bell	1994–1995	
Ray Piper	Duggie Brown	1994	
Jill Plummer	Carolyn Pickles	2001–2002	
Malcolm Pollock	John Golightly	1985	
Reg Pope	Ted Morris	1988	
Cheryl Potter	Antonia Mallen	1985	
PC Mark Potter	Paul Crosby	1991	
Jimmy Powell	Alan Turton	1985	
Lance Powell	Mickey Poppins	2000–2003	
Leanne Powell	Vickie Gates	1992–1993, 1997, 2000–2003	
Ted Powell	Michael Atkinson	1993	
Billy Preece	Barry McCarthy	1986	
Colin Prendergast	Norman Mills	1998	
Joseph Pride	Charles Haggith	1984	
Sarah Pride	Mae Stelfox	1984	
Joe Pritchard	Richard Davies	1985	

== Q ==
Character	Actor	Duration
John Quincey	Anthony Smee	1984
David Quinn	David Neal	1985

== R ==
Character	Actor	Duration	Ref(s)
Peter Randall	Nigel Nevinson	1985	
Jeff Rawlings	Paul Green	1982	
Alec Redfearn	James Garbutt	1988	
Derek Reece	Dick Brannick	1989	
WPC Emma Reid	Tricia Penrose	1988–1989	
Mary Reid	Carolyn Jordan	1997–1998	
Simon Reynolds	Gary Carp	1983	
Janice Richardson	Jeanette Dobson	1987	
Madge Richmond	Shirley Stelfox	1986–1987	
Liam Riley	Adam Sunderland	1990	
Shelley Rimmer	Lesley Nicol	1986–1987	
Keith Riordan	Paul Kelly	1987	
Franco Riozzi	Vincenzo Nicoli	1988	
Penny Riozzi	Lynda Rooke	1988	
Archie Rivers	Phil McCall	1985	
Toby Rivers	Christopher Hollis	1999	
Kathy Roach	Noreen Kershaw	1988–1990	
Sean Roach	Derek Hicks	1989–1990	
Adrian Roache	John Basham	1993–1995	
Camilla Roberts	Dawn Brady	1985	
Derek Roberts	Christopher Gray	1985	
John Roberts	Jack McKenzie	1989	
Kenny Roberts	Roger Martin	1991	
Lenny Roberts	Stephen McKenna	1989–1990	
Susan Robinson	Sheila Ferguson	1991	
Andrea Robson	Juanne Fuller	1998	
Pauline Robson	Kim Taylforth	1998	
Carolyn Roebuck	Lucinda Curtis	2000	
Darren Roebuck	Timothy Deenihan	1999–2001	
Chrissy Rogers	Eithne Browne	1987–1991, 1993	
Frank Rogers	Peter Christian	1987–1993	
Geoff Rogers	Kevin Carson	1987–1991	
Geoff Rogers	Stephen Walters	1993	
Katie Rogers	Debbie Reynolds	1987–1989	
Katie Rogers	Diane Burke	1989–2003	
Lyn Rogers	Sharon Power	1992–1994	
Sammy Rogers	Rachael Lindsay	1987–1993, 1996, 2001–2003	
Sophie Rogers	Robert and Thomas McGowan	2003	
Dick Ronson	Bill Cookson	1997	
Keith Rooney	Kirk Smith	1991–1993	

== S ==
Character	Actor	Duration	Ref(s)
Carol Salter	Angela Walsh	1993–1994	
Eileen Salter	Judith Barker	1983–1984	
Garry Salter	Stephen Dwyer	1993–1995	
Greg Salter	Paul Barber	1994	
Sampikos Sarikas	Chris Constantinou	1990	
Scott Saunders	Ryan Hurst	2000	
Georgina Savage	Hannah Waddingham	2002	
Ian Savage	Michael Brogan	2002	
Tommy Scanlon	Peter Lynch	1988	
Alan Scott	Edmund Kente	1998–1999	
Victor Scott	Robbie Dee	1982–1985	
Rick Sexton	Jeffrey Longmore	1984–1985	
Greg Shadwick	Mark Moraghan	1998–1999	
Jason Shadwick	Vincent Price	1998–1999	
Margi Shadwick	Bernadette Foley	1998–2000, 2002–2003	
Nikki Shadwick	Suzanne Collins	1998–2003 (Note: Collins made a crossover appearance as Nikki on Hollyoaks in 2025.)	
Tina Shaw	Suzanne Cleary	1991	
DS Eamon Sheridan	Ian Mercer	1994	
Des Short	Shaun Williamson	1992–1993	
Bel Simpson	Lesley Nightingale	1996–1998	
Danny Simpson	Andrew Butler	1996–1998	
Dave Simpson	Roger Phillips	1983	
Georgia Simpson	Helen Grace	1996–1997	
Jules Simpson	Sarah Withe	1996	
Nat Simpson	John Sandford	1996–1997	
Ollie Simpson	Michael J. Jackson	1996–1998	
Greg Sinnott	Neil Fitzmaurice	1990–1991	
Eugene Skelly	Mark Aspinall	1983–1984	
Tony Skipper	Kev Seed	2001	
Viv Slater	Hilary Drake	1990	
Ena Smart	Finola Keogh	1989	
Cheryl Smith	Sherrill Parsons	2000–2001	
Jane Smith	Claire Lewis	1985–1986	
Jed Smith	David Cole	1991	
Luke Smith	Callum Giblin	2002–2003	
Mark Smith	John Michie	1996	
Rebecca Smith	Mia Soteriou	1987–1988	
Ruth Smith	Lynsey McCaffrey	2002–2003	
Sean Smith	Barry Sloane	2002–2003	
Marcus Sneddon	Matthew Brenher	1998	
Dolly Sparrow	Valerie Griffiths	1990	
Faye Spence	Joanne Zorian	1998	
Freddie Spence	Peter Corey	1991–1993	
Warren Spence	Richard Albrecht	1996, 1998	
Linda Spencer	Francesca Ryan	1990	
Gary Stanlow	Daniel McNamara	1991	
Gary Stanlow	Andrew Fillis	1995–1996, 1998	
Coral Stephens	Sharon Byatt	1989–1990	
Laura Stevens	Elizabeth Avis	2002–2003	
Mike Stevens	Saul Jephcott	1987	
Norman Stone	Ian Hastings	1985	
Noel Stones	Adam Levy	1996	
Daniel Sullivan	Keiran Poole	1989–1991	
Jack Sullivan	William Maxwell	1984–1987, 1989–1991, 1996–1997	
Sue Sullivan	Annie Miles	1987–1991	
Terry Sullivan	Brian Regan	1982–1997	
Don Summerhill	Jonathan Barlow	1985	
Ruth Sweeney	Mary Healey	1992, 1994	
Ruth Sweeney Jr.	Rhiannon Wright	1995–1999	
Thomas "Sinbad" Sweeney	Michael Starke	1984–1985, 1987–2000 (Note: Starke also made several appearances as Sinbad on Hollyoaks between 2021 and 2025.)	
Arthur Sweeting	Martin Oldfield	1984	
Jenny Swift	Kate Beckett	1995	
John Swift	John Line	1995	
Keith Swift	Raymond Sawyer	1989	

== T ==
Character	Actor	Duration	Ref(s)
Michelle Tan	Stacy Liu	2000–2001	
Dorothy Tate	Mary Cunningham	1983–1984	
Nigel Tate	Denis Lill	1995	
Robin Tate	Richard Tate	1983–1984	
Gavin Taylor	Danny Webb	1982–1983	
Melanie Taylor	Fionnuala Ellwood	1997	
Petra Taylor	Alexandra Pigg	1982–1983	
Keith Tench	Anthony Smee	1986	
Carol Thompson	Geraldine Griffiths	1985–1986	
Celia Thompson	Annette Ekblom	1984–1985	
Dick Thornton	Graham Seed	1995–1999	
Father Thornton	James Garbutt	1991–1992	
Rose Thurley	Penelope Fischer	1984	
Will Thurley	Derek Thompson	1983–1984	
Neil "Tommo" Tomlinson	John O'Gorman	1986–1992	
Alan Torenson	David Williams	1982–1983	
June Torenson	Dinah Handley	1983	
Sarah Townes	Julianne White	1988–1990	
Herbert Travis	Geoffrey Wilkinson	1984	
Eleanor Trench	Anna Welsh	1995	
Colin Trent	Tony Karol	1984	
Carl Trevor	Mark Moraghan	1989	
Rob Trevor	Seamus O'Neill	1989	
Dr. Ian Tripp	Philip McGough	2003	
Tanya Tunford	Louise van de Buors	2000	
Janice Tuomey	Diane Whitley	1983	
Jack Turner	Tony Newbury	1982–1983	
Vera Turner	Gladys Ambrose	1982–1983	

== V ==
Character	Actor	Duration
Frank Vernon	Angus Kennedy	1985

== W ==
Character	Actor	Duration	Ref(s)
Hilary Wainwright	Maytelok Gibbs	1997	
Angela Walker	Sandra Coxe	1998	
Cathy Walker	Katy Newell	1984	
Val Walker	Pauline Fleming	1996	
Maurice Walsh	George Malpas	1989	
Christine Walton	Annie Fitzmaurice	2000–2001	
Jim Ward	Jon Keats	2003	
Mo Ward	Angela Walsh	2003	
Donald Waterson	Bryan Reynolds	1990	
Gary Watson	Paul Kelly	1983	
Ken Watson	Chris Johnstone	1984	
Richard Watts	Bogdan Kominowski	1990–1991	
Stephen Wax	Billy Clarke	1985	
George Webb	Kenneth MacDonald	1992	
Charles Weekes	Tony Armatrading	1993	
Michael Wells	Michael Gunn	1988	
Nigel Westbrook	Malcolm Stoddard	2001	
Gillian Westwood	Margo Gunn	1996	
Louise Whelan	Amanda Whitehead	1999–2000	
Nikki White	Michelle Byatt	1988–1992	
Mark Wilcox	Dugald Bruce Lockhart	1999–2000	
Victoria Wilcox	Patricia Potter	1999–2001	
Rob Wilde	Miles Moss	2000	
Bert Williams	Syd Newman	1982	
Di Williams	Meryl Hampton	1989	
George Williams	Doc O'Brien	1982–1988	
Ronnie Williams	Claire Robinson	1988–1991	
Roy Williams	Adam Kotz	1994	
Guy Willis	Ian Michie	1985–1986	
Helen Wills	Vivien Heilbron	1992	
Neil Wilson	Francis Ivediebo	1985–1987	
Monica Winterton	Kate Rutter	1989	
Anna Wolska	Kazia Pelka	1992–1993	
Danny Wood	Lorne Walker	1988	
Martin Wood	Jamie Summers	2002	
Joey Woods	Chris Darwin	1994	
Bunty Wright	Julie Mullen	1997	
Christian Wright	Philip Dowd	1995, 1997	
Dorothy Wright	Jacqueline Morgan	1987–1988	
Geoff Wright	Arthur Kelly	1987–1988	
Joanne Wright	Carleen Lundon	1987	

== Y ==
Character	Actor	Duration
Amy Ying	Choy-Ling Man	1989, 1999

== See also ==
- List of Hollyoaks characters introduced in 2025
