= Katie Rogers =

Fictional character from Brookside

- Brookside character
- Diane Burke as Katie Rogers
- Portrayed by: Debbie Reynolds (1987–1989); Diane Burke (1989–2003)
- Duration: 1987–2003
- First appearance: 7 December 1987
- Last appearance: 30 September 2003
- Created by: Phil Redmond
In-universe information
- Occupation: Student; Receptionist
- Father: Frank Rogers
- Mother: Chrissy Rogers
- Stepmother: Lyn Rogers
- Brothers: Geoff Rogers
- Sisters: Sammy Rogers
- Daughters: Sophie Rogers
- Grandfathers: Jeffrey Rogers; Ted Morgan
- Aunts: Pat
- Nieces: Louise Daniels

Katie Rogers is a fictional character from the British Channel 4 soap opera Brookside, played by Debbie Reynolds and Diane Burke. The character debuted on-screen during the episode broadcast on 7 December 1987. Reynolds played the character until 1989 when Diane Burke took over the role and remained until 2003 when Brookside was cancelled. Katie was introduced as part of the Rogers family consisting of parents Frank (Peter Christian) and Chrissy Rogers (Eithne Brown) and their three children Katie, Sammy (Rachael Lindsay) and Geoff Rogers (Kevin Carson).

Katie is characterised as unlucky in love and prone to drama. Writers consistently used her to portray grief and her descent into alcoholism and eating disorders. In her early years she was an intelligent student who becomes the victim of bullying by Bagga (Tina Fairclough). Katie was centric to a controversial religious cult storyline, in which Simon Howe (Lee Hartney) manipulates her into the cult and convinces her to have sex with him. Other storylines included developing toxaemia and her long-term friendship with Jacqui Dixon (Alex Fletcher). In her later years, writers paired Katie with Clint Moffat (Greg Pateras). Katie's bad luck continued as Clint was shot dead by Ron Dixon (Vince Earl) during a robbery. Writers created a long-term grief story for Katie, which sees her contemplate suicide, become alcohol dependant and alienate her friends and family against her.

== Casting ==
Katie was first portrayed by Debbie Reynolds who was cast in 1987. The role was later recast with Diane Burke taking over the role from December 1988. Burke was aged twelve when she took over the role. Casting directors for the show visited her school to scout for actors. Recalling her casting, Burke stated that "I enjoyed it [acting] so much that my drama teacher encouraged me to pursue an acting career and I found myself being invited to audition for Brookside."

== Development ==
=== Characterisation ===
In her early years, Katie was characterised as "a very intense girl" who could never be described as "happy-go-lucky". Writers never gave Katie much to laugh about. Katie was originally portrayed as a popular student but school bullies eventually wear her down. In the book Brookside The First Ten Years, Geoff Tibbals wrote that Katie is intelligent and "cares more about the state of the world than her bedroom."

Producers gave Katie numerous dramatic storylines throughout her tenure. Burke told Merle Brown from the Daily Record that "she's been through it all, Katie, hasn't she? Parents dying, being brainwashed by a cult leader, having bulimia as a teenager, her fiancé being shot by her best friend's dad. It's been tough." The character was often portrayed as a heavy alcohol drinker and Burke claimed she had become an "expert at crying" because of Katie's endless dramas. In another interview, Burke stated that Katie had a "traumatic" life. A writer from Brookside official website stated that Katie "seemed doomed to be unlucky-in-love". Writers used Katie to portray the eating disorder bulimia. Burke branded the storyline "very challenging and a big responsibility to play." Writers continued to portray Katie down on her luck throughout her entire duration. In 2002, Burke told Steve Hendry from Sunday Mail that "I know Katie's never going to be happy. She's just the sort who invites trouble, isn't she?

=== Teenage Years ===
Katie was originally portrayed as one of the show's students at the local high school. Katie was popular and this caught the attention of the school bully Bagga (Tina Fairclough). She begins to harass Katie and forces her to steal money. Katie's siblings Sammy (Rachael Lindsay) and Geoff Rogers (Kevin Carson) and their friend Bumper Humphries (James Mawdsley) decide to intervene and ambush Bagga when she enters Brookside Close.

After her bullying ordeal, writers featured Katie developing a crush on her science teacher Mr Molineux. Katie is desperate to impress him and decides to clean up the local river. She enlists the help of her friend Siobhan (Joanne Birchall) but when they begin cleaning, Katie falls into the polluted water. She is rushed to hospital where they she is diagnosed with a form of toxaemia. When producers decided to break-up the marriage of Frank (Peter Christian) and Chrissy Rogers (Eithne Brown), writers used the opportunity to impact Katie the most. Tibballs described it as "Katie's greatest heartache". On-screen Katie desperately wants her parents to remain together and she could not believe that her mother would leave her. Katie did not understand why they separate despite the Rogers' constant arguing. The decision to axe the character of Chrissy was made by Brookside's executive producer Mal Young. He was unhappy with the Rogers family dynamic and thought their stories were "going round in circles". Young told Browne that she needed to leave to save the Rogers family from being axed entirely the following year. Young's research for the show found that there was an increasing number of families with children splitting up in the United Kingdom. He concluded that he wanted to reflect this scenario with the Rogers family. Writers then introduced Leanne Powell (Vickie Gates) as Katie's new friend. She begins to be a bad influence on Katie and used her to get close to Owen Daniels (Danny McCall) in her plan to seduce him. In the book Brookside The Early Years, Burke told author Tibballs that she "thoroughly enjoyed" playing Katie through her teenage years. She added "despite everything she's been through, she's emerged as a kind, sensible girl. She could certain teach Jacqui Dixon a thing or two about manners."

=== Simon Howe ===
One of Katie's controversial storylines began in 1994. Katie is grieving the death of her father, Frank and which attracts the attention of Simon Howe (Lee Hartney). He is a cult leader of a born again Christian movement that move into Brookside Close. He begins to manipulate Katie and she moves in with him. Hartney told a reporter from Inside Soap that "he's trying to convert Katie to his cult [...] he enjoys manipulating people and loves the power." Katie's best friend Jacqui Dixon (Alex Fletcher) becomes suspicious of the situation. Hartney added that Jacqui is "just trying to catch him out". Katie continues to be manipulated by Simon. Burke told Josephine Munroe from Inside Soap that she often laughed when she received her scripts. Burke could not believe that Katie agrees with Simon's preaching. It made her doubt whether viewers would believe what they were watching. Cult stories were topical at the time as they were featured heavily in the news. This made it easier for Burke to accept.

Simon manages to get Katie to have sex with him without using a condom. He tells her that God will protect them. Burke stated that Simon is "so full of crap" but writers chose the correct character for the story. She believed this because Katie is "the most naive person I know. She's so childlike and she believes anything anyone tells her." The show's cast would often talk about Simon's antics. They were unsure whether Simon was actually religious or just enjoys manipulating people. With Jacqui's involvement, writers offered viewers hope that Katie would escape Simon. Burke concluded that "it's all getting really dramatic and really exciting."

=== Grieving Clint and Grudge with the Dixons ===
Producers created a long-running grief storyline for the character following the death of her boyfriend Clint Moffat (Greg Pateras). Clint is accidentally shot dead by Ron Dixon (Vince Earl) during a robbery. Burke described it as a challenge because she had to "portray a great range of emotions". Burke researched the grief story by talking to people about death and used her own experiences. She also used a tear stick to help her cry during the filming of Katie's scenes. Burke believed that Katie had finally happiness with Clint "but sadly it was taken away from her". She added that she wanted Katie's luck to improve in the future. Sammy decides to help Katie get revenge for Clint's murder. Sammy agrees to help destroy Jacqui's marriage to Max Farnham (Steven Pinder) by seducing him. Katie's grief continues to consume her and she alienates those closest to her such as Jacqui and Sammy. After she contemplates suicide, Katie decides to try and move on. Burke told the Sunday Mail's Hendry that "Katie's had a bit of a mad time recently. She's trying to pick herself up again and I have to say it's great to have more to do than being drunk and crying again."

=== End of Series ===
When Brookside ceased production, Burke had appeared in 841 episodes of Brookside . Prior to the show's cancellation, Burke stated that she "really loved" playing Katie and envisaged her remaining in Brookside Close raising a family of her own. She added "I wouldn't know what to do if she was axed. I've been here all my life it seems." In 1995, Katie was featured in show's companion VHS video release titled Brookside - The Teenagers.

== Storylines ==
After her father, Frank, died in a car crash in November 1993, she became vulnerable and easy to fool for cult leader Simon. Initially, she was the only resident living on Brookside Close caught up in the cult, until Terry Sullivan (Brian Regan) joined. Katie was a long-time friend of Jacqui, however, the two fell out in 2001 when Jacqui's father Ron accidentally shot dead Katie's boyfriend Clint who was at the Dixon's trying to reason with Robbie who was burgling the house.

== Reception ==
Analysing Katie's bad luck, the Daily Record's Brown opined that "she's one of Brookie's longest serving residents, and has lived through a roller coaster life as luckless Katie Rogers." She added that Katie had frequently "been through the mill" but eventually she "regained her sanity and stabilised her life." Brown later criticised Katie and praised her sacking from the medical centre. She added one reason for her sacking was that "she walks about with a face on her that would make you think she's been sucking lemons for a week." In another review Brown stated that Katie quickly recovered from her grief; then she "goes hunting for men. Any men it would seem. Go girl." Brown predicted that it would end with Katie in tears. Steve Hendry (Sunday Mail) stated that Burke was completely different from her "miserable character". He added that she "has a great big smile she doesn't get to use very often on Brookie."

Gareth McLean from The Guardian opined that Katie's bulimia and cult stories "paled in comparison" to her self-loathing and alcoholism over Clint's death. He stated "to say things have never been great for Katie is like saying Marlon Brando is just slightly vague. But lately things have been tough, even by Katie's exacting standards." He added that the character was "wracked with self-loathing" and "overwhelmed with a desire to consume bottles of cheap vodka." In another review McLean stated that Katie's involvement in the cult storyline as an example of Brookside failing to portray everyday life scenarios. He later said that he would bet money on Katie being the character "next to snap" and go on a murder spree. Their colleague Tina Ogle wrote that it was "no wonder Katie developed an eating disorder" because she "slobs around, depressed and out of work." Jim Shelley criticised Katie's hairstyle, joking that it was inspired by "Adolf Hitler joining The Human League". Inside Soap's Helen Childs praised Burke's portrayal of bulimia. She wrote "we agree that Diane certainly does deserve some sort of recognition for her recent acting performance. It must be exhausting playing a character like Katie, but Diane seems to take it in her stride." Inside Soap ran a feature compiling "The 100 greatest soap stories ever told". They featured Katie and Simon's cult story as their 64th choice.
