= Simon Howe =

Fictional character from Brookside

- Brookside character
- Portrayed by: Lee Hartney
- Duration: 1993–1994
- First appearance: 22 October 1993
- Last appearance: 28 October 1994
In-universe information
- Occupation: Shop assistant
- Father: Reverend Howe

Simon Howe is a fictional character from the British Channel 4 soap opera Brookside, played by Lee Hartney. The character debuted on-screen during the episode broadcast on 22 October 1993. Hartney received the role the day after he had auditioned for it. Simon is introduced as a new petrol pump attendant working in the local petrol station. Writers first portrayed him as being mild-mannered before revealing his true manipulative persona.

Simon is characterised as a maniacal cult leader who tries to convert people into following his religion. Writers used the character to manipulate Katie Rogers (Diane Burke) and Terry Sullivan (Brian Regan) into joining his cult. He also takes Barry Grant (Paul Usher) with a gun and intentionally causes an explosion in his home. Critics of the genre branded the cult storyline controversial and unrealistic. Gareth McLean writing for The Guardian branded the character "the least charismatic charismatic ever". Other journalists compared Simon's story to the real life case of David Koresh and the Waco siege. Hartney praised the show's scriptwriters for portraying an issue-led storyline that happens in reality. Hartney received a mixed reaction from the public which ranged from hate mail and verbal abuse to fans requesting to join Simon's cult. The character was written out the following year in a suicide storyline, making his final appearance on 28 October 1994.

== Casting ==
Hartney was cast in the role of Simon in 1993. Hartney was filming scenes for the television series Cracker when he learned about the role. After he left the Granada studios early, he attended an audition. The following day Hartney was offered the role, which was also the day he received his A level exam results. Hartney said Susan Wallace from the Sandwell Evening News that "I thought it seemed really poignant, really ironic - as though I was supposed to be acting and not studying." Hartney was signed to a recurring cast contract which was reviewed and renewed sporadically every few months.

== Development ==
=== Characterisation and cult introduction ===
Producers introduced the character as a leader of a religious cult. Simon believes that he is "God's Chosen One" and he moves into number 5 Brookside Close. Hartney told an Inside Soap reporter that when Simon was introduced he only seemed to work at the petrol station and pray; Simon "never talked about doing anything else". When Hartney joined the show he was unaware of the full extent of Simon's cult storyline. Hartney told Sam Taylor from The Observer that he initially thought Simon seemed like "a drip". Producers informed him that there was "something a bit more beneath the surface" of the character. On-screenwriters made Simon appear "mild-mannered" but he soon showed his true agenda. With every script, Hartney witnessed the evolution of Simon from nice guy to a nasty character. Hartney told Stephanie Bell from Sunday Life that "at first there was nothing to suggest a sinister side to Simon, I saw him as Mr Nice Guy, a bit of a drip, a boring boy with nothing dynamic about his personality." Hartley recalled the sudden realisation that his character was hiding a talent for manipulation. Hartney likened Simon to a predator, adding he had "a façade of being ordinary to ward off suspicion while he hooked his prey." Once Simon "hooked" them the new recruits "believed anything". Hartney soon found it easy getting into character, explaining "as soon as I put on his awful check shirts and his disgusting baggy jeans... I just become Simon."

Hartney told Richard Arnold (Inside Soap) that Simon is an "absolute control freak", a "megalomaniac" who "loves power" and wants others to "look up to him and respect his beliefs." Simon surrounds himself with people of a similar age. This is another manipulative trait as he knows that his followers will better relate to him. Simon is "maniacal" and this causes him to behave erratically. Hartley told Tony Purnell from the Daily Mirror that He's sly, unprincipled and he thrives on total power." The story was created by Brookside's producer Mal Young who based the story on real life cults. He told Jill Todd from TVTimes that "we wanted to see how religion could affect a vulnerable person." Writers developed the cult storyline over six months worth of episodes. Simon's manipulative conduct included forcing his followers to practise behaviours that he would not practise himself. Hartney told David Whetstone from The Journal that Simon forbids his followers from watching television but continues to do so himself. He asks cult members to fast but Simon continues to consumer food. Hartney explained that Simon justifies his behaviour buy claiming that "he needs his strength and Stamina to look after the group and keep the devil at bay."

Simon's stories were similar to the real life events of American cult leader David Koresh and the Waco siege. Hartney has likened Simon to Koresh because of his manipulative characterisation. Hartney has claimed that he did not know what a cult was prior to taking on the role. He was also unfamiliar with Koresh and his activities because he did not follow the news. The story made Hartney realise how vulnerable teenagers were being fooled into joining cults. Hartney's portrayal was so convincing that he began to receive verbal abuse in public and was sent hate mail. Though some fascinated viewers contacted Hartney asking to join Simon's cult. Hartney was to deterred by the reaction and defended scriptwriters for portraying the issue lead story.

=== Manipulating Katie and Terry ===
"We're showing that while such extraordinary self-confidence can be used as a positive talent, it can become a power for very real evil."

— Hartley on Simon's manipulation of Katie and Terry. (1994)

Simon soon manipulates Katie Rogers (Diane Burke) and she agrees to move in with him. He then recruits Terry Sullivan (Brian Regan) and he moves in with them. As the story progressed it became clear that praying was only a small part of Simon's religious rituals. He always appears with around six other people who hang onto his every word. The basis of Simon's cult is the born again Christian movement but he chooses to leave his sect unnamed. Hartney explained that Simon wants to convert Katie into his cult. Simon "enjoys manipulating people and loves the power. He really likes people listening to him." Simon finds it easier to manipulate Katie because she is still grieving the death of her father. Katie's best friend, Jacqui Dixon (Alex Fletcher) becomes the only one capable of saving her. Hartney added that Jacqui is "trying to catch Simon out."

Burke told Josephine Monroe from Inside Soap that writers chose the correct character in for Simon to target. She explained that Katie is "the most naïve person I know. She's so childlike and believes anything anyone tells her." Burke was concerned that viewers would not think the story was realistic. Burke herself could not believe some of the things Katie was agreeing to do for Simon; but cults were more frequently reported on in news and she thought that added realism. Burke was unsure if Simon really believed in God or if he "just gets a buzz out of manipulating other people." She enjoyed portraying the issue and often looked forward to receiving advance scripts, which she branded "dramatic and exciting". Burke concluded that she was unsure of what would happen to Katie if Jacqui could not save her from the cult.

One of the most outrageous aspects of the story was Simon trying to manipulate Katie and Terry into having sex. Simon views Terry differently to other members of the cult. He does not think Terry is as in need of help but likes the challenge of converting him. Hartley told Bell that "He sees Terry as a new challenge, a guy so unlikely to get caught up in a religious sect that he must set out to hook him." Simon views Katie as "a means to other ends". His manipulation of Katie is a well practised scheme. Hartney explained that Simon had previously manipulated a girl named Caroline and she serves as an example of what Katie will become. Caroline had stayed with the cult despite "appalling treatment" and now Katie is being treated similarly as Simon attempts to force her into having sex with Terry. Hartney concluded that Simon is so confident in his manipulation that he is unafraid of losing Katie and "confident she'll stay even if she rebels a little just now." Outraged by Simon's sex demands, Katie breaks free and seeks refuge with the Dixon family. Terry decides to remain with Simon.

=== Departure ===
Barry Grant (Paul Usher) is introduced into the story as a new enemy of the cult. He buys number 5 and tries to evict the cult members, but they do not leave. He then tries to scare them with a gun, which Simon and Terry then use to hold Barry hostage. Hartney told Arnold that the climax to the cult story is "great stuff". Simon is completely "maniacal and he could go over the edge at any time." Barry wants revenge on Simon because he told everyone that Barry was a murderer. Simon is convinced that Barry is the devil and must deal with him. Hartney described Barry as "a nasty piece of work" but "no match for Simon". Barry is also a threat to Simon because he "knows his own kind" and could potentially out Simon as a con man. Hartney believed that his character genuinely wanted to protect his "flock" and sees Barry as a bad influence on Terry. Simon thinks he is "protecting Terry to a certain extent, and he believes there's a legitimate reason for what he does."

They later decide to make a bomb which detonates and causes damage to the house. The explosion was a "spectacular" stunt which created by the production team. A writer from the show's official website stated "the Brookside production team decided it needed to be on a grand scale." It was achieved by placing two air cannons in each of the bedroom windows. Sugar glass was fitted into the wooden window frames for the shattering effect. Smoke machines were deployed and stacks of paper were placed in front of the cannons. When the stunt was filmed, the cannons had so much force that the roof of the house did visibly rise. Hartney praised the story for being a "typical" Brookside plot that had been "done very well and very gradually". Hartney later reflected that he had received a "strange reaction" from viewers about Simon, adding that one viewer wrote to him offering Simon a place to live.

== Storylines ==
Howe preyed on people who had personal tragedy. Katie had experienced personal tragedy through the death of her father Frank (Peter Christian) in a car crash in November 1993. Simon indoctrinated her into his cult and took her virginity as initiation into the group. Despite his initial reluctance, Terry soon proved easy prey for Simon after the death of his wife Sue (Annie Miles) and son Danny. In indoctrinating Terry, Simon however invokes the wrath of Terry's friend Barry. With Barry already disliking Simon for brain-washing his best friend Terry, Simon further antagonises Barry by handing out leaflets warning of the 'perils of drink' outside Barry's bar. Barry threatens Simon, leaving Simon deciding to get him back. When the lease on No.5 expires Simon decides he wants to buy it to use it as his church. Barry however buys back his old house before Simon can and begins eviction proceedings.

Deciding that if he couldn't have his house then nobody could, Simon decided to blow it up. When Barry breaks in trying to evict Simon, Simon captures him and ties him up. He then makes a homemade bomb, releasing Barry just before setting the bomb. The bomb explodes, however it only causes superficial damage. Barry escapes; however, Simon and Terry are standing too near to the house and are injured. Barry visits Terry, who, to Barry's surprise, stays loyal to Simon. After recovering, Simon tells Terry that their work is done and it is time to die. The two try to asphyxiate themselves with exhaust fumes in a car. Barry finds them and rescues Terry only, leaving Simon to die.

== Reception ==
Tony Purnell from the Daily Mirror assessed that "Simon Howe's cherubic smile, curly hair and bright eyes make him every mother's ideal. A bit of a drip in other words. But lurking beneath that angelic exterior there's a devil." Another journalist from the outlet was not fooled by Simon's bravado. They wrote that "Simon is so obvious that he wouldn't earn a penny as a second-hand car salesman, but he's fooling people on the Close." They added that Simon was clever in his deceit because he "prefers to stay out of the way when trouble threatens." Gareth McLean writing for The Guardian stated that Simon's cult storyline was an example of Brookside failing to portray everyday life scenarios. He also branded the character "the least charismatic charismatic ever, intent on spreading his version of the word." Another Guardian journalist branded him the "Koresh-style cultist 'Creepy' Simon Howe." Mike Wallbank from the Tameside Reporter described Simon as "the leader of a bizarre religious cult who preyed on the bereaved and vulnerable." Katy Brent from Closer said that Simon's cult story was a reason to still miss Brookside after it was cancelled. She added that "when Simon eventually gassed himself in a car it was really hard to feel sad."

Jill Todd from TVTimes profiled the character stating "religious leader Simon in Brookside is power-crazed, deeply sinister and dangerous - and his recruits worship him. It's fiction, but it's based on real life." The Observer's Taylor described Simon as an "evil prophet in baggy jeans" and "a dangerous loony". They added that Simon and Beth Jordache (Anna Friel) are "larger-than-life, emblematic figures whose significance has outgrown even Brookside." He went on to add that Simon is "the soap's most potent hate figure". In 2003, Frances Traynor from the Daily Record named Simon and his cult one of the show's "most controversial plotlines". Inside Soap's Monroe profiled the character's gall stating "most men have a good line in chat-up when it comes to getting a girl into bed, but Brookside's Simon Howe takes the biscuit! He conned vulnerable Katie Rogers into sleeping with him (without using a condom) by telling her: 'God will protect us.' And she believed him!" Lorna Hughes from the Liverpool Echo said that "religious fanatic Simon is best known for holding Barry Grant hostage and bringing his cult to Brookside Close - blowing up part of it in the process." She added that his departure in the suicide pact was "less well remembered". Peter Grant from the publication branded him "sadistic Simon" who ran a "wacky religious cult" and was a "contender for creep of the year". Paddy Shennan called him a "Brookie beast", "the beast of Brookside Close", "the David Koresh of West Derby" and a "devil in disguise". Another reporter from The Observer profiled the character, stating that "the Close's own David Koresh, he is the leader of a Christian cult which has turned one of the houses into its church." Inside Soap ran a feature compiling "The 100 greatest soap stories ever told". They featured Simon's cult story as their 64th choice. Jon Peake from the magazine included the house explosion in a "greatest disasters in soap" feature. Peake assessed that "crazy cult leader Simon plotted his own personal calamity" on Brookside Close. Claire Brand from the magazine described Simon a "unlamented" character and a "creepy cult leader".

Simon's cult story confused Geoffrey Phillips of the Evening Standard, who questioned the plausibility of them all living in the same house. He stated that "Simon's disciples move in mysterious ways. One minute they all are, huddled over their pocket Bibles, mumbling and nodding, the next they have vanished." Phillips also questioned why they never speak and where they all were supposed to sleep. Mark Lawson from The Independent criticised Brookside for featuring too many dramatic stories in quick succession. Referencing the cult story, Lawson wrote "Simon, the petrol pump attendant, has revealed himself to be the Risen Christ and established a sinister religious and sexual sect in a semi-detached." A writer from Soaplife stated that "not content shocking the soap-watching world with a lesbian affair, the Brookside scriptwriters decided to spice things up even more with strange cult happenings."

Dominic Moffitt from the Liverpool Echo named Simon a "charismatic cult leader" whose stories were some of the show's most shocking moments. Moffitt stated that Simon's "dramatic, violent, and sex-crazed cult was full to the brim with so many shocking storylines we couldn't pick one on its own. He also believed that Simon's stories were popular but a sign that writers were telling stories better suited to a drama than a soap opera. Dick Godfrey from The Journal called it a "bizarre cult" and Simon a "Messiah" who lead Katie and Terry "up the garden path towards salvation". Godfrey also accused Brookside of featuring religious conversion too boost their ratings. Graham Young from the Sandwell Evening Mail said that Simon's cult were "religious nutters" but it was "a commendably original soap story." Their colleague Susan Wallace branded Simon "the biggest creep on TV". She continued that Simon is "as creepy as a bath full of spiders and he's got more spellbinding powers than Svengali." Wallace also believed that the story had "the makings of another Waco siege." Stephanie Bell from Sunday Life branded the character "smooth-talking Simon" who transformed from "Mr-Nice-Guy" to "Mr Nasty" to become a "depraved" and "sinister leader of Brookside's weird religious sect". They also branded him a one-time "placid Christian" who became an "iron-fisted leader" religious leader who "exerts absolute control". Francesca Babb from All About Soap included Simon's "cult classic" storyline in their "most memorable moments" of Brookside feature.
