= Steve Murray (Brookside) =

Fictional character from Brookside

- Brookside character
- Portrayed by: Steven Fletcher
- Duration: 2000–2003
- First appearance: 28 March 2000
- Last appearance: 4 November 2003
- Created by: Phil Redmond
- Spin-off appearances: Brookside: Unfinished Business
In-universe information
- Other names: Steven Murray
- Occupation: Chauffeur
- Father: Marty Murray
- Mother: Jan Murray
- Stepmother: Diane Murray
- Brothers: Anthony Murray
- Sisters: Adele Murray
- Uncles: Christy Murray

Steve Murray is a fictional character from the British Channel 4 soap opera Brookside, played by Steven Fletcher. The character debuted on-screen during the episode broadcast on 28 March 2000. Steve remained on-screen until the final episode of the series, which was broadcast 4 November 2003. Fletcher also played the role in the spin-off show Brookside: Unfinished Business.

== Casting ==
Steven Fletcher began playing the role in 2000 and Steve debuted on-screen during the episode broadcast on 28 March that year. The Murray family were introduced during a rejuvenation of overseen by new producer Paul Marquess. Of Steve's arrival, Marquess revealed that "the Murrays are an ordinary working-class Liverpool family, who will play a key role in taking Brookside back to basics." Fletcher also played the role in a direct to DVD spin-off, titled Brookside: Unfinished Business.

== Development ==
Steve is the eldest of child of Marty (Neil Caple) and Jan Murray (Helen Sheals). On the official Brookside website, Steve was described as a "affable young man with a quiet demeanour". He has a good relationship with his family and is protective over his siblings. He is also "quite mature and level headed" and has an interest in cars wants to become a mechanic. He is also an amateur level boxer and "his main downfall [...] is a tendency to fall to pieces around girls."

In one of Steve's final stories the Murrays begin feuding with new neighbour Jack Michaelson (Paul Duckworth) after he supplies drugs in the community. Steve, Marty and Christy Murray (Glyn Pritchard) all gang up on Michaelson and attack him.

== Storylines ==
When Lindsey Corkhill (Claire Sweeney) sold No.9, the Murray family moved in. In 2002, Steve begins an affair with a married woman, Georgia. When her husband finds out he posts a compromising video of them on the Internet. This is a cause of great embarrassment for Steve when younger sister Adele (Katy Lamont) comes across the video.

After Cinerco tried to buy up the houses, the residents were relieved when Max Farnham (Steven Pinder) sold his house to a private buyer rather than to Cinerco. This relief was short-lived when violent drug-dealer Jack Michaelson (Paul Duckworth) moved in. Michaelson's daughter Suzi (Simone Barry) became friends with Anthony, and the two started taking drugs she had stolen from her father. When Jack discovered cannabis in Suzi's room he stormed around to the Murray's and accused Anthony of being a bad influence on Suzi. When Jan (Helen Sheals) protested Anthony's innocence Jack hit her.

Furious that Michaelson would hit his mother, Steve attacked Jack with planks of wood with the help of father Marty and uncle Christy (Glyn Pritchard). Jack, however, then attacked Christie with a pick-axe handle causing him such injury that he required a kidney removing. Marty later received a call from the hospital saying that Anthony and Suzi were found collapsed in the park after overdosing on drugs. Marty decides this is the last straw and something must be done about Michaelson. After a visit from Barry Grant stirs things up, the neighbours lynch Michaelson from his front window. The exact culprits weren't revealed however it is strongly implied that Marty and Steve were amongst them. The Murray family left after Jan persuaded Marty to sell the house. Adele returned to Leeds, Marty, Anthony and Jan left for a new house while Steve went into business with Tim O'Leary (Philip Olivier) in Wales.

== Reception ==
Merle Brown from Daily Record believed that writers were not giving the Murray's good enough stories. She pleaded, "give them a decent, crazy Brookie storyline soon, please. All characters deserve at least one."
