= Sammy Rogers =

Fictional character from the Channel 4 soap opera Brookside

- Brookside character
- Portrayed by: Rachael Lindsay
- Duration: 1987–1993, 1996, 2001–2003
- First appearance: 7 December 1987
- Last appearance: 30 September 2003
- Created by: Phil Redmond
In-universe information
- Other names: Sammy Daniels
- Occupation: Student; Chambermaid; Teacher
- Father: Frank Rogers
- Mother: Chrissy Rogers
- Stepmother: Lyn Rogers
- Brothers: Geoff Rogers
- Sisters: Katie Rogers
- Husband: Owen Daniels (1991–1996); Richard (1998–2001)
- Daughters: Louise Daniels
- Grandfathers: Jeffrey Rogers; Ted Morgan
- Aunts: Pat
- Nieces: Sophie Rogers

Samantha "Sammy" Rogers (also Daniels) is a fictional character from the British Channel 4 soap opera Brookside, played by Rachael Lindsay. The character debuted on-screen during the episode broadcast on 7 December 1987. Sammy was introduced as part of the Rogers family consisting of parents Frank (Peter Christian) and Chrissy Rogers (Eithne Brown) and their three children Sammy, Katie Rogers (Debbie Reynolds/Diane Burke) and Geoff Rogers (Kevin Carson). Lindsay secured the role in 1987 after she learned that Brookside was auditioning for a new family. Lindsay knew someone already working on the show and they introduced her to his agent who helped secure the role. Sammy is originally characterised as a rebellious and headstrong teenager and animal rights enthusiast. Sammy is Brookside's wild child character who never accepts responsibility for her actions. Producers created a long-running relationship story with Owen Daniels (Danny McCall). They begin a romance while at school and writers developed them into a married couple with a child.

The character was used to portray the issue of alcoholism. Sammy becomes an addict after she is involved in a car crash which leaves Owen paralysed. Writers depicted Sammy as an alcoholic throughout her entire duration. They also used Sammy and Owen's daughter, Louise, to provide Sammy with more dramatic stories such as child abandonment and depression. In 1996, producers chose to further explore the issue of child abandonment. Sammy leaves Louise home alone while she goes on holiday abroad and is arrested for neglecting her. The story outraged viewers and the show received numerous complaints. Sammy also has a relationship with an older man Tim Derby (Christopher Blake) and develops an obsession with Max Farnham (Steven Pinder), after they have a one-night stand. Lindsay decided to leave the role in 1993, but returned in 1996 and again in 2001 and remained until the series was cancelled by Channel 4. Sammy has received a mixed response from critics of the genre. Andy Medhurst from The Observer described Sammy as a "deceitful" and "neglectful slattern" for her parental skills. The Guardian's Stuart Jeffries branded her "the mother from hell" and criticised her characterisation, while other critics have praised her headstrong persona.

== Casting ==
Lindsay secured the role of Sammy in 1987. She had only previously appeared in school productions when she learned that Brookside was auditioning for a new family. Lindsay knew someone appearing in the show and they took her to meet with his agent, who then secured Lindsay an audition. She was successful and was called back to screen test auditions alongside other cast members. Producers then contacted Lindsay to offer her the role, which she accepted. Lindsay was aged fifteen when she won the role and was nervous about joining the cast. She told a Brookside.com reporter that "I'd been up terrified the night before. I knew my lines inside out – backwards! – and I remember getting on set and it was all very daunting, particularly as I was only 15 at the time. And I totally went blank – I couldn't remember one line. It was terrifying."

Sammy is introduced as part of the Rogers family consisting of parents Frank (Peter Christian) and Chrissy Rogers (Eithne Browne) and their three children Sammy, Katie (Debbie Reynolds/Diane Burke) and Geoff Rogers (Kevin Carson/Stephen Walters). The introduction of the Rogers family was planned months in advance by the show's executive producer, Phil Redmond who wanted to revamp Brookside. Sammy and her siblings were young characters that producers wanted to appeal to younger viewers. The Rogers children were also created to replace the original character Damon Grant (Simon O'Brien) and his friends, who had grown up and left the show. Redmond added that it also allowed the storylines to focus on life at the school again. On 10 August 1987, Redmond revealed that the names and character details of the Rogers family. Non of the roles had been cast but he planned their on-screen arrival for December 1987 episodes. The Rogers' casting details were publicised on 3 October 1987, with a promotional photograph of the Rogers family next to the Brookside Close street sign. They all began filming that month and producers planned their on-screen arrival for December 1987.

== Development ==
=== Characterisation ===
"I've been lucky because I've dealt with such powerful subjects. In one role, I've experienced things that some actresses don't get to do in their whole career. I've gone from schoolgirl to wife to mother."

— Lindsay on her experience of playing Sammy. (1992)

In her early years, Sammy is portrayed as a "rebellious and headstrong" teenager. Sammy knows what she wants from her life. Lindsay "really liked" Sammy because she is clever and "she knew what she wanted". She is an animal rights enthusiast and is portrayed as a vegetarian and is interested in animal activism demonstrations. A writer from the show's official website described her as Brookside's "proverbial bad penny, perpetually rolling back into the Close bringing bad news in her wake." In her education, Sammy is portrayed as "a lively school girl who liked a laugh" and has "wily ways". Over her tenure writers transformed her into an alcoholic as she dealt with a life "tinged with tragedy". Sammy eventually becomes a "less than ideal mother" because of the way she treats her daughter, Louise. Despite her flaws, Sammy's father Frank, "thinks the world of her". She is also "confident and attractive with no shortage of boyfriends."

Writers often entrusted Lindsay with dramatic storylines such as car crashes and alcoholism. Lindsay told author Geoff Tibballs, in his book Brookside - The First Ten Years, that "Sammy's been through a lot of ups and downs, personally I don't think I could have coped with what she's been through." Lindsay was also humbled that producers often rewarded her with the show's biggest stories. She concluded that in just one role, she experienced things most other actresses do not experience in their entire careers. In July 1996, Lindsay stated "Sammy is wild to play. She's crazy and I love being dramatic." In her later years, Sammy has a more classier look and wears designer clothing. Lindsay revealed that she shopped for Sammy's clothes with the help of the Brookside wardrobe department. Sammy's clothes were not authentic designer garments and Lindsay purchased them from high street stores.

=== Alcoholism ===
Writers used Sammy to portray the issue of alcoholism. Lindsay was happy to be chosen to portray the issue because it exhibited that anyone can develop an addiction. She told Tibballs that "I was particularly glad we did the alcoholism story because it can happen to anyone - like you'd have thought Sammy was too sensible to have got in a mess like that." Lindsay chose not to research alcoholism with real life alcoholics because she believed it to be an invasion of their privacy. She branded her portrayal "a real challenge" without the extra research. Lindsay still wanted to depict the issue authentically and realistically, and was loath for it to be comedic. She added that she did not want viewers to laugh at Sammy while she is "giggling and falling off stools".

Writers used the trauma of a car accident as a catalyst for Sammy's descent into alcohol addiction. Sammy blames herself for her boyfriend, Owen Daniels' (Danny McCall) injuries sustained in the crash. Writers chose the alcoholic beverage cider to get Sammy addicted. She then starts buying gin and her behaviour spirals out of control. Sammy gets drunk and visits Owen in the hospital where she causes disorder and Chrissy is forced to take her home. In another episode, Sammy agrees to babysit Jessica Choi (Anna Sung) and steals the contents of the Choi's alcoholic drinks cabinet. Michael Choi (David Yip) and his girlfriend Alison Gregory (Alyson Spiro) return home to a drunken Sammy. Alison is a scientist and Sammy begins to argue with her over animal rights. Sammy retaliates by vandalising Alison's car, spray-painting it with the slogan "murderer".

Chrissy becomes concerned about Sammy's excessive drinking, intervenes and sends her to visit Dr. Joseph O'Rourke (Christian Rodska) for counselling. This causes problems with Frank who is in denial about the severity of Sammy's addiction. When Sammy discovers that Owen may be permanently paralysed she begins drinking more frequently and ends up urinating in her bed. In 1996, Lindsay branded it "one awful scene" and "incredibly embarrassing to do - in fact it still makes me cringe just thinking about it." In 2001, Lindsay recalled that wetting the bed was one of the most difficult scenes she had ever filmed at Brookside. She cited that the majority male film crew made the experience "quite embarrassing".

=== Relationship with Owen Daniels ===
In 1989, Producers created a long-running romance story between Sammy and Owen, a fellow high school student in the year above her. Owen is Sammy's first serious boyfriend. The story begins when Owen realises that he is attracted to Sammy and creates a plan to spend time with her. Owen visits Sammy's home and accuses her of sending him a Valentine's Day card which caused his girlfriend to break up with him. Owen is actually single and lies about receiving a card. His plan works and he and Sammy begin dating. McCall told Graeme Kay from TV Guide that Owen "fancies her like mad. He's very sure of himself and goes about chatting her up in a ridiculous manner." Sammy enjoys the attention from Owen and begins playing along. McCall added that "she quite likes him, and it becomes a game of cat-and-mouse." Frank and Chrissy did not agree on much but they were united on their approval of Owen. In their early years, jealousy became an issue for their relationship. Sammy becomes convinced that Owen and her best friend Nisha Batra (Sunetra Sarker) are flirting at a decorating party. Owen is jealous when Sammy goes on holiday and has photographs taken with another man. Owen is further angered when Sammy and Nisha socialise with Anthony "Tony" Hampson (Alex Mousley) and Francis "Kav" Kavanagh (Nick Lamont) at a nightclub.

Writers created the couple's first major storyline when they steal a car to go joyriding. Sammy convinces a reluctant Owen to get into the stolen vehicle alongside their friends Nisha, Kav, Tony and Ronnie Williams (Claire Robinson). The police find the group in the stolen car and a police chase occurs. They lose control of the vehicle and it crashes, killing Kav and Tony instantly. Nisha and Ronnie escape unharmed but Sammy and Owen are rushed to hospital and are both in comas. Sammy regains consciousness first and when Owen awakes he is told that he is temporarily paralysed and is given a wheelchair. The story attracted praise and the Home Office singled out Brookside's portrayal of the consequences that arise from joy-riding for special commendation. Footage from the accident was also used in a public information film. After this Sammy becomes addicted to alcohol writers used the opportunity to break up the pair. Sammy begins drinking because she blames herself for Owen's injuries. She stays with Owen out of pity but continues to avoid spending time with him favouring getting drunk. Sammy's behaviour causes Owen to behave out of character and he smashes the Rogers front door in and tries to force Sammy to drink a bottle of gin. His outburst causes Sammy to end their relationship.

Writers wasted no time pairing the duo with other characters in the series. Though off-screen Lindsay and McCall began a relationship together. Sammy begins a relationship with an older man, Tim Derby (Christopher Blake). Tim had divorced his wife and has a daughter the same age as Sammy. Their relationship causes problems with Frank who cannot accept their age difference. Their feud causes Sammy to become estranged from her family and she moves in with Tim. Frank warns Tim that he will get revenge if he hurts his daughter. Tim decides to introduce Sammy to his children Chloe and Adam but the evening ends awkwardly. He realises that Sammy is immature and he breaks up with her. She refuses to leave and he takes her back to Brookside Close and throws her belongings over the pavements. Sammy tries to win Tim back but he throws water over her. She then pretends to be pregnant but Tim is aware of her lies. Sammy retaliates by throwing a house brick through Tim's home window. McCall told Tibballs that it was "horrendous" to watch Sammy move on with another man. He added, "It made me sick to watch this old man with Owen's girlfriend." McCall noted that when he met Blake, he "felt no venom" towards him because he was completely different from Tim.

Owen begins dating Grace and Sammy becomes jealous. She tries to seduce Owen and Grace responds by confronting Sammy and throwing a drink over her. Owen eventually reconciles with Sammy and they have sex inside the Sullivan's house. Sammy discovers she is pregnant which makes Owen angry. He decides to be honourable and asks Sammy to marry him. Sammy's father Frank begins meddling in their relationship and forces Owen to quit studying and find a job to support his new family. In 1991, Sammy's mother Chrissy was written out of the show. Chrissie and Frank had been arguing and decided to separate in the lead up to her departure. The decision to axe the character was made by Brookside's executive producer Mal Young. He was unhappy with the Rogers family dynamic and thought their stories were "going round in circles". Young told Browne that she had to leave to save the remainder of the Rogers family from being axed the following year. Young's research for the show found that there was an increasing number of families with children splitting up in the United Kingdom. He concluded that he wanted to reflect this scenario with the Rogers family. Writers decided to coincide Chrissy's departure with Sammy's wedding episode to heighten the drama. Chrissy had felt trapped in her marriage to Frank and believes that history is repeating itself. She resents Frank for forcing Sammy and Owen to marry and decides to leave her family. While Sammy and Owen host a wedding reception at the Rogers family home, Chrissy sneaks upstairs and packs up her belongings and leaves for good.

Sammy gives birth to a daughter during episodes broadcast on 5 June 1992. Owen secures a new job selling conservatories and misses the birth. The events lead Sammy into depression and she struggles to cope with Louise. Sammy rejects Louise and leaves her outside the maternity ward in her pram. Owen is furious with Sammy's behaviour and demands a divorce. He takes Louise and moves into his mother's house. Frank decides to meddle in their relationship once again and forces them to reconcile. Owen forgives Sammy and the decide to look for their own home away from Brookside close.

Off-screen Owen became popular with female viewers of Brookside. McCall believed that his character's popularity was attributed to when Sammy treated Owen badly and they felt sorry for him. McCall felt sympathy for Owen and added that he would not tolerate Sammy's behaviour towards Owen. In addition, he disliked Sammy's interfering father Frank, adding "I certainly could never have lived under the same roof as Frank." In 1993, Lindsay and McCall decided to leave Brookside to pursue other acting opportunities. In their absence, Sammy and Owen had been renting a small flat. Owen worked for an insurance company but the couple wanted to buy their own family home.

=== Return and child abandonment ===
In 1996, Lindsay was asked to reprise the role and she accepted. McCall did not return as Owen and the pair had ended their off-screen relationship. Lindsay told Jon Peake from Inside Soap that "when the Brookie producers asked me back, I knew it was going to be with a bang." Lindsay was referencing Sammy's bad behaviour which is only escalated upon her return. Sammy returns to Liverpool after her marriage to Owen ends and she is accompanied by her daughter Louise. Lindsay described Sammy as "out of control" and is "out all the time, coming home drunk and bringing men back." Katie is forced to deal with the reprisals from their disapproving landlord David Crosbie (John Burgess). Sammy begins to neglect Louise and forces other people to mind her. Lindsay added "Sammy leaves her daughter with anyone who'll have her."

Producers created a topical story for Sammy and Louise exploring the issue of child abandonment. Mothers leaving their children home alone had become a problem in the United Kingdom during the 1990s. Sammy continues to leave Louise home alone when she goes to work and socialises with her boyfriend Noel. Sammy agrees to go on holiday with Noel and leaves Louise behind. She writes a note for Katie asking her to look after Louise, which goes unnoticed and Louise is left alone for two days. Sammy's neighbours realise that Louise is living alone and they contact social services. Lindsay told a reporter from the Lancashire Telegraph that Sammy is "guilty" of neglect but she only believed Louise would be alone for five minutes. Sammy tries to persuade Noel to wait for Katie to return home and only left shortly before Katie was due home.

Lindsay explained Sammy's neglectful behaviour adding, "Sammy loves Louise but, to be honest, the basic problem in this case is her serious weakness where men are concerned." Lindsay would have refused Noel's holiday offer, "but unfortunately Sammy puts men before her child." She believed that Louise is not Sammy's main priority because she is too invested in keeping a boyfriend. Sammy will "do whatever it takes to get him to love her." She concluded that her character's behaviour was wrong, irresponsible and she took advantage of Katie. Following her return, Sammy "seems to be mixed up and unbalanced. It's a shame she lets herself down so badly. She's been living like an irresponsible 16-year-old, going out and getting drunk with lots of men." When Sammy returns from her holiday she arrested for leaving Louise home alone. Her behaviour causes more problems with Katie, who finds it difficult to hold Sammy to account for her actions. Burke told an Inside Soap reporter that Katie is "angry" with Sammy and does not know what else she can do. She added that Sammy is "just not listening. Sammy thinks she's a bit of a free spirit. She wants to do her own thing, so she's landed Katie with a child who's not Katie's responsibility." Katie does not want Sammy to leave because she is the only family she has left. This leaves Katie conflicted and Burke believed that Katie just wanted Sammy to "accept her responsibilities as a mother".

The child abandonment story was so controversial that it received more complaints than the show's incest story between Nat (John Sandford) and Georgia Simpson (Helen Grace). Despite the rise in viewer complaints, the show's creator Phil Redmond credited the story for helping Brookside regain half-a-million viewers to its television ratings. In August 1996, Matthew Wright from the Daily Mirror reported that Lindsay had finished filming and Sammy would leave the series again. A Brookside executive told Wright that "Sammy's departure leaves the Close short of appealing women."

=== Obsession with Max Farnham ===
In 1996, producers created a new story for Sammy in which she becomes obsessed with Max Farnham (Steven Pinder). Sammy and Max get drunk and have sex, which leaves Sammy with unrealistic expectations about their future. When Sammy realises that Max is not interested, she begins scheming to trap him. Lindsay told Helen Childs from Inside Soap that her character is convinced that their sexual encounter was the start of a relationship. Max tells Sammy that he was drunk and does not want it to happen again. Lindsay explained that her character's emotions cause her to make poor judgements regarding Max. Sammy is "very insecure and emotionally screwed up and she just can't deal with it being a one-off. She's desperate to be in a relationship and be loved by someone, and now she feels used." When Max lets Sammy down, Lindsay revealed that Sammy "turns on him and goes wild, accusing him of using her." Sammy decides to humiliate Max by screaming and shouting at him in public. Lindsay said they were "embarrassing moments when she starts causing trouble." Sammy thinks this will convince Max to stick by her and "she just won't be told".

Lindsay defended Sammy's behaviour and rationalised that Max is an "attractive guy, he's established, he's a business man, he's got money and his own home. He's quite a catch and she really likes him." Sammy does not have the security of money, her own home and "sees Max as the answer to all her problems." Sammy is also lonely and envisaged herself and Louise moving in with Max. Sammy then comes up with a new plan to trap Max and lies that she is pregnant with his child. Lindsay felt sorry for Sammy because she is so "vulnerable". She concluded that Sammy has "no self-respect and embarrasses herself completely" around Max. In the book Real Soap: Brookside, Pinder told author Kay Nicholls that "Sammy was just an aberration, Max loved the attention but it was just a one-night stand and he was drunk."

=== 2001 return ===
In 2001, Lindsay was contacted by producers at Mersey TV asking her to return to the show. She had already moved back to Liverpool, which made accepting the invitation convenient. Lindsay had also missed playing Sammy and had not worked in television for some time. Upon her return, she signed a one-year contract to re-join the regular cast of Brookside. Sammy returned during the episode broadcast on 30 November 2001. Lindsay told Dawn Collinson from the Liverpool Echo that Sammy's return would feature numerous "trademark twists and hidden agendas". Sammy's reappearance causes drama with Katie as they resume their troublesome sibling relationship. Burke told Merle Brown (Daily Record) that "there's been a lot of arguing scenes again and they were always my favourite - as Katie and Sammy - as we did loads of them."

Sammy returns to support her sister, Katie who is mourning the death of her boyfriend Clint Moffat (Greg Pateras). He was murdered by Ron Dixon (Vince Earl) and Sammy decides to help Katie get revenge on the Dixon family. In the process, writers revisited Sammy's earlier obsession with Max Farnham. Sammy decides to destroy Max's marriage to Jacqui Dixon (Alex Fletcher), by attempting to seduce Max and then expose his infidelity. Writers had previously created a one-night stand story for the characters, but Pinder believed that Max was no longer interested in Sammy. Lindsay enjoyed her return story and stated "I'm enjoying what I'm doing at the moment especially the seducing of Max which is coming up over Christmas, that has been quite fun to play." She added that she found filming the "very saucy" scenes "hard" because she was "very self-conscious" and had to wear "sexy underwear" during filming. She told Brown that filming it was "hysterical" and she was thankful that Pinder found it a comedic experience. Writers then created another romance story in which Sammy becomes involved with Ted Moran (Ted Robbins). Ted is a "gangster-type" character who poses danger for Sammy.

== Reception ==
The Liverpool Echo's Dawn Collinson stated "In the Brookside era of Barry and Terry's dodgy scams and dodgier perms, Rachael Lindsay was the wild child rebel, ginsoaked and trouble. As feisty schoolgirl Sammy Rogers, she wreaked havoc through the Close before marrying local heartthrob Owen, having his baby and eventually bidding a temporary farewell to her TV home." Collinson added that Lindsay was envied by thousands of female fans. Observing Sammy's interest in green activism, Suzanne More writing for The Guardian quipped "young Sammy Rogers in Brookside is at it too (when she is not swigging gin in her bedroom) badgering her mum to buy ecologically sound products. 'I'm not made of money' is the pragmatic reply." Jon Peake writing for Inside Soap branded Sammy as a "wild child" and observed that she was "wilder than ever" during her 1996 return. Peake opined that Sammy and Owen's marriage was "doomed to failure". Another writer from the publication said that she was a "wild child" but when she returned she was "older, but certainly not wiser." Another said that "headstrong" Sammy has "always been a wild one. Her past misdemeanours include under-age boozing, car crashes and an affair with a man old enough to be her father."

In the book Real Soap: Brookside, author Kay Nicholls wrote that Sammy and Owen's "marriage was doomed (no surprise there, then) and the two split in 1996." In his book, The Who's Who of Soap Operas, author Anthony Hayward branded Sammy a "headstrong" character. Dave Lanning from The Sunday People said "Sammy Rogers, sister of Kate, returns to Brookside from a busted marriage and is drinking hard. Fine brood, these Rogers girls. One sister has an eating disorder, the other won't stop boozing." The Daily Record's Merle Brown called Sammy "rebellious", a "sexpot" and branded the Rogers family a group of "luckless" characters. Of Sammy and Max's scenes, Brown jested it added "mistletoe raunchiness" to Brookside's festive "doom" stories.

The Daily Mirror's Wright branded Sammy a "boozy Brookside beauty" and "wayward single mum". Karen Hockney, also from the Daily Mirror, named Sammy as Owen's "alcoholic wife" and described their relationship as a "rocky romance". A Lancashire Telegraph writer branded the child abandonment plot a "hard-hitting storyline". Andy Medhurst from The Observer described Sammy as a "deceitful" character, and later a "neglectful slattern" for her treatment of Louise. He added that Sammy discovered her behaviour is where "quasi-feminism" in soaps ends and "old-style family values take hold with a vengeance."

Stuart Jeffries from The Guardian criticised Sammy's characterisation and child abandonment story. He branded her "the mother from hell" and stated that her "characterisation has been woeful: a two-dimensional woman who can't see that what she did was wrong, served up for viewers to hate." The Guardian's Jim Shelley disliked Sammy and called her an "argumentative alcoholic". He later deplored "the fact is, Brookside is literally not worth watching at the moment. Sammy, after eight years out of the series, has come back to re-enact her performance as an unconvincing alcoholic trying to cop off with Max." Shelley also criticised Brookside's portrayal of marriage and opined that Sammy and Owen were one of the show's only happy couples. Their colleague Gareth McLean reviewed Sammy's wedding episode and called it the "disintegration of the Rogers family" and called it both "painful and poignant". McLean observed that Sammy and Jacqui's feud was reminiscent of the class war between the Corkhills and Grants featured in 1980s episodes of Brookside. McLean believed that Sammy's pursuit of Max was over the top and joked that she should have got a T-shirt with the slogan "I'm Sammy. Fly me." He added, "a sledgehammer to crack a nut? It'll all end in tears. Probably mine."
