= Peter Christian =

Peter Christian may refer to:

- Peter Christian (actor) (born 1947), English actor
- Peter M. Christian (born 1947), President of the Federated States of Micronesia
