= Catherine Rogers =

Catherine Rogers may refer to:

- Cathy Rogers, TV executive

== See also ==
- Katie Rogers, character in Brookside
