= Lindsey Corkhill =

Fictional character from Brookside

- Brookside character
- Portrayed by: Claire Sweeney
- Duration: 1991–1992, 1995–2003
- First appearance: 12 June 1991
- Last appearance: 4 November 2003
- Created by: Phil Redmond
- Spin-off appearances: Brookside: The Lost Weekend (1997); Brookside: Friday the 13th (1998)
In-universe information
- Father: Jimmy Corkhill
- Mother: Jackie Corkhill
- Brothers: Little Jimmy Corkhill; William Corkhill
- Husband: Gary Stanlow (1991–1998); Peter Phelan (1998–1999)
- Daughters: Kylie Stanlow
- Grandfathers: Albie Corkhill; William Walker
- Grandmothers: Margaret Corkhill
- Uncles: Billy Corkhill; Frankie Corkhill
- Aunts: Val Walker
- First cousins: Rod Corkhill; Tracy Corkhill

Lindsey Corkhill (also Stanlow and Phelan) is a fictional character from the British Channel 4 soap opera Brookside, played by Claire Sweeney. The character debuted on-screen during the episode broadcast on 12 June 1991. Lindsey was originally a recurring character and was later promoted to the show's regular cast in 1995. After departing in 2001, she made additional appearances in 2002 and 2003.

== Casting ==
Sweeney was cast in the role of Lindsey in 1991. The actress originally played the role on a recurring basis for one year. In 1995, Sweeney was invited to reprise the role on a permanent basis and her character moved onto Brookside Close with the rest of the Corkhill family.

== Development ==
Lindsey was introduced as the daughter of Jimmy (Dean Sullivan) and Jackie Corkhill (Sue Jenkins). Sweeney created a good rapport with her on-screen parents. She felt like her time spent with Jenkins was like that she spent with her real mother. Writers created a series of long-running storylines for the character, following her reintroduction in 1995. Lindsey is accompanied by her young daughter, Kylie and is married to Gary Stanlow (Andrew Fillis). Writers initially characterised Lindsey with an attitude of moral superiority in comparison to the rest of the Corkhill family. Through her marriage to Gary, they portrayed the more recognisable Corkhill characteristics. Gary is a drug dealer and neglects his wife favouring his life of crime. She soon begins to crave affection elsewhere and falls in love with her neighbour Mike Dixon (Paul Byatt).

Production filmed on location on board a Mersey Ferry for Lindsey and Mike's first kiss. Sweeney told Victoria Ross from Inside Soap that she was nervous about filming in public and struggled to remember her lines. After their kiss, Lindsey and Mike's relationship continues to grow and they begin an affair. Sweeney defended her character's behaviour and noted that Lindsey married Gary when she was nineteen. She believed that Lindsey "is a really nice girl" but she has not "had the chance to live her life." Sweeney stated that it was a "love at first sight" scenario between Lindsey and Mike. Writers played on one of Brookside's most endured family feuds by creating a relationship between Corkhill and Dixon family members. The two families had been enemies following the death of Tony Dixon (Mark Lennock) in a car accident caused by Jimmy. Mike's father Ron Dixon (Vince Earl) never forgave Jimmy they hide their relationship from their families to avoid more drama. Sweeney added "It's a bit of a Romeo and Juliet situation, because Ron hates everyone connected to Jimmy Corkhill."

Byatt agreed that the pair had an "instant attraction" and told Jon Peake (Inside Soap) that Mike is "very optimistic" about a future with Lindsey. Mike is "sensitive and understanding and everything Gary isn't" and better suited to Lindsey. The character posed more issues for Mike such as already having a child and her husband being a dangerous individual. Byatt believed that Mike is not bothered about becoming a parent to Kylie and is blasé about Gary. He explained "Mike doesn't know Gary that well, so he doesn't know what he's capable of."

Their affair was developed into serious relationship depicting Lindsey leaving Gary to be with Mike. He moves Lindsey and Kylie into the Dixon's house when Ron is away on holiday. When he returns he is angry that Lindsey is in his home. Byatt explained that to Ron, "a Corkhill is a Corkhill - and that means trouble." Despite being "furious" with their affair, Ron does mellow when he realises that their love is genuine. The risk that Gary poses and the ongoing drama between Ron and Jimmy lead Lindsey and Mike to the conclusion that they can no longer remain on Brookside Close. Mike's friend Keith offers for them to move to Turkey and work in a local bar. Byatt described it "just the opportunity they've been looking for."

When Lindsey's mother, Jackie realises the extent of Gary and Jimmy's drug dealing, she leaves Jimmy. She also helps Lindsey, Mike and Kylie escape the country and being a new life in Australia rather than Turkey. Sweeney explained that fleeing to Australia was their "only option". Lindsey had been hiding inside the Dixon house fearful that Gary would find her. She only managed to leave the house when she hid in Mike's car boot. Gary learns of their plan and plants drugs inside Kylie's soft toy. Lindsey and Mike are subsequently arrested in Bangkok and sent to jail facing drug trafficking charges. Jenkins explained that "the one thing she wanted to do was protect Lindsey and Kylie. She'd done everything to help them start a new life. Now it's backfired." Jenkins described it as "every mother's worst nightmare" and she decides to start a campaign to free "the Bangkok three". Jackie is scared she may never see Lindsey again and this motivates her campaign. Jenkins concluded that what Gary did to his wife was an "evil act". Sweeney hoped the drug arrest story would not break-up "the lovely couple" Lindsey and Mike.

Producers struggled to create an realistic Thai airport set. The scenes were not scheduled to be filmed at Bangkok airport but production wanted the scenes to look authentic. Researchers could not obtain any photos of the airport's interior or any information featured in aviation magazines. Producers contacted the Managing Director of the Airport Authority of Thailand for help, who provided them with photographs, brochures and newsletters to help them recreate the setting. Lindsey and Mike remain incarcerated in a Thai prison for months. Jackie's campaign to free them results in Kylie being returned to the United Kingdom. Jimmy and Ron agree to put their feud aside, go to Thailand together and attempt to secure the Lindsey and Mike's release. Their efforts are unsuccessful and they return home without their children. The two fathers enlist the help of neighbour David Crosbie (John Burgess) and a local member of parliament. They travel to London and meet with foreign office ministers and members of the Thai embassy, which have a positive effect on the case.

== Storylines ==
Lindsey Corkhill, like her brother Little Jimmy (George Christopher) brought a lot of trouble and anguish to her dysfunctional parents Jimmy and Jackie. As the character develops, she becomes involved in a circle of organised crime. In 1996, Lindsey had an affair with Mike Dixon (Paul Byatt). In revenge for this her husband Gary plants drugs in daughter Kylie's (Jessica Allen) teddy bear before the two head for Australia. The two are arrested en route in Bangkok. Lindsey's father Jimmy and Mike's father Ron had been enemies after Jimmy had accidentally killed Ron's son Tony. The two, however, fought a campaign to free their respective children, first releasing Lindsey and later Mike.

Later in 1997, Mike Dixon decides to publish a book about his experience in Bangkok. In failing to credit Lindsey, she decides to break with him. After her break with Mike, Lindsey becomes engaged to Peter Phelan (Samuel Kane), but soon after she has a passionate affair with Barry Grant (Paul Usher). Lindsey and Peter do, however, marry nearly a year later in the November 1998 spin-off Brookside: Friday the 13th, but only after her and father Jimmy are pursued by two armed gangsters intent on killing Jimmy. The marriage between Lindsey and Peter did not last long, with them separating after just two months of marriage, and Peter moved away from the close. Lindsey and Peter divorced not long after.

In 1998, Gary turned up again and demands a divorce settlement and access to daughter Kylie. Intent on getting these, he harasses Lindsey until she threatens him with a gun. Gary backs down and the two divorce on Lindsey's terms, leaving her free to marry Peter. Lindsey Corkhill returned along with Barry Grant in 2003 for the final episode. Lindsey persuades her father to come and live with her in a house in the grounds of Barry's mansion in Blaydon, Tyne and Wear. Jimmy gives Lindsey his blessing and eventually moves to Newcastle to live with Lindsey and Barry.

Lindsey was bisexual. In 2000, Lindsey was in a same-sex relationship for a time with a woman named Shelley. Lindsey was deeply in love with Shelley, but Shelley soon had eyes for Jackie and broke off her relationship with Lindsey, leaving Lindsey heartbroken. Jackie rejected Shelley's advances.

== Reception ==
Inside Soap reporter Jon Peake branded Lindsey and Mike's arrest for drug smuggling as "one of soap's hardest-hitting storylines". He wrote an article about story's realism and emphasised that such arrests had become a common occurrence in the 1990s. Lorna Hughes from the Liverpool Echo said that Brookside was known for its well remembered and controversial stories. She added "admittedly some, like that bizarre attempt to turn Lindsey Corkhill into a gun-toting gangster, are probably best forgotten." Hughes added that Lindsey and Mike's arrest in Thailand was another forgotten story. Katy Brent from Closer echoed their sentiment, stating "It all went a bit nuts in the last few years when Lindsey Corkhil suddenly went from being a struggling single mum, to a gun-toting gangster mam with a taste for women. Struggling ratings, did someone say?"
