= Anthony Milner =

Anthony Milner may refer to:

- Anthony Milner (composer)
- Anthony Milner (historian)

== See also ==
- Anthony Milner Lane, theoretical nuclear physicist
