= Chrissy Rogers =

Fictional character from Brookside

- Brookside character
- Portrayed by: Eithne Browne
- Duration: 1987–1991, 1993
- First appearance: 1 December 1987
- Last appearance: 15 November 1993
- Created by: Phil Redmond
In-universe information
- Occupation: Receptionist; School Governor; Secretary
- Father: Ted Morgan
- Sisters: Pat
- Husband: Frank Rogers (until 1993)
- Sons: Geoff Rogers
- Daughters: Sammy Rogers; Katie Rogers
- Granddaughters: Louise Daniels; Sophie Rogers
- Uncles: Eddie

Chrissy Rogers is a fictional character from the British Channel 4 soap opera Brookside, played by Eithne Browne. The character debuted on-screen during the episode broadcast on 1 December 1987. Chrissy is introduced into the series as part of a new family, the Rogers', which consists of Chrissy and her husband, Frank Rogers (Peter Christian); and their children, Sammy Rogers (Rachael Lindsay), Katie Rogers (Debbie Reynolds/Diane Burke) and Geoff Rogers (Kevin Carson). Browne left the show in 1991 and Chrissy leaves after the break-up of her marriage, departing on 8 November 1991. Browne reprised the role in 1993, after Frank is killed off in a car crash storyline. She made her final appearance as Chrissy during the episode broadcast on 15 November 1993.

== Development ==
The introduction of the Rogers family was planned months in advance by the show's executive producer, Phil Redmond. He planned to rejuvenate Brookside via a new family whose children are young and would appeal to the show's younger viewers. The Rogers children were to replace the original character Damon Grant (Simon O'Brien) and his friends, who had grown up and left the show. On 10 August 1987, Redmond revealed the names and character details of the Rogers family. None of the roles had been cast but he planned their on-screen arrival for December 1987 episodes. The Rogers family casting details were publicised on 3 October 1987, with a promotional photograph of the clan next to the Brookside Close street sign. They all began filming that month. Browne made her first appearance as Chrissy during the episode broadcast on 1 December 1987.

In 1989, Chrissy becomes a school governor. In 1990, Chrissy attempts to mobilise the neighbours into protesting against the building of Brookside Parade near their homes, but the campaign fails. She is then made redundant but soon secures a job as a school secretary.

Chrissy originally departs during the episode broadcast on 8 November 1991. Browne later reprised the role for three episodes which were broadcast between 10-15 November 1991.

== Reception ==
In 1998, writers from Inside Soap published an article about the top ten characters they wanted to return to the soap. Chrissy was featured and they described her as "Katie's strong-willed mother who outgrew her marriage to Neanderthal truck driver husband, Frank."
