= Frank Rogers (Brookside) =

Fictional character from Brookside

- Brookside character
- Portrayed by: Peter Christian
- Duration: 1987–1993
- First appearance: 1 December 1987
- Last appearance: 5 November 1993
In-universe information
- Other names: Francis Rogers
- Occupation: Lorry driver Shop steward
- Father: Jeffrey Rogers
- Wife: Chrissy Rogers (until 1993); Lyn Matthews (1993)
- Sons: Geoff Rogers
- Daughters: Sammy Rogers; Katie Rogers
- Stepsons: Gavin Matthews
- Stepdaughters: Alison Matthews
- Granddaughters: Louise Daniels; Sophie Rogers
- Uncles: Stan

Frank Rogers is a fictional character from the British Channel 4 soap opera Brookside, played by Peter Christian. The character made his first on-screen appearance during the episode broadcast 1 December 1987 and remained in the show for an additional six years, being killed off in the episode aired on 5 November 1993.

== Creation and casting ==
The Rogers family were planned far in advance by the show's executive producer, Phil Redmond. He planned to revamp Brookside with a new family that has young children, which would appeal to the younger audience demographic. These characters were to replace the original character Damon Grant (Simon O'Brien) and his friends, who had grown up and left the show. On 10 August 1987, Redmond revealed the names and character details of the Rogers family but noted that none of the roles had been cast but he planned their on-screen arrival for December 1987 episodes. The Rogers family casting details were publicised on 3 October 1987, with a promotional photograph of them beside the Brookside Close street sign. They all began filming that month. Christian made his first appearance as Frank during the episode broadcast on 1 December 1987. Christian originally played the character of Frank Blackburn in 1982, who was best friends with original character, Gavin Taylor (Daniel Webb).

== Development ==
Frank, a lorry driver, had been promised a desk job but failed to gain the promotion. The breakdown of their marriage deeply affects their youngest daughter Katie Rogers (Diane Burke). Burke told the Liverpool Echo's Peter Grant that "as the youngest daughter of Frank and Chrissy Rogers, [Katie] had a lot on her plate."

Playing a father of three in the soap was challenging for Christian. He told Tim Oglethorpe from Liverpool Echo that "playing a dad has to be the great challenge for me." Christian added that the show's executive producer, Phil Redmond, usually looked for actors that shared similarities with their characters. He added that "on this particular matter, there is at least one big difference between Frank and myself." In the show, Frank drives an old Cortina car. Christian revealed that he received fan mail from viewers wanting to know more about the vehicle. In 1990, writers explored the issue of unemployment via Frank when he loses his job as a lorry driver. Christian told Oglethorpe that he related to his character because he experienced being out of work in the acting industry.

Frank later enters a relationship with Lyn McLoughlin. He has to fight off unwanted advances from Lyn's sister Bev McLoughlin (Sarah White). Frank's departure storyline saw him killed in a car crash caused by a "drug-crazed" Jimmy Corkhill (Dean Sullivan). The accident happens as Frank tries to make it to his wedding reception to Lyn McLoughlin (Sharon Power). Frank dies just after reaching the hospital, and his other passenger Tony Dixon (Mark Lennock) is in a coma for three months before dying in the hospital. Brookside's executive producer Mal Young defended the decision to kill Frank because it created emotional drama. He told a reporter from The Observer that "people say they cried when Frank Rogers died. I feel that makes me successful. I feel it was therefore good drama. It is not cruel because it is not real. You do like to play with your emotions. That's entertainment."

== Storylines ==
Frank arrived on Brookside Close in December 1987 with his wife Chrissy (Eithne Brown) and children, renting No.7 from Harry Cross (Bill Dean). Frank is promised a desk job at his lorry firm but they do not offer him the position. He travels to London to sort the problem out, but his lorry is stolen and he faces disciplinary action. Frank decides to upscale and buys the more spacious No.5 in 1989, following its repossession from Sheila Grant (Sue Johnston). Frank later attends a funeral where he meets Lyn McLoughlin (Sharon Power). The pair form a close bond and begin a relationship, following the end of his marriage to Chrissy in 1991. Frank and Chrissy's children continue living at the house with him, although Sammy (Rachael Lindsay) moves out in 1992.

After Lyn becomes pregnant, the pair marry in November 1993. Frank drives to his wedding reception with Tony Dixon as a passenger - Frank offers Tony a lift to get him away from his feuding (separated) parents, Ron (Vince Earl) and DD (Irene Marot). Jimmy Corkhill is also driving, but while under the influence of cocaine. He causes Frank to swerve off the road and crash into a wall. Lyn, who was sitting in the back of the Rolls-Royce car, escaped uninjured, but Frank and Tony took the brunt of the impact. Frank dies shortly after reaching the hospital, and Tony is left in a coma. After Frank's funeral, it is revealed that the post-mortem showed him to be above the drink-drive limit. In Frank's will it states No.5, along with his savings, are to be split between his children and new wife. No.5 is eventually sold to Barry Grant (Paul Usher) in 1994 and the proceeds are split between Lyn, Sammy, Geoff (Stephen Walters) and Katie. Tony dies three months later, having never regained consciousness, and at his funeral, Jimmy confesses that he was the driver of the other car.

== Reception ==
Just before Brookside's demise in 2003, Frances Traynor from the Daily Record named the crash that caused Frank's death one of the show's "most controversial plotlines". A reporter from The Guardian branded Frank a "friendly trucker". A reporter from Inside Soap' branded the character Chrissy's "Neanderthal truck driver husband". Inside Soap ran a feature compiling "The 100 greatest soap stories ever told". They featured Frank's death storyline as their 79th choice. Mark Lawson from The Independent criticised Brookside for featuring too many dramatic stories in quick succession and included Frank's death. Francesca Babb from All About Soap included Frank's wedding day death in their "most memorable moments" of Brookside feature. Hilary Kingsley from Daily Mirror believed Frank should be awarded "the most embarrassing father of the decade". She chose an episode exploring his parenting skills in her "pick of the day" television feature.
