= Anthony Milner Lane =

British theoretical nuclear physicist (1928–2011)

Anthony Milner Lane FRS (1928–2011) was a leading theoretical nuclear physicist who had a career in the Theoretical Physics Division at the Atomic Energy and Research Establishment (AERE) at Harwell.

He was elected Fellow of the Royal Society in 1975.
