= Max Farnham =

Fictional character from Brookside

- Brookside character
- Portrayed by: Steven Pinder
- Duration: 1990–2003
- First appearance: 2 July 1990
- Last appearance: 25 May 2003
- Created by: Phil Redmond
In-universe information
- Wife: Susannah Morrisey (1983–1988, 1998–2000); Patricia Crosbie (1989–1993, 1993–1996); Jacqui Dixon (2001–present)
- Sons: Matthew Farnham; Thomas Farnham; Harry Farnham
- Daughters: Emily Farnham; Alice Farnham; Emma Farnham

Max Farnham is a fictional character from the British television soap opera Brookside, played by Steven Pinder. He made his first appearance during the episode broadcast on 2 July 1990. He remained in the show until just before it was cancelled in 2003.

== Development ==
In 1998, Pinder chose to leave Brookside after eight years. His decision was intended to be permanent, as he focused on securing new roles. He stated "When you're an actor, doing a soap can be very secure, particularly if you have a family to support, and one of the hardest things about acting is if you haven't got any work lined up in the immediate future. But I was a bit washed out and I thought the character had run its course. That's the actors' law – sometimes you've got to say no." On-screen, it emerged that Max had been having a long-running affair with a woman named Faye, which led to his wife Susannah Morrisey (Karen Drury) throwing him out. After being written out of the show, Pinder returned to the stage and starred in three theatre productions. In June 1999, he was asked to return to Brookside and he agreed to reprise his role. He was initially contracted for six months. Pinder admitted to being surprised by the offer, and was worried that others might see his return to the show "as a step back." Pinder was pleased with the changes the writers made to his character and felt that he and Max had been well rested. Drury was also glad about Pinder's return as she enjoyed working with him. She admitted that she was worried about her own future on the show when Pinder announced his decision to leave, but producer Phil Redmond reassured her that she would be kept on. Drury explained that Susannah "is bitter" upon Max's return to the Close, but she doubted Susannah would remain that way, adding "Max and Susannah will never be how they were before, but I think they will come to some sort of arrangement for the children."

Following the cancellation of Brookside in 2003, Pinder said "We should be celebrating the past of the programme in a positive way rather than a negative one because of all the things that Brookside has achieved over the past 20 years. I started off on the programme in 1990 and spent about 10 years playing Max, so I was there for a fair bit of time and I went through a lot of storylines. I had already left the programme when it was announced that the show was going to end but there had been a lot of speculation up until that point so it didn't come as a big surprise. It was a difficult time. They didn't really know what was happening with the storyline and it was quite sad when the programme moved to a different slot. Some of the actors complained, asking how the audience were expected to see the programme when the actors didn't even know when it was on but I had a great time working on the programme and still keep in touch with a lot of the present and past actors, such as Louis Emerick, who played Mick Johnson, and all three of my wives – Gabby Glaister (Patricia), Karen Drury (Susannah) and Alexandra Fletcher (Jacqui). When I made my decision to leave, the writing was on the wall. My part had diminished to virtually nothing. But during my time I loved working with Mick Starkey (Sinbad) and loved filming the bust-up scenes between the Farnhams and the Dixons." In closing, he added: "I haven't really watched any episodes of Brookside since I left because I have been working. But it was great working with so many people over such a long period of time. It was hard work but we had a lot of fun and it was a happy time."

== Storylines ==
Max Farnham arrives on Brookside Close with his wife, Patricia Farnham, and their son, Thomas. Max had previously been married to Susannah Farnham and had two children with her, Matthew and Emily. His marriage to Susannah had broken up as a result of his affair with Patricia. While Max is out in Florida to try to stop Susannah from taking their children to live out there with her new boyfriend, Andrew, Patricia's father, David, catches Max in bed with Susannah, and tells his daughter about what he has seen. Patricia starts divorce proceedings. Susannah goes back to Florida when Max refuses to pick her over Patricia. Max and Patricia later reconcile and get remarried just days after their divorce is finalised. Max and Patricia have a daughter named Alice, who has Down's Syndrome.

Susannah Farnham returns to Brookside after her relationship with Andrew ends badly in terms of finance, leaving her penniless. Susannah becomes intent on winning ex-husband Max back from his wife Patricia and destroying their reconciled marriage, trying to make him jealous by living with Max's business associate, Dil Palmer. The marriage finally breaks down completely when Max is falsely arrested for kerb crawling after he gets lost driving his car and stops to ask a nearby woman for directions, not realising she is a prostitute. Although Max is found innocent, Patricia refuses to believe him and leave the Close for France with their children, Thomas and Alice. Susannah is more than happy to support Max throughout the case and with her help, he is acquitted. Although Patricia eventually returns to try to make amends with Max after she learns of his acquittal, he walks out on her, remarking bitterly about her lack of support and that he still has feelings for Susannah. Weeks later, Patricia leaves the Close again and returns to France, this time for good, divorcing Max for the second time. Soon after, Max and Susannah rekindle their relationship.

Throughout his time on Brookside Close, Max has an ongoing feud with Ron Dixon, which starts when Ron puts up a fence. Max and Susannah's relationship is severely tested by the death of their children, Matthew and Emily, in a car crash. Susannah also finds it tough when Thomas and Alice briefly stay with their father. After being told she cannot have children again due to complications from the accident, Susannah, desperate for another child, is delighted when Jacqui Dixon agrees to be a surrogate for her and Max. The tough times made Max and Susannah's relationship stronger. Jacqui becomes pregnant, but Susannah also falls pregnant again, which leads to her and Jacqui falling out. Max and Ron's conflict escalates due to the surrogacy agreement. Max and Susannah marry for the second time, 10 years after their first marriage had ended in divorce. Jacqui gives birth to a son, Harry, while Susannah later gives birth to a daughter, Emma. Jacqui becomes concerned when Susannah is distraught on learning that one of her babies is ill, but she is clearly relieved that it is not Emma. Jacqui looks into the legal possibility of getting custody of Harry, and to bond with Max as he was equally concerned about Susannah's behaviour over Harry.

Max is discovered to have been having an affair with a woman named Faye for the previous 20 years. Susannah throws Max out and goes on to have affairs herself with three of the main characters, Greg Shadwick, Mick Johnson and Darren Roebuck. Max and Susannah later divorce. Susannah dies after a fall down the stairs. Although there are several people suspected of her murder, it emerges that Max was responsible, but indirectly as she had accidentally fallen down the stairs following an argument with him on the landing. Max marries Jacqui Dixon, the biological mother of his son, Harry. Max and Jacqui, along with Harry and Emma, leave Brookside to move to Woolton. Max and Jacqui sold their house to Jack Michaelson, a drug dealer who terrorised Brookside Close, until the other residents lynched him from the bedroom window.

== Reception ==
For his portrayal of Max, Pinder was nominated for the "Best Actor" accolade at the 1998 Inside Soap Awards. Vicky Spavin of the Daily Record dubbed Max "the hapless yuppie for whom one woman was never enough". The Sunday Mail's Steve Hendry called Max and Jacqui's relationship an "unlikely romance" and observed that it took "11 years, four marriages, one surrogate baby, an accidental killing and a kidnapping – not to mention a substantial age gap – but Cupid's arrow has finally found its mark." Hilary Kingsley and David Rowe writing for the Sunday Mirror branded Max as Patricia's "drippy husband". His confession to Patricia about his affair with Susannah was watched by 7 million viewers. In 2003, Frances Traynor from the Daily Record stated that Max and Susannah's argument and her subsequent death was one of the show's "most controversial plotlines". A critic from The Guardian included Max in an article ridiculing soap characters. Of Max they bemoaned "the plus points of a fairly great car crash episode were cancelled out by Max Farnham's endless (abysmal) soliloquies to Susannah's corpse or coffin: 'Can you hear me, Susannah?' (No.)" Geoffrey Phillips from the Evening Standard coined the term "Max Farnham Syndrome" is response to men having two separate families. Elaine Reilly from What to Watch branded Max a "wife killer", a "classic soap baddie" and a "love rat". Steven Russell from the East Anglian Daily Times branded Max a "puppyish" and "hapless chartered surveyor whose overstretched ambition and weakness at the hands of some quite assertive women got him into plenty of scrapes over a dozen years or so." Di Hollingsworth from Soaplife included Max killing Susannah in their list of top ten soap storylines in which characters get away with committing crimes. Francesca Babb from All About Soap included Max's kerb-crawling plot in their "most memorable moments" of Brookside feature. Recalling watching the story, she added "how we sniggered" and "the shame of it".
