= Vince Earl =

English singer, comedian and actor

- Born: Vincent Earl; 11 June 1944 (age 81); Birkenhead, Cheshire, England
- Years active: 1971–present

Vincent Earl (born 11 June 1944) is an English singer, comedian and actor most famous for his portrayal of the character Ron Dixon in the soap opera Brookside, a role which he played from 1990 until the show's demise in 2003.

== Early life and career ==
Earl was born on 11 June 1944 in Birkenhead, Cheshire. He started performing aged eleven, and he was involved in the Merseybeat scene of the 1960s as singer in his band Vince Earl and the Talismen. In 1964, Earl joined Rory Storm and the Hurricanes on tour and had a Number 1 hit in Texas with a version of America from West Side Story. He later formed Vince Earl & the Attractions, which became one of the top rated acts on the cabaret circuit. Earl made his television debut on New Faces in 1973, with his band The Vince Earl Attraction.

In 1981, Earl appeared in Play for Today and then in Boys from the Blackstuff as Jimmy Johnson the following year. In 1985, he appeared in No Surrender as Frank the heavy. Earl joined Brookside in 1990 playing Ron Dixon, until the soap's final episode in 2003.

In 2001, while still appearing in Brookside, Earl appeared on Lily Savage's Blankety Blank. He appeared in one episode of Doctors in 2004 and in 2006 appeared in an episode of the Director's Debut, titled 'The Lightning Kid', directed by Stephen Tompkinson.

After leaving Brookside, Earl performed as a stand-up comedian on cruise ships.

== Personal life ==
Earl lives with his second wife Irene (née Day) in Huntington, Chester. The couple, who married in the early 1970s, have four children; Stephen, Vince, Nicole and Kimberley.

In the summer of 2012, he successfully underwent a kidney transplant after his kidneys were damaged by Goodpasture’s syndrome, a rare auto-immune disease, in September 2010.

In 2020 Earl reunited with Sarah White, who played on screen wife Bev Dixon in Brookside, to record the single "You and Me (Were Meant to be Together)" from Paul Heaton and Jacqui Abbott's album Manchester Calling.
