= Peter Christian (actor) =

English actor

Peter Christian (born 14 August 1947 in Dingle, Liverpool) is an English actor best known for his roles on UK Television.

In 1983, he appeared in the original Liverpool Playhouse production of Willy Russell's Blood Brothers as Sammy, one of the older Johnston brothers. In 1985, he appeared in the last ever episode of Traveling, Man, starring Leigh Lawson, as one of Len Martin's henchmen.

On television he has appeared in the Channel 4 soap opera Brookside twice originally in 1982/1983 as Frank Blackburn, an associate of Gavin Taylor played by Danny Webb. And then again as Frank Rogers (from 1987 until the character was killed off in 1993), Boys from the Blackstuff, and Scully.
