= Bobby Grant (Brookside) =

Fictional character from the Channel 4 soap opera Brookside

- Brookside character
- Portrayed by: Ricky Tomlinson
- Duration: 1982–1988
- First appearance: 2 November 1982
- Last appearance: 10 May 1988
- Created by: Phil Redmond
- Crossover appearances: Hollyoaks (2025)
In-universe information
- Occupation: Factory craftsman Factory foreman Shop steward District secretary
- Wife: Sheila Grant (until 1989)
- Sons: Damon Grant
- Daughters: Karen Grant; Claire Grant
- Adoptive sons: Barry Grant
- Grandsons: Simon McGrath
- Uncles: Paddy; Brendan

Bobby Grant is a fictional character from the British Channel 4 soap opera Brookside, played by Ricky Tomlinson. One of the show's original characters, Bobby debuted on-screen during the show's first episode broadcast on 2 November 1982. Tomlinson attended a series of auditions in Liverpool after being invited by his friend Tony Scoggo. Various actors were invited back and auditioned in different groups to observe who worked well together. Bobby was cast by show creator and executive producer Phil Redmond and production team member Janet Goddard. The latter expressed her interest in Redmond meeting Tomlinson, as she believed him best suited to the role aesthetically. Tomlinson performed an improvised monologue in front of them to secure the role.

Bobby is portrayed as a staunch socialist and trade unionist. He is the patriarch of the Grant family, which originally consisted of Bobby, his wife Sheila Grant (Sue Johnston) and their children Barry Grant (Paul Usher), Damon Grant (Simon O'Brien) and Karen Grant (Shelagh O'Hara). His characterisation is etched into his working-class background. When the series starts, the Grants have moved from a council housing estate to Brookside Close, where they own their own home. This was a contradiction to Bobby's socialist characterisation and he feels remorse for betraying his working-class background.

Much of Bobby's dialogue and political storylines were written by Jimmy McGovern. He enjoyed writing for Bobby and often expressed his own leftist views via the character. Bobby featured in Brookside during the early 1980s, a time British politics were right-leaning and feminist groups were popularised. McGovern stated that this challenged Bobby's stories and made the character feel under attack from different institutions. His early stories revolved around his career at Fairbanks Engineering and involvement in a trade union. Bobby attempts to save jobs by leading an industrial strike. He is later promoted to a foreman role but the company is closed down regardless. Writers used Bobby's leadership characteristics to propel him forward in the series, following a bout of unemployment and his subsequent appointment to district secretary. Other storylines for the character include exploring Sheila's geriatric pregnancy and later in life fatherhood to Claire Grant. He also has a vasectomy in a privatised hospital, which writers used to play him at odds with his Catholic religion and support for the welfare state.

Tomlinson left Brookside abruptly in 1988 following disillusionment regarding Bobby's changing characterisation. A series of disagreements regarding contracts and writers' changing attitude towards Bobby culminated in Tomlinson walking off set. The dispute was widely publicised. Tomlinson and McGovern claimed that management were already planning to terminate his contract. Three months of storylines originally intended to feature Bobby were rewritten. Production were puzzled by his departure and decided to convey their own feelings via writing Bobby's departure. He disappears midway through an episode, leaving Sheila feeling the same about her husband's sudden departure. Redmond later recalled his regret had not acted differently to change Tomlinson's mind. He noted that failings to consult Tomlinson on changing Bobby's characterisation during the aftermath of Sheila's rape played into his decision to leave.

Bobby is one of Brookside's most iconic characters and his trade unionism has generated numerous positive reviews from television critics and authors. Tomlinson's portrayal and McGovern's writing has also garnered positive comment. The on-screen partnership between Bobby and Sheila proved favourable with critics and viewers alike. Bobby's later characterisation found criticism from journalists who believed Bobby abused alcohol and behaved like a bully.

== Creation and casting ==
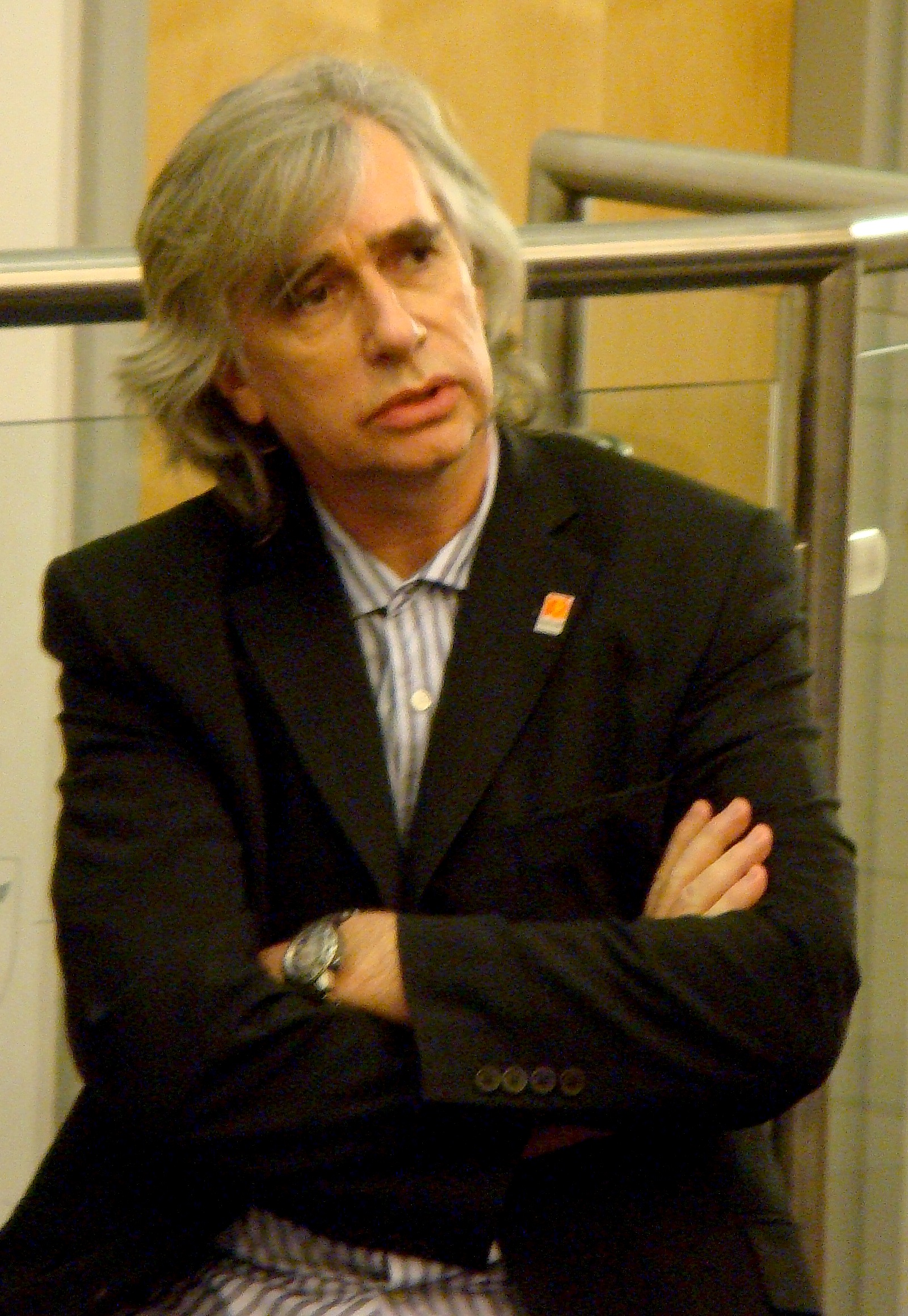
Brookside executive producer Phil Redmond created Bobby and cast Tomlinson.

In March 1982, eight months prior to Brookside's television debut, Brookside's creator and Executive producer, Phil Redmond revealed details about the show in an interview with Roy West from Liverpool Echo. He named a selection of characters he envisioned appearing in the series and named Bobby Grant. Actor Ricky Tomlinson learned about auditions for Brookside from his friend Tony Scoggo, who invited him along. Scoggo also auditioned to play Bobby but was later cast of Bobby's best friend, Matty Nolan. Redmond was looking for someone with trade unionist experience to play Bobby, which Tomlinson had.

In his autobiography, Tomlinson recalled attending his first casting session in Liverpool. Tomlinson was paired with actress Eileen O'Brien and asked to improvise a scene about shopping in a supermarket. He recalled more than 300 other hopefuls auditioning and he faced some "pretty strong opposition". Tomlinson recalled receiving a backhanded compliment from Redmond. After the audition O'Brien stated her belief that Tomlinson had secured the role but she had not. Tomlinson was called back for a second audition and this time was given a new scene partner, Sue Johnston, who would eventually be cast as Bobby's wife, Sheila Grant. A report in the Daily Post revealed Tomlinson was one of thirty candidates who auditioned to play Bobby.

Bobby is one of Brookside's original characters and all actors playing these roles were cast by Redmond and production team member Janet Goddard. In the initial casting process, Goddard was keen for Redmond to meet with Tomlinson. She believed that Tomlinson was ideal for the role judged on appearance alone. Brookside writer Andy Lynch had also watched Tomlinson in a theatre production and wanted him to be cast as Bobby. Tomlinson was an ideal candidate because he had already gained an actors equity card. Redmond recalled that upon first meeting Tomlinson, he thought he was perfectly suited to his own ideas of who Bobby should be. Tomlinson attended wearing his working clothes and thought his attire could have ruined his chance of success. However, Redmond liked Tomlinson's attire and explained that "he looked like Bobby Grant should look with his unkempt hair, beard, and what from memory I think was the classic working-class attire of a donkey-jacket."

Redmond conversed with Tomlinson and gave him Bobby's backstory and characterisation a trade unionist official. Redmond then asked Tomlinson to perform his improvisation skills. Tomlinson was given the context of a scene that would feature Bobby missing his family Christmas lunch in favour of a union meeting on Christmas Day. He then began to perform a monologue in front of Redmond and Goddard detailing his love and respect for his wife and how he did not want to let them down. Tomlinson continued to detail how the union meeting was of greater importance to secure his family's future. After Tomlinson finished, they complimented his performance and sent him away. Redmond recalled being "transfixed" by the performance and that he and Goddard quickly agreed that Tomlinson should receive the role. They chose not to inform him immediately because they wanted to cast Bobby's wife first. Redmond also recalled that unlike other actors auditioning for the role, Tomlinson remained calm and casual during his audition.

Redmond began workshopping the original cast, to see which actors built a rapport and could work well together on-screen. Johnston was informed in advance of other cast members that she had secured a role but remained unaware as to which character she would play. All successful actors were invited to another audition on the Brookside set to perform improvisations in familial groups. Tomlinson, Johnston, Joe McGann, Simon O'Brien and Shelagh O'Hara were grouped together and informed they were successful and would portray the Grant family. Writers created Bobby as the patriarch of the Grant family. It originally consisted of Bobby, his wife of twenty-four years Sheila (Johnston) and their two sons Barry Grant (McGann) and Damon Grant (O'Brien), and their daughter, Karen Grant (O'Hara). McGann was refused an actors equity card and producers had to recast the role with Paul Usher.

Tomlinson had limited acting experience whilst at school and later worked in the construction industry. Like his character, Tomlinson was a flying picket and trade-unionist. He had been charged with conspiracy following a building industry workers dispute, where the case was dubbed the Shrewsbury Two and spent two years in prison. From his own experiences with work place disputes, Tomlinson was able to draw a parallel between his and Bobby's lives. This shared experience aided his portrayal of Bobby. Johnston recalled Tomlinson's identity during auditions because she took part in a nationwide protest to free him. Redmond was unaware of Tomlinson's involvement in the union strikes during the casting process and only found out when the programme was transmitted. The show received some telephone calls for Tomlinson to be removed from the show and he was branded a "Marxist agitator". When Redmond learned the extent of Tomlinson's past he fully understood why he resonated so well with Bobby's characterisation. Redmond claimed had he have known, he still would have cast Tomlinson. Channel 4 executives took a similar stance and supported the casting. Brookside had a stance of left-wing politics and portrays with social issues in depth. Speaking of his involvement, Tomlinson stated "I wouldn't be doing this if it didn't face issues. People are going to find themselves confronted with all kinds of things that they never expect to see on Coronation Street".

On 2 October 1982, ahead of Brookside's television debut a report in the Sunday Mirror publicised Tomlinson's casting. On 5 October 1982, Tomlinson's role as Bobby was announced alongside the casting of the show's other original characters. Geoff Baker from Birmingham Mail revealed that Bobby would be the head of the Grants, a Catholic family who have "socialist roots". Of his casting, Tomlinson told Baker that "there is very little difference between me and Bobby." Ken Irwin from the Daily Mirror reported that the Grants would be "practising Catholics and readers of the Daily Mirror" who move to Brookside Close from a council housing estate. The cast of Brookside watched the first episode debut on Channel 4 at a party in Liverpool. Tomlinson told Roy West from Liverpool Echo that "I was concentrating too much on my performance, looking for ways it could be improved." Bobby was the first main character to appear and deliver dialogue in Brookside's first episode and was used to open the show's storyline.

== Development ==
=== Characterisation ===
==== Trade unionism and appearance ====
"The Grant family was the focal point of the show in the early days. Bobby was a typically working-class guy who had moved his family on to a middle-class estate in the hope of bettering their lot. He was a shop steward and later became a full-time official of the union."

— Tomlinson on Bobby's role in the show. (2004)

Bobby is portrayed as a trade-unionist and a socialist. His characterisation is etched into his working-class background and his family affect his stories. In the book, Brookside: The Official Companion, show creator Phil Redmond detailed of how his marriage to Sheila shapes his on-screen behaviour. Bobby and his family move from a council estate to Brookside Close to take ownership of a house. Redmond believed this was at odd's with Bobby's characterisation. He noted it was such a contradiction that Bobby tells his close friends it was solely Sheila's idea to move to a higher class area. Moving from the council estate made Bobby feel like he was betraying the British working class society he had long been a part of. However, Bobby was not as opposed to the move as he made out. He did want a better house for his family. He was also proud to give Sheila what she wanted from life for a change. Bobby is a "staunch socialist" and Sheila is portrayed as a staunch Catholic. Redmond added that "big man" Bobby has a "tendency to dramatise his life." Writers often portrayed Bobby working at the Fairbanks Engineering plant. In his backstory, Bobby had worked at Fairbanks for more than twenty-five years and was aged in his late forties when the show began. Redmond stated that Bobby "makes a meal" of the job and always brings his work life problems home and bothers his family with his career issues.

In an introductory character profile published in TVTimes, Bobby was described by writer Alan Kennaugh as being a "militant trade unionist" who is "affable and fair-minded". He added that Bobby is a "well paid production worker, a socialist by background rather than political persuasion. He has lived 20 years on a nearby council estate and is proud of his new house at Brookside." In the book, "Total Brookside: The Ultimate Guide to the Ultimate Soap", author Geoff Tibballs described Bobby as a "big bear of a man" who spent most of his time being "grizzly". Tibballs assessed that Bobby was always "invariably angry about something" which was often linked to his "strong trade union principles" being offended. He is a "crusader" for the cause, wears "his heart on his sleeve" and "likes to take the moral high ground." Bobby was also stubborn and if forced to compromise, he would never acknowledge it. Bobby and Tomlinson are quite similar in personality and appearance. He described their main difference is that Bobby is a serious character, and Tomlinson is more comical. On their likeness, he told John Kercher from Soaps that "there are a lot of similarities that help make this series so genuine, Bobby is a strong union man with heavy feelings in that area and I know just what that is like. I identify so much with him that he could be me." Tomlinson described Bobby's attire as "scruffy old clothes". Tomlinson often confused Brookside viewers while seen in public because of his attire. He added "the clothes that Bobby wears for Brookside are the same ones I wear in the streets for myself. People look at me and think I'm still in some kind of costume, but Bobby's gear is mine!" He wore Bobby's clothes outside of work and even during interviews.

Bobby's trade-unionist story ran throughout his first year in the series. He alongside his best friends, Matty Nolan and Jonah Jones (Tom Branch) fight to save jobs. Bobby's strike actions cause problems for the Grants. A loss of income is coupled with other character's criticising his actions. This is displayed in an early scene in which Sheila is berated in the shop she works in because of Bobby. Bobby is later promoted to a foreman and shop steward role within Fairbanks. In episodes broadcast in 1983, they were depicted fighting to save the entire plant from closure. By November's episodes the factory was closed down and Bobby forced to sign on the dole. Writers portrayed the Grant's as unlucky in their careers as in the first two years of the series Sheila, Bobby and Barry all lose their jobs. Tibballs believed that during Bobby's unemployment, he was "shattered" because he had "thrived on hard work" and was left without life goals. Tomlinson revealed that Bobby's unemployment story resonated with viewers. He recalled learning that a real-life couple watched the episode and cried when they realised they too were facing the same issues.

Writers' characterisation of Bobby made him a resilient figure. It was Bobby's skills shown in the trade-union and leadership skills at Fairbanks that saved the Grant family from financial ruin as he secures work as a district secretary. Bobby's new role allows him to represent the rights of a more diverse community. This is explored during an August 1987 storyline in which Bobby represents a HIV positive worker, Stan McHugh (Ian Bleasdale), who loses his job. Bobby wants to help Stan but he doubts Bobby's determination. To prove his sincerity, Bobby invites Stan to dine at his home. Stan's story was the first time a television series had featured an AIDS related storyline. The storyline was not sensational and was self-contained. Additional scenes explored Sheila's reaction to Stan's illness and her worries that the HIV virus could possibly be transmitted to her daughter Claire. Sheila has to overcome her fear and support him like Bobby does.

==== Writers input ====
Bobby's political views sometimes represented scriptwriter's personal views. One example being Jimmy McGovern, who was critical about the sinking of the ARA General Belgrano during the Falklands War by the Royal Navy. McGovern believed it was a ploy to get the British public to vote for the Conservative Party in the following general election. In one of McGovern's episodes, Bobby delivers a speech about the event being a ploy to keep Conservative power and close down British industries in Northern England. This speech was appropriate for Bobby's trade unionist persona. Many of McGovern's own views and Labour values were dispensed in scripts for Bobby.

Explaining why he used Bobby as his mouthpiece, McGovern told author Sean Day-Lewis that Tomlinson shared his political attitude and "I could express my ideas". He further explained that "I could use him for a lot of what I wanted to say" because the actor and character eventually merged. McGovern found writing for Bobby challenging because of the era that British politics were evolving in. He stated that he imagined the character as a "decent, hard-working, compassionate man seemingly under attack from all quarters." McGovern believed that the leftist Bobby faced issues of judgement from general politics that were becoming right-wing, feminist movements and even suggested a racial issue. McGovern stated that for "a man, a working class white man. Because he was white he was seen by a lot of people as part of another problem, the problem of the oppression of black people." McGovern added "I'm sure that's the way he saw himself because that's the way I saw myself then."

Tomlinson assessed that towards the end of his portrayal, Bobby had changed beyond recognition. He thought writers struggled to keep Bobby authentic in his characterisation. He described Bobby as once a "passionate, hard-working trade union official, flawed but basically a decent bloke." Over five years, Tomlinson believed Bobby's "reputation took a bit of a bashing with a marital rape and a drinking problem." Tomlinson described Bobby as almost corrupt as he "sells out his mates and his class". Tomlinson made his feelings known to writers but chose not to challenge them any further. Tomlinson blamed writers for negatively impacting Bobby characterisation, which resulted in the character's departure.

=== Marriage to Sheila Grant ===
==== Early years ====
The Grant marriage was a significant part of Bobby's characterisation. In one storyline, he and Sheila are forced to deal with another pregnancy which would conclude with the birth of their fourth child, Claire Grant. While filming Claire's birth, Johnston acted out Sheila's labour. She and Tomlinson wanted to capture genuine emotion and forcefully pulled Tomlinson's hair so it appeared authentic. Tomlinson told Andrew Knight from Evening Express that "for the sake of realism you can't bluff anger or tenderness. It's the only company operating today where everything's for real." Tomlinson recalled that he had no personal experience to bring to the birth scenes. He surprised himself with how realistic it appeared on-screen. Portraying the emotional fatherhood was challenging for Tomlinson but he used his past experiences to aid his portrayal. In one scene, Bobby becomes tearful while getting to know his new daughter. Tomlinson told Maureen Cozens from Sunday Sun that he recalled the struggle for his wife to get pregnant and meeting his own first child, helped him become emotional during filming. Tomlinson and his wife had their third child later in life and this experience also helped him add authenticity to the character.

Fiction and reality blurred when Tomlinson was visiting his wife in hospital. Nurses at the hospital heckled Tomlinson asking about the child's gender and how Sheila was feeling. Viewers also harassed Johnston about the baby's eventual name and sent gifts to the set. The baby storyline generated press interest, Peter Reece from The People wrote a news article including photographs of the Grants with Claire filming her Christening. Brookside production concealed the child's identity, referring to her as "little miss X" to protect her family's privacy. The story developed with Sheila becoming depressed after Claire's birth and Bobby responds by bringing home more work. Sheila's depression also creates domestic disputes which test the Grant's marriage. Johnston liked the story and told Peter McGarry from Coventry Telegraph that "as actors we couldn't ask for better material."

In another storyline, Bobby gets involved in a dispute with his neighbour, Paul Collins (Jim Wiggins), over the company Petrochem. Bobby's behaviour in his renewed career forces change. Redmond wrote that it transformed the character, who was now making himself look more presentable. His work also bothers Sheila, who presumes Bobby is having an affair when he accompanies his colleague, Janet Hanson (Cheryl Kennedy) on a business trip.

Writers also explored the issue of a vasectomy procedure and it was another example of them portraying him at odds with his socialist persona. Sheila's pregnancy shocks Bobby and he attempts to have the operation done on the NHS. Bobby is blocked from having it done because he legally requires Sheila's consent. Bobby knows that Sheila's Catholicism would prevent it from happening. Bobby then pays to have the procedure done at a private hospital in secret. This contradicts Bobby's characterisation and support of the British welfare state. Writers highlighted this on-screen, when Sheila discovers the truth, she accuses him of being a hypocrite and violating his own morals. She also cannot believe that he would pay for private care and go against their shared religious values. The scene included Sheila hitting Bobby in the crotch with a ladder in retaliation. The stunt was performed for real and Tomlinson was supposed to have a protective box fitted to protect his testicles. The wardrobe department were unable to locate it and Tomlinson instead wore elbow padding. When Johnston hit Tomlinson, the pain was so agonising that Tomlinson rolled up and swore. Producers wanted Tomlinson to refilm the scene due to his expletives but he refused and the scene had to be edited.

==== Marriage breakdown ====
Their marriage is later tested when Sheila is raped by a taxi-driver. Bobby's best friend Matty is made a suspect and it causes trouble in all their personal lives. Sheila struggles to overcome her ordeal and on the advice of a priest, she is encouraged to take a pilgrimage to the Vatican to recover from her ordeal. Bobby refuses and states they cannot afford. Sheila takes a job in a pub to help raise the funds needed. Matty also tries to convince Bobby to go with her, but this only annoys. Writers depicted Bobby feeling alienated and as though everyone is dismissing his feelings on the matter. The arguments between Bobby and Sheila continue. Tomlinson told Ken Irwin from Daily Mirror that "we've been through some amazingly harrowing scenes, fighting like cat and dog. It's been hard stuff to play in front of the cameras." Despite Bobby being nasty to Sheila following her ordeal, viewers sympathised with him too. Tomlinson revealed the majority of his fan mail supported his character and some viewers suggested he should leave Sheila.

To conclude the storyline, producers created special episodes filmed in Rome and The Vatican, featuring Sheila attempting to reconnect with her Catholic faith. Bobby joins her on the trip and they realise they still love each other. The duo decide work out their problems and plan for their future. Brookside sent sixteen of their crew to Rome film the episodes. The production had to gain special permission to film in St Peter's Square. In one scene, the film crew managed to film with Pope John Paul II on his balcony in the background. The camera angle made it appear as though the Pope was waving in Bobby and Sheila's direction. A Catholic priest, Kevin McNamara joined the crew on filming to document the trip and offer advice on portraying authentic Catholicism in scenes. McNamara was criticised by some Catholics in his community for helping a show that portrayed rape and gay characters. The story caused controversy due to cast and crew behaviour. Hotel guests complained to the British press, alleging the film crew were drunken and disorderly at night. Prior to the Rome episodes being broadcast, Tomlinson and Johnston appeared on BBC's Open Air programme. Tomlinson accidentally told the presenter Eamonn Holmes details about the storyline's outcome. A report in the Daily Record claimed that producers were annoyed with Tomlinson for providing spoilers.

Writers also portrayed Bobby at odd's with his presumed son, Barry, which was often used as a source of contention in the Grant marriage. Sheila's bond with Barry was stronger than Bobby's. This inevitably caused issues between them. When they communicate in scenes it usually ends in conflict. Barry could not understand his father's obsessions with politics and unions. In turn, Bobby failed to grasp by his son was a layabout and uninterested in his views. In a later storyline, it is revealed that Bobby's best friend, Matty is Barry's biological father.

Writers planned for Sheila to further her education and study at college. Johnston believed the story was positive and portrayed Sheila turning her attentions towards bettering herself. She also thought it was the beginning of the end for the Grant's marriage. She wrote in her autobiography that the story "drove a wedge between Sheila and Bobby" and did the same to herself and Tomlinson. She explained that it transformed their character's personalities and she and Tomlinson both reacted in different ways. The Grant marriage was tested again following the murder of their son, Damon, who is stabbed to death in York. Sheila becomes attached to Damon's girlfriend, Debbie McGrath (Gillian Kearney). Bobby looks for someone to blame and chooses Debbie. In the aftermath of Damon's death, writers created a downward spiral story for Bobby. He begins drinking alcohol often and loses his driving license. In other scenes, Bobby forces himself on Sheila who rebuffs his advances. He also rages against Barry, who leaves their home. Sheila blames Bobby for forcing their only remaining son out of the family. Sheila decides to go to marriage counselling alone, thinking it will solve their problems. Bobby meanwhile puts his money into a strike fund to support apprentices at the Bishop and Wardle company. Sheila is shocked to learn Bobby is taking part in industrial action once again. He in turn is annoyed with Sheila for lying about going to marriage counselling.

Writers planned the complete break-up of the Grant's marriage. Bobby tries to prevent Sheila going on a night out with Kathy Roach (Noreen Kershaw) by leaving the house so that she has to look after Claire. Billy Corkhill (John McArdle) agrees to mind Claire while Sheila and Kathy go out. They meet Stephen (Steve Halliwell) and Greg (Ian Liston) while out drinking and when they return to the Corkhill's, they find Billy asleep on the sofa. They continue to drink and place a bow in a Billy's hair. Unbeknownst to them, Stephen and Greg follow them home and harass them. The commotion attracts Bobby's attention who rushes to confront them, but Billy's front door window gets smashed in the process. When he asks Sheila for an explanation she laughs at Billy's hair bow which infuriates Bobby, who then slaps her and humiliates her in front of Kathy and Billy.

Scriptwriters decided to make the scenes both comedic and dramatic. The comedy ends with Bobby slapping Sheila, and was done to change the mood of the episode instantly. The slap scene was also designed to be "shocking", "highly effective" moment to mark the end of the Grant's marriage. In the book, Phil Redmond's 20 Years of Brookside, Graham Kibble-White described it as the "climax in the slow deterioration of what had previously been Brookside's most solid relationship." Brookside allowed actors to perform violent scenes authentically. If a physical altercation involved a slap or a struggle, actors would actually perform these stunts for real. Tomlinson later confirmed they would often their own stunts in scenes requiring physical contact, stating "we did everything for real. I'd yank her hair out and she'd give me a good slapping." Ken Horn directed the episode and promised Johnston the altercation would be filmed in one take because it involved Bobby striking Sheila. During filming, Johnston's earring was knocked from her ear when Tomlinson made contact with her. Having already filmed scenes prior and following the altercation, they had to refilm the scene for continuity reasons.

The story continues with Sheila paying to have Billy's door fixed, Bobby again smashes Billy's door windows causing a further rift on Brookside Close. Bobby later tries to explain he invested in the apprenticeship action to honour Damon's memory. Sheila believes it is too late to repair the damage to their marriage and Bobby leaves his family behind. One of Bobby's final successful storylines was him being breathalysed for drink driving. The story, which was mirrored in other soap operas at the time was credited by police for a reduction of drink driving incidents over Christmas 1987.

=== Departure ===
==== Disputes and role abandonment ====
"I have not been happy for some time now about the way the character of Bobby is going. As far as I'm concerned they can send Bobby to America - or even to the moon. But if they try and make him do anything which betrays the working class I won't be playing the part."

— Tomlinson on filming Bobby's final scenes following his abrupt departure. (1988)

Tomlinson's departure was unexpected. Two years prior, in 1986, Redmond stated that he envisioned the Grant family always being in Brookside. He stated that many of the show's characters come to the end of their natural life span. However, Redmond confirmed "a family like the Grants are very stable and you'd expect them to spend the rest of their lives there." In August 1987, Redmond planned to revamp the show and refocus on younger characters. O'Hara and O'Brien had both left their roles as Karen and Damon, leaving Bobby and Sheila as an ageing couple with their youngest child, Claire. Redmond introduced the Rogers family to replace the role of the Grants but remained committed to their predecessors. Redmond told Roy West from Liverpool Echo that scriptwriters were planning out Bobby and Sheila's future on Brookside. Unlike other original characters, the Grants achieved longevity. Tomlinson believed their success was because the characters cared about each other and the actors did not attempt to outperform each other.

Tomlinson's departure occurred following some disagreements over storylines and Bobby's characterisation. His departure was unplanned and abrupt for the production team. Tomlinson wanted to remain on Brookside but a series of events that occurred in early 1988 lead to his departure. In his autobiography, Tomlinson recalled that Redmond hosted a Christmas party that he was not invited to. Tomlinson discovered that Johnston and Bill Dean who plays Harry Cross attended in secrecy. Tomlinson stated that he was upset with Johnston and Dean became teary-eyed when confronted about the betrayal. Johnston believed she was put in an awkward situation by Redmond. Writer Jimmy McGovern advised Tomlinson to alter his behaviour. When his usual twelve-month contract was up for renewal, Dorothy Andrews revealed that production were offering him a three-month contract instead. Tomlinson refused and told Andrews he would leave immediately. She was shocked and tried to convince him to re-sign. Tomlinson believed that Redmond no longer wanted him in the series but did not want Bobby to leave suddenly. Tomlinson later agreed to stay for nine months to give Bobby an authentic departure story. It was soon reported in the British press that Tomlinson would leave in June 1988, following the expiration of his contract.

In April 1988, another on-set dispute caused Tomlinson's abrupt departure. Tomlinson believed that Bobby had been demonised as a "boozer, a whinger and a dinosaur". A Brookside storyline featuring Bobby's daughter Karen moving in with her boyfriend whilst at university caused a major disagreement between Tomlinson and the writers. Tomlinson took issue with Bobby's reaction to his daughter's new living arrangements. Sheila, a devout Catholic was more likely to take issue with Karen's choice but writers decided to portray Bobby taking issue. Tomlinson asked why Bobby, "a left-wing firebrand trade unionist" would care about his daughter having premarital sex and would want her to be happy. Writers refused to change the scripts and Tomlinson walked off set and returned home. Johnston recalled that Tomlinson "saw red" at the scripts and she had agreed with him. She stated that Sheila should have been concerned and questioned why Bobby would care about Karen's living arrangements because Bobby "had been a left-wing unionist all his life".

Tabloid newspapers took interest in Tomlinson's departure. Brookside publicity department claimed they were unable to make contact with the actor but would continue filming. Tomlinson claimed that Redmond was absent from set when he walked. Tomlinson met with Redmond for a crisis meeting, which failed to reach any resolve. He added that had McGovern continued to solely write for his character, the issue could have been resolved. Tomlinson later telephoned a director, Norman Foster and informed him he would return to the set for a final day to film Bobby's final scenes but nothing more. Tomlinson's abrupt departure left production with a challenge to write Bobby out of Brookside authentically. However, it became easy once they realised that they could merge reality and fiction. The production team felt puzzlement and left with numerous unanswered questions over Tomlinson's departure. They decided Sheila's reaction would be the same and had him disappear during an episode midway through. The story played out with Sheila shocked and confused as to why Bobby has suddenly left her. After his departure, three months of scripts had to be rewritten that were originally intended to feature Bobby. These changes cost the production an undisclosed sum of money, though was estimated to be in the thousands.

==== Impact on Brookside's legacy ====
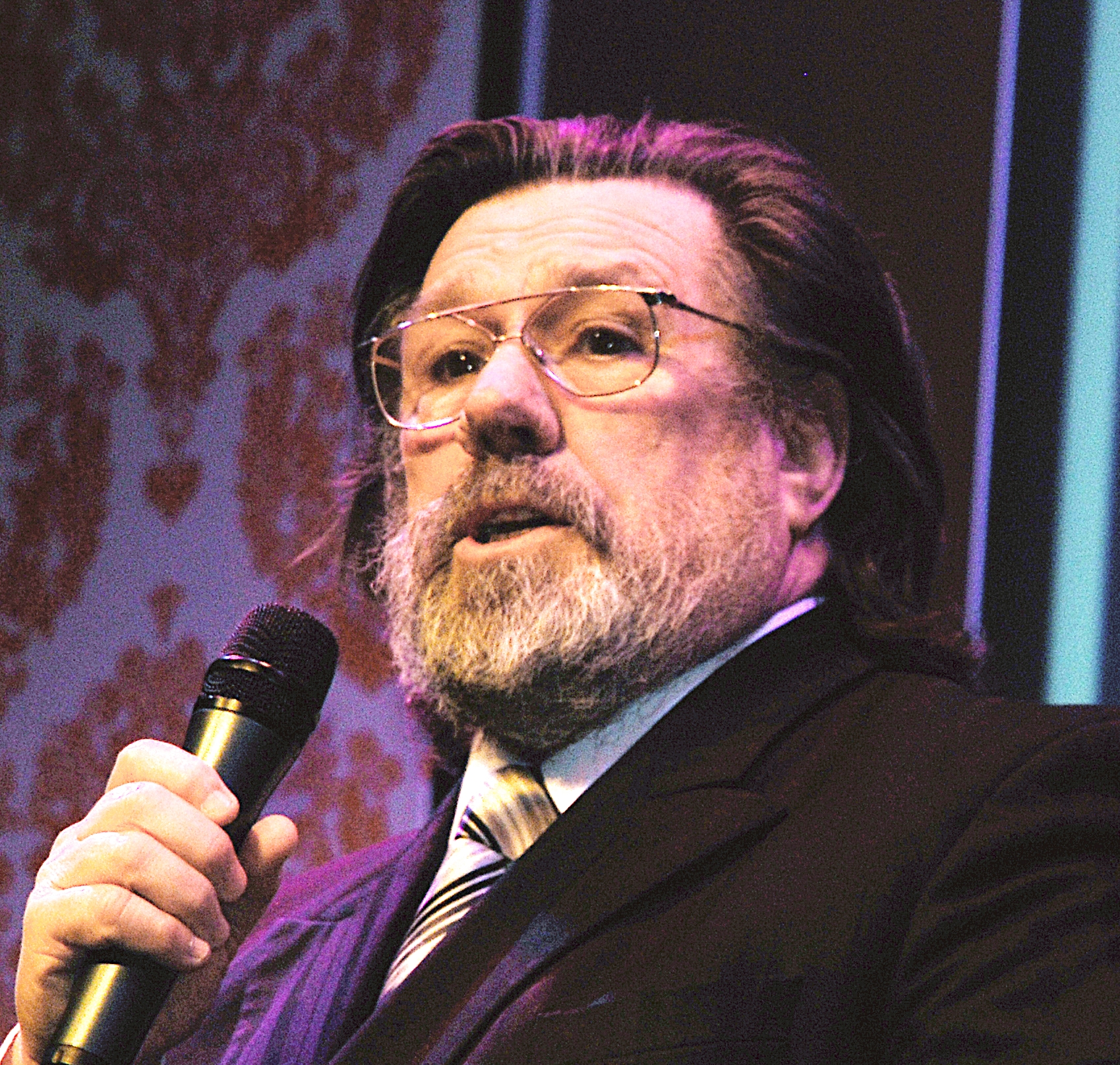
Ricky Tomlinson walked off-set after a dispute with Brookside's production.

Jimmy McGovern revealed that Brookside's management wanted to write Tomlinson out of the series. He claimed that Tomlinson's "face didn't fit for some reason, I never did get to the bottom of it." McGovern was keen to support Tomlinson and at a story conference he threatened to quit if management went ahead and fired Tomlinson. McGovern did not quit because Tomlinson walked out and believed it gave him reason to remain. McGovern later revealed that he regretted not leaving then and always had felt guilty. McGovern added "those contractual problems could have been solved if Phil had wanted to that. It was diabolical, a fascinating character was needlessly lost."

Redmond later revealed in his autobiography titled "Midterm Report" that tension had been building between Tomlinson and production over the direction Bobby's characterisation was being developed. Redmond wanted to explore the politics of the trade unions movement. This clashed with some of Tomlinson's strict personal views, which Redmond believed to be one factor in Tomlinson's disillusions with the show. The other was Bobby's development following Sheila's rape story. Tomlinson was unhappy with the writers development of Bobby and believed they focused too much on how it affected Sheila. Redmond believed that production did not invest their time discussing with Tomlinson about how Sheila's rape would change Bobby's characterisation. Redmond recalled discussing it at length with Johnston and not Tomlinson. Redmond assessed that this meant they never got Tomlinson's approval to drastically change Bobby's persona.

Those involved in Tomlinson's departure later reassessed the situation. Redmond regretted his treatment of Tomlinson and the manner of his departure. Redmond believed that after Tomlinson's departure, Brookside went through a rejuvenation process. Tomlinson later assessed that the fault lay with writers and not Redmond. In an interview with Roy West from Liverpool Echo, Tomlinson said that in Bobby's final episodes writers made Bobby a villain in his violent treatment of Sheila. He believed it would have only intensified had he stayed. Brookside producer Vanessa Whitburn, who took over in July 1988, believed Tomlinson's departure was positive because it produced an "enormous storyline". Johnston believed that Tomlinson's departure affected Sheila's future on the show. She wrote that "I didn't feel that the character of Sheila was ever really right once Bobby had gone." In 2003, Tomlinson recalled his departure stating "they were making my character into a whinging, cringing bit of a drunk. I walked off the set in the middle of my contract."

== In popular culture ==
Bobby and Sheila were impersonated by Ted Robbins and Kate Robbins on their 1987 ITV comedy show Kate and Ted’s Show, in a sketch that lampooned Brookside and its Liverpudlian characters called "Brewksyde". Bobby has been profiled and his storylines analysed in numerous print books. In 2023, Tomlinson returned to Brookside Close to film a scene in character as Bobby for the Eurovision Song Contest 2023, which was being held in Liverpool on behalf of Ukraine. The footage was used in a montage video welcoming Eurovision viewers to Liverpool. Bobby can be seen on Brookside Close hanging up Ukraine flags outside the house previously used as the Grant family home.

== Reception ==
=== Newspaper and online praise ===
A writer from Boom FM called Bobby an "iconic role". Helen Fear from Entertainment Daily branded Bobby as one of the most iconic characters to live on Brookside Close. John Plunkett from The Guardian branded the character a "militant trade union official". A Chester Chronicle reporter branded him a "shop steward". A writer from The Guide Liverpool believed that Bobby was "played superbly" by Tomlinson and Bobby "won legions of fans with his socialist and trade-union activist ways." They assessed that Bobby had many forms of heartbreak in his six-year tenure. They added "if there was ever a Scouse dad character we could all relate to, it’s got to be Bobby Grant." Ian Brandes from Sunday Mirror branded Bobby a "tough-talking shop steward." Danny Buckland (Liverpool Echo) branded Bobby a "loving husband". Sam Fuller of The Press and Journal labelled the character "down-to-earth pro-union Bobby".

Jess Molyneux from Liverpool Echo wrote that Tomlinson was "loved" for playing Bobby and that the Grant family were included in many of the show's most memorable storylines. The Daily Mirror's Jane Lavender and Sophie McCoid opined that Tomlinson was one of the show's "stars" and his character's "antics kept viewers gripped." They added "Bobby was at the centre of some of the biggest early storylines."

Brian Viner from The Independent believed that Tomlinson's portrayal of Bobby was unforgettable, writing "to some people, his alter ego will forever remain Bobby Grant, the bolshie but principled shop steward." A representative from the Liverpool City Council branded Bobby as one of Tomlinson's "most memorable" roles. A writer from The Northern Echo averred that Tomlinson had "made audiences laugh and cry with his portrayal of working class characters" such as "bolshie shop steward Bobby".

The Sunday Sun's Maureen Cozens described Bobby as "a tough union man with a heart of gold" and "a tough guy with a lot of bottle" Andrew Knight from Evening Express praised Tomlinson's performance stating that the actor spoke with "the same spirited scouse commitment that viewers associate with his screen counterpart." He added that Tomlinson had "wholehearted" belief in his character. Peter Robson from The Press and Journal and a Hull Daily Mail reporter branded Bobby as the show's "rough diamond" character. A Liverpool Echo columnist branded him a "gritty union chief" who helped steer the Grant family through Sheila's rape crisis. Ken Irwin from Daily Mirror branded Bobby a "tough trade union leader" and thought it was ironic that Tomlinson portrayed him. David Stuckey and Len Capeling from Daily Post quipped that when Bobby faces trouble on the picket line, it was "an irony presumably not lost on Tomlinson".

The pairing of Bobby and Sheila was also popular with critics. A writer from Heart radio included Bobby and Sheila in their "iconic TV soap couples" feature. They added that Sheila and her "socialist husband Bobby worked hard and supported one another, until it broke up in the late 1980s." Elaine O'Brien (Derby Telegraph) said there was "never a dull moment in the Grant household, led by union man Bobby and his wife Sheila." Ken Irwin (Daily Mirror) stated that Bobby and Sheila as one of the show's longstanding successful couples and opined they were "the stuff that made Britain great." Moira Martingale from Liverpool Echo chose Bobby and Sheila's visit to Rome in their "pick of the day" feature.

In 1998, Tomlinson and Johnston were cast as another married couple, Jim and Barbara Royle and in the sitcom The Royle Family. This regenerated discussion of the Grants and comparisons were made. The Guardian's Paul Flynn believed that "Sheila and Bobby Grant embodied enough of a new national mum and dad archetype" to see the actors receive honour castings. Katy Brent from Closer included Bobby and Sheila as a reason Brookside made "totally brilliant telly" and branded them "Brookside legends". Brent compared the Grants to the Royales and assessed that "times weren't as fun in the Grant household." Natalie Corner from the Daily Mirror believed that Tomlinson's subsequent role as Jim had "outshined" the role of Bobby.

=== Analysis in books ===
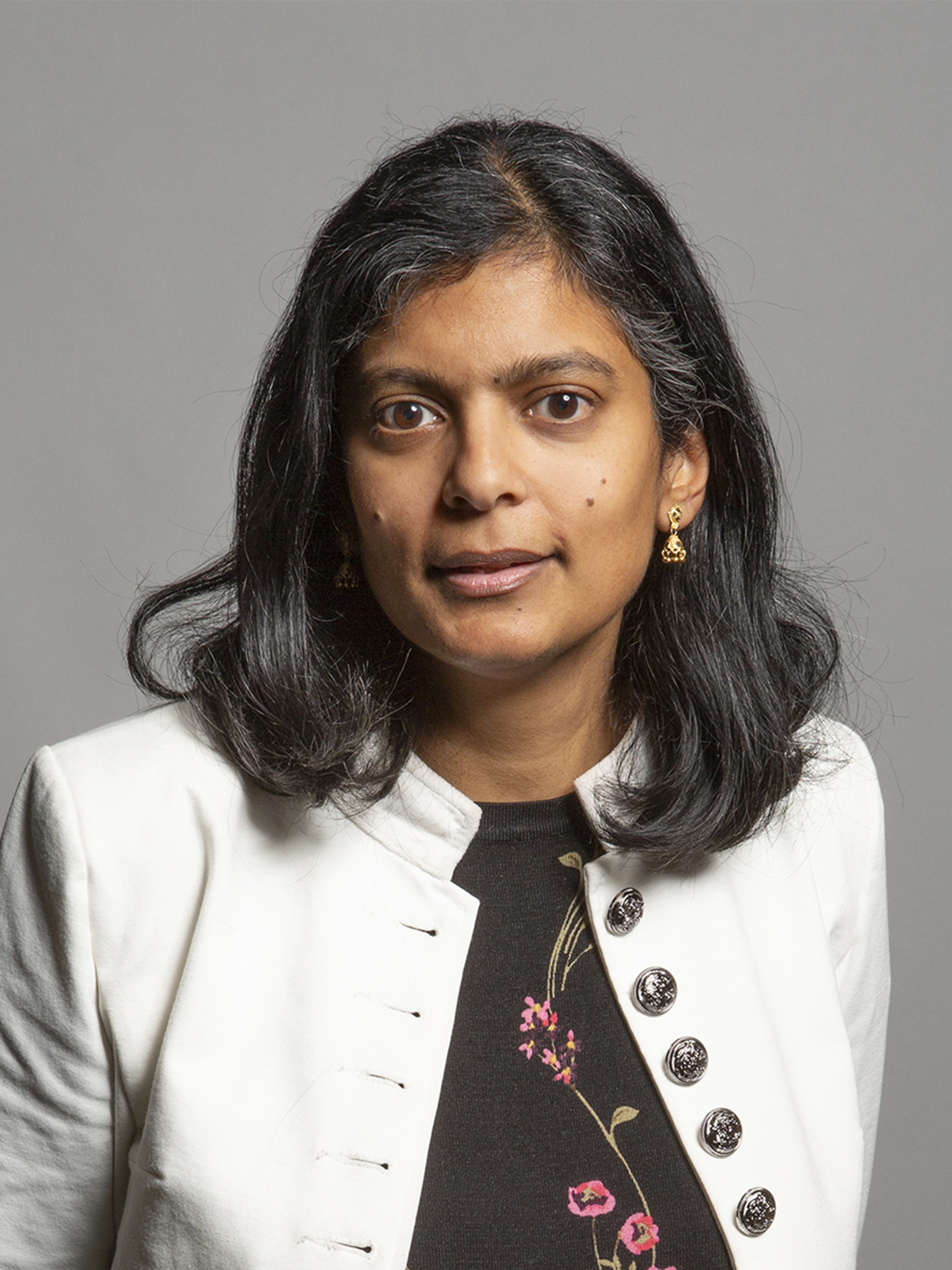
Labour MP Rupa Huq has analysed Bobby's role in Brookside.

Bobby's reach in popular culture has seen him mentioned in various print books. In The Who's Who of Soap Operas, author Anthony Hayward opined that Tomlinson "was perfect for the role of Bobby Grant" given his connections to construction site pickets. Kay Nicholls, author of the book Real Soap: Brookside likened Bobby to a "big bear father figure" and was "generally angry about something." Nicholls believed Bobby was originally "embarrassed" about living on Brookside Close and that he transformed into a "boorish trade unionist district secretary". They also branded Bobby and Sheila Brookside's "true grit originals". Kibble-White (Phil Redmond's 20 Years of Brookside) wrote that "Tomlinson provided not just Brookside, but British television, with one of its most overtly political characters." Eleanor Levy from the Record Mirror branded Bobby and Sheila "the most overtly political characters on the Close." Author of Making Sense of Suburbia through Popular Culture, Rupa Huq stated that via Bobby, Brookside writers explored the "1980s in spirit for dealing with the crises of deindustrialisation and emasculated trade union power."

In the book, British TV Comedies, Angela Krewani wrote that Tomlinson and Johnston "figure as the anchor couple" of Brookside. She compared Bobby to Ken Loach's film characters and delineated him as "outspoken about his left-wing positions. His extreme political positions conflate with the soap's focus on socially controversial topics." Dorothy Hobson (Soap Opera) believed that Brookside writers were sensitive about social subjects such as the recession. Using the Grants as her example, Hobson described Bobby as a working class shop steward which results in his family being directly affected by the recession. In a positive critique, Hilary Kingsley, author of Soapbox wrote that Bobby was the "first hero" of a soap opera to care about things other than his family. He cared about "the unglamorous-factory floor" type of politics. She believed that his "political integrity" during the early 1980s made him "the darling of the trendy left". Describing Bobby's appearance and style, Kingsley assessed that there is "nothing glamorous about Bobby Grant. He's bearded, burly, wears awful clothes and barks" at his family. She added he is "a beer-guzzler, a good mate, a man's man" who is "played with total conviction" by Tomlinson.

Cynthia Carter and Linda Steiner (Critical Readings: Media And Gender) wrote that both Tomlinson and Bobby appeared to be aligned with Militant, an extreme left-wing branch of the Labour party. They assessed that "every week, without fail, there used to be an opportunity for him to make some kind of political speech." They added that writers kept propelling Bobby on an upwards trajectory in his career but kept him tied to unionist stories. Bobby was described as selling out his friends which lead Tomlinson's departure. They also accused Tomlinson as using the role to broadcast his own political views. In his book, Into The Woods: How Stories Work and Why We Tell Them television producer John Yorke believed that Brookside was a "bastion of old Labour values, largely conveyed through" Bobby and Sheila. He branded it "strong, powerful and radical stuff" because it was "anomalous to most of television at the time". Yorke viewed Bobby stories as one-dimensional because "no-one disagreed with Bobby. It teetered on propaganda."

Who Dares Wins: Britain, 1979-1982 writer, Dominic Sandbrook alluded to the fact that Thatcherism had a profound effect on the British television industry during the 1980s. They added this was displayed perfectly with characters such as Bobby and Sheila's moving to Brookside close to buy a house of their own. Similarly in the Encyclopedia of Television book, Horace Newcomb wrote that the Grant family member departure symbolised a change within Brookside itself. He asserted that the Grants were the embodiment of the Conservative party's vision of working class aspiring to own their own homes. He viewed Bobby as a "a trade unionist with a fierce attachment to socialist rhetoric" who "suffered unemployment". He added that Bobby and Sheila's divorce "symbolised the breakdown of the traditional post-World War II family unit." Jonathan Bignell and Stephen Lacey, who wrote British Television Drama: Past, Present and Future assessed that Brookside chose characters to reflect the 1980s social tensions of the United Kingdom. They stated that Bobby and Sheila played the role of a "aspirational Catholic working-class couple wanting to lift their children out of the council estate background and own their own home."

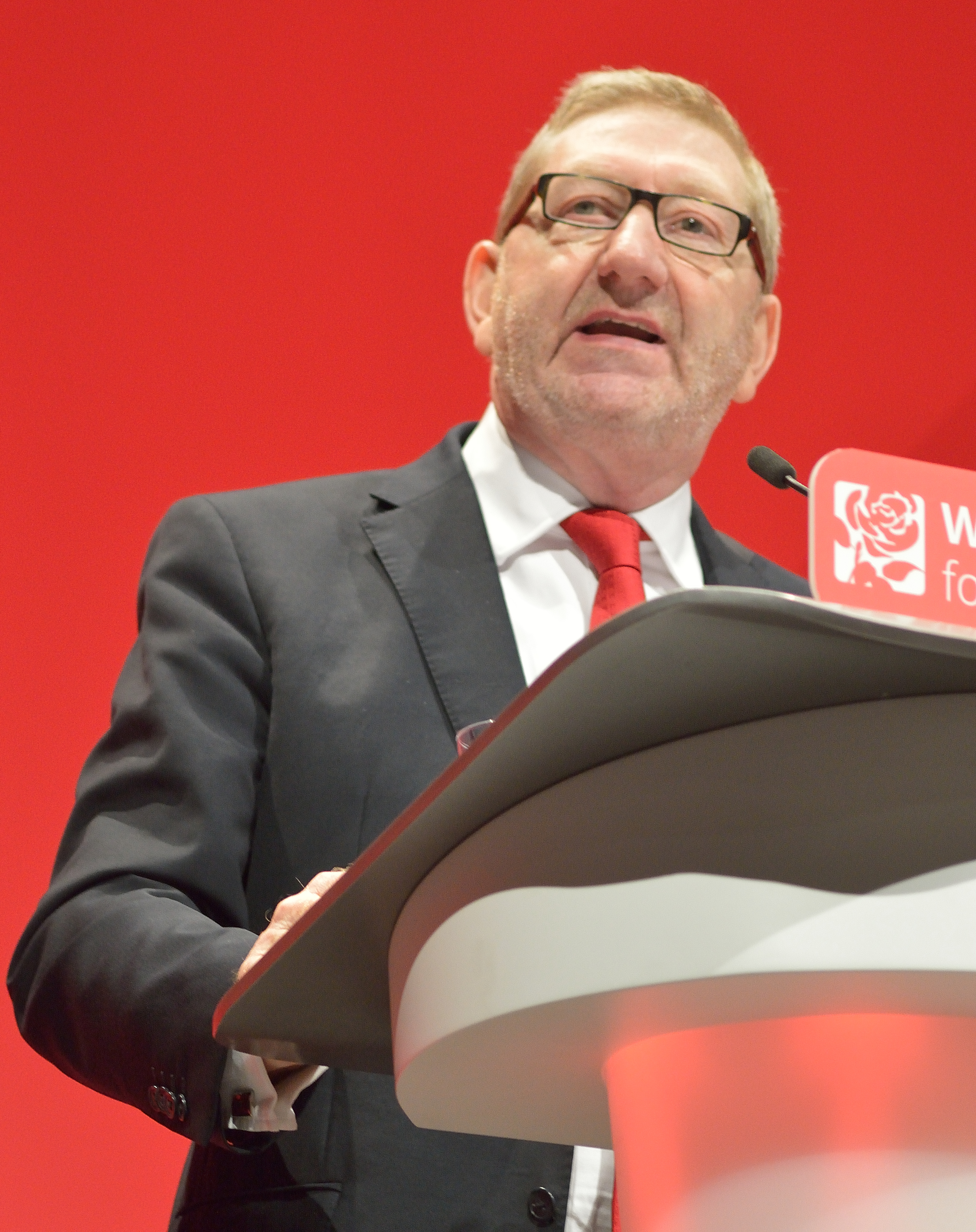
British trade unionist Len McCluskey has praised the character.

Len McCluskey, author of Why You Should Be a Trade Unionist wrote "Perhaps uniquely, Brookside, set in Liverpool in the 1980s, reflected the trade union principles of some of the inhabitants of the Close. The great and brave real life trade unionist Ricky Tomlinson, as Bobby Grant, fought hard for his members' rights in his workplace, and brought his trade unionism right back into his community, albeit a cul-de-sac of middle class semis, where people got buried under patios."

In his book, Jimmy McGovern, Steve Blandford credited McGovern as being responsible for much of the Grant's writing and Bobby's views. He noted that the family were "one of the bedrocks of Brookside in its earliest days." Blandford stated that "patriarch" Bobby's "unease" about moving to Brookside Close was brought out via his interactions with Paul Collins. In the book, To Be Continued... Soap Operas Around the World, Christine Geraghty wrote about the positive development of soap opera male roles during the 1980s. She praised Brookside's portrayal of Bobby, branding him a "complex male character" who challenged the then "secure gender positions" in soaps. Geraghty believed that during the 1990s, Brookside lacked strong father roles it once portrayed during 1980s. She concluded that "the debates about power in the family which so strongly marked the relationships between Bobby and Sheila" had disappeared. In her own book, Geraghty wrote that after watching Bobby's strike action, his values were "political ones of justice, class and solidarity."

=== Character criticism ===
Bobby's later behaviours caused the British media to call him "beer swigging", "beer-swilling Bobby Grant" and a "hard drinking union official". Geraghty believed that the writers treatment of Bobby's role as "head of the family" became more "critical and harsh" as writers developed him. A reporter from Sunday World assessed that Bobby "turned into a nasty bully with about as much sense of humour as Kurt Waldheim." They added that "more than a few Brookside fans, including myself have been puzzled at the way Sheila and Bobby Grant's marriage broke up not with the powerful bang but a whimper." Frank Jeffery and Graham Ball from The People branded Bobby and Sheila "dead end scousers" who needed more "reality and humour". West from Liverpool Echo stated that Bobby had a "grim dogma".

In 1996, Vicki Coppock from feminist magazine, Trouble & Strife criticised Brookside for not fully developing female characters. She believed that Sheila's role as Bobby's wife limited development during her during her university storyline. Coppock believed that subsequent characters similar to Bobby with trade unionist characteristics were, Frank Rogers (Peter Christian) and Eddie Banks (Paul Broughton). Day-Lewis, writer of Talk of Drama believed that Bobby was unrecognisable during some of Sheila's memorable stories. He judged that "his incipient male chauvinism surfaced in his inadequate response to Sheila's rape, his disapproval of her taking on an Open University degree course and his accusations over her supposed affair with a lecturer." The Daily Mirror's Irwin opined that the "militant shop steward" Bobby was a predictable role for Tomlinson to take on, given his past in political affairs.
