= Speke-Garston (ward) =

Coordinates: 53.348°N 2.878°W

Speke Garston is a Liverpool City Council Ward, within the Garston and Halewood Parliamentary constituency. It was formed for the 2004 Municipal elections from the former St Mary's ward and includes the Garston, Speke and Oglet areas. The population of this ward at the 2011 census was 20,300.

The resignation of Liberal Democrat Cllr Danny Hughes led to a by election taking place on 8 March 2007, which was subsequently won by the Labour candidate, Colin Strickland.

== Councillors ==
The ward has returned seven councillors

Election	Councillor	Councillor	Councillor
2004	Frank Roderick (LD)	Paula Keaveney (LD)	Danny Hughes (LD)
2006	Doreen Knight (Lab)	Paula Keaveney (LD)	Danny Hughes (LD)
2007	Doreen Knight (Lab)	Mary Rasmussen (Lab)	Colin Strickland (Lab)
2008	Doreen Knight (Lab)	Mary Rasmussen (Lab)	Colin Strickland (Lab)
2010	Doreen Knight (Lab)	Mary Rasmussen (Lab)	Colin Strickland (Lab)
2011	Doreen Knight (Lab)	Mary Rasmussen (Lab)	Colin Strickland (Lab)
2012	Doreen Knight (Lab)	Mary Rasmussen (Lab)	Colin Strickland (Lab)
2014	Doreen Knight (Lab)	Mary Rasmussen (Lab)	Colin Strickland (Lab)
2015	Doreen Knight (Lab)	Mary Rasmussen (Lab)	Colin Strickland (Lab)
2016	Doreen Knight (Lab)	Mary Rasmussen (Lab)	Leon Tootle (Lab)
2018	Doreen Knight (Lab)	Mary Rasmussen (Lab)	Leon Tootle (Lab)
2019	Doreen Knight (Lab)	Mary Rasmussen (Lab)	Leon Tootle (Lab)

indicates seat up for re-election after boundary changes.

indicates seat up for re-election.

indicates change in affiliation.

indicates seat up for re-election after casual vacancy.

== Election results ==
=== Elections of the 2010s ===
==== 2019 ====
Liverpool City Council Municipal Elections: 2nd May 2019
Party	Candidate	Votes	%	±%
Labour	Mary Rasmussen	2,365	79.84%	▼2.99
Green	Jonathan Key	299	10.09%	▲4.30
Liberal Democrats	Wiebke Ruterjans	178	6.01	▲0.22
Conservative	Michael Borman	120	4.05%	▼1.55
Majority		2,066	69.75%	▼7.29
Turnout		2,996	21.74%	▼1.38
Registered electors		13,781		
Rejected ballots		34	1.13%	▲0.85
Labour hold		Swing	▼3.64	

==== 2018 ====
Liverpool City Council Municipal Elections: 3rd May 2018
Party	Candidate	Votes	%	±%
Labour	Doreen Knight	2,634	82.83%	▲3.88
Green	Rachael Joanne Blackman Stretton	184	5.79%	▼2.67
Liberal Democrats	Alan Peter Tormey	184	5.79%	▼2.14
Conservative	James Kenton Craig	178	5.60%	▲0.94
Majority		2,450	77.04%	▲6.55
Turnout		3,189	23.12%	▼2.88
Registered electors		13,792		
Rejected ballots		9	0.28%	▼0.95
Labour hold		Swing	▲3.28	

==== 2016 ====
Liverpool City Council Municipal Elections: 5th May 2016
Party	Candidate	Votes	%	±%
Labour	Leon Paul Tootle	2,659	78.95	▼1.08
Green	James Joseph Myles	285	8.46%	▲3.46
Liberal Democrats	Michael Francis Dunne	267	7.93%	▲4.77
Conservative	Patricia Anita Waddington	157	4.66%	▲0.52
Majority		2,374	70.49%	▼1.88
Turnout		3,410	26.00%	▼35.70
Registered electors		13,116		
Rejected ballots		42	1.23%	▲0.86
Labour hold		Swing	▼2.27	

==== 2015 ====
Liverpool City Council Municipal Elections: 7th May 2015
Party	Candidate	Votes	%	±%
Labour	Mary Rasmussen	6,412	80.03%	▼0.09
UKIP	Carl Schears	614	7.66%	N/A
Green	Lee Michael Keegan	401	5.00%	▼3.61
Conservative	Derek Thomas Nuttall	332	4.14%	▼0.73
Liberal Democrats	Timothy David Paul Pollard	253	3.16%	▼3.16
Majority		5,798	72.37%	▲0.86
Turnout		8,042	61.70%	▲35.48
Registered electors		13,034		
Rejected ballots		30	0.37%	
Labour hold		Swing		

==== 2014 ====
Liverpool City Council Municipal Elections 2014: 22nd May 2014
Party	Candidate	Votes	%	±%
Labour	Doreen Knight	2717	80.12%	−4.70%
Green	Pam Robinson	292	8.61%	+1.89%
Conservative	Lewis Wooding-Smith	165	4.87%	+1.84%
Liberal Democrats	Kris Brown	161	4.75%	−0.67%
Liberal	Colin Edwards	56	1.65%	n/a
Majority		2,425	71.51%	−6.59%
Turnout		3391	26.22%	−1.30%
Labour hold		Swing	-3.30%	

==== 2012 ====
Liverpool City Council Municipal Elections 2012: 3rd May 2012
Party	Candidate	Votes	%	±%
Labour	Colin Strickland	2940	84.82%	+2.62%
Green	Helen Elizabeth Randall	233	6.72%	+2.36%
Liberal Democrats	Rachel Helen Oelbaum	188	5.42%	−0.91%
Conservative	Julian Mann	105	3.03%	−0.63%
Majority		2,707	78.10%	+2.23%
Turnout		3466	27.52%	−2.82%
Labour hold		Swing	+0.13%	

==== 2011 ====
Liverpool City Council Municipal Elections 2011: 5th May 2011
Party	Candidate	Votes	%	±%
Labour	Mary Rasmussen	3,167	82.20%	+1.62%
Liberal Democrats	Philip Wren	244	6.33%	−0.85%
Green	Helen Randall	168	4.36%	+0.89%
Conservative	Nigel Barber	141	3.66%	−2.76%
Liberal	John Harold Pagan	133	3.45	+1.11%
Majority		2923	75.87	+2.47%
Turnout		3853	30.34%	−17.09%
Labour hold		Swing	+0.39%	

==== 2010 ====
Liverpool City Council Municipal Elections 2010: Speke-Garston
Party	Candidate	Votes	%	±%
Labour	Doreen Knight	4847	80.58%	+17.22%
Liberal Democrats	Rachel Helen Oelbaum	432	7.18%	−9.08%
Conservative	Norman Coppell	386	6.42%	+0.61%
Green	Helen Anne McAlister	209	3.47%	+0.31%
Liberal	John Harold Pagan	141	2.34%	−2.01%
Majority		4415	73.40%	
Turnout		6015	47.43%	
Labour hold		Swing	+13.15%	

=== Elections of the 2000s ===
==== 2008 ====
Liverpool City Council Municipal Elections 2008: Speke-Garston
Party	Candidate	Votes	%	±%
Labour	Colin Strickland	1866	63.36%	
Liberal Democrats	Jackie Elaine Wilson	479	16.26%	
BNP	Jane Greenhalgh	208	7.06%	
Conservative	Brenda Coppell	171	5.81%	
Liberal	Irene Norah Mayes	128	4.35%	
Green	Fiona Coyne	93	3.16%	
Majority				
Turnout		2945	23.19%	
Labour hold		Swing		

==== 2007 ====
Liverpool City Council Municipal Elections 2007: Speke-Garston
Party	Candidate	Votes	%	±%
Labour	Mary Rasmussen	1859	57.13%	
Liberal Democrats	Paula Keaveney	990	30.42%	
BNP	Steven McEllenborough	190	5.84%	
Conservative	Brenda Coppell	81	2.49%	
Green	Cherry Fitzsimmons	75	2.30%	
Liberal	John Harold Pagan	59	1.81%	
Majority				
Turnout		3254	25.58%	
Labour gain from Liberal Democrats		Swing		

==== 2007 by-election ====
Speke-Garston by-election, 8th March 2007
Party	Candidate	Votes	%	±%
Labour	Colin Strickland	1984	54.30%	
Liberal Democrats	Lynnie Marie Williams	1218	33.33%	
BNP	Steven Greenhalgh	281	7.69%	
Green	Cherry Fitzsimmons	68	1.86%	
Conservative	Brenda Coppell	54	1.48%	
UKIP	Mark Eric Bill	49	1.34%	
Majority				
Turnout		3654	28.71%	
Labour gain from Liberal Democrats		Swing		

==== 2006 ====
Liverpool City Council Municipal Elections 2006: Speke-Garston
Party	Candidate	Votes	%	±%
Labour	Doreen Knight	2141	59.29%	
Liberal Democrats	Francis Stanley Roderick	1138	31.51%	
Green	Cherry Fitzsimmons	141	3.90%	
Conservative	Denise Mary Nuttall	107	2.96%	
Liberal	Michael Alan Williams	84	2.33%	
Majority				
Turnout		3611	27.31%	
Labour gain from Liberal Democrats		Swing		

==== 2004 ====
After the boundary change of 2004 the whole of Liverpool City Council faced election. Three Councillors were returned at this election.

Liverpool City Council Municipal Elections 2004: Speke-Garston
Party	Candidate	Votes	%	±%
Liberal Democrats	Danny Hughes	2368		
Liberal Democrats	Paula Keaveney	2313		
Liberal Democrats	Frank Roderick	2211		
Labour	Doreen Knight	1608		
Labour	Colin Strickland	1506		
Labour	Raymond Carrick	1417		
Conservative	Denise Nuttall	169		
Majority				
Turnout		4433	33.89%	
Liberal Democrats hold		Swing	n/a	
