= Gillian Kearney =

British actress (born 1972)

- Born: Gillian Louise Kearney; 9 May 1972 (age 54); Aigburth, Liverpool, England
- Education: Rose Bruford College
- Occupation: Actress
- Years active: 1986–present
- Television: Brookside (1986–1989); Damon and Debbie (1987); Shameless (2005–2007); Casualty (2008–2010); Emmerdale (2015–2017, 2024)
- Partner: Eddie Foo
- Children: 1

Gillian Louise Kearney (born 9 May 1972) is an English actress. She is best known for her roles in television as Debbie McGrath in Brookside and spin-off Damon and Debbie, Jessica Harrison in Casualty and Emma Barton in Emmerdale.

== Early life ==
One of four children born to Gerard and Barbara (née Allerston) Kearney, Kearney has three brothers, including Tom, a professional footballer. Her father is a retired civil engineer, and her mother a school care worker. Growing up in Aigburth, she attended St. John Almond RC High School, Garston, where she gained nine GCSEs and four A-levels. She later trained at the Rose Bruford College.

== Career ==
Her interest in acting began at secondary school. After repeatedly being overlooked for the lead roles in school productions, she decided to join the Liverpool Playhouse Youth Theatre, where she featured in plays including All Flesh is Grass (as Ema), Katie Crackernuts and Yer Dancin'? It was there, in 1986, that she was spotted by members of the Mersey Television production team; this resulted in her being asked to audition for a role in Channel 4's soap opera Brookside. Kearney landed the role of Debbie McGrath, the girlfriend of Damon Grant, played by Simon O'Brien. When O'Brien decided to leave Brookside, he requested that his character be killed off so he wouldn't be tempted to return to the show. Because Damon was so popular, particularly with younger viewers, it was decided to create a "soap bubble" in which the character would meet his demise: the result, Damon and Debbie, became Britain's first mini-series spin-off from a soap opera. A year after filming her final scenes, Kearney was asked to return for a few episodes. Christmas 1988 saw Debbie McGrath make an unexpected return to visit Sheila Grant, Damon's mother; she arrived with her baby, Simon – Damon's son.

Kearney played the young Shirley in the award-winning 1989 film Shirley Valentine.

She also had the lead female part as Ellie Brookes in Sex, Chips & Rock n' Roll, a six-part television mini-series written and created by Debbie Horsfield and directed by John Woods. It was produced by Wall to Wall for BBC One originally airing in 1999 before being adapted into a successful stage musical.

In 2002, Kearney landed the role of June Forsyte in the ITV1 adaptation of John Galsworthy's classic novel The Forsyte Saga. She later reprised the role for the second series. Following the success of The Forsyte Saga, Kearney's next role brought her back onto the ITV screen in its newest medical drama, Sweet Medicine. Kearney was cast as Dr Deborah "Deb" Sweet, and starred alongside Jason Merrells, who played her husband, and Patricia Hodge as her formidable mother-in-law. The show was intended to take up the mantle of the popular rural drama Peak Practice, which had recently ended, but low viewing figures saw Sweet Medicine axed after just one series.

In 2005, Kearney landed a role in Channel 4's hit series Shameless, playing the role of Marty Fisher's (Jack Deam) girlfriend, Sue Garland. She left the show along with her on-screen partner in 2007. She had a number of television roles following her departure before landing the role of Jessica Harrison in Casualty, in January 2008. Kearney left Casualty in February 2010, but returned briefly to tie up the loose ends of her character's storyline in May 2010.

As of 2 January 2015, Kearney began appearing in the ITV soap opera Emmerdale, in the role of Emma Barton, the estranged wife of James Barton (Bill Ward) and mother of their three sons Pete (Anthony Quinlan), Ross (Michael Parr) and Finn (Joe Gill). Kearney has received critical acclaim for her performance, particularly when it came to the "No Return" week which saw the character hold James hostage and cause a huge crash that endangered the lives of seven Emmerdale residents; after Emma accidentally pushed James off the bridge, he later died. Kearney was nominated for Best Serial Drama Performance at the 2016 National Television Awards. In 2019, Kearney directed the 5Star woman's prison drama Clink.

== Personal life ==
Kearney lived in Crouch End, North London, from July 2000, and then rented a property in Clifton, Bristol, during her time appearing in Casualty. She returned to live in Liverpool after the birth of her son; she also rented a home in Yorkshire where she filmed Emmerdale, and a holiday home on the Atlantic coast of County Clare, Ireland.

In April 2009 Kearney mentioned, during a This Morning television interview, that she was seeing a final-year medical student called Eddie, whom she had met whilst in Bristol. Early in 2010, Kearney announced her engagement to Eddie Foo and their intention to marry later that year in Ireland, but the plans were soon put on hold when she discovered that she was expecting their first child. Kearney gave birth to a baby boy.

== Credits ==
=== Film ===
Year	Title	Role	Notes
1989	Shirley Valentine	Young Shirley	
2003	Homecoming	Dushuri	Short
2006	The Other Half	Holly Lamanuzzi	
2006	The Lives of Saints	Christella	
2006	London to Brighton	Kelly's next door neighbour	uncredited
2013	Harrigan	Bridie Wheland	
2013	Breakthrough	Judith	Short
2014	Sealed with a Kiss	Ginny	Short

=== Television ===
Year	Title	Role	Network	Notes
1986–1989	Brookside	Debbie McGrath	Channel 4	Regular role
1987	Damon and Debbie	Debbie McGrath	Channel 4	3 episodes, Mini Series
1990	The Final Frame	Cassy	Kinesis Films for Channel 4	TV movie
1991	Waterfront Beat	Helen	BBC One	6 episodes
1991	Casualty	Mandy	BBC1	1 episode
1995	Men of the World	Jenny	BBC One	1 episode
1996	The Tide of Life	Emily Kennedy	ITV	Mini Series
1996	Heartbeat	Susan Watkins	ITV	1 episode
1997	The Ruby Ring	Elizabeth Langley	Showtime	TV movie
1998	Hetty Wainthropp Investigates	Debra Woolmer	BBC One	1 episode
1998	Liverpool 1	Julie Callaghan	ITV	5 episodes
1998	The Things You Do for Love	Young Joan		TV movie
1999	Sex, Chips & Rock n' Roll	Ellie Brookes	BBC One	Mini Series
2000	Black Cab	Phil	BBC Two	1 episode
2000	Hope and Glory	Kitty Burton	BBC One	10 episodes
2000	In His Life: The John Lennon Story	Cynthia Lennon	NBC	TV movie
2001	Murder in Mind	Catrin Palmer	BBC One	1 episode
2001	Midsomer Murders	WPC Jay Nash	ITV	1 episode
2001–2002	Clocking Off	Lynne Watson	BBC One	2 episodes
2002	The Real Jane Austen	Jane Austen	BBC Two	TV documentary
2002–2003	The Forsyte Saga	June Forsyte	ITV	Mini Series
2003	Blue Murder	Lesley Tulley	ITV	2 episodes
2003	Sweet Medicine	Dr. Deborah Sweet	ITV	
2005	Where the Heart Is	Maria	ITV	1 episode
2005–2007	Shameless	Sue Garland	Channel 4	12 episodes
2007	Trial & Retribution	Gina Casper	ITV	1 episode
2007	Lilies	Miss Bird	BBC One	1 episode
2008	Primeval	Valerie Irwin	ITV	1 episode
2008–2010	Casualty	Jessica Harrison	BBC One	93 episodes
2011	Justice	Louise Scanlon	BBC One	
2012	Silent Witness	DI Bridges	BBC One	2 episodes
2013	Moving On	Danielle	BBC One	1 episode
2014	Suspects	Tamsin Shaffer	Channel 5	4 episodes
2015–2017, 2024	Emmerdale	Emma Barton	ITV	Regular role; 355 episodes
2024	Vera	Deborah McSwain	ITV	1 episode

=== Theatre ===
- Macbeth ... Lady Macduff, Witch; Everyman Theatre, Liverpool; 6 May – 11 June 2011
- Strangers, Babies ... May; Traverse Theatre, Edinburgh; 23 February – 17 March 2007
- The Flint Street Nativity ... Mary; Playhouse Theatre, Liverpool; 7 December 2006 – 20 January 2007
- Hedda Gabler ... Hedda Gabler
  - Playhouse Theatre, Liverpool; 23 March – 15 April 2006
  - West Yorkshire Playhouse (Quarry Theatre), Leeds; 17 February – 11 March 2006
- A Man of Principle ... Ruth; Colin's Bridewell, Liverpool; 26 October 2004
- A Midsummer Night's Dream ... Hermia; Albery Theatre, London; 16 March – 12 May 2001
- King Lear ... Cordelia; Royal Exchange Theatre, Manchester; 9 September – 23 October 1999
- The School for Wives ... Agnès
  - Comedy Theatre, London; 6 May – 2 August 1997
  - Piccadilly Theatre, London; 11 February – 26 April 1997
  - Theatre Royal, Bath; 9–14 December 1996
  - Festival Theatre, Chichester; 26–30 November 1996
  - Tyne Theatre and Opera House, Newcastle upon Tyne; 18–23 November 1996
  - Richmond Theatre, Richmond; 11–16 November 1996
  - King's Theatre, Edinburgh; 5–9 November 1996
  - Thorndike Theatre, Leatherhead; 8–26 October 1996
- The Rivals ... Lucy; Royal Exchange Theatre, Manchester; 8 February – 23 March 1996
- When We Are Married ... Nancy Holmes; Festival Theatre, Chichester; 24 July – 17 August 1996
- The School for Scandal ... Maria; Everyman Theatre, Liverpool; 1992
- Othello ... Desdemona; Everyman Theatre, Liverpool; 1992
- Alice in Wonderland ... Alice; Everyman Theatre, Liverpool; 1991
- The White Devil ... Giovanni; Everyman Theatre, Liverpool; 1991
- Your Home in the West ... Sharon; Royal Exchange Theatre, Manchester; 28 March – 13 April 1991

=== Radio ===
Year	Title	Role	Station
	Sex, Latte, Paperclips	Michelle	BBC
2013	Boots on the Ground	Dr Callard	BBC Radio 4
2014	Brief Lives	DC Archer	BBC Radio 4
2014	Bring Her Back	Dr. Moira Leigh	BBC Northern Ireland

== Awards and nominations ==
Year	Award	Category	Result	Ref.
2015	Inside Soap Awards	Best Bad Girl	Nominated	
2016	Inside Soap Awards	Best Bad Girl	Nominated	
2017	22nd National Television Awards	Serial Drama Performance	Nominated	
2017	The British Soap Awards	Villain of the Year	Nominated	
2017	Inside Soap Awards	Best Actress	Nominated	
2017	Inside Soap Awards	Best Bad Girl	Won	
2018	23rd National Television Awards	Serial Drama Performance	Nominated	
2018	The British Soap Awards	Villain of the Year	Nominated	
