= Karen Grant =

Fictional character from Brookside

- Brookside character
- Portrayed by: Shelagh O'Hara
- Duration: 1982–1986, 1988, 1990
- First appearance: 3 November 1982
- Last appearance: 10 August 1990
- Created by: Phil Redmond
In-universe information
- Father: Bobby Grant
- Mother: Sheila Corkhill
- Stepfather: Billy Corkhill
- Brothers: Damon Grant
- Sisters: Claire Grant
- Half-brothers: Barry Grant
- Uncles: Richard
- Aunts: Margaret Jefferson; Claire; Brenda
- Nephews: Simon McGrath; Stephen Pearson
- First cousins: Matthew Jefferson; Helen Jefferson

Karen Grant is a character in Brookside portrayed by Shelagh O'Hara from 1982 until 1986 with returns in 1988 and 1990.

== Grant Family ==
The Grant family consisted of Bobby Grant, Sheila Grant, Barry Grant, Karen Grant and Damon Grant. The family moved onto the Middle Class Brookside Close from a rundown council estate.

== Character in early episodes ==
Karen Grant debuts in the series' second episode. 16-year-old Karen represented youth subculture and was moody, keeping herself apart from her parents. Karen had a boyfriend, Duanne, in the early episodes, whom Bobby and Sheila thoroughly disapproved of.

Karen is close in age to younger brother Damon. The two have a love-hate relationship, often engaging in arguments. At the same time, however, they are often allies in rebelling against Sheila's staunch Catholic upbringing (refusing to go to church with her, for example). As Karen became a more settled character, she often tried to calm hot-headed Damon.

Karen's elder brother Barry was fairly protective of her, even beating up Duanne after he tried to force Karen to have sex with him (something Barry was later stabbed for). Barry also obtained contraception for Karen behind her mother's back.

In early episodes Karen had a typical adolescent awkward relationship with both her parents. After Sheila's rape, when their marriage became strained, she mediated between them.

== Character in later episodes ==
In 1985 Karen enrolled at the University of Liverpool, studying Communications and writing for the University newsletter, notably interviewing TV presenter Paula Yates during her visit to the city. She also dated a fellow student named Guy during her first year. In later episodes Karen no longer was portrayed as an awkward adolescent, instead becoming the most eloquent member of the Grant family and moving to London at the end of 1986, though she returned briefly in 1988 when she was seen by her mother at Damon's grave, and again in 1990 for her mother's wedding to Billy Corkhill.
