= Sweet Medicine =

- Starring: Patricia Hodge; Jason Merrells; Gillian Kearney
- No. of series: 1
- No. of episodes: 10

Original release
- Network: ITV
- Release: 4 September – 2 November 2003

Sweet Medicine is an ITV drama series from 2003 about a family doctor's surgery in the Peak District of central England. Intended as a replacement for the hit medical drama Peak Practice, it was not a success. Only one ten-episode series was made, despite moderate audience figures. Some viewers considered it too raunchy, especially for a 9:00pm broadcast.

The majority of filming took place in the historic market town of Wirksworth, which made the set for the fictional Derbyshire town of Stoneford.

Sweet Medicine starred Patricia Hodge as Georgina Sweet, Jason Merrells as Dr. Nicholas Sweet and Gillian Kearney as Dr. Deb Sweet.
