= Shelley Webb =

British writer and television presenter

Shelley Webb is a British TV presenter, writer, and sports journalist and author of the book Footballers' Wives Tell Their Tales. The book was the basis of the ITV series Footballers' Wives, which was an "enormous hit."

== Personal life ==
Webb married former England footballer Neil Webb, and the couple had two children Luke and Josh, who both became professional footballers. Webb's father was a professional footballer, and she has been a fan since childhood. She was a university student when she and Neil met. They married when she was 21.

== Career ==
Webb, who holds a first-class honours degree in English and History, trained as a journalist before her marriage and resumed that career with the local Nottingham Evening Post, working as an occasional sports writer. She was forced to turn down a job as a radio broadcaster in Nottingham when Neil Webb moved from Nottingham Forest to Manchester United. She later moved to TV presenting. She worked as an on-air journalist for Standing Room Only (UK TV Programme), then for BBC World Service Television.

This professional visibility led to interviews about her life as a footballer's wife, and, eventually, led her to write the book Footballers' Wives Tell Their Tales in 1998, the year she and Neil split up.

Her Footballers' Wives looked at the reality of being a modern footballer's wife. Webb interviewed 14 of her fellow footballer's wives for her 1998 book, painting what The Daily Telegraph called "a dismal picture of chronic insecurity, upheaval, boredom and loneliness."

The book was the basis for the TV series Footballers' Wives, a series that portrayed the lives of footballers and their families in the years when they became "like pop stars", receiving a level of coverage that the Scotsman described as "even sillier" than fan enthusiasm, as well as offers of sex and a lack of privacy.
