= Standing Room Only (1991 TV programme) =

British football TV programme (1991-1994)

- Presented by: Simon O'Brien
- Country of origin: United Kingdom
- Original language: English
- No. of series: 4
- No. of episodes: 32

Production
- Running time: 30 minutes

Original release
- Network: BBC2
- Release: 16 September 1991 – 4 May 1994

Standing Room Only is a British association football television programme that was broadcast on BBC2 between 16 September 1991 and 4 May 1994.

Standing Room Only was produced by the BBC's Youth and Entertainment Features department, at the time headed up by Janet Street-Porter, who was also executive producer. The first series consisted of six episodes broadcast in BBC2's "Def II" slot. The host was Simon O'Brien (who would later also co-present a series of Def II's Rough Guide to the World with Magenta Devine) but other people, including Shelley Webb, presented small sections of the programme. The format was magazine style mixing current news stories with star interviews and comedy. Notably involved were comedians David Baddiel and Rob Newman who delivered weekly sketches under the banner of "Sepp Maier's Comedy Shorts", Rory Bremner who recorded comedy voices, and Guardian cartoonist Steve Bell who drew a weekly graphic comic strip. The series was inspired by the growing mainstream interest in football and the popularity of football fanzines magazines, notably When Saturday Comes which offered the opinions of football fans themselves rather than professionals. It had an informal style, with presenters usually standing near football grounds rather than sitting in a studio. In 1994, Baddiel would go on to co-host the hugely successful football series Fantasy Football League with fellow comedian Frank Skinner.

One feature was the Supporterloo (a pun on portaloo), a small trailer with little more than a camera and a seat shaped like a toilet, which was taken to different grounds around the UK. Members of the public were invited to sit inside and give their views on their favourite team. On one occasion the Blackburn Rovers reserve goalkeeper Bobby Mimms sat inside and expressed his frustration at not playing regularly for Rovers' first team.

== Episodes ==
This list is ordered by the original air dates on BBC2 in the United Kingdom.

=== Series 1 ===
No. in series	Original release date
1.1	16 September 1991
Simon O'Brien drops in at Glenn Hoddle's house to watch the England v Germany game on television. And there's a report from Dresden on the neo-Nazi threat among the crowds of the German first division, the Bundesliga. Comedians David Baddiel and Rob Newman team up to sketch some sharp comedy from the terraces.
1.2	23 September 1991
Why do big clubs with multi-million pound players not have qualified physiotherapists on their staff? Standing Room Only joins former England star Danny Thomas on his first week as a qualified NHS physiotherapist. And ex-PFA Chairman Garth Crooks has the chance to put last year's FA Cup Final referee Roger Milford on the spot.
1.3	30 September 1991
1.4	7 October 1991
1.5	14 October 1991
Wendy Toms is accompanied by the Standing Room Only team for a day in the life of English football's first female referee.
1.6	21 October 1991
Simon O'Brien follows a day in the life of commentator John Motson as he covers an England game, and Dutch master Johann Cruyff talks exclusively from Barcelona about the pressure that nearly killed him.

=== Series 2 ===
No. in series	Original release date
1.1	30 March 1992
George Best relives famous moments and criticises the behaviour of some modern-day fans, and there's a look at claims that Merseyside giants Liverpool and Everton are turning their backs on a wealth of local black talent.
1.2	6 April 1992
Liam Brady speaks his mind about the modern game and looks back on an extraordinary career which saw him become one of the world's greatest players and now manager of Celtic. Also a report on press photographers, spending a match day with sports cameraman Michael Steele.
1.3	13 April 1992
Former Spurs player and ex-Newcastle manager Ossie Ardiles reflects on his career. And, in the week that Dutch club Ajax play Genoa in the Uefa Cup semi-finals, Bobby Robson discusses Ajax's innovative youth policy.
1.4	27 April 1992
The big money behind video soccer and West Germany's World Cup star Jurgen Klinsmann on paparazzi pressures at Inter Milan. With Simon O'Brien.
1.5	4 May 1992
This week: the results of a nationwide survey into the FA's laws of disrepute. Every League manager in England and Scotland has been questioned on their understanding of the current regulations and asked whether they think they are too severe and need changing. Their answers will be presented to the FA. And, with just two years to go before the next World Cup, a report on how football is growing in popularity in the USA – among women.

=== Series 3 ===
No. in series	Original release date
1.1	7 September 1992
Kevin Allen leads the team out to tackle the issues, meet the personalities and net the stories that make our national game. Plus an exclusive interview with Pele.
1.2	14 September 1992
Includes a profile of Bobby Charlton, and the first fan elected to the boardroom by his fellow supporters. Presented by Kevin Allen.
1.3	21 September 1992
French tennis star Yannick Noah talks about his team Paris St-Germain and there's an interview with Italian goalkeeper Dino Zoff.
1.4	28 September 1992
A Euro fanzine, and an interview with legendary Denis Law.
1.5	5 October 1992
Life at the bottom for Middlesbrough YTS trainees.
1.6	12 October 1992
Eusebio reflects on his spectacular career.

=== Series 4 ===
No. in series	Original release date
1.1	19 April 1993
1.2	26 April 1993
1.3	3 May 1993
1.4	10 May 1993
1.5	17 May 1993

=== Series 5 ===
No. in series	Original release date
1.1	6 September 1993
With vital World Cup matches this week, the football fans' show returns with an interview with England manager Graham Taylor and a report from Switzerland on the Englishman who has become an unlikely national hero. Presented by Simon O'Brien and Shelley Webb.
1.2	13 September 1993
1.3	20 September 1993
1.4	27 September 1993
1.5	4 October 1993

=== Series 6 ===
No. in series	Original release date
1.1	6 April 1994
1.2	13 April 1994
1.3	20 April 1994
1.4	27 April 1994
1.5	4 May 1994
