= Damon and Debbie =

- Damon presents Debbie with some roses
- Created by: Phil Redmond
- Written by: Frank Cottrell-Boyce
- Directed by: Bob Carlton
- Starring: Simon O'Brien; Gillian Kearney
- Country of origin: United Kingdom
- Original language: English
- No. of episodes: 3

Production
- Producer: Colin McKeown
- Running time: 50 mins

Original release
- Network: Channel 4
- Release: 4 November – 18 November 1987

Related
- Brookside

Damon and Debbie is a three-part spin-off from the Channel 4 soap opera Brookside first broadcast in November 1987. A Mersey Television production, it was written by Frank Cottrell-Boyce, directed by Bob Carlton, and produced by Colin McKeown. The series is credited as the first 'soap bubble'.

The series followed teen sweethearts Damon Grant (Simon O'Brien) and Debbie McGrath (Gillian Kearney) as they absconded to York to escape their disapproving parents in Liverpool who objected to the relationship because of the class divide. It ended with the death of Damon, who had been a regular character in Brookside since its launch in 1982.

== Production ==
=== Development ===
Damon and Debbie was developed in response to several factors, according to Brookside creator Phil Redmond. Firstly, the producers were keen to develop further "high-octane storylines" having seen the audience and media response to 1985's siege storyline, in which nurses Pat, Sandra and Kate were held hostage in their home, concluding in the latter's murder. Actor Simon O'Brien, who had played Damon Grant since the show's first episode in 1982, said he not only wished to leave the show, but requested that his character be killed off. Additionally the intention was to celebrate Brookside's fifth anniversary in November 1987, and the production team and executives were keen to mark the occasion.

The Grant family had recently featured in major storylines, particularly the rape of Sheila Grant (played by Sue Johnston), and Damon was used to illustrate the problems of the Thatcher ministry's Youth Training Scheme (YTS), which saw Damon, who expected to be employed by a firm for whom he had worked for low wages, but being told that the company were simply going to replace him with further cheap labour at the end of his service in the scheme. Following both of these storylines, executive producer Phil Redmond suggests, Damon's departure would have to be "something a bit special".

The producers developed the idea of a 'soap bubble', a term which Redmond credits to Channel 4 executive David Rose, so that the multi-stranded narrative of Brookside would continue during the standard episodes, with two characters co-existing in a separate production. Damon and Debbie is generally recognised as the first instance of a UK soap opera expanding its narrative world in such a way. According to Annie Leask of The Sunday Mirror, the spin-off was a result of the characters' popularity with the viewing public.

The character of Debbie McGrath (Gillian Kearney) was introduced into Brookside as Damon Grant's girlfriend. Her being younger than Damon caused friction between the parents of both characters, alongside a class-divide, a plot-line which saw one critic refer to it as like "Romeo and Juliet in trackies". When their parents objected to them dating, the couple decided to elope from Liverpool to York, an adventure which was depicted in Damon and Debbie.

=== Filming ===
Filming took place over six weeks. The scenes in which Debbie attends an open day were filmed on 19 September 1987 at the University of York. The same corridor was used several times for the scenes in which Damon tries to find her, with the furniture rearranged to make it appear different each time, and a stunt double called Jason Housecroft was used for scenes of Damon running away from the camera down the corridor. The computer graphic ("Damon loves Debbie") that Debbie programs within a few minutes was programmed by Charles Forsyth.

== Episodes ==
The three-part series was broadcast late on Wednesday evenings on Channel 4 in November 1987, with an omnibus edition screened over the Christmas period of that year.

No.	Directed by	Written by	Original release date
1	Bob Carlton	Frank Cottrell Boyce	4 November 1987
Having run away from their parents in Liverpool, Damon and Debbie squat on a boat moored on the River Ouse in York. They have chosen York because it is the home of one of the universities Debbie wishes to attend. Their aims are for Debbie to go to university whilst Damon begins a painter/decorator business. In the meantime, Damon works in the Dick Turpin-themed Burger Bar in Coney Street, managed by Lettuce (Siobhan Maher). One day, while Debbie attends an open day at the University of York, the boat's owner returns and sails away with all of their belongings, including her medication. Meanwhile, in Liverpool, Debbie's family, who are hostile towards Damon, begin the hunt for them after discovering a University of York prospectus in her bedroom.
2	Bob Carlton	Frank Cottrell Boyce	11 November 1987
The couple visit Morecambe with Goth papadum-packer Jenny (Michelle Holmes), whom Debbie had met at the open day, and her husband, computer programmer Kirk (Ian Ormsby-Knox). They then move to Bradford, where Damon works as a groundsman at the Valley Parade football ground (reflecting, in an interior monologue, upon the fire there a year earlier). In Bradford, they stay with friends Patrick (Lyndam Gregory) and Apala (Seeta Indrani). In a montage they are seen visiting what was then the National Museum of Photography, Film and Television. Throughout the episode, Debbie, who has kept her diabetes secret from Damon, tries to locate a pharmacy to obtain insulin, having left her own supply on the boat in York.
3	Bob Carlton	Frank Cottrell Boyce	18 November 1987
When Damon sees Debbie injecting herself with insulin, he wrongly concludes that she is a drug addict, as does Patrick. Debbie's uncles continue their search for the couple, finally tracking them down after they return to York. The series concludes when, after a mock marriage in a hotel room, Damon is stabbed by an unknown assailant on a dark riverbank and dies in Debbie's arms.

Following the broadcast of Damon and Debbie, the storyline returned to Brookside. Police are seen arriving to break the news to Sheila Grant (Sue Johnston) in episode 529, broadcast on 23 November 1987. Debbie returned to Brookside, and Damon's funeral was featured in the episode of Brookside broadcast on 1 December. Crosby actor Jonathan Comer, the extra who played the part of Damon's killer, began to receive threatening phone calls and hate mail shortly after the episode was broadcast.

== Music ==
The music played over the opening and closing credits was written by Steve Wright, who had also written the Brookside theme. Dani Ali performed "Talk to Me", a song written for the show's closing credits, on episodes one and three, with a recording by English singer-songwriter Annabel Lamb accompanying the credits of episode two. Both versions of the song were releases on the Ariola label through BMG; Ali's version as the A-side, with Lamb's version on side B (titled "Her Song"). The single peaked at no. 110 on the UK Singles Chart. The title was also the closing spoken line of dialogue in all three episodes.

== Main cast ==
- Simon O'Brien as Damon Grant
- Gillian Kearney as Debbie McGrath
- Siobhan Maher as Lettuce Fitzgerald
- Michelle Holmes as Jenny
- Iain Ormsby-Knox as Kirk
- Nick Maloney as Tom McGrath
- Annie Tyson as Bridget McGrath
- John Basham as Nick
- Neil Caple as Lonnie
- Geoff Atwell as Tone
- Lyndam Gregory as Patrick Chaudhury
- Seeta Indrani as Apala Chaudhury
- Jaye Griffiths as Zoe
- James Neale-Kennerlry as Sadhir

== Bibliography ==
- Redmond, Phil (2012). Mid-Term Report. London: Random House. ISBN 978-1-8460-5984-1.
