= Mary Rasmussen (politician) =

English politician

Councillor Mary Rasmussen

Lord Mayor of Liverpool
- In office 17 May 2023 – 15 May 2024
- Preceded by: Roy Gladden
- Succeeded by: Richard Kemp
- In office 28 May 2021 – 25 May 2022
- Preceded by: Anna Rothery
- Succeeded by: Roy Gladden

Liverpool City Councillor for Speke-Garston
- Incumbent
- Assumed office 4 May 2007
- Preceded by: Doreen Knight
- Majority: 1,768 (79.8%)

Personal details
- Born: Garston, Liverpool
- Party: Labour
- Children: Michael; Janine; Lian
- Education: Blessed John Almond School

Mary Rasmussen (née Gibbons) is a British Labour Party politician and former Lord Mayor of Liverpool. She has represented the Speke-Garston ward in Liverpool City Council since May 2007.

== Early life and education ==
Rasmussen was born in Garston, Liverpool to Irish parents - Thomas and Theresa Gibbons - as the third of ten children. She attended St. Francis of Assisi Primary School and later Blessed John Almond School. She completed an access to university course before opting to work with people who were long-term unemployed.

== Career ==
For a period, Rasmussen worked with long-term unemployed people. She has worked as a Partnership Manager for Reed, a UK-based employment agency, since August 2014. She is a board member of several groups, including South Liverpool Homes, Speke Community Pensioners Group and Speke Adventure Playground.

=== Liverpool City Council ===
Rasmussen was elected as a Liverpool City Councillor in May 2007, succeeding Councillor Doreen Knight of the Labour Party. She defeated Paula Keaveney of the Liberal Democrats and received 57.1% of the vote. She has since been re-elected three times, most recently in 2019 with 79.8% of the vote.

She has served as Chair of Liverpool City Council's Labour Group and as the group's Chief Whip, the first woman to hold the position.

Rasmussen was sworn in as Lord Mayor of Liverpool on 28 May 2021 at Liverpool Tennis Centre owing to COVID-19 social distancing requirements. She chose her son, Michael, to serve as Consort and her daughter, Janine, to serve as Lady Mayoress. As Lord Mayor, she opted to sponsor The Whitechapel Centre, Tom Harrison House and Speke Training and Education Centre. Her first term ended in May 2022.

On 17 May 2023, Rasmussen was again sworn in as Lord Mayor of Liverpool to serve for a one year period in the largely ceremonial role.

== Personal life ==
Rasmussen has two children: Michael, a maths teacher, and Janine. Her daughter Lian died in 2020.
