= Damon Grant =

Fictional character from the Channel 4 soap opera Brookside

- Brookside character
- Portrayed by: Simon O'Brien
- Duration: 1982–1987
- First appearance: November 1982
- Last appearance: 27 October 1987
- Created by: Phil Redmond
- Spin-off appearances: Damon and Debbie (1987)
In-universe information
- Father: Bobby Grant
- Mother: Sheila Grant
- Sisters: Karen Grant; Claire Grant
- Half-brothers: Barry Grant
- Sons: Simon McGrath
- Uncles: Richard
- Aunts: Margaret Jefferson; Claire; Brenda
- Nephews: Stephen Pearson
- First cousins: Matthew Jefferson; Helen Jefferson

Damon Grant is a fictional character in the defunct British soap opera Brookside, played by Simon O'Brien. The character was part of the initial cast, appearing from episode one in 1982 until 1987. At the time of the soap's inception, Damon was the youngest son of Bobby (Ricky Tomlinson) and Sheila Grant (Sue Johnston), with an older brother, Barry (Paul Usher), and older sister, Karen (Shelagh O'Hara).

== Storylines ==
Damon was introduced after having broken into the Collins' house in the first episode on 2 November 1982, aged 14. When questioned by Paul Collins (Jim Wiggins) about the theft of a lavatory and vandalism that had occurred, Bobby lashes out at Damon. Barry defends Damon after the occurrence, pointing out that he did not have the tools to remove the lavatory in the way it had been done and that the graffiti could not have been Damon either as "he only spells 'bollocks' with one 'l'".

== Social commentary ==
The Brookside soap opera was regarded as tackling social issues, and this was no less true when dealing with the Grant family, and Damon. One of the first of the show's many teenage characters to capture the viewing public's imagination, the role saw O'Brien catapulted to fame as a teen heart throb, and his adoption of the "mullet" hairstyle proved to be in keeping with the fashion of the times, and saw the character further entrenched as a cultural reference point.

Storylines saw Damon presented initially as a cheeky, lovable character, with a close group of friends. The manner of Grant's characterisation, both by the writers, directors and by O'Brien, led Jane Root, writing in Open the Box: About Television, to cite the character as evidence of "complex male characters and masculine storylines". Root saw this focus as different from established soap operas.

As the character grew older and left school, the writers used storylines to comment on life in Thatcher's Britain. Unemployment was a serious social issue, especially in a dock city such as Liverpool, and Damon struggled to find work. Eventually he took a position as a painter and decorator through the recently introduced YTS scheme, the writers depicting the excitement and later despair when Damon's participation failed to lead to a full-time job to great effect.

=== Damon and Debbie ===
Damon Grant, played by Simon O'Brien, presenting on screen girlfriend Debbie McGrath (Gillian Kearney) with roses. This storyline has come to culturally define the character.

The character was then shown to develop a relationship with Debbie McGrath, played by Gillian Kearney. McGrath was an underage school girl, and the relationship caught the heart of viewers. When O'Brien decided to leave the show, the producers of Brookside decided to spin this plotline into a separate show, Damon and Debbie, broadcast in a later timeslot than that in which Brookside was shown.

This three part series, credited as the first 'soap bubble'. moves the character out from Liverpool in search of work. In the first episode the couple squat on a boat on the River Ouse in York, in the second episode they move to Morecambe and then Bradford, where Damon gets a job as a groundsman at Valley Parade (the stadium of Bradford City football club) before they finally return to York in the third episode. Ultimately, the character is stabbed by two unidentified assailants, and dies at the end of the series. O'Brien had specifically requested that Damon be killed off, yet the move sparked upset and outrage amongst fans of the show, and added to both Brookside's fame and notoriety.

=== Legacy ===
Within the Brookside show the character's death was used as a catalyst for again exploring a number of issues, including the grief of the character's mother, played by Sue Johnston, and that of the character's father, Bobby Grant, played by Ricky Tomlinson, who was shown as blaming the death upon his unemployment. Ultimately, Damon's death led to the splintering of the Grant family within Brookside.

The character's funeral was watched by 7 million viewers, against Channel 4's record rating of 8.4 million set in 2005, and in The Daily Mirror, critic Clare Raymond claimed it to be one of the "most touching soap scenes". In 2001, Jim Shelley, writing for The Observer, claimed the character's death to be one of two contenders for the moment where it all went wrong for Brookside, while in 2002, with the announcement that Brookside was to end, the funeral scene was listed as the fourth greatest episode in the soap's history by The Daily Mirror. In 2003, producer Phil Redmond discussed plans to continue the show through a series of DVD's, with one planned storyline involving '"Brookside's greatest untold story" -what would happen if Barry caught up with Damon's killers.' Francesca Babb from All About Soap included Damon's death in their "most memorable moments" of Brookside feature. She added that Damon and Debbie were "star-crossed young lovers" whose storyline took a "Romeo & Juliet style twist" as they ran away to York.
