= Oglet =

Coordinates: 53.329594°N 2.8450443°W

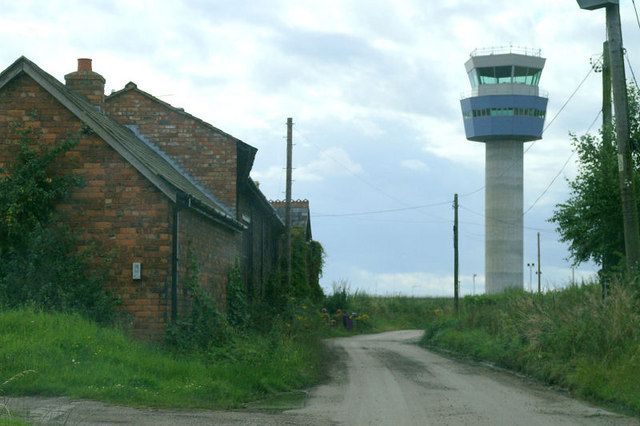
- View along Oglet Lane.

- Location within Merseyside
- OS grid reference: SJ43768169
- Metropolitan borough: City of Liverpool
- Metropolitan county: Merseyside
- Region: North West
- Country: England
- Sovereign state: United Kingdom
- Post town: LIVERPOOL
- Postcode district: L24
- Dialling code: 0151
- Police: Merseyside
- Fire: Merseyside
- Ambulance: North West
- UK Parliament: Liverpool Garston

Oglet is a small area of Liverpool, England, and the city's most southernly point. The area is entirely rural and virtually unpopulated, save for a couple of farms. For most of its known history, Oglet was classed as a hamlet in the township of Speke. Nowadays however, "Oglet" or "The Oglet" is typically used in reference to the entire area of land (which includes the remainder of the hamlet) located sandwiched between Liverpool John Lennon Airport in Speke to the north and the River Mersey in all other directions, except for a short land border with Hale to its east.

It has been described as "Liverpool's last piece of countryside"; it is situated on low-lying, flat, mostly arable land featuring field ponds, hedge rows and tree belts, falling sharply to densely vegetated cliffs at the shoreline. Oglet is noted for supporting diverse habitats home to locally rare wildlife, flora, bats, and particularly birds, be it farmland birds, or wading birds which use its saltmarshes for roosting and feeding. Officially, it is designated as an "Undeveloped Coastal Zone" and part of the city's green belt by Liverpool City Council.

== Etymology ==
Oglet is believed to come from the Old English "ac" (oak) and "hlot" (share/portion), or possibly "lece" (watercourse), and hence is often interpreted as a variant of "oak by the water". It emerged from numerous variations in early documents including Ogelot, Oggelot, Ogelote, Oglot, Ogloth, Okelot and Hogolete.

== History ==
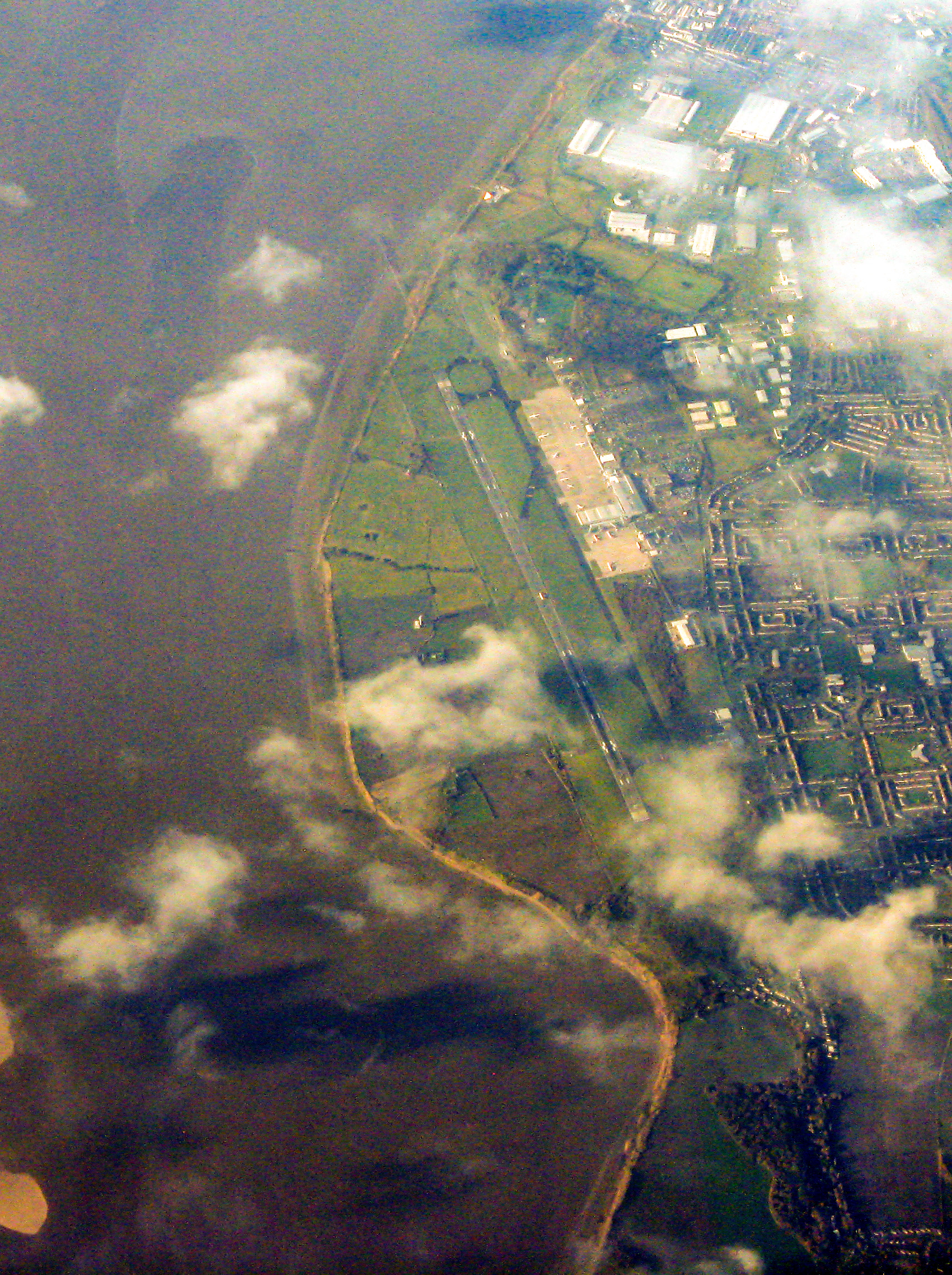
An aerial view of Oglet (land to the left of Liverpool Airport runway).

The earliest known human activity at Oglet is in prehistoric times, possibly Mesolithic and Bronze Age, based upon flint artefacts found in the area. Furthermore, a Roman coin (a Denarius of Septimius Severus) and a brooch are amongst other pre-medieval archaeological discoveries. However, its history does not intensify until the Late Middle Ages.

Based on the etymology of Oglet, it's believed that the area was oak woodland late into the Anglo-Saxon period. Unlike neighbouring Speke, Oglet is not mentioned in the Domesday Book; it first appears by name in written records of the late 1200s. It is thought to be a case of a shrunken medieval village. An abundance of archaeological finds, particularly pottery, as well as evidence of medieval strip fields in the wider proximity of the hamlet, suggests that it was originally a larger settlement during the later Middle Ages that shrunk during the post-medieval period, ending up concentrated on just a single no through road, Oglet Lane. Records from the 14th century through to the 16th century chronicle areas of Oglet being regularly transferred between different local aristocrats of the time, frequently involving the Norris, Molyneux and Ireland families; in 1334, they came together in making Oglet/Speke's eastern boundary official, going by a medieval feature known as the "Ditch of Spek". Many years of agricultural developments have destroyed any evidence of earthworks from those times, however.

Oglet's woodland sections had been partly cleared by the mid 1600s; between 1710 and 1719 it underwent a more intensive period of felling to make way for more areas of farming. By the late 18th century, Oglet had been all but cleared of its woodland. By this time, the hamlet consisted of mostly enclosed pasture fields (many in use since medieval times) and ~10 properties fronting Oglet Lane. The entire township was minute at the start of the 19th century; a mere 37 properties comprised Speke and Oglet in 1811. During this century, the only holdings to survive until the modern day, Yew Tree Farm and Oglet Farm, were established, but Oglet continued to shrink overall; the amount of fields and buildings present in the hamlet had halved by the close of the 1800s.

Aside from agriculture, fishing, especially shrimping, was another key industry in Oglet's past. After the closure of the Dungeon Salt Refinery in the 1840s, fishermen took up permanent residence in the cottages that the refinery workers made vacant. However by the latter half of the 19th century, fishermen at Oglet were a dying breed. Regardless, shrimp remained plentiful, and thus the industry endured on into the early 20th century; it was a common sight to see shrimpers hauling baskets of fish to local markets, such as Garston and Hale.

Both Speke and Oglet remained small settlements at the turn of the century; the population of the entire township was just 381 in the 1901 Census. In 1932, the township was absorbed by the City of Liverpool. Inner-city slum clearance was a priority for the City Council; in 1937, a massive housing project commenced at Speke, vastly expanding it to a town-sized settlement by its completion in the late 1950s. Its architect, Sir Lancelot Keay, purposely avoided including Oglet and the rest of the township's south in the project to ensure some of its historical and geographical character was preserved.

By this time, the pollution of the Mersey had made it uninhabitable for aquatic life, and shrimping at Oglet was described as long over. But with thousands now living just a mile away, the beach at Oglet's shoreline (Oglet Shore, or locally, Oggy Shore), became popular with many locals during the 1950s; as children, future Beatles members and Speke residents, Paul McCartney and George Harrison, frequently played down on the shore and in Oglet's fields.

From 1964 to 1966, a new runway for Liverpool Airport was built on a strip of land directly south of the new Speke estate and north of Oglet. Since its completion, Oglet has been almost completely cut off from Speke, as the runway spans nearly the entire length between the western and eastern shorelines of Oglet's "peninsula". Adding to its isolation, the historic no through road to and from Speke, Oglet Lane, was bisected during this process. A new but circuitous accessway to the hamlet was established via joining Dungeon Lane on the eastern edge of Oglet with the long-time dead end of Oglet Lane; a 17th century cottage situated at the then dead end, "Poverty Nook", was demolished by the Council, leaving just the two current farms left in the area. A new effluent relief system along Oglet Lane was also installed; by 1970, Oglet Shore had become seriously polluted by untreated sewage outfalls and flytipping and thus was no longer a local hotspot. It would take over 30 years for the beach to make a significant recovery, thanks to the efforts of volunteers and improved environmental regulations.

Oglet's 21st century history has been defined by its inclusion in proposals to expand Liverpool Airport which, as adjudged by critics, would effectively see it wiped off the map. In 2002, a new control tower for the airport was constructed in the centre of The Oglet. In 2007, a new expansion masterplan proposed concreting the vast majority of Oglet, transforming it into an airport facility dubbed the "Oglet World Cargo Centre". This plan was superseded in 2017 which dropped the cargo centre concept but maintained the desire to remove green belt status from The Oglet and develop most of its land for new hangars, maintenance services, cargo facilities and warehouses by 2050. The plans were met by fierce backlash from local residents, threatened by the loss of treasured countryside and who rebut the justifications for expansion. In 2019, Dungeon Lane, used as the accessway to Oglet since the late 1960s, was mostly destroyed as part of the creation of a runway end safety area adhering to new CAA regulations. A new route to Oglet's farms was created via Hale; more devious than the last, now involving crossing county borders, this has detached Oglet further still from civilisation.

== Dungeon ==
The former territory of "Dungeon" (later, "Hale Cliff") is often mentioned in the same context as Oglet (despite actually being in Hale). Now an extinct homestead-sized industrial site, it once straddled where the border between Oglet and Hale meets the Mersey and was served by a single no through road from Speke, Dungeon Lane. Likely originating from the Old English Dunge or Denge, meaning land of, or next to, the marsh, it's known that the site featured a wharf and was being used for salt refining by the late 17th century, whilst salthouses and warehouses were funded for construction in 1733.

The salt refinery at Dungeon continued to operate until the 1840s, by which point the homestead also featured a mill and a handful of cottages for its workers on Dungeon Lane. By the 1890s, the refinery site had been repurposed as a stone works, but this was ultimately short-lived. Before the century was out, the wharf was commandeered as a ship-breakers yard, but this too was short-lived, owing to the silting up of the Mersey, and it closed in 1912. By 1925, the buildings had been demolished, save for the cottages. The lack of development since compared to other former salt refinery sites of that era has led to suggestions the place may be of national importance. By ~1990, the old cottages fronting Dungeon Lane were dilapidated and finally knocked down.

Paul McCartney, who spent part of his childhood in Speke, released a solo album entitled The Boys of Dungeon Lane in May 2026.

== Landmarks ==
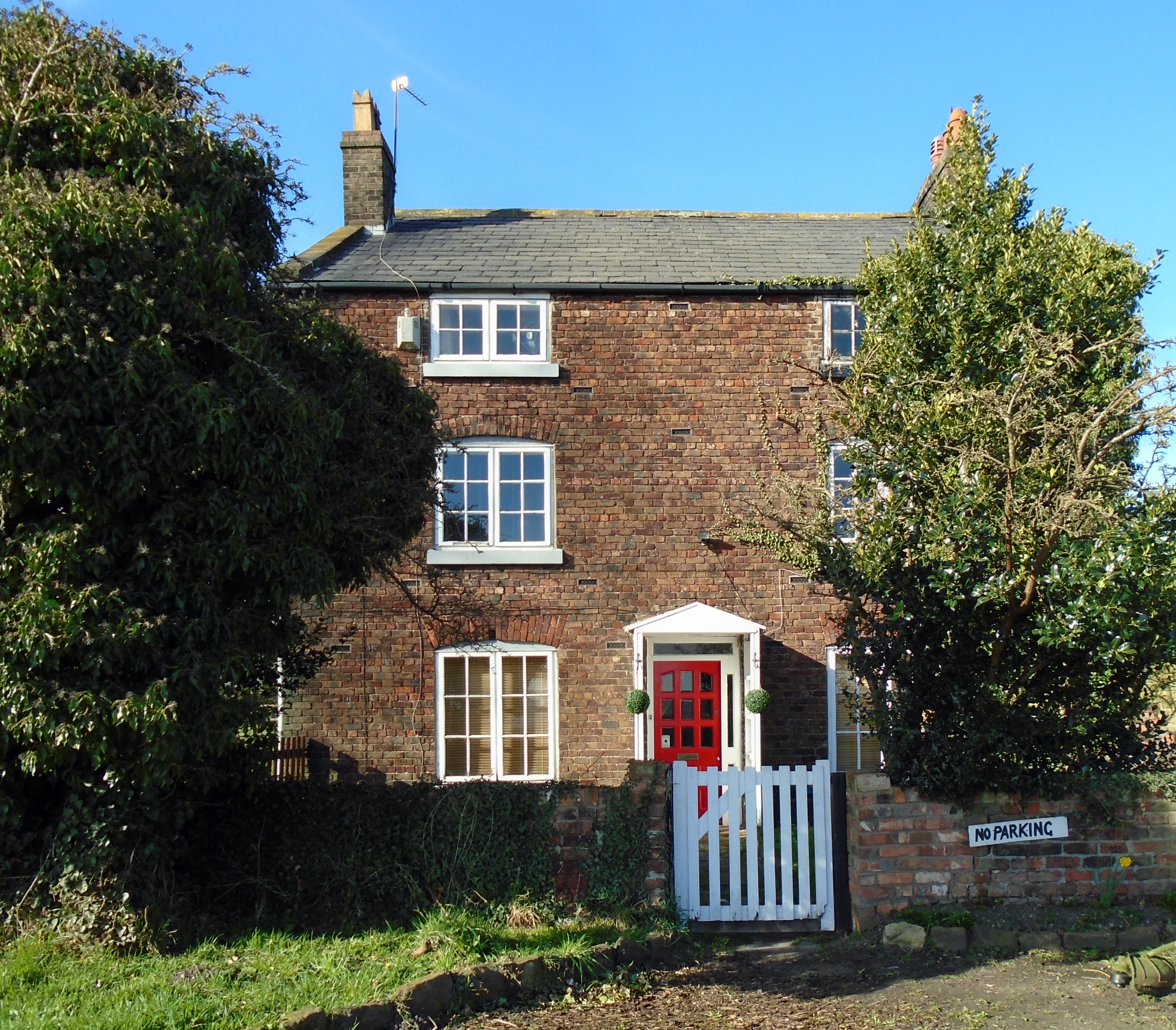
Yew Tree Farmhouse.

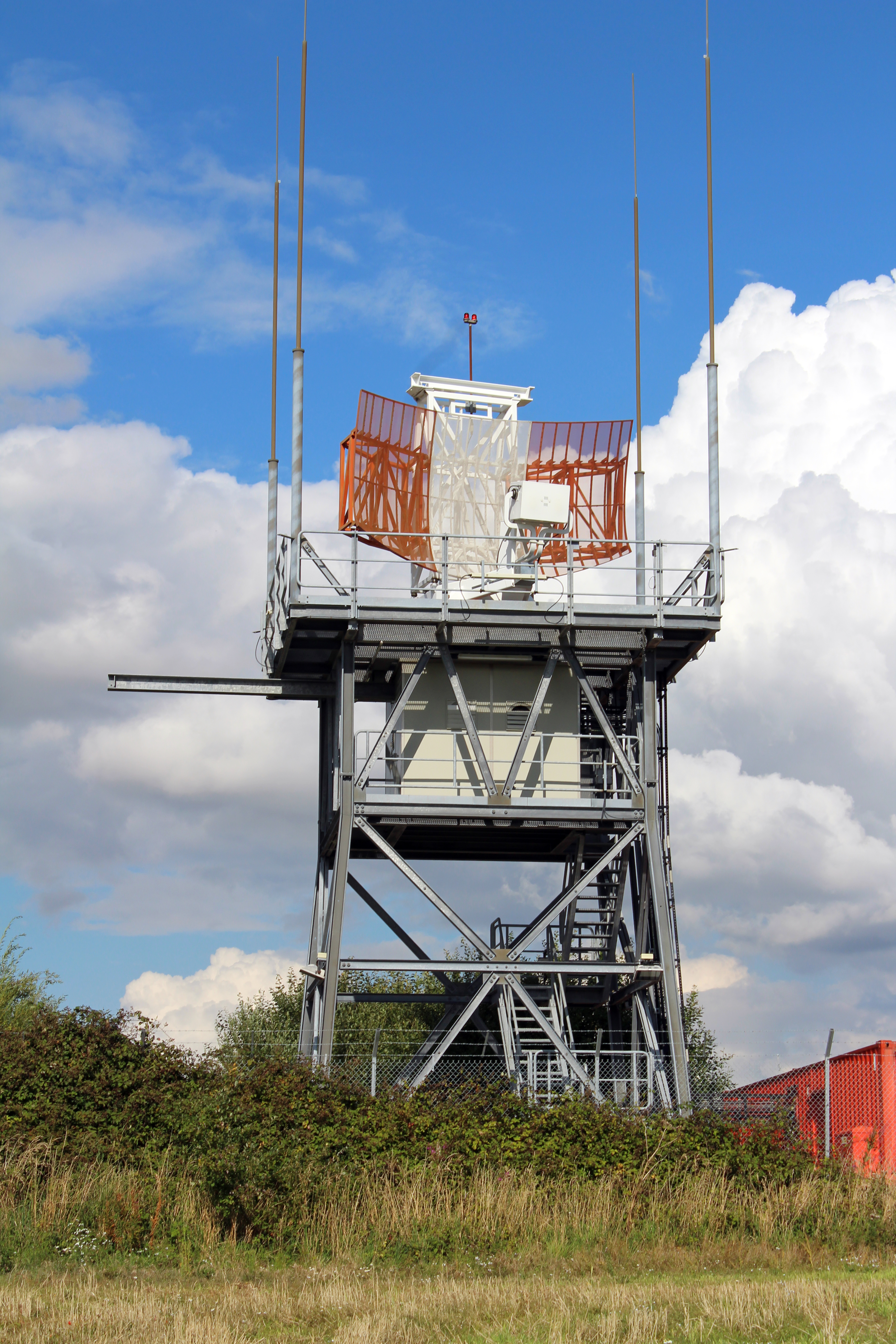
Airport radar tower.

- Dungeon Point
- Dungeon Salt Works ruins
- Liverpool Airport control tower
- Liverpool Airport radar tower
- Oglet Bay
- Oglet Shore
- World War II anti-tank defensives
- Yew Tree Farmhouse (Grade II listed)

== Government ==
In Liverpool City Council elections, Oglet is part of Speke-Garston ward and is represented by councillors Tom Cardwell, Doreen Knight and Mary Rasmussen (all Labour Party; as of 2021).

Oglet is part of the Liverpool Garston constituency and is represented in the House of Commons by Maria Eagle (Labour Party; as of 2026). Eagle visited Oglet Shore in 2018 in her capacity as an MP and endorsed the local campaign to protect its green belt status.

== See also ==
- North West Green Belt
