= St Benedict's College (Liverpool) =

Saint Benedict's College

Location
- Horrocks Avenue; Liverpool, Merseyside, L19 5PF; England; 53.3554°N 2.8887°W

Information
- Religious affiliation: Roman Catholic
- Specialist: Business and Enterprise College
- Department for Education URN: 104710 Tables
- Headteacher: Matthew Davis
- Age: 11 to 18
- Enrolment: 787
- Website: www.saintbenedicts.co.uk

Saint Benedict's College was a Catholic secondary school and sixth form college located in Garston, Liverpool, England. The school was coeducational from years 7 to 11 and included sixth form.

== History ==
Saint Benedict's College was opened in 1955 under the name 'Blessed John Almond' in recognition of local martyr John Almond who was an Allerton resident. In 1971 it was renamed Saint John Almond, this followed John Almond being made a Saint by Pope John Paul II.

== Notable former pupils ==
- Gillian Kearney, actress who played Debbie McGrath in Brookside.
