= Lime Pictures =

British television production company

- Formerly: Mersey Television (1982–2006)
- Type: Subsidiary
- Industry: Television production
- Founded: 1982; 44 years ago
- Founder: Phil Redmond
- Headquarters: Liverpool, United Kingdom
- Key people: Claire Poyser and Kate Little (Joint Managing Directors); Mirella Breda (Chief Creative Officer)
- Products: Television programmes: Grange Hill (1978–2008); Brookside (1982–2003); Damon and Debbie (1987); Hollyoaks (1995–present); The Courtroom (2004); Living on the Edge (2007); Bonkers (2007); Apparitions (2008); The Only Way Is Essex (2010–present); Geordie Shore (2011–present); House of Anubis (2011–2013); Rocket's Island (2012–2015); Celebs Go Dating (2016–present); Free Rein (2017–2019); Zero Chill (2021); Hollyoaks IRL (2021); Wolf King (2025)
- Parent: All3Media (2005–2026); Banijay UK (2026–present)
- Divisions: Wise Owl Films
- Website: limepictures.com

Lime Pictures, formerly known as Mersey Television, is a British television production company owned by Banijay UK, previously owned by All3Media, founded by producer and writer Phil Redmond in the early 1980s. It produces drama and entertainment shows for the international market, including Hollyoaks, The Only Way Is Essex, Geordie Shore and Free Rein.

== History ==
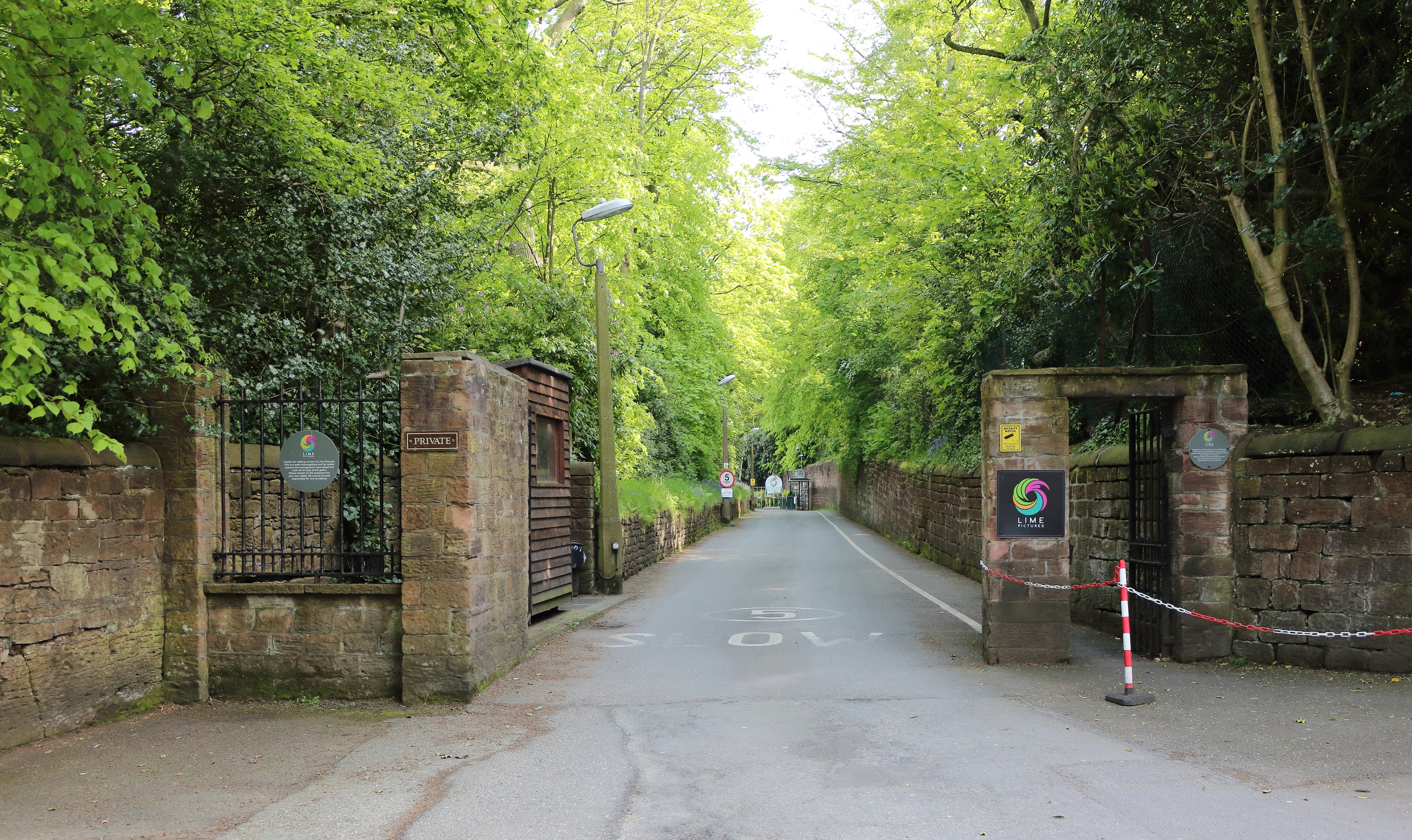
Entrance to Lime Pictures, Childwall, Liverpool

Mersey Television's first major production was the soap opera Brookside for Channel 4, which ran from the channel's foundation in 1982 until 2003, when it was taken off air due to declining ratings. A three-part spin-off ('soap bubble') of Brookside was produced in November 1987, titled Damon and Debbie.

In 1995, the company began producing a second soap opera for Channel 4, Hollyoaks, which still runs.

Both Brookside and Hollyoaks were created by Redmond himself, and in 2003 the company took over production of another series he had created, the children's drama Grange Hill, which had first been broadcast on BBC1 in 1978 and had been made in-house by the BBC until Mersey Television took over. The company moved production of the series to its Liverpool base, with the fictional school no longer being established as in London but instead at an unspecified UK location.

=== North West Television franchise bid ===
In 1991 Mersey Television under the name of North West Television made a strong bid during the ITV network franchise auction to win the Channel 3 licence in the North West England from holders Granada Television. Granada had held the North West franchise ever since the inception of independent television in the 1950s, and Granada was one of the biggest and the most established of the ITV companies. Granada was also a popular production company and it came second only to the BBC to find the most respected British television company amongst the British public.

The bid was supported financially by Yorkshire Television and Tyne Tees Television and the bid had aimed to provide a more balanced television service for the North West, in particular featuring more content from Liverpool as opposed to Manchester. However, although North West Television bid more money for the franchise totalling £35 million as opposed to Granada's £9 million, the licence stayed with Granada because the Independent Television Commission declared that the Mersey Television bid did not meet the required quality threshold.

Furthermore, Granada was aware of Mersey Television's attempts to gain the North West franchise, and built defences to avoid the loss of the licence it had owned for decades. Would-be franchise-holders that had no experience of owning an ITV franchise (Mersey Television was one such example) would have to a pass a "quality hurdle" that executives from the existing ITV companies, including Granada, actually helped the ITC to adopt. Granada also had a well-known catalogue of productions including Prime Suspect, Cracker, World in Action and Coronation Street and if Mersey Television had gained the franchise, then Granada could have sold these to satellite television, the existing and new ITV companies or even the BBC however it did not happen.

=== Acquisition by All3Media ===
By 22 June 2005, British production group All3Media had brought Mersey Television, the acquisition of Mersey Television had gained All3Media's entry into the scripted production genre as Mersey Television became a subsidiary of All3Media and, in a contractual requirement, renamed as Lime Pictures in 2006. Since then the company has produced the following series:

- In 2007, Lime Pictures produced an eight-part series called Living on the Edge, documenting the real lives of a group of teenagers in Cheshire, which was shown on MTV.
- In 2007, it produced the short-lived ITV sitcom Bonkers.
- In 2008, it produced the first (and so far, only) series of Apparitions, starring Martin Shaw as an exorcist.
- In 2009, it produced the BBC Switch reality drama The Season filmed in Val-d'Isère.
- In 2010, Lime Pictures produced a pilot episode for the E4 sitcom Sex and the Chippy, written by Heather Robson and Neil Jones.
- Since 2010, Lime Pictures has produced the award-winning reality series The Only Way Is Essex for ITV2.
- Through 2011 to 2013, Lime Pictures, along with Nickelodeon Productions and Studio 100, produced House of Anubis, which aired on Nickelodeon.
- From 2011 to 2022, Lime Pictures produced Geordie Shore for MTV in the UK and Ireland.
- From 2011 to 2014, Lime Pictures produced Rocket's Island for CBBC.
- From 2014 to 2016, The Evermoor Chronicles were produced for Disney Channel.
- Since 2016, Lime Pictures has produced Celebs Go Dating for E4.
- In 2017, it began producing Free Rein for Netflix.
- In 2021, they produced Hollyoaks IRL for Channel 4. The series has been nominated for a BAFTA TV award, in the Short-form Programme category.
- In 2022, it began producing Wolf King for Netflix.

In February 2008 when Lime Pictures' long-running soap opera Hollyoaks entered HD production, Lime Pictures had upgraded its in-house post-production facility unit with the launch of its HD production facilities which would be supplied by Data Direct Networks and had started its operations four months later in June of that year.

In November 2018, Lime Pictures expanded its operations into Leeds and had partnered with former Shiver founder Mark Johnson to form a non-scripted production subsidiary based in Leeds entitled Wise Owl Films with Mark Johnson became its president of Lime Oictures' new lroduction subsidiary Wise Owl Films.

In September 2019, Lime Pictures' parent All3Media had brought the former together with its fellow London-based factual production subsidiary Lion Television (which All3Media had brought it in 2004), with Lime Pictures folded Lion Television's London-based production office into the former own London-based production office while Lion's managing directors & co-founders Richard Bradley and Nick Catliff became CCOs and joined Lime Pictures' London production office while Lion Television continued operating as it became a label under Lime's Londom office.

In September 2024, Lime Pictures had shuttered its London production office with Lime Pictures transferring its unscripted productions that were formerly produced by its London office such as The Only Way Is Essex and Celebs Go Dating to All3Media's fellow production subsidiary Objective Media Group (whom Lime Pictures had previously produced Fresh Meat with them) via the latter's new unscripted label Objective Entertainment with Lime Pictures's joint managing directors of Lime Pictures' London production office Kate Little and Claire Poyser depatured Lime Pictures after 12 years as All3Media's fellow subsidiary Lion TV which was housed at Lime's london office became a separate label, while Rebecca Kenny-Smith who formerly headed Lime's London office had joined Objective Entertainment to head the production takeover of the brands.

== Awards and nominations ==
| Year | Award | Category | Nominee(s) | Result | Ref. |
|---|---|---|---|---|---|
| 2018 | NAACP Image Awards | Outstanding Children's Program | Free Rein | Nominated | |
| 2018 | Daytime Emmy Awards | Outstanding Children's or Family Viewing Series | Free Rein | Won | |
| 2022 | BAFTA TV Awards | Short Form Programme | Hollyoaks IRL | Nominated | |
| 2022 | Broadcast Awards | Best Digital Support for a Programme | Hollyoaks | Won | |
| 2022 | British Soap Awards | Best British Soap | Hollyoaks | Nominated | |
| 2022 | Royal Television Society Awards (North West) | Best Digital Creativity | Hollyoaks IRL | Won | |
