= Debbie McGrath =

Fictional character from Brookside

- Brookside character
- Portrayed by: Gillian Kearney
- Duration: 1986–1989
- First appearance: 30 December 1986
- Last appearance: 25 January 1989
- Spin-off appearances: Damon and Debbie (1987)
In-universe information
- Father: Tom McGrath
- Mother: Bridget McGrath
- Sons: Simon McGrath
- Uncles: Tone; Lonnie; Billy

Debbie McGrath is a fictional character in the Channel 4 soap opera Brookside, played by Gillian Kearney, from 1986 to 1989. The character was Kearney's first television role, and featured in a plot line which launched both actress and character into the national consciousness.

Debbie McGrath was introduced into the soap as Damon Grant's (Simon O'Brien) girlfriend. She was both younger than Damon and under the age of consent, two facts which caused friction between the parents of both characters, a plot-line which saw one critic refer to it as like "Romeo and Juliet in trackies". When their parents objected to them dating, the couple decided to elope in a story shown in the first UK 'soap bubble', Damon and Debbie. According to Annie Leask of The Sunday Mirror, the spin-off was a result of the characters' popularity with the viewing public. The events of the spin-off show saw Damon murdered, and Debbie returning briefly to the show, where it was revealed she was carrying Grant's baby. After the birth of her son, Simon, she made a brief return to the Close to introduce her child to his grandmother, Sheila (Sue Johnston), before departing for university.

Francesca Babb from All About Soap stated that Damon and Debbie were "star-crossed young lovers" whose storyline took a "Romeo & Juliet style twist" as they ran away to York.
