= Simon O'Brien (presenter) =

British TV actor and radio presenter (born 1965)

- Born: 19 June 1965 (age 60); Liverpool, England
- Occupations: Actor, radio presenter, property developer
- Spouse: Liz O'Brien
- Children: 1
- Website: http://www.simonobrien.com

Simon O'Brien (born 19 June 1965) is a British television actor and radio presenter, as well as a property developer, from Liverpool, England. He is known for his role in the soap opera Brookside from 1982 to 1987 and for presenting on a number of different television shows.

== Early life ==
Simon O'Brien was born in Liverpool on 19 June 1965. He attended Highfield Comprehensive School in Liverpool.

== Career ==
He came to prominence as the character Damon Grant in Brookside, a role he played from the soap's launch in 1982 until 1987, when his character was killed off in York at the end of the Damon and Debbie "soap bubble". In 1989, O'Brien appeared in the British version of Jim Henson's Fraggle Rock until 1990. He portrayed the Lighthouse Keeper called BJ.

In the 1990s, after a spell presenting BBC football show Standing Room Only and a regular role on the American sitcom Out All Night, he left show business and, with Alan Bate, set up Liverpool Cycle Centre, a combination of vegetarian café, cycle shop, cycle parking and other resources relevant to his enthusiasm for cycling. O'Brien then moved into property development. He has since returned to acting and presenting, with a short-lived football quiz show, Do I Not Know That?, on ITV Digital, co-presenting the BBC One show To Buy or Not to Buy, as well as playing caretaker Wally Scott in Grange Hill from 2003.

O'Brien presented BBC Radio Merseyside's breakfast show with Lucinda Moore from September 2006 until 25 June 2007, when he resigned after the accidental broadcast of a promotional preview clip of a forthcoming radio show of him saying "fuck the government, fuck the planners". In 2014, O'Brien began presenting the TV reality series My Dream Derelict Home, before moving on to Find It, Fix It, Flog It in 2016 with fellow presenter Henry Cole, for Channel 4.

In 2022, O'Brien appeared on the ITV soap opera Coronation Street as guest character Frank Bardsley.

== Personal life ==
In 2014, O'Brien was appointed chair of the Liverpool Green Strategy Group. He and his wife Liz, a teacher, have one daughter.
