= George Jackson (Brookside) =

Fictional character from the Channel 4 soap opera Brookside

- Brookside character
- Portrayed by: Cliff Howells
- Duration: 1983–1984
- First appearance: 2 February 1983
- Last appearance: 30 October 1984
- Created by: Phil Redmond
In-universe information
- Occupation: Firefighter
- Wife: Marie Jackson
- Sons: Gary Jackson; Little George Jackson
- Uncles: Walter

George Edward Jackson is a fictional character from the British Channel 4 soap opera Brookside, played by Cliff Howells. The character debuted on-screen during the episode broadcast on 2 February 1983. George was introduced as the brother-in-law of established character Petra Taylor (Alexandra Pigg), following the death of her husband, Gavin Taylor (Daniel Webb). Writers soon introduced viewers to the remainder of The Jackson family, including his wife Marie Jackson (Anna Keaveney), their sons Little George (Allan Patterson), Gary (Steven Patterson), and his sister-in-law Michelle Jones (Tracy Jay). George, a firefighter, is portrayed as easy-going and unassuming.

Producers featured George in a criminal injustice storyline in which he is imprisoned for a warehouse robbery he did not commit. George is framed for the crime by a gangster, Tommy McArdle (Malcolm Tierney) and his associate Victor Scott (Robbie Dee). Writers created a fictional campaign titled "Free George Jackson", which is started by Marie. With legal help, she attempts to have her husband freed from prison via the publicity it generates. The story was popular with viewers and Brookside's production company Mersey Television tried to capitalise on the story's popularity by created a real life campaign. They funded thousands of posters, created t-shirts, badges and banners. They created an information telephone number for viewers to receive updated information on the campaign and released a commercial song via an LP vinyl and radio play.

Howells left the series when George was imprisoned. He was unhappy with the campaign's publicity and producer's using his image on posters without his consent. Howells sought help from the actors union Equity, who helped him build a case against Mersey Television. They changed the posters and despite the campaign being well known nationally in the United Kingdom, George was not released from prison. In the story, he was transferred to a Leeds prison and Marie and their children left Brookside following the actors being written out. The "Free George Jackson" campaign gained infamy and become one of the show's most recognised storylines.

== Development ==
=== Introduction ===
George made his first appearance on 2 February 1983. He comes to console his grieving sister-in-law Petra Taylor (Alexandra Pigg) following the death of her husband, Gavin Taylor (Daniel Webb). Writers created a new family unit, The Jacksons, all who were related to the established character Petra. The family consisted of George, his wife Marie Jackson (Anna Keaveney), their sons Little George Jackson (Allan Patterson), Gary Jackson (Steven Patterson) and Michelle Jones (Tracy Jay), who was Petra and Marie's younger sister. They all move onto Brookside Close following Petra's disappearance. George is portrayed as a firefighter. George is characterised as an "easy going" man who enjoys drinking bitter at the local pub and participating in quizzes. In the book, "Life in the Close", author Geoff Tibballs described George as an "unassuming man" and a heroic character.

=== Criminal Injustice Storyline ===
Producers created a high-profile injustice storyline for George, exploring a wrongful conviction and imprisonment. The plot begins when George encounters local gangster Victor Scott (Robbie Dee) at The Swan pub and they get talking. George discusses a fire at a warehouse and draws a diagram of the premises to better explain it to Victor. Unbeknownst to George, Victor intends to use the diagram to help his boss, Tommy McArdle (Malcolm Tierney) burgle the warehouse. The warehouse is robbed and thousands of pounds worth of cigarettes and alcohol are stolen. McArdle decides to frame George for the robbery. George's diagram leads to police charging him with the robbery. Victor forces Barry Grant (Paul Usher) and Terry Sullivan (Brian Regan) to provide him with an alibi. Marie is furious to discover George has been set up by McArdle and blames Barry and Terry for helping. They cannot help because they know that McArdle will seek revenge.

Leading up to George's trial, the story gained viewer interest as writers teased George's fate. Show creator Phil Redmond recalled that he was pulled over by a police officer and asked if George would be convicted of the crime. Redmond told the officer to keep watching to find out. In September 1984, Roy West from Liverpool Echo reported that George was likely to end up being sent to prison in the story and Howells written out of the show. A report published in The Sunday People revealed a similar outcome. Howells responded and refused to reveal the verdict of George's trial. Brookside's publicity officer Paul Kerr revealed that any personal from Mersey Television disclosing George's storyline details would face disciplinary action.

The story progresses with George's neighbour, Annabelle Collins (Doreen Sloane) paying the money to have him released on bail. George visits McArdle at the local pub and tries to reason with him, which results in George getting violently attacked. When McArdle later encounters George in a street, he warns him to accept any sentence given to him in court and promises to look out for his family's interests. George then saves a boy from drowning and the local newspapers brand him a hero. The incident gave George a new positive outlook as he goes to trial. Barry and Terry also try to make a deal with the police to implicate McArdle and help George - but they are later badly beaten for their interfering. George attends court in formal clothing provided by Paul Collins (Jim Wiggins). Despite all of this, George is found guilty and sentenced to eighteen months in prison. Keaveney believed that Marie and George's dynamic worked well through the storyline as she became an anchor of support for him. Keaveney told Eleanor Levy from Record Mirror that "they're very much in love, the relationship between us worked because although she was a nag, he needed that. Although George was very kind and straight and good, there was a kind of emotional weakness in him that needed someone as strong as Marie to keep him going. It was a lonely Christmas though."

=== "Free George Jackson" Campaign ===
Marie cannot bear the injustice of George's conviction and begins a campaign to have her husband released, titled "Free George Jackson". Marie gets the help of a journalist Rick Sexton (Jeffrey Longmore), there is a visit to Downing Street and a protest in Liverpool when a Member of Parliament visits the city. The "Free George Jackson" campaign gained considerable interest from viewers and began to blur reality and fiction. Graffiti protesting George's innocence began appearing across bus shelters in the UK. Viewers made "Free George Jackson" banners to convince the general public to get involved. The Brookside press office received a cake with a file about George's innocence hidden in-between the layers. The office also received more than five thousand calls from concerned viewers about George's wrongful conviction. A Birmingham pub also ran a campaign event on their premises.

Brookside producers decided to use the public interest in the campaign to their advantage. Brookside was already gaining viewers in excess of six million and they wanted to grow this audience share further. Publicity officer Kerr revealed that they were organising a real life campaign for viewers to continue to enjoy. He told Carolyn Taylor from Liverpool Echo that "everyone knows he doesn't exist, it's just a bit of fun. Hopefully we'll get everyone watching Brookside." A song titled "Free George Jackson" was recorded by the Blazing Saddles, a fictional band George was part of. It was released as a seven inch vinyl single, featured the Brookside theme tune as a B side and gained airplay on British radio after producers contacted stations asking them to play it.

A telephone number was then set up with the help of telecommunications company BT. The helpline was for viewers to call to receive the latest news on George's campaign. It featured pre-recorded voice messages and Liverpool Echo's Taylor revealed that upon calling the number she learned that George was feeling depressed in prison. The show's broadcaster, Channel 4 also hoped to gain profit from the heightened interest. Mersey Television funded the printing of one thousand posters. These featured a photograph of an imprisoned George in a despondent mood with the "Free George Jackson" slogan. It also included the "Free George Jackson" telephone number. In addition they created "Free George Jackson" badges and T-shirts. The campaign was alleged to cost £50,000 and at the time, was the biggest and most expensive British publicity campaign ever funded by an independent television company. Redmond was annoyed that newspapers reported leaked information regarding their plans to launch a real campaign. The leak was first published in an exclusive by The Sunday People. The posters were distributed and placed around the UK in public spaces. In Nottingham for example, the posters were put in were displayed in streets, a bus station and a shopping centre. Publicity officer Kerr told Caroline Stringer from the Nottingham Post that he expected his office to be inundated with fresh calls following the publicity stunt. Fifty-three posters were displayed in Birmingham. Days later the campaign had spread to the British northern regions of Tyne Tees and the Scottish Borders with posters appearing there. Actors whose characters were responsible for George's conviction began to receive threats from the public. Robbie Dee (Victor) was confronted in a fish and chip shop by two men and a woman hit him with an umbrella, but escaped without injury. Tierney was also threatened by a viewers in a street. By 16 January 1985, the helpline was receiving 3500 daily callers checking up on the progress. When Patricia Powell from the Derby Telegraph called the number, she was informed that George felt "deserted and alone". British singer Boy George also became a supporter of the campaign.

The campaign was not welcomed everywhere. Brookside producers wanted to use the "Free George Jackson" song in the opening credits. The British broadcast regulatory body, Independent Broadcasting Authority refused the production's plans to use the song because it had been sold as a commercial single for £1.25. They were also annoyed that permission was not sought in advance. The British mail company, Post Office also had a grievance with the soap opera because of the volume of mail orders of the record. They would only handle the burden if Brookside set up a special box number.

When George was sent to prison, Howells left the series. He was upset with the storyline and campaign because he thought it could affect his acting career. He believed people would think he himself was in trouble with the police. Howells was also annoyed that his face was being displayed on posters nationwide without his consent. Howells decided to complain to the British trade union for the performing arts and entertainment industries, Equity. They too disliked the storyline and campaign and tried to threaten its existence by contacting lawyers. Kerr confirmed that as of 5 January 1985, Equity had not managed to harm the campaign. A report published in The Stage claimed that Equity could take a court injunction out against Mersey Television. After the controversy, Mersey Television scrapped the original posters. They distributed posters with an updated image of George, with his back turned to the camera and his face not displayed. The new image was created using a body double posing as George. A Brookside publicist claimed the change was to reflect George turning his back on the fictional campaign. In the storyline, Marie discovers George has been involved in trouble prison, jeopardising his future. The publicist claimed the change was nothing to do with Equity's legal action. The posters with the double had been created at the same time as the more controversial design. A portion of these posters were accidentally distributed at the same time, confirming Brookside's claim they were not changing tactics to appease Equity. Producers also stated they acted under Equity guidelines by not paying or informing Howells about his image being used. An anonymous cast member told reporters from The Sunday People that Howells had argued with producers over the matter and other cast feared they could receive the same treatment as Howells.

=== Departure ===
On 26 January 1985, it was confirmed that Howells and Keaveney were being written out of Brookside permanently. Howells had already secured theatre work. Keaveney decided to leave and informed producers in July 1984. Ian Brandes from The Sunday People reported that Redmond originally tried to convince Howells to remain in Brookside, but this was unlikely because of their dispute. Writers created a conclusion for the storyline in which the entire Jackson family depart Brookside in April 1985. McArdle begins to threaten Marie for campaigning for George's release. A brick thrown through Marie's window and her son Little George is hit with a pellet from an airgun. Despite the campaign, George is not released and moved to a prison in Leeds. Marie decides to leave Brookside Close to be closer to George, and allow Gary and Little George to visit their father. Keaveney revealed that newspapers reporting details of her and Howells' departures ruined the outcome of the "Free George Jackson" storyline. She told a Liverpool Echo reporter that "the story of George and Marie has been spoilt for fans of the serial." By December 1985, posters were still displayed after the campaign ended. Viewers continued to write letters to the show asking if George would be freed from prison and return to the show.

== Reception ==
A reporter from The Sunday People described George as "one of the show's best loved characters". Another branded George a "homely" character and the "Free George Jackson" story a "zippy" campaign. Peter Brown from the Lincolnshire Echo included George's trial in their "TV highlights" feature. Carolyn Taylor from Liverpool Echo stated that the "Free George Jackson" campaign was "spreading like wildfire around the country. No-one will be able to escape the fact that George, languishing in Liverpool's Walton jail, is innocent." Inside Soap ran a feature compiling "The 100 greatest soap stories ever told". They featured the "Free George Jackson" story as their fifty-third choice. The Guide Liverpool featured the story in their compilation of ten significant Brookside storylines that "got everyone talking". Frances Traynor from Daily Record included it second in her feature compiling Brookside's twenty-one classic moments. In the book, "The Guinness Book of Classic British TV", Brookside was praised for its authentic portrayal of George's legal case. It was noted that "George's remand, trial and conviction followed an accurate time-scale - and against the rules of popular drama - he was imprisoned, leading to a lengthy 'George Jackson is innocent' campaign." Tom O'Riordan Sunday Mercury branded it a "courageous campaign" that "took centre stage in the national attention".

A writer from the Hull Daily Mail branded George "one of the Close's most popular residents" and his unfair imprisonment a "sensational storyline". Lorna Hughes from Liverpool Echo included George's imprisonment in her forgotten storylines list. Hughes believed that the armed siege that occurred the following year "overshadowed this somewhat". She added that it was an early equivalent to Coronation Street's "Free Deirdre" storyline. Roy West from the publication assessed "the saga of George - a nice bloke who gets mixed up some nasty characters - is typical Brookside." West also bemoaned Howells and Keaveney's departures from the series, noting "the bottom fell out of the George Jackson saga" once they left. He also opined the story created "lots of drama" and thought it was the first time a soap opera character was written out of a series by being sent to prison. Derby Telegraph's Patricia Powell was not a Brookside viewer and when she encountered a "Free George Jackson" poster in Derby, she presumed he was a real person from her local area convicted of a crime. Powell's colleague had to explain that George was fictional and she ran an article on the campaign. Powell described the campaign stunt as "pretty incredible" for a non-viewer.
