= Marie Jackson =

Fictional character from Brookside

- Brookside character
- Portrayed by: Antonia Mallen (1983); Anna Keaveney (1983–1985)
- Duration: 1983–1985
- First appearance: 8 February 1983
- Last appearance: 18 June 1985
- Created by: Phil Redmond
In-universe information
- Father: Davey Jones
- Sisters: Petra Taylor; Michelle Jones
- Husband: George Jackson
- Sons: Little George Jackson; Gary Jackson
- First cousins: Ronnie

Marie Jackson is a fictional character from the British Channel 4 soap opera Brookside, played by Anna Keaveney. The character debuted on-screen during the episode broadcast on 8 February 1983 played by Antonia Mallen for a single appearance. Keaveney took over the role from 2 March 1983. Marie is introduced as the sister of Petra Taylor (Alexandra Pigg) and Michelle Jones (Tracey Jay). She eventually moves onto Brookside Close with her husband George Jackson (Cliff Howells) and their twin children Gary (Steven Patterson) and Little George (Allan Patterson), alongside Michelle, forming the show's Jackson family. Keaveney was originally only intended to appear as Marie in a few episodes but the role was expanded and she joined the show's regular cast. Marie is characterised as strong "battling" character with a "hard as nails" persona. Keaveney believed Marie's personality gave her the ability to take over the scenes she featured in, though she felt all Marie did was moan and complain. In her backstory, Marie endured a tough upbringing and was left to look after her younger sisters after her mother died and her alcoholic father, Davey Jones (Ian Hendry) was absent. Marie's initial storylines revolve around the disappearance of Petra and Marie's search to bring her home. Writers killed-off Petra in a suicide storyline and Marie inherits her house on Brookside Close.

Writers created feuds for Marie with the characters of Barry Grant (Paul Usher) and Sheila Grant (Sue Johnston). Writers created a "famous" fight scene between Marie and Sheila, who brawl on Brookside Close. Another story showcased Marie's tenacity as she fights for her children's rights to be enrolled in a private school. Show creator, Phil Redmond recalled the story seemed boring but resonated with viewers who were fighting to better the lives of their family. One of Marie's most prominent storylines occurs when George is imprisoned for a crime he did not commit. Marie begins a campaign to secure his release from prison, which gained traction as the "Free George Jackson" campaign. The plot generated additional interest with viewers and helped bolster Brookside's audience share. Channel 4 supported the storyline with a real life publicity campaign to free George. Posters were put up around the UK, complete with a telephone number that viewers could call to receive fictional updates about the progress of Marie's campaign. The storyline continued with its uptrend in popularity but was ended when both Keaveney and Howells decided to leave the series. In her final storylines, she moves to Leeds to be closer to George and sells her house. She returned for two episodes to accommodate Jay's departure as Michelle. Keaveney made her final appearance as Marie during the episode broadcast on 18 June 1985.

For her performance as Marie, Keaveney was considered for a BAFTA in their shortlists. The character became popular with television critics who favoured her strong characterisation. She has been branded a soap opera "battleaxe" character by numerous critics and many profiled her tough persona. Keaveney's departure surprised journalists because she had been developed into a pivotal character within Brookside. However, one critic "hated" the character for being an unbearable neighbour and "hideous nag".

== Development ==
=== Introduction and characterisation ===
She was first played by Antonia Mallen in a brief non-speaking role, which occurred during episode twenty-nine. Marie was seen supporting her grieving sister Petra Taylor (Alexandra Pigg) following the death of her husband, Gavin Taylor (Daniel Webb). Anna Keaveney played the role following Marie's full introduction from 2 March 1983. Marie is introduced as the sister of Petra and Michelle Jones (Tracey Jay). She eventually moves onto Brookside Close with her husband George Jackson (Cliff Howells) and their twin children Gary Jackson (Steven Patterson) and Little George Jackson (Allan Patterson), alongside Michelle, forming the show's Jackson family. Keaveney was originally only supposed to appear as Marie in a couple of episodes. The role was expanded and Keaveney joined the show's regular cast for eighteen months. Keaveney did not sign long-term fixed contracts with Brookside because she did not want to be restricted by a single role. Keaveney lived in London while she appeared in the series and commuted to Liverpool twice a week. She was born in Runcorn and developed the local Cheshire accent, but she was schooled in Liverpool which helped Keaveney put on a Scouse accent for the role.

Marie's appearance is a woman of short height with short legs but characterised by her short-temper. She is a "battling" character with a "fighting spirit" and "hard as nails" persona, who has endured a "tough life" and "learned to cope with tragedy". In the book, "Phil Redmond's Brookside - Life in the Close", author Geoff Tibballs describes Marie as "Petra's pit-bull terrier of a sister." In the later book, "Total Brookside: The Ultimate Guide to the Ultimate Soap", Tibballs described Marie as "short in temper and stature" and "nothing if not a fighter". He added she is "a graduate from the school of hard knocks" and a character who enjoys arguing with others. In her backstory, Marie had been left to care for her two younger sisters since they were children. Their father is an alcoholic and their mother died when Marie was twelve forcing her to become a substitute mother. Marie is also portrayed as superstitious and in one storyline asks a clairvoyant, Mrs O'Rourke for life advice. Writers also added in the quirk of Marie believing she has physic powers and believed in reading tea leaves. Keaveney knew that when she took on the role, she did not want Marie to be portrayed as an "easy-going neighbour" to the other Brookside characters. Keaveney believed that writers used Marie to disrupt the peaceful dynamic that they had created amongst the established characters. She told Eleanor Levy from Record Mirror that "I think Marie Jackson brought in conflict because everyone was being very nice to each other." Keaveney told Brian Hancill from Daily Post that "Marie was such a strong character, taking over every scene she appeared in." She added that Marie is able to get "her own way" by "shooting her mouth off" at other characters. She also believed that Marie was often portrayed as moaning and complaining during scenes. She told Roy West from Liverpool Echo that "with poor Marie it was moan, moan, moan all the time!"

=== Family and feuds ===
Marie's first prominent storyline was searching for her missing sister, Petra. The Jacksons move into Petra's house while their own home was being refurbished and Petra never returned. Marie spent months trying to locate Petra and put advertisements for her return in the local newspaper. In the show's Christmas episodes on 1983, Marie is depicted setting up an extra place for Petra at the dinner table, convinced she could return home. Marie's optimism appears to be successful when she receives a Christmas card from Petra and she discovers Petra has been cashing cheques in Southport. In January 1984 episodes, Marie is informed that Petra is dead having committed suicide. Marie asks her clairvoyant, Mrs O'Rourke if she should remain at number 10 Brookside Close because she feels a coldness to the premises. She advises Marie to remain and moves back into the house. Roger Huntington (Rob Spendlove) later informs Marie that Petra has left Marie the house in her will plus £2500 every year. This prompts their absent father, Davey Jones (Ian Hendry) to arrive and ask about the will. Hendry was cast by Brookside producer Chris Clough who thought he was ideal for the role of Marie's father. Marie is portrayed as estranged from Davey, makes him feel unwelcome and vows to rid of him. Davey later steals Michelle's catalogue money. In his final scene he is ordered to leave Marie's house and he leaves Brookside Close. Writers created a feud between Marie and Barry Grant (Paul Usher), who she blamed for causing Petra to have a miscarriage and her later disappearance. Writers included Barry's mother, Sheila Grant (Sue Johnston) in the feud which results in a "slanging match" between the two on Brookside Close. Writers portrayed Sheila as needing to protect Barry from "Marie's vitriol". Keaveney addressed the scenes during an interview with Alan Hulme from Manchester Evening News, stating "Marie caused quite a stir", adding that Marie and Sheila's fight became "famous". Keaveney revealed that she and Johnston had fun working together on the story. Other stories in her early tenure include meddling in Michelle's relationship with Terry Sullivan (Brian Regan). She disapproves of their romance because Terry is best friends with Barry. In another story, Marie believes that her children will be better of attending a private school. The plot explores Marie trying to convince a headmaster to allow her sons to attend the school. Despite her newfound wealth, Marie's lower-class background is at odds with the school's cliental and she struggles to convince him. The storyline resonated well with viewers who had similar aspirations to Marie's and the show received letters praising the story. Show creator, Phil Redmond told Roy West from Liverpool Echo that the response surprised him. He added "I had thought it was a bit boring, but the letters showed people were intrigued by the conflict facing working class people who have aspirations."

=== "Free George Jackson" campaign ===
In her most prominent storyline, Marie supports her husband when local gangster, Tommy McArdle (Malcolm Tierney) frames George for a robbery. George had innocently drawn a plan of a warehouse he attended a fire at on a napkin. Tommy commits a robbery at the warehouse and steals cigarettes and alcohol. George is arrested for the crime and the map he drew is used as evidence against him. Writers added optimism to the story when Marie and George have a day out together at the park. George saves a boy from drowning and George is hailed as a hero in the local newspaper. Keaveney told Levy that Marie and George's relationship worked well because the two are "very much in love" and Marie is "a nag" which George needed. She added that "although George was very kind and straight and good, there was a kind of emotional weakness in him that needed someone as strong as Marie to keep him going." George is sent to trial, found guilty and sentenced to eighteen months in prison. Marie begins a campaign to prove her husband's innocence called "Free George Jackson". She enlists the help of a local journalist, Rick Sexton (Jeffrey Longmore) and her friend, Betty Hughes (Paula Tilbrook). Keaveney described "a lonely Christmas" for Marie as she continues family life without George.

Brookside's publicity officer Paul Kerr revealed that the show were organising a real life campaign for to add more interaction with viewers. He told Carolyn Taylor from Liverpool Echo that "everyone knows he doesn't exist, it's just a bit of fun. Hopefully we'll get everyone watching Brookside." The campaign generated "enormous interest" with viewers and Channel 4 decided to back the off-screen campaign publicity stunt to capitalise on the story's success. It was the most expensive publicity campaign created by a British broadcaster at the time. They printed more than one thousand posters, complete with a photograph of George in prison with the "Free George Jackson" slogan. It also featured a telephone line which viewers could call to receive storyline updates about the campaign. The posters were distributed nationwide and were placed in shopping centres and bus stations. Badges and T-shirts with the slogan were also produced and distributed. In addition, the Blazing Saddles released an official music single, on vinyl record, titled "Free George Jackson" to generate further interest. The show was averaging at six million viewers per episode and producers hoped the campaign would bolster their viewership. By January 1985, the show's publicity office had received more than five thousand telephone calls from viewers about the storyline. Howells was also upset with the publicity stunt because he believed it led people to think he had also been in trouble with the law. Howells involved the actors union, Equity, who threatened the campaign in its early stages. A Birmingham pub also ran a campaign event on their premises. It became part of popular culture to the extent that the British singer Boy George also became a supporter of the campaign. Carolyn Taylor from Liverpool Echo stated that the "Free George Jackson" campaign was gained such notoriety that it was "spreading like wildfire around the country." Keaveney told Stuart Gilles from Manchester Evening News that the storyline became "quite a cult", especially in Liverpool. She added that she was "glad" when the story was over.

In the subsequent episodes, Marie's campaign causes disruption during an MP's visit to Liverpool when "Free George Jackson" is painted near the runway at Speke Airport. During the 12 February 1985 episode, Marie and Betty travel to London and visit 10 Downing street with a petition to free George. Her efforts aggravate Tommy who threatens the Jackson family. Little George is shot with a pallet gun in the eye. Marie then begins receiving hate mail brick is thrown through the Jacksons window. Marie also is conflicted when Little George and Gary start being harassed about George at school and get into trouble for fighting. Rick allows a newspaper report to be published in his newspaper portraying Marie as a neglectful mother and the cause of Little George being shot. Marie then begins to receive hate mail from angry parents. Writers continued to add turmoil for Marie's campaign when George temporarily escapes from prison. Tibballs assessed that "Marie began to wilt" and "for once in her life Marie Jackson was beaten" in the face of these issues. Marie reassesses the campaign and later decides to move to Leeds to be closer to George's prison.

=== Departure ===
On 26 January 1985, it was announced that both Keaveney and Howells were being written out of the series. Their departures were confirmed after Howells began rehearsals for a theatre production which the British media became aware of. Keaveney decided to leave the role the previous summer and her choice was kept a secret from viewers so it would not ruin Marie and George's storyline. She told a Liverpool Echo reporter that news about her departure being leaked to the media ruined the storyline for Brookside viewers. She added "once again, it's the poor old audience at home who gets it in the neck." Keaveney explained the main reason she wanted to leave was because she did not want to become typecast as Marie. She had been a jobbing-actor for fifteen years and wanted to continue to play other roles. She also only intended to appear in the series for a set amount of episodes but recalled still being in the role after six months and deliberated whether to continue the role and become a "stick in the mud". Stories published in the British press claimed that Keaveney, who was a union representative, had been involved in the dispute with a show executive and led to her departure. Both Keaveney and Redmond denied the initial news reports that Marie was "axed" from the series. Keaveney noted she wanted to pursue theatre work and Redmond added that she was only contracted from July 1985 to March 1985. He added that Marie's departure came from an amicable decision between those involved. Producers also decided to write out their on-screen children, Little George and Gary too.

In her final stories, after deciding to move closer to George, Marie puts the house up for sale as she prepares to move away. Writers also revisited Marie and Sheila's feud when she agrees to look after Sheila's baby daughter, Claire Grant (Amy Lynch). Marie leaves Claire with Little George and Gary, but another child accidentally scratches Claire. Sheila notices this and confronts Marie who is unable to give Sheila an explanation. In her departure scenes, Marie visits Sheila at a church where Claire is being Christened. Marie mends her feud with Sheila and gifts Claire a silver locket. Marie's initial departure occurred during the episode broadcast on 2 April 1985. Keaveney revealed that any additional appearances would be to "tidy up the storyline" for the Jackson's final scenes. On 14 June 1985, Marie returned to the show. Her appearance was to accommodate Michelle's departure storyline after Jay was axed from the series, following Keaveney and Howells' departures. Her final appearance was broadcast during the 18 June 1985 episode. Keaveney revealed that after she left the role, someone wrote "Free George Jackson" on her car and another man approached her asking about George's welfare. In the book, "Phil Redmond's Brookside - Life in the Close" it details the lives of former Brookside characters away from the main series. In Marie and George's story it is revealed that in 1988, they moved from Leeds to Newcastle upon Tyne. Michelle lives with them intermittently and Little George gets arrested for car theft.

== Reception ==
For her performance as Marie, Keaveney was considered for a BAFTA at the British Academy Television Awards and made it to a shortlist of forty actresses. Journalist Steve Pafford included Marie is a list of Brookside's ten best characters and branded her "the hard-nosed harridan". He profiled Marie and Sheila's fight on Brookside Close, opining that it was a "mahoosive slanging match" as they were "going hammer and tongue like two fishwives". He added it was reminiscent of the "catfights" that were featured in 1960's Coronation Street episodes. Johnny Dee from Record Mirror branded Marie an "infamous" character who moved onto Brookside Close with George and their "terrible twins". He assessed that "things didn't go too well for the Jacksons" during their tenure. Bronwen Balmforth from Titbits stated that 10 Brookside Close was an unlucky house and that Marie "had no luck either" living there. Marie gained a reputation in the British press for being the archetype of a battle-axe character. Sunday People's Felicity Hawkins branded the character a "Brookside battleaxe". Joe Riley assessed that Marie was a "battling" character. A Derby Telegraph writer named her "the battleaxe of Brookside" and a Southport Visiter journalist also labelled her a "battleaxe". Derrick Warren from Coventry Evening Telegraph assessed that Marie is a "hard-boiled and outspoken" character. Frank Sloan from The Herald opted that Marie is a "spitfire-like" character and a The Northern Echo writer labelled her the "loud-mouthed Marie". Stanley Shivas from Daily Record described Marie as a "hard-mouthed but vulnerable tearaway."

Maureen Paton from Daily Express profiled Marie's characterisation. She stated "Marie has to be the most hateful little biddy ever to surface in a soap opera. She is utterly and completely dreadful and must have swelled the ranks of Brookside watchers no end." Paton believed a defining moment for Marie came when she "raged at the snobbish private school" for not allowing her children to enroll. She added that "Keaveney as Marie turned in a brilliantly fervent bit of acting as she ranted and raved against the injustice of it all and got her way. A terrible person to know, but you can just about understand why. It's a bitter struggle of 'have-nots' like her to join the magic circle of the 'haves' that makes the Maries of this world such monsters." Roy West from Liverpool Echo stated that the Jackson family attracted a lot of interest from viewers. He noted that "much of it centred on the mouthy Marie" and praised Keaveney's performance which he perceived as her acting "with the kind of Intensity that must make her Brookside's first real star. Even If most of the letters say how much they hate her." West later opined that Keaveney "has been such a success as Marie Jackson." Ken Irwin, writing for Daily Mirror praised Keaveney's acting performance during George's court trial, branding it "wonderfully moving acting" from her playing the "distraught wife".

Critics from Coventry Evening Telegraph and Lincolnshire Echo included George's trial in their television highlights feature, adding that it gave "tension and tribulation" for Marie and George. In his book, The Who's Who of Soap Operas, author Anthony Hayward branded Marie's campaign to free George "a rallying call for Brookside fans" noting it gained such notoriety it spawned an official music release. Tom O'Riordan Sunday Mercury branded Marie's efforts a "courageous campaign" that "took centre stage in the national attention". Frances Traynor from Daily Record included Marie's campaign second in her feature compiling Brookside's twenty-one classic moments, adding that Marie was George's "shrewish wife". Inside Soap ran a feature compiling "The 100 greatest soap stories ever told". They featured the "Free George Jackson" story as their fifty-third choice. The Guide Liverpool featured the story in their compilation of ten significant Brookside storylines that "got everyone talking". Derby Telegraph's Patricia Powell was unfamiliar with Brookside and when she encountered a "Free George Jackson" poster she presumed it was a genuine campaign until she was told otherwise. Powell described the campaign stunt as "pretty incredible" for a non-viewer.

Alan Air from News and Star was shocked by Keaveney's departure from the show and published an article titled "Save Marie Jackson appeal". He believed her leaving the show was a "scandal" and opined that Keaveney portrayed Marie "superbly". He added Marie is a "fiery character" and is to Brookside what the character of Bet Lynch is to the fellow soap opera, Coronation Street. Air stated that the success of the Free George Jackson storyline was "a tribute to Marie's riveting authenticity." Air concluded that there should have been a new campaign designed to keep Marie in Brookside. Liverpool Echo's West branded Marie's departure a "big event" but thought "the bottom fell out of the George Jackson saga" once Keaveney and Howells' departures were announced. He added his certainty that viewers would miss Keaveney being in the show, but Brookside Close residents would be delighted to "see the back off loud-mouthed Marie." West later stated that Marie is not only "Brookside's biggest moaner", but she is "the world's biggest moaner". He added that she is George's "whingeing wife" who appeared in one of Brookside's "most talked-about storylines". Another Liverpool Echo journalist branded Marie a "fiery Brookside housewife" and noted the Free George Jackson plot secured Brookside their "biggest boost" in viewers. They also predicted an optimistic future for Keaveney's career, because her "success as Marie should ensure plenty of offers rolling in". Daily Post's Brian Hancill praised that "Keaveney was an unforgettable TV presence as Marie Jackson, the pint-sized firebrand who dominated Brookside for two years. The Merseyside soap opera was all the poorer when she left in 1985." Manchester Evening News' Stuart Gilles praised Keaveney's performance, stating "as Marie Jackson, she made a major hit as the wife of wrongfully imprisoned George Jackson." Margaret Forwood from Sunday People disliked Marie to the extent the actress annoyed her. She scathed "I make no bones about it. I hated Anna Keaveney when she played hideous nag Marie Jackson in Brookside, the sort of neighbour who could make you put your house on the market even in a slump."
