= Michelle Jones (Brookside) =

Fictional character from the Channel 4 soap opera Brookside

- Brookside character
- Portrayed by: Tracey Jay
- Duration: 1983–1985
- First appearance: 5 March 1983
- Last appearance: 18 June 1985
- Created by: Phil Redmond
In-universe information
- Occupation: Catalogue agent Barmaid; Beautician
- Father: Davey Jones
- Sisters: Marie Jackson; Petra Taylor
- Husband: Dave Randall (1991)
- Nephews: Little George Jackson; Gary Jackson
- First cousins: Ronnie

Michelle Jones is a fictional character from the British Channel 4 soap opera Brookside, played by Tracey Jay. The character debuted on-screen during the episode broadcast on 15 March 1983. Michelle is introduced as the sister of Petra Taylor (Alexandra Pigg) and Marie Jackson (Anna Keaveney). Jay auditioned for work as an extra on the series but was cast as Michelle. She was originally only intended to appear in two episodes, but this was later extended. She eventually moves onto Brookside Close with Marie and her husband, George Jackson (Cliff Howells) and their twin children Gary Jackson (Steven Patterson) and Little George Jackson (Allan Patterson), forming the show's Jackson family. Michelle is originally portrayed as a meek, bright and cheeky but writers transformed her into a moody and depressed character. Jay believed that during her first year in the series, Michelle was bound to Petra's storylines. In her second year, she viewed Michelle as becoming a more independent character from her on-screen family.

Writers created Michelle's main relationship storyline with Terry Sullivan (Brian Regan). Their romance is difficult due to his friendship with Barry Grant (Paul Usher), who Michelle and Marie blame for Petra's disappearance and suicide. Michelle was often portrayed as being jobless and in her later stories she was displayed as being bored with her life. She begins an affair with her dance teacher, Richard de Saville (Robert Dallas) and Terry soon discovers the truth. Producers decided to write Michelle out of the series in 1985, following the departures of her on-screen family. In her final scenes, Michelle decides to leave Brookside Close and move to Leeds to live with Marie. Jay last appeared as Michelle during the episode broadcast on 18 June 1985.

== Casting ==
Jay had been working in Italy practicing dance to help gain her equity card and upon her return auditioned for Brookside. The role was Jay's first professional acting role. Jay originally auditioned to appear on the show as an extra role but was given the role of Michelle after impressing producers. In her original audition, Jay and another actress were reading for the part when the show's executive producer Phil Redmond came into the room. He asked them to do an improvisation, requesting that Jay play the role of a woman confessing to her best friend that she has had sex with her boyfriend. At the end of the audition, he told Jay "well, you're a bitch." Jay took his remark as complimentary feedback on her acting. She later explained that "Michelle in the beginning she was so meek and so mild, I couldn't really see, it didn't seem to bear any relationship to the audition that I'd done." She was initially contracted to appear as Michelle for only two episodes but this was later extended. The actress is from Formby and put on a Scouse accent for the part. Jay made her first on-screen appearance as Michelle during the episode broadcast on 15 March 1983.

== Development ==
=== Introduction and characterisation ===
Michelle is the sister of Petra Taylor (Alexandra Pigg) and Marie Jackson (Anna Keaveney). Michelle is the youngest sibling and Marie is the eldest. In their backstory, Marie is detailed as bringing both Petra and Michelle up following the death of their mother when they were children. Their father Davey Jones (Ian Hendry) is an alcoholic. Michelle arrives to support Petra following the death of her husband Gavin Taylor (Daniel Webb). Michelle tries to help Petra overcome grief but to no avail. Michelle's early storylines are centric to the Jackson family's many woes including Petra's disappearance and later suicide. In her will, Petra leaves her house on Brookside Close to Marie and Michelle receives a guaranteed yearly payment of £7500. Michelle moves in permanently with the Jacksons which also includes Marie's husband, George Jackson (Cliff Howells) and their twin children Gary Jackson (Steven Patterson) and Little George Jackson (Allan Patterson). Petra's death results in the arrival of Davey but Marie is adamant that their father cannot stay. He eventually leaves and steals Michelle's catalogue money but the sisters are glad about his departure.

Michelle's original storyline was closely tied to Petra's during her first year in the series. In December 1983, Jay told a reporter from Liverpool Echo that writers had begun to develop Michelle beyond her sister's dramas. She explained that initially fan reaction to her always involved questions about Petra, but this was changing. She explained "I think there are signs, though, that Michelle is developing as a character in her own right now." She added that as Michelle forms friendships with other characters on the show, "she seems to be developing a lot more confidence in herself." Jay believed that Michelle's characterisation transformed completely over her tenure. The actress told Roy West from Liverpool Echo that Michelle was originally portrayed as being "quite bright and cheeky" but she gradually becomes "more and more depressed". She admitted that she did not get to smile much in filming Michelle's storylines. She viewed Michelle as not being a positive character and not career minded. She added "Michelle would be happy just to sit at home."

=== Terry Sullivan and departure ===
Writers created a relationship storyline between Michelle and Terry Sullivan (Brian Regan). In the book, "Brookside: The Official Companion", the show's executive producer Phil Redmond detailed that Michelle and Terry were "inseparable" and "romance blossomed" between them. He became a source of support for Michelle during the search for missing Petra. Terry lived in a nearby housing estate when they get together. "Phil Redmond's Brookside - Life in the Close" author Geoff Tibballs wrote that Michelle wanted to change Terry and make him look more presentable. Writers remained committed to portraying a hateful dynamic between Michelle and Terry's best friend, Barry Grant (Paul Usher). She blames Barry for his treatment of Petra prior to her suicide. Terry promises Michelle he will end his friendship with Barry but continues to spend time with him. Writers also showcased Marie's protective nature over Michelle, and she is suspicious of Terry's motives for romancing Michelle and believes he only wants her money. Michelle's involvement with Terry and Barry inadvertently creates a family crisis for the Jacksons. They become involved with local gangster, Tommy McArdle (Malcolm Tierney) who later frames George for a robbery. She then endures Marie's endless pursuit to clear George's name and her "Free George Jackson" campaign, which leaves the Jacksons being terrorised by Tommy. She also invests £2000 into Terry, Barry and Celia Thompson's (Annette Ekblom) tool hire business. She and Terry become engaged and move into a flat together. In the book, "Total Brookside: The Ultimate Guide to the Ultimate Soap", Tibballs wrote that "with their matching perms, Michelle and Terry looked like two bookends, and she showed her belief in him by investing into" the tool-hire business. Writers also explored a storyline in which Michelle wants to become a beautician, which she funds the training for with Petra's money.

In her final stories writers portrayed Michelle as "bored" and jobless, not needing to work because of Petra's endowment. When Marie leaves, Michelle stays on in the house on Brookside Close and invites Terry to move into together. Michelle later takes up dance classes and begins to develop romantic feelings for her dance instructor, Richard de Saville (Robert Dallas). Terry becomes suspicious of Michelle who begins attending Richard's classes more frequently. In May 1985 episodes, Terry accuses Michelle and Richard of having an affair. He then begins to lie to Michelle about a new job he secures working for Tommy at a night club. Michelle and Richard have sex and Terry finds them together. Richard upsets Michelle by revealing he is not interested in a relationship with her. Michelle later attempts to seduce Terry who reacts violently, throwing Michelle onto the bed and stripping the mattress. Terry is then shown throwing a mattress out of their bedroom window and slashing it with a knife. Michelle begs Terry to forgive him but he refuses. Jay recalled that Michelle felt sorry for Terry about the way he discovered her affair. She defended Michelle, noting she was a young woman and Richard was a glamorous character. She added that the scene in which Terry reacted violently towards Michelle in the bedroom was deemed socially acceptable when it was broadcast but it would not have been as acceptable in later years. Jay was also not present for the scenes of props being thrown out of the window, despite Michelle being in the scene. She recalled it was strange watching the final cut of the episode.

On 21 May 1985, it was announced in the British press that Jay had been "axed" from the show. The announcement came shortly after producers announced their intention to write out fellow regular character, Edna Cross (Betty Alberge). Jay told a Liverpool Echo reporter that "Brookside gave me my first big chance and it's going to be a wrench leaving." Michelle's on-screen family George and Marie and had already left on-screen after both Howells and Keaveney had quit their roles. The decision to write Michelle out of the series was linked to the departures of her direct family. A Brookside publicist added "now that her sister, Marie, has moved away from Liverpool, Michelle has become victim to the storyline." It was originally reported that Jay was intended to leave in September when her contract ran out but she left earlier in the British summer. Jay revealed that Michelle's exit would not be "very spectacular" and the character would not be killed off leaving the role open to a potential return. She added that she was looking forward to smiling again after playing such a depressing character. In her final scenes, Michelle accepts her relationship with Terry is ruined and decides to move to Leeds with Marie. Jay made her final appearance as Michelle during the episode broadcast on 18 June 1985.

Following her departure, Jay posted an acknowledgement in British newspaper The Stage which thanked Brookside's production team for "a happy and rewarding engagement as Michelle Jones". Jay told Joe Riley from Liverpool Echo that she did not want to be continually recognised just as Michelle and wanted to pursue other television work. Jay later revealed that she struggled with the attention she received from Brookside fans. She told Philip Key from Liverpool Daily Post that "you couldn't go shopping or anything. Lots of people came up to me. Some were very nice, but others were quite abusive and I had to ask them to leave me alone." In the book, "Phil Redmond's Brookside - Life in the Close" it details the lives of former Brookside characters away from the main series. In Michelle's story it is revealed that in 1991 she marries a mechanic, Dave Randall. He dies in a workplace accident and Michelle returns to Leeds to live with Marie and George.

== Reception ==
Ron Boyle from Daily Express included Michelle as one of "the kids who've put the bounce into Brookside" and branded her a "moody teenager". Summarising Michelle's Brookside story, Eleanor Levy from Record Mirror wrote that "she ran a Freemans' catalogue club, went on a beauty course and returned with a drastic new haircut. This impressed her boyfriend Terry so much they promptly moved in together." Johnny Dee from the publication included Michelle and Richard's affair being exposed and Terry's reaction in a Brookside's most "memorable moments" feature. Charles Fraser from Kent Evening Post reported that Brookside was gaining a reputation for being the sexiest soap opera and singled out four cast members. He noted that Jay's popularity with viewers saw her being voted "one of the most fanciable people in the world".

Michelle and Richard's affair was included in the Sunderland Echo critic's choice feature. They noted Michelle had to decide between "her loyal and long-suffering live-in boyfriend Terry" and "the smoothly leotard-clad Richard." Profiling Michelle and Terry's dynamic, John Holt from Nottingham Evening Post opined Michelle had to decide between "reliable old Terry or flashy Richard." He added that "fraught young relationships seems to be the order of the day in British soap operas at the moment." A critic from Chester Observer branded Michelle and Terry as having a "stormy relationship" complete with "odd man in" Richard. Liverpool Echo's Roy West opined that Jay "had to spend her life drooping around Brookside as miserable old Michelle" for two years. He added that the love triangle between her, Terry and Richard "does not seem to cheer her up much."
