= Petra Taylor =

Fictional character from the Channel 4 soap opera Brookside

- Brookside character
- Portrayed by: Alexandra Pigg
- Duration: 1982–1983
- First appearance: 23 November 1982
- Last appearance: 3 August 1983
- Created by: Phil Redmond
In-universe information
- Occupation: Secretary
- Father: Davey Jones
- Sisters: Marie Jackson; Michelle Jones
- Husband: Gavin Taylor (1982–1983)
- Nephews: Little George Jackson; Gary Jackson
- First cousins: Ronnie

Petra Taylor is a fictional character from the British Channel 4 soap opera Brookside, played by Alexandra Pigg. One of the show's original characters, Petra debuted on-screen during the episode broadcast on 23 November 1982. Brookside is set in Liverpool and Pigg is a Liverpudlian from Knotty Ash. Her casting was announced on 5 October 1982 and she spoke optimistically about joining the show. Petra is characterised as a moody typist working at an insurance office. Petra is introduced into the series alongside her husband Gavin Taylor (Daniel Webb). The Taylors' problematic marriage causes Petra's moodiness and writers scripted her transformation into a tragic character.

Petra desperately wants a child of her own but Gavin's low sperm count prevents this. Webb left the show and Gavin was killed off. This sent Petra into a prolonged period of grief, only unburdened by discovering she is pregnant. Writers introduced Petra's family into the show which included her sisters, Marie Jackson (Anna Keaveney) and Michelle Jones (Tracy Jay). Her subsequent miscarriage and doomed relationship with Barry Grant (Paul Usher) allowed writers fully realise Petra's depression and her story culminates in a suicide storyline. Pigg was happy Petra had been killed-off because she was unhappy in the role. She believed her happy personality clashed with Petra's misery and depression. She disliked having to play constant tragedy after Gavin's death and grew annoyed at the public reaction to Petra's disappearance story.

== Casting ==
On 5 October 1982, Pigg's casting was announced alongside other numerous original cast members ahead of the series debut. Pigg was aged twenty when she joined the cast and came from the Knotty Ash area of Liverpool. Promotional on-set photographs were also released showing Pigg with Daniel Webb, who plays Petra's husband Gavin Taylor. Mark Thomas from the Liverpool Echo reported than Petra would be introduced into Brookside a few weeks after its premiere episode. Pigg was optimistic about being cast in a new show and told Thomas that "I think people will watch it right away in Liverpool, because it is set here, down south it might take a bit longer." Pigg's first appearance as Petra was broadcast on 23 November 1982.

== Development ==
=== Introduction ===
In her backstory, Petra's mother died when she was a child and their father Davey Jones (Ian Hendry) was a drunk who was unable to care for them. This forced Petra's sister, Marie Jackson (Anna Keaveney) to look after Petra and their younger sister, Michelle Jones (Tracy Jay). Pigg told Geoff Baker from Birmingham Mail that "Petra's just an ordinary typist who desperately wants a baby." Writers made Petra aged twenty-four, unlike Pigg who was four years younger. In a character profile published in TVTimes, Petra was described as being the "attractive wife" of Gavin, who has to suffer his "roving eye" when shows interest in other women. It added that Petra and Gavin have marriage problems. In the book, Brookside: The Official Companion, show creator Phil Redmond profiled Petra as a "typist at a large insurance office who always seemed to be on the verge of a good long sulk." Her characterisation is mostly formed around her problematic relationship with Gavin and their struggle to have their own child. Redmond described Petra as finding "solace" in her home décor, which was filled with Waring & Gillow furniture. He also called her a "tragic" character.

Petra moves into number ten Brookside Close with her husband Gavin. The house would later gain infamy for being the centre of various tragic stories and down-on-their-luck characters residing there. Petra and Gavin's tragic stories set the tone for future occupants of the household. Redmond wrote that it was "almost as though the house had been built on restless graves."

Prior to their arrival, Petra and Gavin's front garden was strewn with old kitchen cookers. Upon their arrival, they moved their belongings into Brookside Close on a meat truck. The couple also memorably owned a silver BMW car with the slogan "Gav + Pet" stuck to its front windscreen. Following their introduction, writers created a feud between the Taylor's and their neighbour Roger Huntington (Rob Spendlove). They also portrayed a difficult marriage between Petra and Gavin owed to Petra's desperation to have a child of their own. The issue causes their sexual relationship to deteriorate. Petra also does not approve of Gavin's business selling pre-owned cookers. Petra keeps trying to become pregnant but they are unsuccessful. They later discover that Gavin has a low sperm count which has been preventing pregnancy.

Ken Irwin from Daily Mirror reported that Brookside producers offered Webb an eight-month extension to his initial three-month contract. Webb refused the offer and production implemented a death storyline they had created for Gavin. Irwin confirmed that Pigg would remain in the show and Gavin's death "brings the warring neighbours of Brookside estate a little closer." Show creator Phil Redmond later confirmed that Gavin's death became a plot device to bond the remaining characters. The scenes feature Petra discovering Gavin dead in bed after having a brain haemorrhage. Pigg told West that she had a cold during the filming of Gavin's death scenes, which aided her portrayal. She stated "I think that helped a lot with all that sniffing I had to do in the big death scene." Pigg did not believe Gavin's death would ruin Petra's development and revealed "I don't know what the scriptwriters have in store, but Petra Taylor isn't the spinster type." After Gavin's death, Petra briefly stays with her sister Marie.

=== Relationship with Barry Grant ===
Producers arranged location filming in Isle of Man for a holiday storyline featuring Petra and her new love interest Barry Grant (Paul Usher). Also joining them were fellow characters Alan Partridge (Dicken Ashworth) and Samantha Davis (Dinah May). The production normally filmed up to six weeks in advance of episodes being broadcast. For this story, only a week was given to travel to the island, film and edit the episodes in time for transmission. Paparazzi photographs of the cast travelling to Isle of Man were released on 1 June 1983. One of the aims were to film during the practise run of the annual motorcycle racing event, the Isle of Man TT. The episodes would then be broadcast and appear in real time as the actual racing event. The scenes were successfully filmed, edited and broadcast from 7–8 June 1983. A journalist from South Wales Echo reported that the "happy trip" would "end in sadness". This was confirmed when Petra has a miscarriage on the boat journey back to Liverpool. Barry does not visit Petra in hospital causing a feud between Barry and Marie. Despite her sister's disapproval, she continues her romance with Barry.

Writers continued to portray Petra as a tragic character and marred her relationship with Barry. They introduced an issue lead story for Petra when she develops depression. Her condition and grief over Gavin is a constant problem between her and Barry. Barry cannot cope with Petra's behaviour and flees to London, leaving Petra alone to battle with her depression. Petra then flees a pub following male attention and has a breakdown at a supermarket. Michelle attempts to help Petra but she later packs her belongings and runs away. Petra's car is found abandoned by police and she is reported missing. Karen Grant (Shelagh O'Hara) believes she has seen Petra in St Helens, which diverts the search there but she was mistaken. She remains missing for four months until Marie receives a postcard from Petra at Christmas. They then discover she has cashed in a cheque while in Southport.

=== Departure ===
Marie becomes optimistic Petra will soon return home but writers had already created a tragic ending for Petra via a suicide story. Pigg had remained contracted to Brookside for just one year. The episode dealing with Petra's suicide was broadcast on 25 January 1984, when police inform Marie and Michelle. Petra's death occurred off-screen at a North Wales boarding house. Viewers who missed the episode continued writing to the Brookside press office, enquiring what had happened to Petra. This continued for more than eight months. Pigg told Liverpool Echo's Roy West that she did not watch Petra's suicide episode. She was also annoyed by members of the public unable to separate reality and fiction. She revealed that "by then I was getting pretty tired of it all because people were always spotting me and thinking they had done something really clever - after all in the storyline Petra was supposed to be missing." Pigg added that on one "embarrassing" occasion, a "big gang of lads" noticed her and chased her down a Liverpudlian street.

Pigg disliked Petra's moody characterisation and tragic stories following Gavin's death. She wanted Petra to transform into a "merry widow". Pigg described herself as "naturally outgoing and happy" and Petra being "miserable and depressed" constantly did not "suit her". She also revealed that playing Petra created a "nervous tension" that caused her to giggle in scenes, which she worried about. Owed to this negative experience, Pigg told West that she was relieved that writers killed Petra off. In 1987, she told Peter Grant from Liverpool Echo that "after playing the depressing Petra in Brookside it was a relief believe me, to be away from the soap character - even though I am proud of my involvement in Brookside." Pigg also believed the show quickly lost its authentic Liverpool accents after her and Usher's departures.

== Reception ==
James Moore and Clare Goldwin from the Daily Mirror described Petra's best storyline as her "committing suicide after her husband's death". Their colleague Ken Irwin branded Petra "the sex siren of Brookside" and labelled her and Gavin a "sexy" couple. Max Bell (also from Daily Mirror) opined that Pigg was "a big hit in Brookside" and branded Petra as "neurotic and ill-starred". David Stuckey and Len Capeling from Daily Post labelled Petra as "an attractive bird on the boil, with added sex problems." Michael Owen of the Evening Standard branded Petra a "moody" character and the Daily Record's Avril Martin believed Pigg "won attention as Petra, the neurotic housewife." In the book, "The Guinness Book of Classic British TV", it was noted that Brookside portrayed storylines that other shows would have "unconvincingly introduced, dealt with and finished within weeks." He noted that storylines such as the "slow descent to suicide taken by Petra" was a prime example of the show's commitment to long term stories.

On the Taylor's marriage, Birmingham Mail's Geoff Baker opined that "Gavin's love life should titillate viewers. Married to Petra - whose tight dresses reveal the lines of her underwear - Gavin lusts after neighbour, Heather Huntington." Another Birmingham Mail critic assessed that Petra and Gavin's debut set the tone for "trouble" and "sparks" in Brookside. They reviewed that the Taylor's make such a negative impression "life in our Liverpudlian cul-de-sac may never recover." They also branded Petra the "voluptuous wife" with "obvious charms". A writer from the Burton Mail was confused by Gavin's behaviour lusting after Heather because Petra is "attractive" but it was clear their marriage had problems. They added that Petra and Gavin's introduction "added a new dimension" to "Brookside life". Frank Jeffery from The Sunday People branded Petra the "merry widow" and believed killing her off was a "pity" because Brookside needed her "dose of earthy sexuality". Bronwen Balmforth from Titbits believed that Petra and Gavin originated the reputation of number 10 Brookside Close being the soap's unlucky house. She branded Petra and Gavin a "tragic couple" because they were the first characters to die in the show.
