= Alan Partridge (Brookside) =

Fictional character from Brookside

- Brookside character
- Portrayed by: Dicken Ashworth
- Duration: 1983–1984
- First appearance: 22 March 1983
- Last appearance: 18 July 1984
- Created by: Phil Redmond
In-universe information
- Other names: Cyril Alan Partridge
- Father: Cyril Partridge
- Mother: Molly Partridge
- Wife: Samantha Davis (1984–present)
- Uncles: Arthur; Peter
- Aunts: Kate
- First cousins: Sylvia

Cyril Alan Partridge is a fictional character from the British Channel 4 soap opera Brookside, played by Dicken Ashworth. Alan appeared in the series until 18 July 1984. Ashworth was happy with his casting because he had previously been typecast in villainous roles. Alan is characterised as a "friendly type" and Ashworth relished the opportunity to play him. Writers portrayed him vastly different to other characters in the show. Alan is "scatter-brained" and an eccentric who enjoys computers, rugby and keeps a boat on his driveway. Other characters in the series view Alan as odd and find it difficult to understand his personality. Writers gave Alan enthusiastic dialogue in scenes which made him appear different to everyone else in his stories.

His main storyline developed by writers was his relationship with Samantha Davis (Dinah May). Alan's wedding storyline with Samantha ends with her jilting him at the registry office. Alan then dates Liz (Stacey Charlesworth), who creates trouble for Alan when he is accused of plagiarism over a computer programme he promotes. Ashworth left the series in 1984 and producers reintroduced Samantha for his departure storyline. Alan and Samantha marry and they move to Kuwait, where Alan takes a lucrative job role.

== Casting ==
Ashworth was happy to receive the role of Alan because he had struggled to gain a variety of roles due to his body type. Ashworth, a self-described "hard-looking Northern bloke" was used to being cast in villainous roles. He told Roy West from Liverpool Echo that Alan is a "friendly type" and that being cast in such a role was equally authentic because people of his size are also "shy and gentle types". Ashworth's original contract with Brookside ran until March 1984. He was not worried about playing an ongoing regular role because "the writers like him." Ashworth made his first appearance as Alan during the episode broadcast on 22 March 1983. Ashworth remained in the show until 1984.

== Development ==
=== Characterisation and introduction ===
Alan is characterised as a friendly character and describing his him, Ashworth told West that "he's the sort of bloke who'll get an idea and say, O.K. let's go and do it." Alan is portrayed as a "computer genius". In the book, Brookside: The Official Companion, show creator Phil Redmond profiled Alan as a "scatter-brained freelance computer programmer". Writers portrayed him out of conjunction with the remainder of characters featured in Brookside. They made this aware via other character's reactions to Alan. His neighbours wondered if "he had anything up top" because of his odd behaviour and thought he was "crackers" and "from another planet". Alan's dialogue featured over enthusiastic exclamations such as "ace" and "wonderous". Writers included a love of rugby in his hobbies and keeping a small boat on his drive. Redmond also described Alan as a "magnetic character who could always be relied upon to help pass a dull teenage hour." He added that Alan is a "chunky woolly-back" who has "almost boundless optimism." Alan moves onto Brookside Close after living with his mother his entire life. Geoff Tibballs, author of Phil Redmond's Brookside - Life in the Close described Alan as "burly" and a "born enthusiast". He detailed that Alan was able to talk about computers at great length and that it was his "ice breaker". He noted when Alan revamped his garden, it was "typically eccentric".

In Alan's debut episode, he arrives on Brookside Close to view the bungalow he has purchased. He also encounters Damon Grant (Simon O'Brien) and his friends who have broken into the property. When Alan moves into Brookside Close in April, writers introduced Alan's love interest Samantha Davis (Dinah May) in the following episodes. In episode 129, Alan's full name is revealed to be Cyril Alan Partridge.

=== Relationship with Samantha Davis ===
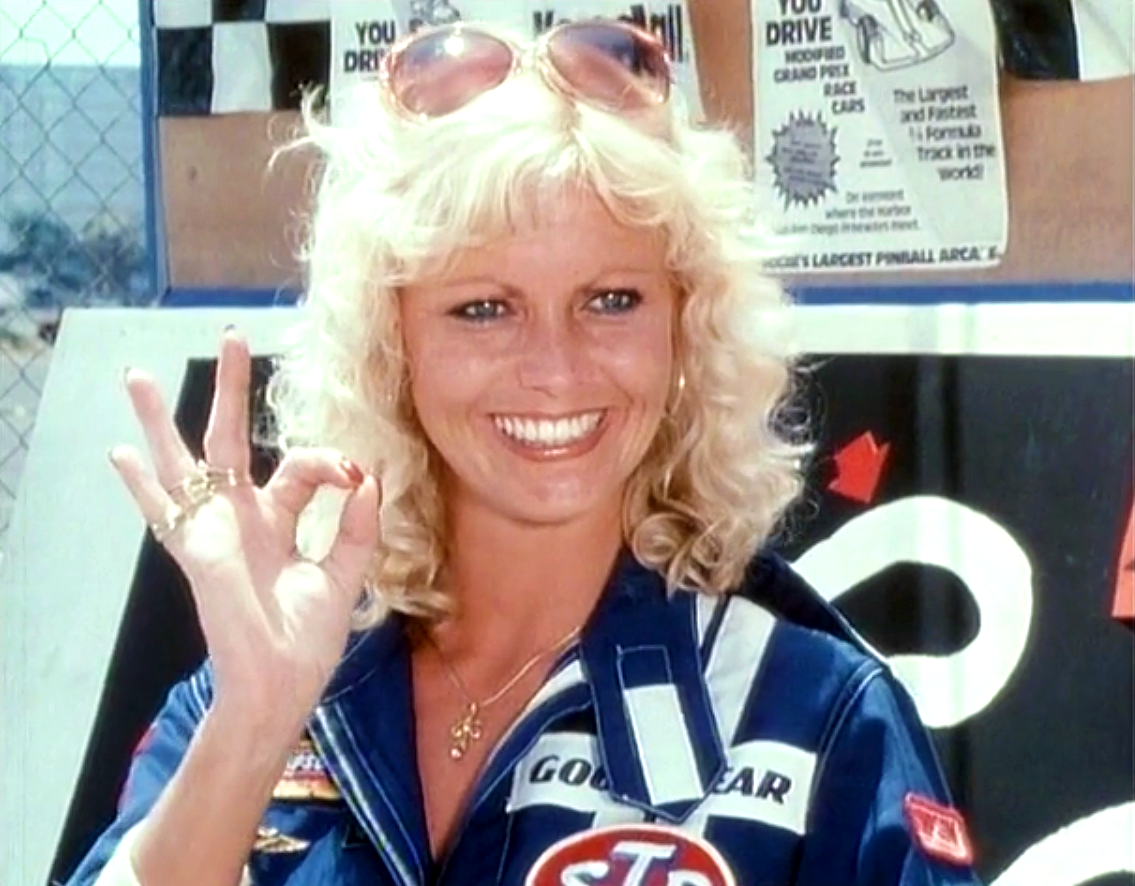
Dinah May plays Alan's main love interest and wife, Samantha Davis.

Writers soon created relationship dramas with Samantha refusing to marry Alan but later agreeing to move in with him. Despite the relationship, Ashworth believed it did not limit the potential for writers to expand Alan's character, telling West that "although he has a live-in girlfriend called Sam - he's not married and that means he can go in any direction." Unlike established couples featured in the show, Alan and Samantha are unmarried. May told West that "we're there to spark the series off because were not married." Early stories for the character portrayed Alan having to control situations where Damon and Jonah (Tom Branch) take a romantic interest in Samantha. In their backstory, Alan and Samantha met at a computer fair. Samantha is a computer systems demonstrator who grew bored with the usual men in the business. She likes Alan because he is different but Samantha was the type to flit in and out of Alan's life. He spent most of his time trying to keep her around and build their life together.

Producers arranged location filming in Isle of Man for a holiday storyline featuring Alan, Samantha and fellow characters Petra Taylor (Alexandra Pigg) and Barry Grant (Paul Usher). The production team usually filmed up to six weeks prior to episodes being broadcast. For this story, only a week was given to travel to the island, film and edit the episodes in time for transmission. Paparazzi photographs featuring Ashworth and May travelling to Isle of Man were released on 1 June 1983. One of the aims were to film during the practise run of the annual motorcycle racing event, the Isle of Man TT. The episodes would then be broadcast and appear in real time as the actual racing event. The scenes were successfully filmed, edited and broadcast from 7–8 June 1983. The storyline also tied into Alan's characterisation as a "motorbike fanatic".

Another issue writers explored with Alan and Samantha was marriage. He wants to marry Samantha and continues to pester her. She ends up challenging him to a competition to see who can earn the most money. Samantha states that should he earn more, then she will marry him. Samantha later shocks Alan by asking him to marry her. Writers planned a surprise conclusion for Alan and Samantha's wedding storyline with her jilting Alan at the service. Samantha asks Alan to marry writers made the actual ceremony a disaster. First Alan's best man lets him down and he is forced to ask Paul Collins (Jim Wiggins) and Samantha is late for service. Then at the registry office Samantha begins to have doubts and leaves her own wedding. She later tells Alan she can no longer marry him. She then absconds to Los Angeles as May was written out of the show. Following her departure, writers portrayed Alan's struggle to move on. He begins to drink heavily and a concerned Edna Cross (Betty Alberge) begins to offer his advice about moving on. In another storyline writers paired Alan with a new girlfriend Liz (Stacey Charlesworth) after Sam's departure for the US. He then helps Gordon Collins (Nigel Crowley) sell a computer game and discovers that Liz's actions have led to him being accused of plagiarism. Alan reacts badly, gets drunk and angrily goes around Brookside Close shouting abuse at his neighbours. When Alan ends their relationship she arranges for him to be violently attacked.

Months after jilting Alan at the registry office, Samantha was reintroduced into Alan's story following her hiatus. Alan's popularity had surged given that viewers berated May for Samantha's actions. May told Tony Pratt from the Daily Mirror that viewers approached her in public questioning Samantha's behaviour, adding that they believed her character was "quite awful".

=== Departure ===
In July 1984, Roy West from the Liverpool Echo reported that Ashworth would be leaving Brookside. West later revealed that Samantha was also being written out of the series. On 8 July, Felicity Hawkins from The Sunday People released advance story spoilers and a picture of Alan and Samantha getting married. Hawkins revealed that Alan and Samantha would successfully marry on their second attempt before leaving the show. The storyline plays out with Alan later reuniting with Samantha at a garden festival. They marry before moving out of Brookside Close to live in Kuwait, where Alan has been offered a lucrative job.

== Reception ==
Katy Brent from Closer said that Alan was a reason to still miss Brookside after it was cancelled. Alluding to the comedic character of the same name, played by Steve Coogan, she added that "Yes, there really was a Brookside character called Alan Partridge. He was the first resident of the bungalow and (as far as we know) had nothing to do with Radio Norwich." An Inside Soap reporter included Alan in a feature profiling soap opera characters with odd names. They noted that Coogan's Partridge created a dilemma. They noted that once the name is heard, you are left wondering "is this a computer programmer from Liverpool, or bonkers DJ for Radio Norwich? A-ha!" The Liverpool Echo's Roy West assessed that he could hardly blame Alan for leaving Liverpool after what "awful Samantha" did to him. Jane Moore from Sandwell Evening Mail alluded that Ashworth's portrayal of Alan was subpar because his performances in later roles was "much better". Roy West from Liverpool Echo branded Alan "probably the most offbeat character in the whole cast". He believed Alan "livens up" Brookside with his "slightly eccentric ways". Mike Critchley from Birmingham Metro News branded Alan a "gruff voiced rugby player". A Burton Mail critic branded the character a "cooky computer crank". Johnny Dee from Record Mirror stated that a "memorable moment" for the character was when Damon, Ducksie Brown (Mark Birch) and Gizzmo Hawkins (Robert Cullen) were "taking the piss" out of Alan. He also branded Alan a "chubby computer genius". In the book, "The Guinness Book of Classic British TV", the character is nicknamed "Alan 'Ace' Partridge" due to his commonly used "Ace" catchphrase.
