= Alan Partridge (disambiguation) =

Alan Partridge is a fictional character portrayed by Steve Coogan.

Alan Partridge may also refer to:

- Alan Partridge (Brookside), a soap opera character
- Alan Partridge: Alpha Papa, a 2013 comedy film
- Alan Partridge: Welcome to the Places of My Life, a 2012 television serial

== See also ==
- Mid Morning Matters with Alan Partridge, a British television and web series
