= A Chorus of Disapproval (film) =

- US Theatrical release poster
- Directed by: Michael Winner
- Written by: Alan Ayckbourn; Michael Winner
- Produced by: Michael Winner
- Starring: Jeremy Irons; Anthony Hopkins; Richard Briers; Barbara Ferris; Gareth Hunt; Lionel Jeffries; Patsy Kensit; Alexandra Pigg; Prunella Scales; Jenny Seagrove; Sylvia Syms
- Cinematography: Alan Jones
- Edited by: Chris Barnes; Michael Winner
- Music by: John Du Prez
- Distributed by: Curzon Films
- Release date: 18 August 1989
- Running time: 105 minutes
- Country: United Kingdom
- Language: English
- Budget: $4 million
- Box office: $216,373 (US) £177,685 (UK)

A Chorus of Disapproval is a 1989 British film adapted from the 1984 Alan Ayckbourn play of the same title, directed by Michael Winner. Among the films's cast are Anthony Hopkins, Jeremy Irons, Richard Briers, and Alexandra Pigg.

== Plot ==
The story follows a young widower, Guy Jones, as he joins an amateur operatic society that is putting on The Beggar's Opera. He rapidly progresses through the ranks to become the male lead, while simultaneously conducting liaisons with several of the female cast.

== Cast ==
- Jeremy Irons as Guy Jones
- Anthony Hopkins as Dafydd Ap Llewellyn
- Prunella Scales as Hannah Ap Llewellyn
- Jenny Seagrove as Fay Hubbard
- Sylvia Syms as Rebecca Huntley-Pike
- Gareth Hunt as Ian Hubbard
- Patsy Kensit as Linda Washbrook
- Lionel Jeffries as Jarvis Huntley-Pike
- Alexandra Pigg as Bridget Baines
- Richard Briers as Ted Washbrook
- Barbara Ferris as Enid Washbrook
- Pete Lee-Wilson as Crispin Usher
- David King as Mr. Ames
- Amanda Mainard as Woman in Theatre
- Dinah May as Girl at Work
- Anne Priestley as Hilda Shaw
- Audrey Trotter as Mrs. Bawden

== Filming Locations ==
The main filming locations in Scarborough were:

- Scarborough railway station - Guy arrives in Scarborough at the beginning and leaves for Blackpool at the end
- Duke of York Guest House, 1-2 Merchants Row, off Eastborough, Scarborough - Guy's lodgings
- Castle Community Centre, East Sandgate - the cast rehearse The Beggar's Opera
- Royal Opera House [demolished 2004, now Opera House Casino], St Thomas Street - the cast rehearse and then perform The Beggar's Opera in the theatre

== Reception ==
Time Out gave A Chorus of Disapproval a negative review, stating that most of the film's cast "can't cope with either the heavily truncated script or Winner's cloddish, half-baked direction."
