= Michelle Jones =

Michelle Jones or Michele Jones may refer to:

- Michele S. Jones (born 1962), United States Army Reserve officer
- Michele Jones (1974–1993), underage wife of cult leader David Koresh
- Michelle Jones (fl. 2012–2013), actress in the telenova Corazón valiente
- Michelle Jones (Brookside), soap opera character
- MJ (Marvel Cinematic Universe), full name Michelle Jones-Watson
