= George Christopher (actor) =

English actor (born 1970)

George Christopher (born George Wilson, 5 March 1970) is a British actor and author.

Christopher is best known for his teenage role as Liverpudlian Ziggy Greaves in the drama series Grange Hill, a role he played from 1986 to 1989. The character was popular with viewers, and Wilson himself compared his alter-ego with the series' original hero, Tucker Jenkins.

After Grange Hill, Christopher took on another high-profile role in the Channel 4 soap Brookside, as Little Jimmy Corkhill.

Christopher has also appeared in other productions including a play about the Hillsborough disaster.

In 1999, Christopher was diagnosed with bipolar disorder, as referenced in his autobiography, From Grange Hill to Bipolar and Back, originally published on 2 December 2019.

== Filmography ==
=== Audio ===
Year	Title	Role	Notes
2025	The Temple of the Killer Tiger Monkeys	Steve	Podcast series
