= Little Jimmy Corkhill =

Fictional character from Brookside

- Brookside character
- Portrayed by: George Christopher
- Duration: 1991–1992, 1996
- First appearance: 11 November 1991
- Last appearance: 29 November 1996
- Created by: Phil Redmond
In-universe information
- Father: Jimmy Corkhill
- Mother: Jackie Corkhill
- Brothers: William Corkhill
- Sisters: Lindsey Corkhill
- Grandfathers: Albie Corkhill; William Walker
- Grandmothers: Margaret Corkhill
- Uncles: Billy Corkhill; Frankie Corkhill
- Aunts: Val Walker
- Nieces: Kylie Corkhill
- First cousins: Rod Corkhill; Tracy Corkhill

James "Little Jimmy" Corkhill Jr. is a fictional character in the Channel 4 soap opera Brookside. He was portrayed by George Christopher and first appeared between 1991 and 1992. Little Jimmy resented his father, Jimmy (Dean Sullivan) for a number of years having caught him having sex with his aunt, Val Walker.

In 1996, Little Jimmy returned to Brookside Close after spending time in a French prison for drug-related offences. On his release, he returned home, with Jimmy in a transit van on a ferry from France. Jimmy and Jackie were then determined to wean him off his addiction. This did not happen, and at a real low point for the Corkhills, Jimmy senior bowed to his son's wishes, who was going through cold turkey, and supplied him with a heroin fix. However, the catalyst for little Jimmy's fate was when mother, Jackie (Sue Jenkins), discovered he had smuggled a large amount of heroin back into Britain, strapping it to his abdomen. In a fit of rage she then managed to get hold of it and flushed it down the toilet of the family home. A few months later, two gangster figures, led by a man called Rufus, came looking for Little Jimmy, presumably to collect money for the heroin that they had given Little Jimmy. They met Ron Dixon at the Parade, who mistook them for plain-clothes detectives and gave them the Corkhills' address. He did this to get back at Jimmy senior, who he had a long feud with. Little Jimmy's body was later found by his father after being murdered by the drug dealers who were looking for him.

In November 1996, during a scene in which Little Jimmy breaks into the Dixons' house, the character was portrayed by another actor, Paul Sanders. This was due to the scene needing to be re-shot, and after regular actor George Christopher had left the show. The scene was filmed from behind and below the shoulders, leaving viewers to guess the identity of the burglar.

The 1998 Brookside film, Friday the 13th, set on 13 November 1998 when Lindsey Corkhill (Claire Sweeney) was marrying Peter Phelan (Samuel Kane), involved a final showdown between Jimmy with his daughter Lindsey on one side with Little Jimmy's killer Rufus and Little Jimmy's old drug supplier Justin on the other side, before Lindsey's wedding.
