= Dicken Ashworth =

English actor (born 1946)

- Born: 18 July 1946 (age 80); Todmorden, Yorkshire, England
- Occupation: Actor
- Years active: 1977–2012

Dicken Ashworth (born 18 July 1946) is an English actor.

== Career ==
Ashworth's film credits include King of the Wind, Force 10 from Navarone, Tess, Krull and Wallace & Gromit: The Curse of the Were-Rabbit.

On television, Ashworth played Alan Partridge in Brookside from 1983 to 1984, Jeff Horton in Coronation Street from 1992 to 2000 and Duke Woods in Emmerdale from 2007 to 2008. Other television credits include Grange Hill, Juliet Bravo, Minder, Blake's 7, The Chinese Detective, Doctor Who, C.A.T.S. Eyes, The Bill, Boon, Inspector Morse, Dangerfield, Keeping Up Appearances, The Thin Blue Line, Heartbeat and Where the Heart Is.

Ashworth appears in the video to the Pretenders' 1986 single "Don't Get Me Wrong".

== Filmography ==
Year	Title	Role	Notes
1978	Force 10 from Navarone	Nolan	
1979	A Nightingale Sang in Berkeley Square	Charlie the Chubb	
1979	Tess	Farmer Groby	
1982	Remembrance	Frank	
1983	Krull	Bardolph	
1987	Out of Order	Pool Player	
1988	Vroom	Huff	
1990	King of the Wind	Woodcarter	
1992	B & B	Jeremy	
1998	The Revengers' Comedies	Lorry Driver	
2005	Wallace & Gromit: The Curse of the Were-Rabbit	Mr. Mulch	Voice
