= Dinah May =

British model

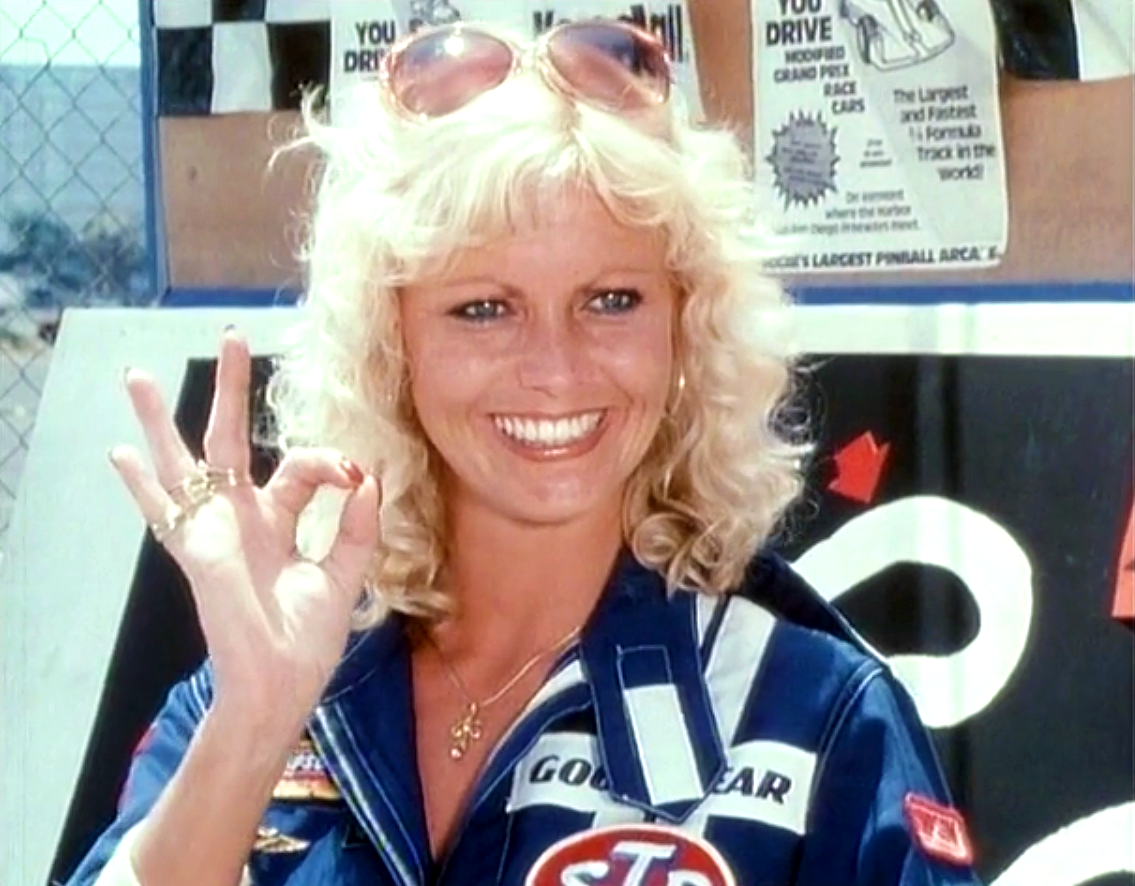
- May on The Optimist, 1983
- Born: 9 September 1954 (age 72); Irby, Cheshire, England
- Occupations: Model; actress; personal assistant

Dinah May (born 9 September 1954), is an English former model, former Miss Great Britain, and former actress, latterly the personal assistant to film director Michael Winner.

== Career ==
May was born in Irby, Cheshire, and trained as a hairdresser. However, she found that she earned more money as a part-time model, and so took that up full-time. In 1976 she won Miss Great Britain and appeared as one of the score girls in BBC TV's It's A Knockout for three years between 1976 and 1978.

After this, she moved into television and acting, taking supporting parts in Blake's 7, Harry's Game and The Optimist before gaining the part of Samantha Partridge in Brookside, in which on 17 July 1984 she appeared in the first "Brookside wedding".

== Michael Winner ==
In 1982 she met British film director Michael Winner in a restaurant, and became his PA in 1990. She undertook the role for the next 22 years, accompanying him in both his personal life and on his various film sets.

== Personal life ==
May was married, and has two adult sons, but divorced in 2009. She has an extensive collection of vintage and contemporary photographs including press photographs, still lifes, celebrity Polaroids, and nude studies.

== Filmography ==
- The Optimist (1983) - Lady racing driver
- Death Wish 3 (1985) - Nurse #1
- Claudia (1985) - Party Hostess
- A Chorus of Disapproval (1989) - Girl at Work
- Bullseye! (1990) - Girl in Bar (final film role)

| Preceded by Susan Cuff | Miss Great Britain; 1976 | Succeeded by Susan Hempel |
