= Brookside (TV series) =

British television soap opera (1982–2003)

- Genre: Soap opera
- Created by: Phil Redmond
- Starring: List of characters
- Theme music composer: Dave Roylance; Steve Wright
- Country of origin: United Kingdom
- Original language: English
- No. of episodes: 2,915

Production
- Executive producer: Phil Redmond
- Producers: Nicholas Prosser; Stuart Doughty; Vanessa Whitburn; Mal Young; Ric Mellis; Jon East; Tony Morris; Sue Sutton Mayo; David Andrews; Paul Marquess; David Hansen; Garth Tucker; Nicky Higgens
- Production locations: Liverpool, England
- Camera setup: Single-camera setup
- Running time: 30–100 minutes
- Production company: Mersey Television

Original release
- Network: Channel 4
- Release: 2 November 1982 – 4 November 2003

Related
- Damon and Debbie; South; Hollyoaks

Brookside is a British television soap opera, set in Liverpool, England, which began on 2 November 1982, and ran for 21 years until 4 November 2003. It was produced by Mersey Television and conceived by Grange Hill and Hollyoaks creator Phil Redmond.

Brookside was Channel 4's highest rated programme from the mid-1980s to the mid-1990s, with audiences regularly in excess of seven million. Initially notable for its realistic and socially challenging storylines, Brookside is remembered for broadcasting the first pre-watershed lesbian kiss on British television, and a domestic abuse storyline resulting in murder. From the mid-1990s the show began raising more controversial subjects under producers Mal Young and Paul Marquess, and experienced an extreme backlash from viewers in 1996 following a hugely controversial storyline focusing on an incestuous sexual relationship between two siblings; from thereon the show became synonymous with outrageous and improbable storylines that affected its popularity. Viewing figures were in terminal decline by 2000, and low ratings eventually led to its cancellation, with the final episode airing on 4 November 2003.

From February 2023, Brookside has been available to stream from the first episode on STV Player.

Brookside's location and former cast members were involved in a crossover episode with Hollyoaks on 22 October 2025, as part of the latter's 30th anniversary. Elements from the show were also included in the late night Hollyoaks Later special that also broadcast on 22 October 2025 with Brookside Close featuring at the beginning of the episode.

== Development ==
=== Conception and preparation ===
Phil Redmond has first conceived the idea for a drama serial centred on a newly-built housing estate in 1973, while writing for sitcom Doctor in Charge. He pitched the programme to several ITV production companies, but it was not picked up and Redmond abandoned it. In 1981 he attended a lecture given at the Royal Institution of Great Britain by Jeremy Isaacs, the chief executive of newly-commissioned Channel 4, who was looking for independent producers that could provide content for the channel, which led to Redmond promising Isaacs a format for a drama serial and revisiting his original concept. After previous clashes with the BBC during production of Grange Hill, Redmond established production company Mersey Television to maintain control over his future programmes; Brookside would be its first product.

In early 1982, Mersey Television purchased 13 houses on a cul-de-sac in Croxteth, Liverpool, on land formerly a part of Lord Sefton's estate. Six of the houses would be seen on-screen as sets, while the remaining seven were used for administration, post-production and canteen facilities. The cul-de-sac backed onto the River Alt, which lent the programme its name, replacing Redmond's original title Meadowcroft (which would later be recycled for the show's in-universe soap opera, Meadowcroft Park). The houses cost a total of £25,000 and were custom-built by Broseley Homes. Using houses on a real new-build estate added to the desired realism Redmond wanted.

Ahead of the first episode in November, Redmond gave an interview to Liverpool Echo in March 1982 describing the show as "a cross between Knots Landing [...] and Coronation Street", and stated his intention to have Brookside deal realistically with issues faced by its potential viewers. The article also included a overview of the characters, including mention of a black family called the Manchesters, who were later scrapped during the production process. Actors that were unfamiliar to the public were cast to enhance the credibility of the characters; the ensemble was smaller than other soaps, having only 16 regular characters and only three of the six houses occupied. This was an intentional choice made to reflect the reality of new-build estate occupancy, and it was over a year until all the houses were full. Shooting for the first episode began on 6 September 1982.

=== 1980s ===
Central to much of the show's early publicity were the working-class Grant family - socialist factory worker Bobby (Ricky Tomlinson), devout Catholic Sheila (Sue Johnston), and their children Barry (Paul Usher), Karen (Shelagh O'Hara) and Damon (Simon O'Brien) - who moved into 5 Brookside Close from a rundown council estate. Bobby and Sheila's turbulent marriage proved popular, as Bobby's socialist principles clashed with Sheila's traditional family values. The Grants contrasted their conservative, middle-class neighbours Paul (Jim Wiggins) and Annabelle Collins (Doreen Sloane), and their children Lucy (Katrin Cartlidge/Maggie Saunders) and Gordon (Nigel Crowley/Mark Burgess), who downsized from a large home on the Wirral to Number 8 after Paul was made redundant from his executive position at a chemical plant. Much of the early storylines were driven by the social and political differences between the left-wing Grants and the right-wing Collinses. Number 9 was occupied by solicitor's clerk Roger Huntington (Rob Spendlove) and his wife, ambitious accountant Heather (Amanda Burton), who together represented the emerging yuppie subculture. Roger, who was ashamed of his working-class roots, sided with the Collinses against the Grants; Belfast-born Heather was friendly with both families. Low-class newlyweds Gavin (Danny Webb) and Petra Taylor (Alexandra Pigg) arrived next-door to the Huntingtons at Number 10 at the end of November, and Gavin infuriated their neighbours by selling stolen gas cookers from his front lawn.

The first episode was watched by 4.2 million viewers, but initial reactions were far from positive. Critics were quick to point out various technical problems, as well as the swearing now being screened before the watershed. As viewing figures stabilised at 1 million, the production team started to iron out the show's teething troubles. Soundproof panels were placed on the ceilings of the houses to contain sound and eliminate echoing, and scriptwriters toned down the language and removed a couple of poorly performing supporting actors. The atmosphere changed as the rest of the original cast arrived in 1983: computer programmer Alan Partridge (a character played by Dicken Ashworth and unrelated to the later comedy character of the same name) moved into Number 6 in April, and pensioners Harry (Bill Dean) and Edna Cross (Betty Alberge) bought Number 7, arriving in November. Following the death of Gavin and the disappearance of Petra, Number 10 became home to Petra's sisters Michelle Jones (Tracey Jay) and Marie Jackson (Anna Keaveney), along with Marie's husband George (Cliff Howells) and their twin sons, Gary and Little George (Allan and Steven Patterson). These new characters expanded the cast whilst helping to bring humour and balance to the existing dynamic. By 1984, off the back of the popular "Free George Jackson" storyline, Brookside had achieved mainstream popularity, being voted best programme of the year by separate polls in Smash Hits and No.1 magazines.

Brookside topped 7 million for the first time in 1985 following a dramatic siege storyline that proved popular with viewers, despite criticism of the unlikeliness of the plot (Hilary Kingsley described it as "ludicrous") and the killing of the programme's only black character, Kate Moses (Sharon Rosita). September that year saw the arrival of the first generation of the Corkhill family, Billy (John McArdle), Doreen (Kate Fitzgerald), Rod (Jason Hope) and Tracy (Justine Kerrigan), accompanied by Doreen's malapropping mother Julia Brogan (Gladys Ambrose) and Billy's ne'er-do-well brother Jimmy (Dean Sullivan).

The late 1980s saw two spin-offs, referred to as "soap bubbles". The first, 1987's Damon and Debbie, focussed on the relationship between Damon Grant and schoolgirl Debbie McGrath (Gillian Kearney) as they fled their families in Liverpool to make their own life in York; the series ended in Damon's death, being stabbed while defending himself from a mugger. The second, 1988's South, featured Tracy Corkhill and Jamie Henderson (Sean McKee) heading to London to find employment, sick of the lack of opportunities in Merseyside. The spin-offs were both written by regular Brookside contributor Frank Cottrell-Boyce, and were woven into the narrative of Brookside as well, particularly Damon and Debbie, as scriptwriters explored the grief of Bobby and Sheila at their youngest son's death. The episode featuring Damon's funeral gained 7 million viewers, and also introduced the Rogers family. Lorry driver Frank (Peter Christian) and his wife Chrissy (Eithne Brown) had three children, Sammy (Rachael Lindsay), Geoff (Kevin Carson/Stephen Walters) and Katie (Debbie Reynolds/Diane Burke), and became the show's new nuclear family following the disintegration of the Grants. This status was solidified by the Rogers family buying the Grants' old house, Number 5, at auction in May 1989. Other storylines at this time included the slow-burning romance between divorcees Billy Corkhill and Sheila Grant, and the marriage of longtime resident Terry Sullivan (Brian Regan) and his pregnant girlfriend Sue Harper (Annie Miles).

=== 1990s ===
Many long-standing characters departed in 1990. Harry Cross moved to St Helens in May; the entire Collins family was written out by June, following the sudden death of actress Doreen Sloane; Billy and Sheila Corkhill, having married in August, departed for Basingstoke in September; and solicitor Jonathan Gordon-Davies (Steven Pinner), who had bought Number 9 in 1987, left for London in October. The departures made way for an influx of new characters who arrived in rapid succession. Harry Cross's lodger Mick Johnson (Louis Emerick) took full residence of Number 6, and was joined by his wife Josie (Suzanne Packer) and their children, Leo (Leeon Sawyer/Steven Cole) and Gemma (Naomi Kamanga) in May; quantity surveyor Max Farnham (Steven Pinder) and his wife, public relations consultant Patricia (Gabrielle Glaister), bought Number 7 in July, moving in with their infant son Thomas (Kieran Warham) and live-in nanny Margaret Clemence (Nicola Stephenson); and working-class Ron (Vince Earl) and DD Dixon (Irene Marot) moved into Number 8 in October, accompanied by their three children Mike (Paul Byatt), Jacqui (Alexandra Fletcher) and Tony (Gerard Bostock/Mark Lennock) and "The Moby", their mobile shop. The dynamic between the Dixons and the Farnhams echoed that of the Grant and Collins families at the show's inception, and there remained a strong rivalry between them until Brookside's demise. The Rogers family remained at Number 5, the Sullivans at Number 9 with son Danny (Kieran Poole), and siblings Rod and Tracy Corkhill continued living at Number 10 with new stepbrother Barry Grant. Barry, now without any of his biological family to ground him, descended further into Liverpool's criminal underworld.

Even with the near-wholesale cast change, ratings were regularly topping 7 million and a third weekly episode was added from 1 July 1990. To accommodate this, Mersey Television bought a defunct technical college in nearby Childwall, planning to incorporate it into the programme as a row of shops called Brookside Parade, most of which would be owned by residents of Brookside Close.

The first lesbian kiss on pre-watershed British television between Beth Jordache (left) and Margaret Clemence (right)

Brookside's most famous storyline, known as "The Body Under the Patio", involved the murder of wife-beater and child abuser Trevor Jordache (Bryan Murray) in May 1993, at the hands of his wife Mandy (Sandra Maitland) and daughter Beth (Anna Friel). His body was unceremoniously buried beneath the patio at Number 10 and remained there until its unearthing in January 1995 during a search for a leaking water pipe. The trial and imprisonment of Mandy and Beth Jordache captivated viewers and drew Brookside's highest ratings of 9 million viewers. The storyline was inspired by a 1990 murder in the West Midlands, when a woman killed her abusive husband and buried him in her garden. The Jordache family contributed heavily to the show's appeal, especially through Beth Jordache sharing the first televised pre-watershed lesbian kiss with Margaret Clemence, and Mandy's relationship with popular long-standing character Sinbad (Michael Starke). However, the conclusion to their storyline drew criticism when Beth suddenly died off-screen from an undiagnosed heart disease while incarcerated for Trevor's murder and waiting for an appeal hearing. The character's death came when Anna Friel decided not to renew her contract and quit the role; executive producer Redmond explained to disappointed viewers at the time that he felt it would not be right to leave the character languishing in prison. Mandy Jordache left shortly afterward, having been acquitted and given birth to hers and Sinbad's daughter, which left only youngest child Rachel (Tiffany Chapman), who remained until the programme's end.

Following the conclusion of the Jordache family's story, writers persisted with contentious and sensational storylines to keep ratings high and Brookside in the headlines. In 1996, an incest storyline between siblings Georgia (Helen Grace) and Nat Simpson (John Sandford) drew substantial backlash, especially as they were caught in bed by younger brother Danny (Andrew Butler). In the aftermath of viewer complaints to the Independent Television Commission, Channel 4 were ordered to broadcast a public apology and Redmond admitted that he and the writers "got it wrong"; senior producer Mal Young also drew criticism for taking the programme away from its social-realist roots. Following the separate departures of Rod and Tracy Corkhill, their uncle Jimmy (Dean Sullivan) was joined by his estranged wife Jackie (Sue Jenkins) and daughter Lindsey (Claire Sweeney). Sweeney became popular among Brookside's audience, and Lindsey went through several different incarnations, moving from a downtrodden single mother to a formidable gun-toting gangster romantically involved with Barry Grant. Lindsey became so associated with guns that the Mersey Television publicity department released promotional pictures of Sweeney posing provocatively with a firearm. The complete transformation of the character was indicative of the improbable storylines, and Lindsey's spell as a gangster was described by Lorna Hughes of the Liverpool Echo as "best forgotten".

By 1998, viewing figures had fallen below 7 million and new Channel 4 chief executive Michael Jackson was considering cancelling the show. In response to the falling ratings, and criticisms for outlandish and dangerous plots that upset television watchdogs, producers shifted focus back onto the families and their dynamics within a close-knit community; Redmond would go on to comment that the Brookside of 1998 was closer to the show he had launched in 1982. Despite the attempt to return to realism and issue-led plots, Brookside had become synonymous with guns and explosions, and was losing support among its viewers and the press. Alison Graham, TV listing editor for Radio Times, dropped the show from her soap opera column in 1998 and replaced it with BBC Radio 4's rural soap The Archers.

=== 2000s ===
2000 saw Brookside try and revamp itself for the new millennium, by reviving past characters Josie Johnson (Suzanne Packer), Bev McLoughlin (Sarah White), Leanne Powell (Vickie Gates) and Nisha Batra (Sunetra Sarker), and introducing pop singer Bernie Nolan in her first acting role as Diane Murray, the matriarch of a new nuclear family in Number 9. This succeeded in sparking a new interest in the programme, although many of the plots were felt to be rehashes of previously explored issues. The departure of the popular Sinbad in a controversial child abuse scandal, and a love triangle involving Lindsey Corkhill, Shelley Bowers (Alexandra Wescourt) and Lindsey's mother Jackie, were poorly received by viewers, and Redmond spoke out again: "NHS and childcare - these are the things that engage and worry people now. [...] I'm giving up the lesbian-affair-with-the-mother-in-law syndrome". One of the more successful plotlines was the death of Susannah Morrisey (Karen Drury) in a "Whodunit?" storyline that pushed viewing figures back over 6 million.

The ratings boost from Susannah's death did not last and by 2001, the programme was again in dire straits. Ratings dropped back below 5 million viewers, long-running characters Lindsey Corkhill, Mick Johnson, and Jackie Corkhill were written out, and producer Paul Marquess left to produce ITV's The Bill. Brookside had been renewed for four years in 1997, but by the time this contract ended in 2001 the show was far less important in Channel 4's programming. After a failed attempt to lure back Mal Young, Phil Redmond resumed total control shortly before Brookside's 20th anniversary, and marked the occasion by pledging to return the ailing programme to its former glory at a meeting attended by the cast and crew. The exteriors of the houses on Brookside Close received decoration, four members of the cast were axed, and several new directors and writers were hired. A new focal family, the Gordons, were introduced, and characters returned to discussing current political and environmental issues, but Redmond's grounded new-look approach did little to stop declining ratings. The Gordons were considered miscast and unlikeable, and were unfavourably compared to the original Grant family. As Brookside approached its twentieth anniversary in November 2002, ratings dropped below 1.8 million. In response, Channel 4 announced that the programme would be withdrawn from its prime-time evening slots on weeknights and instead be broadcast only in its Saturday omnibus slot. Channel 4 was contractually obligated to Brookside until November 2003, and the move was seen as damage limitation, hoping that the move would cease the dwindling audience share and let it die quietly. This announcement coincided with the programmes twentieth anniversary, which was unfortunate as the show celebrated the milestone with an updated theme tune, new opening credits and a post-production film effect to update visuals.

The twentieth anniversary storyline in November 2002, which also featured the return of Claire Sweeney as Lindsey Corkhill, involved four armed drug dealers ending up on Brookside Close after taking a wrong turn during a police chase. Finding themselves cornered, they raided the houses and took several residents hostage in their homes. The scenes featured graphic violence, profanity and cocaine consumption, and culminated with a police helicopter crashing and exploding onto the car park outside Brookside Parade. The storyline drew comparison to a similar 1993 storyline from Emmerdale, which had also been devised by Phil Redmond to save the flagging soap. Unlike Emmerdale, which was saved by its storyline, Brookside faced criticism for the unrealistic premise and unsuitability for pre-watershed viewing, especially as the omnibus had been broadcast at 4.30 pm on Saturday. A lack of promotion from Channel 4 meant that there was little change in the ratings.

The final year of Brookside began with a reduced budget and the programme's shift to one 90-minute episode on Saturdays. Episodes now only featured a small cast and in only one location, and the inclusion of gimmicks such as flashbacks, dream sequences and split screen were unsuccessful. Storylines followed the most popular characters in more self-contained episodes, while some were written out without on-screen departures. This included Max and Jacqui Farnham (Steven Pinder and Alexandra Fletcher), who were dismissed as having moved to Woolton with a scripted offhand comment made by Jacqui's father Ron Dixon (Vince Earl). With viewing figures now at around just 400,000, Brookside was officially cancelled by Channel 4 on 11 June 2003. The programme was then moved to a post-watershed timeslot, usually after 11 pm, and saw an increase of profanity and unfiltered violence. Producers began winding the show down, with the residents of Brookside Close selling up to a company that wanted to demolish the cul-de-sac to make space for an access road. The final episode was written by Phil Redmond and aired at 10:40 pm on 4 November 2003, two days after the programme's twenty-first anniversary. It ran for 100 minutes. The plot saw despised Jack Michaelson (Paul Duckworth) being lynched from his bedroom at Number 8 by a trio of unidentified neighbours, and ended with Jimmy Corkhill (Dean Sullivan) giving a scripted rant about modern society before vandalising the abandoned houses and moving to live in Newcastle-upon-Tyne, where his daughter Lindsey had become engaged to Barry Grant (Paul Usher). At its peak, the final episode drew in 2.27 million viewers.

=== After Brookside ===
Following Brookside's removal from primetime in November 2002, Mersey Television began to phase out Brookside Parade from the series; they instead began utilising the set for its other programmes Hollyoaks and Grange Hill. Number 7 and Number 8 were used on Hollyoaks as homes to the Dean and Burton-Taylor families; the interior of Number 8 was not seen again following its repurposing for Hollyoaks, and its Brookside resident Jack Michaelson (Paul Duckworth) only ever appeared at the front door. Although the two houses were dressed with mock-Tudor cladding for Brookside and avoided being used in long-shots, viewers frequently noticed props that made their use in Hollyoaks obvious.

After Mersey Television was sold to All3Media in June 2005, all thirteen of the Brookside houses were sold to a property developer who attempted to repurpose them for residential living. The houses were listed for sale in January 2007 with asking prices between £199,000 and £295,000, but they were offered in a semi-finished condition and did not sell. The developer went into receivership soon after, and the properties fell into neglect.

In 2008, a local production company was given special permission to use Brookside Close for a low-budget horror film called Salvage. The film received modest reviews but was not widely distributed. Despite the best efforts of the set designers, some reviewers recognised the location.

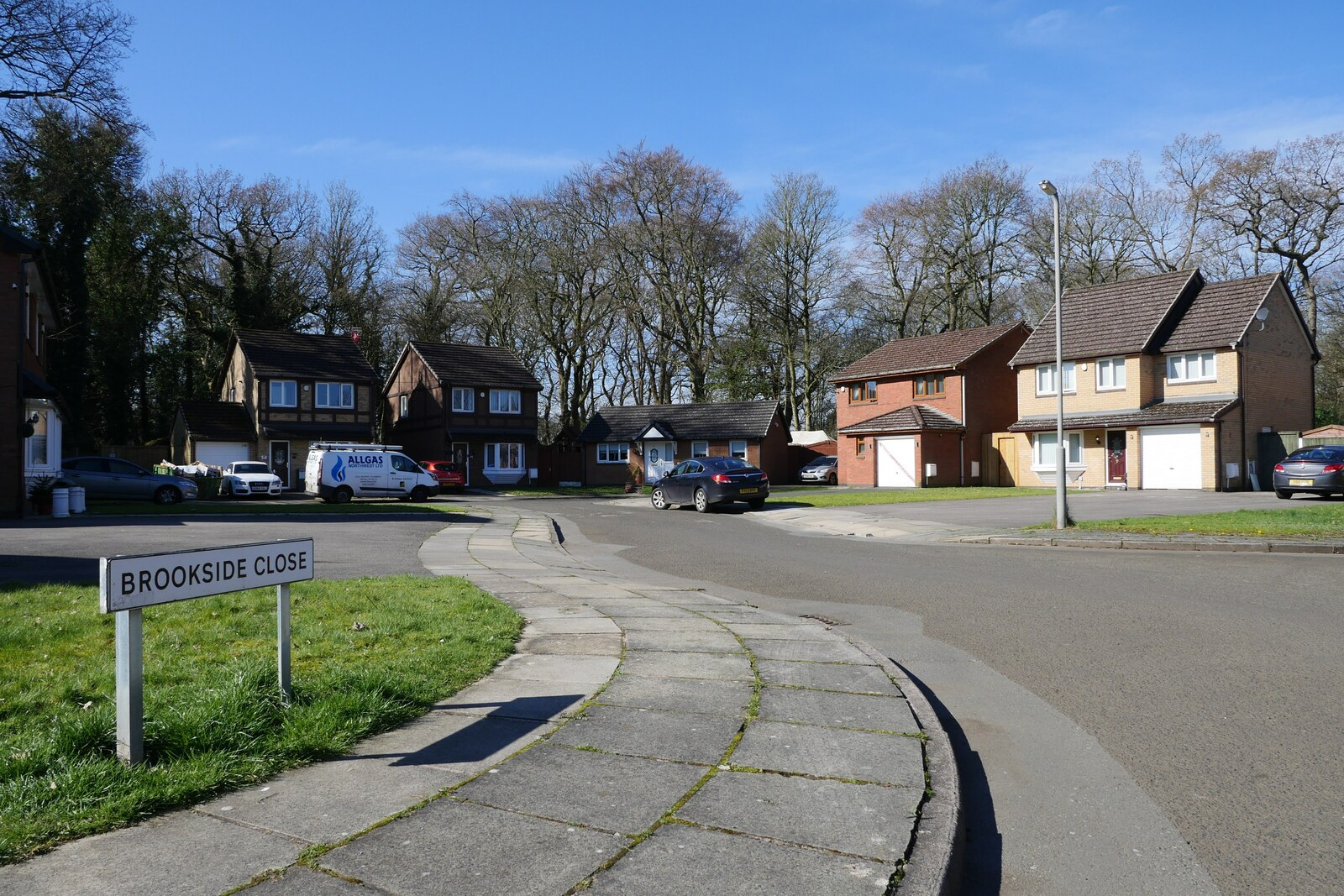
The Close in April 2023

Auctioneers SHM Smith Hodgkinson announced in February 2008 that they would be taking offers on the houses, considering bids in the region of £2 million. It was later reported in November of that year that the properties would be auctioned off collectively with a guide price of between £500,000 and £625,000. Actor Dean Sullivan tried to purchase the properties, leading to speculation that Brookside may be revived, but an unnamed Liverpool-based buyer purchased all thirteen proeprties in December 2008 for a total of £735,000. Restoration of the houses for occupancy was completed in February 2011, with the houses integrated into the estate surrounding them.

In 2021, former Brookside actor Ray Quinn revealed he had begun a new career laying carpet during the coronavirus pandemic, with one of his first jobs being to lay carpet at one of the renovated Brookside Close houses.

In 2023, Ricky Tomlinson reprised his character Bobby Grant for a promotional segment aired during that year's Eurovision Song Contest, which was being held in Liverpool. In it, he attached Ukrainian-themed bunting to the garage of Number 5, the former Grant family home.

=== Hollyoaks crossover ===
On 16 August 2025, Channel 4 announced that Brookside would make an on-screen comeback through a crossover episode with Hollyoaks, as part of the latter programme's thirtieth anniversary celebrations. Hollyoaks had also been created by Phil Redmond, and it was previously established that the programmes existed in a shared universe when Brookside character Matt Musgrove (Kristian Ealey) transitioned into Hollyoaks in February 2000. The episode will be written by Steve Hughes, who worked on both programmes. Hollyoaks's executive producer Hannah Cheers said: "This episode is a love letter to both [programmes]. Brookside gave birth to Hollyoaks [...] This special feels like a moving and fitting tribute to our origin story and a chance for fans to revisit much-loved Brookside characters in honour of that legacy.". Filming for the crossover would take place on the original Brookside Close after exceptional permission was granted by the Liverpool Film Office.

The first casting announcement for the crossover came on 23 August, when it was announced that Sue Johnston would return as Sheila Grant. Subsequent press releases confirmed the returns of Paul Usher as Barry Grant, John McArdle as Billy Corkhill, Philip Olivier as Tim "Tinhead" O'Leary, Suzanne Collins as Nikki Shadwick, Michael Starke as Sinbad, and Ricky Tomlinson as Bobby Grant. It was also confirmed that the episode would feature a tribute to Brookside's longest-serving cast member, Dean Sullivan, who died in 2023. On 14 October it was announced that, alongside the returning cast, new character Esme Dixon (Yasmin Davies) would appear, Esme being the daughter of Brookside's Jacqui Dixon (Alexandra Fletcher). A broadcast date for the crossover, 22 October 2025, was confirmed on the same day. In the episode, it was revealed that Hollyoaks police detective Donny Clark (played by Louis Emerick) was in fact Mick Johnson from Brookside Close after he had staged his death on Brookside over twenty years earlier. His daughter Gemma still lived on the Close, and was integral to the crossover story. It became clear that the developers who wanted to bulldoze Brookside Close at the end of the original series never went through with their plans and the cul-de-sac was now once again filled with families living there. These include Sheila and Billy Corkhill, who are now once again living in Brookside Close after living in Basingstoke for several years, but are now living at No. 5 which was Sheila's home in the 1980s during her marriage to Bobby Grant. Sheila was still in touch with Bobby, who ran a local food bank, and it was implied they had recently had a fling. Barry Grant was also seen at no. 5 but it was not clear if he lived there or was simply visiting his mother. At No. 8, Tim "Tinhead" O'Leary and Nikki Shadwick were living together, presumably as a couple. Thomas "Sinbad" Sweeney was also seen in the episode, now working as a taxi driver, and Brookside and Hollyoaks creator Phil Redmond was also seen as an unnamed onscreen character in the Close whom Sinbad gives a lift to and makes a comical remark about how the story of his life was "jumping from one drama to another".

== Characters ==
Due to Brookside's emphasis on realism, characters largely avoided falling into the archetypes established by other soaps and were used for a number of "firsts" on British television: original character Gordon Collins (Nigel Crowley/Mark Burgess) became the first openly homosexual regular character on a British soap opera, after his copy of the Gay Times was mistakenly delivered to the Corkhills in 1985, Geoff Rogers (Kevin Carson/Stephen Walters) was the first character with dyslexia to have his journey explored in great depth, and teenage cannabis-smoker Matt Musgrove (Kristian Ealey) was the first British soap opera character to transition between programmes; following the axing of the Musgrove family from Brookside in January 2000, Ealey went on to appear in Hollyoaks between February 2000 and August 2004. More darkly, infant Danny Sullivan (Keiran Poole) became the first child to be murdered on-screen, when he and his pregnant mother Sue (Annie Miles) were pushed from scaffolding through a glass canopy in 1991.

Of the original main cast, only Barry Grant (Paul Usher) was left on-screen by October 1990, and remained a regular character until Usher's departure from the programme in 1995. He returned for a guest stint in 1997 and again for the final episode, which made Usher the only actor to appear in both the first and final episodes. Brookside's longest-running character was Jimmy Corkhill (Dean Sullivan), introduced as the younger brother of established character Billy (John McArdle) for a guest role in 1986 and remaining until the final episode in 2003. Other characters that lasted fifteen years or more include Barry Grant's best friend Terry Sullivan (Brian Regan), local window-cleaner Sinbad (Michael Starke), and schoolgirl Katie Rogers (Debbie Reynolds/Diane Burke).

Although unknown actors were cast in regular roles for realism, recognisable or high-profile names sometimes appeared in guest roles; notable examples include Hilda Braid, Ian Hendry, Timothy Bateson, Paula Wilcox, Mary Tamm, Brian Murphy, Philip Madoc, Colin Baker, Linda Lusardi and Angela Douglas. The 2000 castings of Bernie Nolan and Meg Johnson, as Diane Murray and her mother Brigid McKenna, were the first instances of well-known names appearing in a regular capacity.

Several of Brookside's cast members went on to successful acting careers after their time on the programme, among them David Easter, Gillian Kearney, Sunetra Sarker, Claire Sweeney, Anna Friel, Tina Malone, Nicola Stephenson, Lisa Faulkner and original cast members Ricky Tomlinson, Sue Johnston, Amanda Burton and Katrin Cartlidge.

== Storylines ==
Many storylines in the first decade were topical and hard-hitting, often issue-led, exploring the effects of the early 1980s recession and life under Thatcherism. A strong political undertone was evident in the writing, and characters were clearly aligned with and built around conflicting political ideals. Union reps were often residents of Brookside Close, and their storylines gave audiences a window into the operations of trade unions from the worker's perspective. The show's first high-profile storyline aired in 1984, with the wrongful conviction and imprisonment of fireman George Jackson (Cliff Howells), which created a media hype that drew comparisons to the "Who shot J.R.?" storyline from American soap opera Dallas. The efforts of George's wife Marie (Anna Keaveney) to prove his innocence led to a blurring between fiction and reality, with the Brookside press office receiving five thousand calls from concerned viewers. The rape of matriarch Sheila Grant (Sue Johnston) in 1986 was highly-acclaimed for its realism, in its depiction of the attack and its aftermath on both Sheila and her family; the storyline had been concocted to persuade Sue Johnston to remain on the soap after she expressed an interest in leaving. Date-rape was explored in 1992, after Diana Corkhill (Paula Frances) was assaulted by her friend Peter Harrison (Robert Beck) at a house party; the subject was revisited in 1999, this time involving Nikki Shadwick (Suzanne Collins) and Luke Musgrove (Jason Kavanagh).

Drug addiction was a regular storyline, and was first explored in depth when Heather Haversham (Amanda Burton) married high-functioning heroin addict Nicholas Black (Alan Rothwell) in 1986. The marriage ended when Nicholas tried to persuade Heather into taking the drug; she responded by kicking him out the house, and he died that night of exposure in Sefton Park after overdosing. Heroin addiction returned in the 1990s, when both Jimmy Corkhill (Dean Sullivan) and his son "Little" Jimmy (George Christopher) became involved with consumption and distribution of the drug on separate occasions. In 2002, cocaine addict Terry "Psycho" Gibson (Greg Milburn) featured in the twentieth anniversary episodes, in which he openly and heavily abused the drug. Light-hearted storylines often balanced out the programme, playing on the "scally" element, and often involved window-cleaner Sinbad (Michael Starke) engaging in petty crimes or get-rich-quick schemes.

The 1991 double-murder of Sue (Annie Miles) and Danny Sullivan (Kieran Poole) coincided with the programme's 1000th episode and the introduction of Brookside Parade. Although many suspected Sue's stalker Graeme Curtis (David Banks), it was revealed that the killer was Sue's lover Barry Grant (Paul Usher), the best friend of her husband Terry (Brian Regan). This had long-term impacts on both characters, and eventually led to the disintegration of their friendship, which had lasted since the programme's inception in 1982.

Despite the popularity of "The Body Under the Patio", the storyline signified a shift towards more controversial and sensational plots that attracted criticism to both Brookside and the then-producer, Mal Young. These included a cult led by religious fanatic Simon Howe (Lee Hartney) that blew up Number 5 in a suicide pact, a mysterious unidentified killer virus, and the 1996 Simpson incest storyline. Although attempts were made to shed its reputation for sensationalism and implausibability by returning to grounded, issue-led storylines in 1998, Brookside never managed to recover.

As well as the more outrageous elements, Brookside's storylines also featured adultery, divorce, surrogacy, artificial insemination, armed sieges, mental health, debt, jealousy, domestic rivalry, teenage pregnancy, elder abuse, teacher-student relationships, unemployment, homelessness, attempted suicide and organised crime.

== Production ==
=== Theme music and titles ===
The distinctive synthesised theme to Brookside was composed by local musicians Steve Wright and Dave Roylance; Orchestral Manoeuvres in the Dark's Malcolm Holmes played drums on the track. It was used from the first episode until 28 December 1990. Roylance died in 2006.

In 1984, the Irish singer Dana recorded a version of the theme with lyrics, called "So Clear". She performed the song on several television shows over the summer of 1984. The song was never released commercially, although a music video was produced and was shown on the Channel 4 series Ladybirds which profiled female recording artists.

The theme was updated by Wright following the advent of Dolby Stereo surround sound, and the second version of the music debuted on 31 December 1990. This was the longest-running version of the theme song, and lasted until 31 October 2002. The third and final version of the theme, again rearranged by Wright, first aired on 6 November 2002, and remained until the final episode.

The opening titles changed subtly over the course of the programme, but were largely constant in that they began with high shots Liverpool landmarks like the Royal Liver Building and Liverpool Cathedral, before switching to various shots of Brookside Close and the surrounding estate, ending with a shot of the entire cul-de-sac and the Brookside Close street name sign. Originally, Bobby Grant's (Ricky Tomlinson) blue British Leyland Princess was prominently featured in the final shot of the opening titles on Number 5's driveway; it was later replaced by Frank Rogers' (Peter Christian) purple Ford Cortina during his family's occupancy. After Brookside Parade was incorporated into the programme, shots from there were spliced into the opening titles. The closing credits originally scrolled against a royal blue background, before changing to an aerial view of Brookside Close in 1983. This changed again in 1994 to a birds-eye view of the cul-de-sac.

Both the opening and closing credits were changed in 1999 to incorporate a split-screen box effect that reflected the programme's newly-launched website. The end credits were preceded by a continuity announcement and a preview of scenes from the next episode. This changed again in 2002, with split-screen shots of Brookside Close in daylight and nighttime, preceded by another continuity announcement with a recap sequence. For the end credits of the final episode, the last notes were replaced by the closing sting of Grange Hill's original theme song.

Unlike other soaps, the end credits for omnibus episodes broadcast at Christmas would feature the cast and crew waving directly at the camera for the duration of the credits, before ending with a message from producers wishing viewers a "Merry Christmas".

=== Broadcast format ===
For the first eight years Brookside aired twice a week in prime time on Tuesday and Wednesday, usually at 8 pm, although sometimes not until after the 9 pm watershed. On 18 November 1984, the programme was moved to Monday and Wednesday, although this was changed six weeks later in December to Monday and Tuesday. This continued until 30 July 1988, when Brookside returned to Mondays and Wednesdays. There was discussion that year by Channel 4's new Chief Executive Michael Grade of plans to move Brookside to an earlier 6 pm slot, but this plan was abandoned in favour of the show's first "five-nighter", beginning Monday 26 December, which saw Billy Corkhill (John McArdle) and Sheila Grant (Sue Johnston) officially begin their relationship after months of trepidation.

July 1990 saw the introduction of a third weekly episode, meaning Brookside now aired three times a week on Monday, Wednesday and Friday at 8 pm. Competition came in April 1994 when the BBC's EastEnders began airing three times a week. The new weekly EastEnders episode went out on Monday at 8 pm, clashing directly with Brookside. Channel 4 moved Brookside to Tuesday at 8 pm (initially opposite ITV's The Bill). It remained this way until 2001, when another schedule change saw Brookside broadcast three times a week on Wednesday, Thursday and Friday. In November 2002, following its declining ratings, Brookside was withdrawn from its primetime slot and aired as a single 90-minute episode in its Saturday omnibus slot; from July 2003 until the final episode, the programme was aired on Tuesdays at 11 pm or later, depending on scheduling.

Brookside was the first British soap opera to broadcast an omnibus edition at weekends. This was a part of Channel 4’s Saturday afternoon schedule from its very first weekend on air in November 1982, and originally shown at 5.05pm.

In Wales, S4C aired the programme initially at 6 pm, then at 5 pm, but eventually more regularly at 10 pm.

=== Repeats and streaming ===
Brookside was repeated from its first episode on the UK Living channel from February 1995 to September 2001, airing twice daily at 6.30 pm and 11 pm until 2000, when it aired in a 9.30 am slot. Sky One acquired the repeat rights in 2001, originally airing them at 10.30 am, until they moved the show to an early 3.30 am slot before dropping the show in June 2002, by which point the repeats had reached October 1996. No episodes from late-1996 onwards have ever been repeated on British television.

The first episode of Brookside was repeated on More4 as part of the Channel 4 at 25 celebrations on 1 October 2007. Selected episodes were made available to view on All 4 in 2009.

In January 2023, STV Player signed a deal with distributor All3Media to become the first streaming service to provide every episode of Brookside from the beginning; former cast members Claire Sweeney and Sunetra Sarker praised the decision to relaunch the show. The first episodes were made available to view in February that year. Five episodes a week continue to be uploaded to the platform on Wednesdays.

== Merchandise ==
Brookside was one of the first British soap operas to have classic episodes released on video. In 1989, Channel 4 and Mersey Television released a series of videos showcasing some of Brookside's most memorable episodes and characters up to that point:

- Brookside Classics Volume One: The Siege: This video contained three episodes in an extended 75-minute omnibus that brought together the July 1985 siege storyline, in which mentally disturbed John Clarke (Robert Pugh) held Kate Moses (Sharon Rosita), Sandra Maghie (Sheila Grier) and Pat Hancock (David Easter) at gunpoint, seeking revenge for the death of his elderly mother at the hospital where the trio worked.
- Brookside Classics Volume Two: The Sheila Grant Years: This video featured episodes involving Sheila Grant (Sue Johnston), including her rape by taxi driver Arthur Dutton (James Culshaw) and a night out clubbing with her friend Kathy Roach (Noreen Kershaw).
- Brookside Classics Volume Three: That Man Harry Cross: This video contained three episodes featuring Harry Cross (Bill Dean), initially alongside his wife Edna (Betty Alberge) and later with his friend and housemate Ralph Hardwick (Ray Dunbobbin).
- Brookside: The Women: This video was released in 1994 and featured several of the programme's popular female characters, including Mandy Jordache (Sandra Maitland), Sue Sullivan (Annie Miles) and D.D. Dixon (Irene Marot).
- Brookside: The Teenagers: Released in 1995, this video documents the teenage characters in Brookside including Beth Jordache (Anna Friel), Margaret Clemence (Nicola Stephenson), Damon Grant (Simon O'Brien) and Katie Rogers (Diane Burke).
- Brookside: The Backstage Tour: A behind-the-scenes documentary released in 1995, with the only opportunity to view the 'alternative' ending to the infamous Body Under The Patio Trial from the same year, where Beth and Mandy are proven not guilty of murdering Trevor.
- Brookside: The Men: Released in 1996, this video contained previously unseen footage and interviews with actors documenting the long-suffering male characters of Brookside Close.
- Brookside: The Lost Weekend: A feature-length episode of Brookside released in 1997, continuing a storyline that started on-screen with the kidnap of Lindsey Corkhill (Claire Sweeney). The video contained stronger language and darker themes than the original programme. The episode also saw the returns of, and reunion between, Barry Grant (Paul Usher) and Sheila Corkhill (Sue Johnston), as well as the last appearance of Terry Sullivan (Brian Regan).
- Brookside: Friday the 13th: Another feature-length episode released in 1998 that covered Lindsey Corkhill's "missing" journey to her wedding to Peter Phelan (Samuel Kane), and how it was hampered by her father Jimmy's (Dean Sullivan) involvement with the gangsters that murdered his son, Lindsey's brother Little Jimmy (George Christopher). Sue Johnston returned as Sheila Corkhill, and Bill Dean made a cameo appearance as Harry Cross.
- Brookside: Double Take: A quasi-parody video released in 1999 that featured members of the Brookside and Hollyoaks casts playing alternative characters in a spoof-documentary film.

When the programme's cancellation was announced, there was suggestion by Phil Redmond that Brookside would continue with a succession of DVD releases. Phil Redmond had suggested as early as 1988 when, in an interview with Hilary Kingsley: "Redmond has even suggested the end of Brookside in that way—fittingly inspired and unusual. "Perhaps we will watch a character leave and follow him or her. Brookside will continue with its daily life, but not on-screen any more", he mused.".

The first DVD after the final episode featured Tim "Tinhead" O'Leary (Philip Olivier) and Steve Murray (Steven Fletcher) finally getting revenge on Terry 'Psycho' Gibson (Greg Milburn) in an 85-minute feature called Unfinished Business. The DVD was released in November 2003 to generally poor reviews. A follow-up DVD release entitled Settlin' Up, involving Barry Grant (Paul Usher) tracking down his brother Damon's (Simon O'Brien) killers, did not make the production stages. The story arc had been vaguely referenced during Brookside's final episode. A trail for the film was included in the Unfinished Business extras, and O'Brien had been slated for a cameo as Damon's ghost. Also included was a promo for a 21st-anniversary documentary called Brookside: 100 Greatest Moments. A heavily cut-down version of this documentary also appeared, called Brookside: 10 of the Best.

Another DVD entitled Brookside's Most Memorable Moments and was released on 26 November 2012, and contained 16 classic episodes. After years of campaigning by fans, Brookside Most Memorable Moments was released on DVD in November 2012.

== In popular culture ==
Idle Gossip, a 1986 album by punk rock band Toy Dolls, referred to the popular characters Harry and Edna Cross (Bill Dean and Betty Alberge) in one of the album's tracks, which was entitled "Harry Cross: A Tribute to Edna". The album was released the year after Edna's on-screen death.

Liverpudlian professional wrestler Robbie Brookside (real name Robert Brooks) was given his ring name by promoter Brian Dixon as a reference to Brookside, which began airing two years before Robbie's wrestling debut. His daughter Xia Brookside has also taken the ring name.

== Awards ==
Ceremony	Category	Year	Result	Ref
BAFTA TV Awards	Best Soap and Continuing Drama	1999	Nominated	
BAFTA TV Awards	Best Soap and Continuing Drama	2000	Nominated	
British Soap Awards	Best British Soap	1999	Nominated	
British Soap Awards	Best British Soap	2003	Nominated	
NME Awards	Best TV Programme	1987	Won	
NME Awards	Best TV Programme	1988	Won	
National Television Awards	Most Popular Serial Drama	1995	Nominated	
National Television Awards	Most Popular Serial Drama	1996	Nominated	
National Television Awards	Most Popular Serial Drama	1997	Nominated	
National Television Awards	Most Popular Serial Drama	1998	Nominated	
National Television Awards	Most Popular Serial Drama	1999	Nominated	
National Television Awards	Most Popular Serial Drama	2000	Nominated	
National Television Awards	Most Popular Serial Drama	2001	Nominated	
National Television Awards	Most Popular Serial Drama	2002	Nominated	
Sunday Mirror Soaper Stars	Best Soap	1999	Nominated	

== See also ==
- List of Brookside characters
