= Opera House Casino, Scarborough =

Casino in Scarborough, North Yorkshire, England

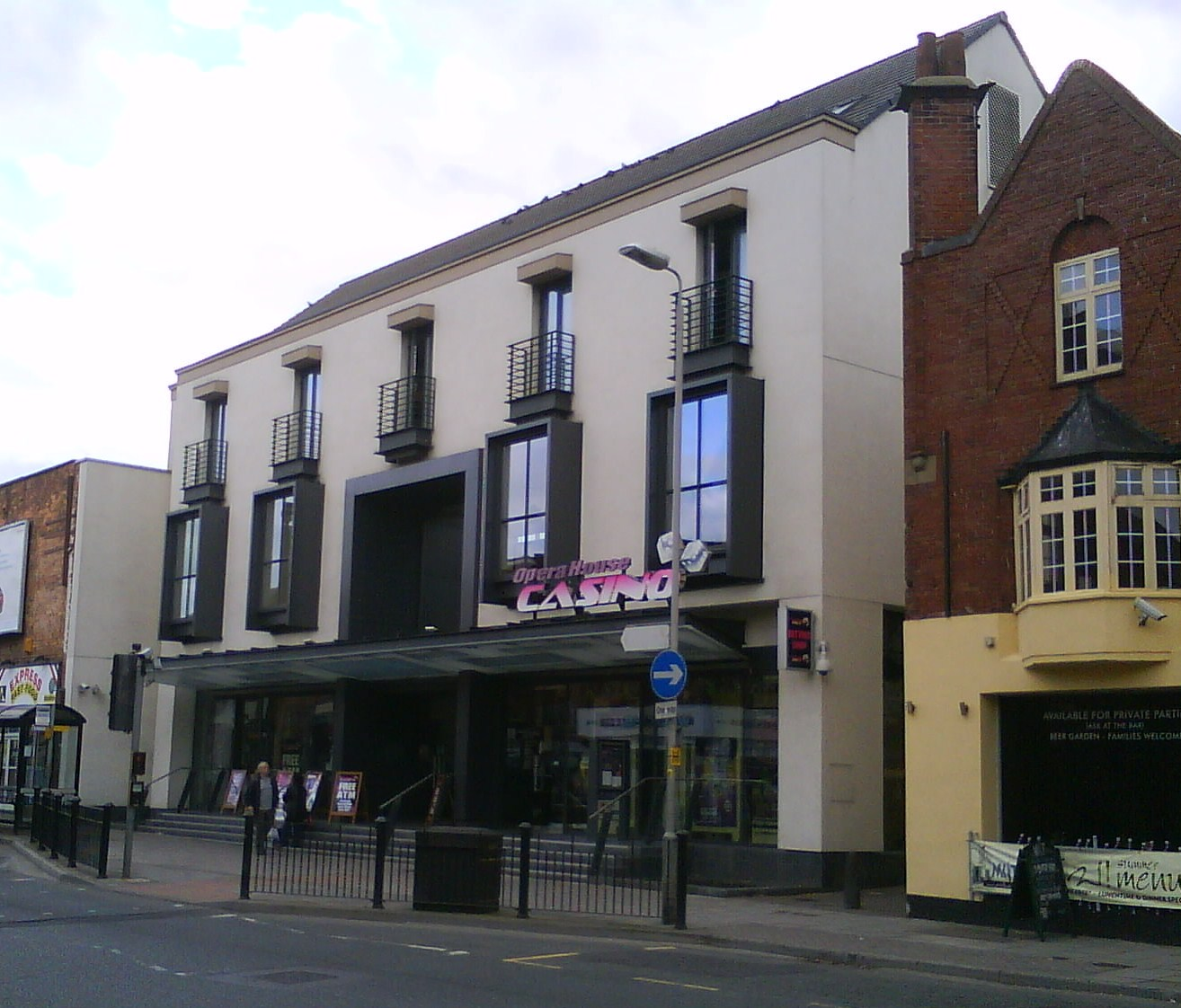
- Opera House Casino, Scarborough
- Interactive map of Opera House Casino
- Location: Scarborough, North Yorkshire, England; 56–64 St Thomas Street, Scarborough, North Yorkshire. YO11 1DU; 54.28414°N 0.400455°W
- Opened: 26 October 2005
- Theme: European Style
- Owner: Nikolas Shaw
- Architect: Frame International
- Website: http://www.operahousecasino.co.uk

The Opera House Casino is a casino located in Scarborough, North Yorkshire, England. It took three years to build and was expected to employ about 110 people, when it opened in October 2005.

The casino was a £7 million development funded by the Shaw family, headed by Nikolas Shaw and was the biggest entertainment investment in Scarborough for over thirty years. It was the first privately funded casino in the UK since the gambling laws were amended by the Gambling Act 2005.

The casino is some 23,000 square feet (2,100 m^{2}) in size. On opening it was reported to have eleven gaming tables, twenty electronic gambling terminals and the same number of slot machines, and a number of bars. It holds Texas Hold'em Poker tournaments in one of its bars where up to 55 players can be seated.

The casino broke British records by signing up over 5,000 members before it had even opened.
