= Anna Keaveney =

English actress (1949–2004)

Ann Keaveney (5 October 1949–20 November 2004) was an English actress best known for her role as Marie Jackson in the Channel 4 soap opera Brookside, in which she appeared in over 100 episodes from 1983 to 1985.

== Brookside ==
Keaveney's character in Brookside, Marie Jackson was an acid-tongued, aspiring middle-class wife and mother from a rough Liverpudlian council estate, and is considered one of the most memorable characters from the early years of the series. Marie was first introduced in February 1983 as the interfering and strong-willed sister of original character, Petra Taylor. One of the only characters ever to be seen regularly smoking in Brookside, Marie was fiercely protective of her family, and was characterised as feisty and confrontational. Following Petra's disappearance and suicide, Marie and her family move into Brookside Close in July 1983.

A stand out episode from January 1984 featuring Marie saw her brawling in the middle of Brookside Close with neighbour, Sheila Grant, played by Sue Johnston. Both Marie and Sheila had to be pulled apart by their respective husbands, while the upper middle-class Collins family drove through the middle of it all in their brand new Austin Maestro. The scene has since been praised for effectively characterising the class caste of the British suburbs in the 1980s, where Thatcherite home ownership policies significantly changed demographics, so that those on the way up the property ladder can now just as easily find themselves living next door to those on the way down. Marie and the Jackson family represented the "working class" living on the newly built, "posher", Brookside Close.

Writers then involved the Jackson family in a long-running social injustice storyline during mid to late 1984, which saw Marie's husband, George, played by Cliff Howells, wrongly convicted of armed robbery. Keaveney decided to leave Brookside and informed producers of her decision following the acrimonious departure of Cliff Howells. She informed producers in October 1984 - six months before the end of her current contract. Ian Brandes from The Sunday People reported that Phil Redmond originally tried to convince Howells and Keaveney to remain in Brookside for at least another year because of their popularity, but this proved unachievable due to the dispute with producers. Her last onscreen appearance as a regular was in April 1985, where viewers saw Marie and the twins move to Leeds to be closer to George's prison. She returned in June 1985 one last time (during episodes 275 and 276), to facilitate the departure of her sister, Michelle Jones (Tracey Jay).

== Later TV and Film roles ==
Keaveney went on to appear in the comedy series Divided We Stand (1987); an episode of Birds of a Feather (1989–98, BBC) as a Green Party election candidate in 1990; the same year she appeared in another comedy, Stay Lucky (1989–93) and the following year, she appeared with Rik Mayall in The New Statesman.

She appeared in the films Shirley Valentine (1989) as Jeanette - a character similar in style to her earlier role as Marie Jackson - married to Dougie, played by George Costigan; The 51st State, and in several other TV series including Ali G Indahouse, Gimme Gimme Gimme, Emmerdale, The Bill, A Touch of Frost, Footballer's Wives, Within These Walls, and Peak Practice. Keaveney had a small part as Nellie in Mike Leigh's Vera Drake and a further role as Rose Pickering in Where the Heart Is. In 1998 she also played Kitty Dodds in the 24th episode of the seventh series of Heartbeat. In 2004 she made her final film appearance as Mrs. Bain in Asylum which was released in 2005 after she died.

== Death ==
She died of lung cancer in 2004, aged 55.

== Selected filmography ==
Year	Title	Role	Notes
1983-85	Brookside	Marie Jackson	Regular role (113 episodes)
1989	Shirley Valentine	Jeanette	
1991	Emmerdale	April Brooks	4 episodes
1993	The Young Americans	Katie Arnold	
1998	Owd Bob	Janet MacPherson	
1999	Plunkett & Macleane	Lady Marchant	
1999	Whatever Happened to Harold Smith?	Woman in street	
2000	Gimme Gimme Gimme	Sheila	TV episode
2001	Merseybeat	Gwen Harrow	Episode "Unexploded Bombs"
2001	The 51st State	Shirley DeSouza	
2002	Ali G Indahouse	Secretary	
2004	Vera Drake	Nellie	
2005	Asylum	Mrs. Bain	(final film role)
