= Alexandra Pigg =

British actress (born 1962)

- Born: Sandra McKibbin; 1962 (age 63–64); Knotty Ash, Liverpool, England
- Occupation: Actress
- Spouse: Peter Firth (m. 2017)

Alexandra Pigg (born Sandra McKibbin; 1962) is a British actress who first came to prominence as Petra Taylor in the TV soap opera Brookside. Her best-known film appearances are as Elaine in Letter to Brezhnev (1985), for which she was nominated for a BAFTA award, and as Bridget Baines in A Chorus of Disapproval (1988).

== Early life ==
Pigg was born as Sandra McKibbin but later changed her name to Alexandra Pigg for her acting career. She is from the Knotty Ash area of Liverpool. Pigg attended the Holly Lodge Girls' Grammar School in Liverpool. To finance and gain a union card to enable her acting career, Pigg became a nightclub dancer. She would dance with her pet snake, named Emma.

== Career ==
In 1982, she portrayed Petra Taylor, with her husband Gavin played by Danny Webb, in the series Brookside.

Following her role in the 1985 film Letter to Brezhnev, she starred in the BBC film Smart Money (1986), A Chorus of Disapproval (1988) with Anthony Hopkins and Jeremy Irons, Strapless (1989) with Bridget Fonda, Chicago Joe and the Showgirl (1990) with Kiefer Sutherland and Emily Lloyd, Bullseye! (1990) starring Michael Caine and Roger Moore, and Immortal Beloved (1994) with Gary Oldman.

She was originally cast in the role of Kochanski in the pilot episode of Red Dwarf but was unavailable for new recording dates following an electricians' strike, so the part then went to Clare Grogan.

== Personal life ==
Pigg has been married three times, first to film director Bernard Rose with whom she has a daughter. When Rose was developing Candyman, Pigg was to play the lead character Helen, with their friend Virginia Madsen to play to role of Helen's friend, Bernie. The choice was then made to make the character of Bernie African American so Madsen lost the part. As shooting was about to commence, Pigg discovered that she was pregnant so the role of Helen was offered to Madsen. Pigg was then married to producer Tarquin Gotch with whom she has two children.

She was interviewed with her Letter to Brezhnev co-star Peter Firth on BBC Breakfast in April 2017, during which Firth explained that they dated briefly after making the film and that they have been in a relationship since 2010. They married in London on Christmas Eve 2017.
