= Paul Usher =

English actor (born 1961)

- Born: 20 April 1961 (age 65); Liverpool, United Kingdom
- Occupation: Actor
- Years active: 1978–present
- Television: Brookside; The Bill; EastEnders
- Spouse: Charlotte Usher
- Children: 2

Paul Usher (born 20 April 1961) is an English actor. He is known for his roles as Barry Grant in the Channel 4 soap opera Brookside and Des Taviner in the ITV drama The Bill. In 2019, he began appearing in the BBC soap opera EastEnders as Danny Hardcastle.

== Career ==
Usher made his television debut in an episode of Z Cars as a gang member. In 1982, he began appearing in the Channel 4 soap opera Brookside as Barry Grant. He also appeared in Liverpool 1 and London's Burning and starred in Six Bend Trap. In 1999, he appeared in Swing as Liam Luxford. In 2001, he began appearing in The Bill, an ITV police drama, as PC Des Taviner. He continued in the role until 2004, appearing in a total of 135 episodes.

In March 2019, it was announced that Usher would join the cast of the BBC soap opera EastEnders. He portrays the recurring role of Danny Hardcastle. In May 2023, he appeared in an episode of the BBC soap opera Doctors as Terry Exton.

In August 2025, it was announced Usher would reprise his role of Barry Grant as part of the 30th anniversary celebrations of Hollyoaks in a special crossover episode with Brookside.

== Personal life ==
Usher was educated at Wirral Grammar School for Boys. He met his wife, Charlotte, while working on The Bill. They married in Rhodes and have one child, Lucas. His son from a previous marriage, James, died in 2014.
