= Goteo =

Crowdfunding site

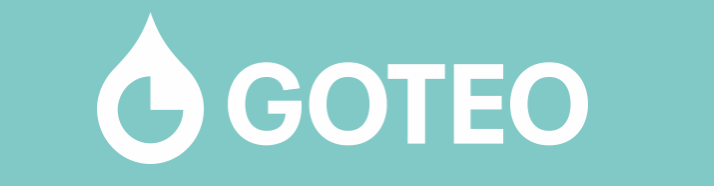
- Website type: Crowdfunding for donations
- Available in: English, Spanish, and other 9 languages
- Headquarters: Barcelona, {{{location_country}}}
- Owner: Goteo Foundation
- Creator: Platoniq non-profit
- Website: https://goteo.org
- Launched: November 3, 2011; 14 years ago
- Current status: Active

Goteo is a crowdfunding site which focuses on projects which, apart from giving individual rewards, also generate a collective return through promoting the commons, open source code and/or free knowledge. It allows contributions in the form of monetary donations or in the form of tasks collaborating with the projects. The platform started in 2011, and is run by the Barcelona-based non-profit Goteo Foundation. According to its site statistics, as of 2023, it has raised $17 million, with a rate of project success of 83% (90% in recent years), and a community of 185.000 users. It claims it was the first free/open source crowdfunding platform, and it tags itself as "the open source crowdfunding platform".

== History ==
The website started in 2011 as an initiative of Platoniq, a non-profit focused on civic participation and social innovation since 2001. In 2012, Platoniq creates the Goteo Foundation to manage the platform, and open sources the platform source code under an AGPLv3 license.

From 2014 to 2017, it received active support from the European Cultural Foundation, organizing Goteo workshops internationally. In 2014, it won the European Democratic Citizenship Award as "NGO of the Year" by the European Civic Forum. The same year, it also won the distinction award Prix Ars Electronica in the Digital Communities category.

Since 2018, it started partnering with funder organizations which have their own "channels" in the platform, including the participatory political party Ahora Madrid, the Barcelona city council, Fiare ethical bank, and the University of Málaga. In the past, it also reached partnerships with cultural portal Europeana, the International University of Andalucía, the regional governments of Extremadura and Basque Country, and the city councils of Zaragoza and Gipuzkoa.

== Features ==
Goteo claims its main distinctive features as a crowdfunding platform, in comparison with other larger ones like Kickstarter, are the following:

- Its requirements of openness for the projects, which need to contribute to free culture or the commons in some way.
- It enables participants to contribute as volunteers for the projects, and not just with money. According to its statistics, more than 4,000 people volunteered from 2011 to 2020.
- It is supported solely by a non-profit foundation, the Spanish Goteo Foundation, enabling tax deduction of the donations.
- Its code is free/open source and it has an open API. This enabled other platforms to fork and use their code freely, and the emergence of several apps using their API. In the same line, it provides open data about some behaviours and statistics of the platform activity regarding projects and donations, as well as in relation to Sustainable Development Goals.
- It claims to have its own methodology, maximizing transparency, legal guarantees, and good practices before and after the campaigns. They also use agile methodologies to organize workshops and trainings to help people optimize crowdfunding campaigns.
- It enables other sources of income for projects: it partners with public and private institutions that do match funding and it enables successful projects to carry out a second campaign round for an "optimal" amount.

== Projects ==
The platform supports a broad diversity of projects, as long as they respect their openness requirements. According to its statistics, the largest categories of projects are social (20%), cultural (15%), education (15%) and environmental (13%). Other projects include technological (10%), entrepreneurship (9%), communication (8%) and scientific (7%).

The top 10 funded projects all received 60-100K€, and covered different types of journalism (investigative, feminist, political, fact-checking), migrant-made clothing, a documentary, a reforestation effort, and a children magazine, a primary school. Other smaller funding projects have received press attention, such as those for art experimentation, local cinema, food delivery co-ops, pollution-free schools, programming education, or an anti-eviction platform.

== International recognition ==
The platform was highlighted by Nesta, and The Guardian included it in its "10 social innovators to watch". It was selected by Crowdsourcing Week in its 2019 "Top 15 Crowdfunding Platforms in Europe". It was mentioned as a salient example of platform cooperative by the Transnational Institute, and as an example of "quiet activism" by news sites Phys.org and The Conversation. Goteo belongs to the European Crowdfunding Network, which highlighted it as one of its three case studies of civic crowdfunding experiences. The OECD highlighted it in its analysis of civic crowdfunding. It has appeared in several research articles around crowdfunding, both in reviews of the field or as a case-study.

Its source code was forked and deployed in Japan, rebranded as the platform Local Good Yokohama, supported by the City Council of Yokohama and Accenture. This platform has received widespread attention in Japanese media.

== See also ==
- Crowdfunding
- Spacehive
- Ioby
