= The Hunger Site =

Click-to-donate site

- Website type: click-to-donate site
- Owner: CharityUSA
- Creator: John Breen
- Website: thehungersite.com
- Commercial: Yes
- Registration: Optional
- Launched: June 1999; 27 years ago

The Hunger Site is the original click-to-donate site created in 1999 that gets sponsorship from advertisers in return for delivering users who will see their advertisements. The Hunger site encourages visitors to click a button on the site, once per day, asserting that each unique click results in a donation "equivalent" to 1.1 cups of food. The Hunger Site is not a charity; it is a for-profit corporation which donates the revenue from its advertising banner to selected charities. Currently, these are Millennium Promise, Food Recovery Network, Partners in Health, Feeding America (formerly America's Second Harvest) and Mercy Corps.

== History ==
The Hunger Site was started by John Breen, a computer programmer from Bloomington, Indiana, in June 1999. Originally a 501(c)(3) non-profit corporation, the site became popular rapidly. "[T]he response was soon so overwhelming that he spent most of his time administering the site even though he received no income, loans, grants, or donations to compensate him for his time and effort or pay his expenses." Faced with increasing costs, Breen sold the site to GreaterGood, "a Seattle-based online shopping mall that gave part of its sales to charity" for an undisclosed amount in February 2000. In July 2001, following the dot-com bubble crash, GreaterGood ceased operations after losing $26 million in venture capital. In 2001, CharityUSA.com, LLC, a privately held, for-profit company based in Seattle, assumed control of the company for one million dollars. CharityUSA owns and operates various click-to-donate-sites. CharityUSA currently claims that 100% of the website's sponsor advertising revenue is paid to the aforementioned non-profit partners. The Commercial Fundraiser Profile Report page on the Secretary of State's web page for the state of Washington calculates the percentage that CharityUSA returns to its charity clients as being 17% of the company's total revenue (labeled as contributions, although the company's explanation on the same page defines this as mix of contributions and sale of products). The same explanation of operations covers how the overall operation of all the GreaterGood Network sites work and reads in part:

The total amount of contributions received by CharityUSA.com, LLC from the public in fiscal year 2008 was $1,382,750. Of that $1,382,750, 100% was given to charity. There were no deductions taken from amounts given to charities for fundraising costs or credit card processing charges. Other "contributions" shown above were from actual sales of product and advertising. An additional $1,532,685 was paid to charities on product and advertising sales in 2008.

In 2007, the company founded the 501(c)(3) nonprofit GreaterGood.org, and it now publishes annual updates of the donations from its various programs at that site. Daily updates of the results of the "Click to Give" program also can be found at The Hunger Site's home page.

In 2008, a Feeding America press release stated that the "partnership between Feeding America and The Hunger Site began in 2000 and has generated over $250,000 to date, which translates into 4,000,000 meals made available to Feeding America's network of food banks nationwide. During the past year alone, The Hunger Site has generated nearly $100,000 in donations for Feeding America."

Vicki Escarra, President and CEO of Feeding America, was quoted in the same release as saying, "We at Feeding America could not be more thrilled about our partnership with The Hunger Site. People lead very busy lives these days and The Hunger Site is user-friendly and an easy way for people to donate and become engaged in the fight against hunger. The increase in Internet donations throughout the past year illustrates the importance of making it easy for citizens to donate online. We look forward to continuing a long and successful partnership with The Hunger Site."

In 2023, it launches "Click for Paws" to help pets in needs.

== Mechanics ==
According to Snopes.com, "[e]ach sponsor donate[s] the approximate cost of 1/4 of a cup of food to the United Nations' World Food Program for each user who clicks on the site during the day." In 2005, Martin Lewis from The Guardian speculated that The Hunger Site probably does not make money for every click, only on clicks to the sponsor's sites, and those clicks might be worth 30¢ each. Each click on the "feed the starving" button he estimated as worth 0.7¢, based on average click-through rates. The Hunger Site gets most of its traffic from the US.

Several websites were operated by GreaterGood in association with the Hunger Site were reorganized after CharityUSA.com bought GreaterGood. The Child Survival Site, The Kids AIDS Site, and The Landmine Site became rebranded into The Child Health Site. CharityUSA.com then added to the GreaterGood Network of websites by creating The Breast Cancer Site, The Animal Rescue Site, The Rainforest Site, and The Literacy Site.

CharityUSA.com claimed 66,235,889 cups of food were donated by click-throughs in 2008.

Results displayed at The Hunger Site store stated "To date, more than 300 million visitors have given more than 500 million cups of staple food. The food funded by clicks at The Hunger Site is paid for by site sponsors and distributed to those in need by Mercy Corps and Feeding America (formerly America's Second Harvest). 100% of the site's sponsor advertising fees goes to our charitable partners. Funds are split between these organizations and go to the aid of hungry people in over 74 countries, including those in Africa, Asia, Eastern Europe, the Middle East, South America and North America."

== Affiliated pages ==
- Charity USA (GreaterGood Homepage)
- GreaterGood site
- The Alzheimer's Site
- The Autism Site
- The Breast Cancer Site
- The Diabetes Site
- The Literacy Site
- The Veterans Site
- The Rainforest Site
- The Animal Rescue Site
- Click for Paws

== See also ==
- Freerice
- Por Los Chicos
- Ripple (charitable organisation)
- The Non Profits (free donations directory)
- Free Kibble (click-to-donate for dogs and cats)
- Clique Alimentos (feed hungry in Brazil, By clicking on the company's logo, it commits to donating 1 kg of food to the selected city's food bank.)
