= Campus Kitchen =

A Campus Kitchen was an on-campus student service program that is a member of the nonprofit organization, The Campus Kitchens Project. At a Campus Kitchen, students use on-campus kitchen space and donated food from their cafeterias to prepare and deliver nourishing meals to their communities.

The organization was headquartered in Washington, D.C., on the campus of Gonzaga College High School.

In 2019, Campus Kitchen merged with Food Recovery Network, an organization doing similar work. Campus Kitchen chapters were transitioned into Food Recovery Network chapters.

== Operations ==
- Each Campus Kitchen is hosted by a school who shares space in one dining hall's kitchen, which is termed the "Campus Kitchen." (Usually, this space is used during less busy or off-hours for the dining hall, such as evenings and weekends.)
- Students go to dining halls and cafeterias at designated times to pick up unserved, usable food. (The dining services companies who donate are protected from liability concerns under the Bill Emerson Good Samaritan Food Donation Act.)
- Students prepare meals using that donated food, as well as food from local food banks, restaurants, grocery stores and farmers markets.
- Then, students deliver meals free of charge to individuals and agencies in the school's neighboring community in need of food assistance. Agencies include homeless shelters, food banks, soup kitchens, and individuals or families in need of food assistance.
- Student volunteers also provide empowerment-based education to clients, such as nutrition education to children, healthy cooking classes to families and culinary job training to unemployed adults.

== History ==
The Campus Kitchens Project was developed in 2001 as a national outgrowth of DC Central Kitchen, a successful local community kitchen model in Washington DC.

In 1989, Robert Egger, founder and CEO of DC Central Kitchen, pioneered the idea of recycling food from around Washington DC and using it as a tool to train unemployed adults to develop valuable work skills. DCCK became a national model, and as the idea grew, and groups around the country started to open kitchens, Robert started looking for a way to engage the thousands of underutilized school cafeterias and student volunteers in the effort, particularly in rural communities. In the mid-1990s, he piloted a job training program in 10 schools across the U.S. with the American School Food Service, with funding from the USDA.

In 1999, two Wake Forest University students, Jessica Shortall and Karen Borchert, created a small student organization called Homerun that engaged students in cooking and delivering dinners to folks in the community. What started as a hobby instead became a successful campus organization. After graduating, Borchert came to work at DCCK.

In 2001, the two concepts came together, and with a start-up grant from the Sodexo Foundation, The Campus Kitchens Project piloted its first program at Saint Louis University in Missouri.
