= The Rainforest Site =

Click-to-donate website

Rainforest Site
- Website type: click-to-donate site
- Owners: Tim Kunin and Greg Hesterberg
- Creator: None
- Website: therainforestsite.com
- Commercial: Yes
- Current status: Active

The Rainforest Site is a "click-to-donate" website, launched in May 2000, that uses ad-based revenue to conserve land in Ecuador, Mexico, Peru, Paraguay and other locations worldwide. In addition, a portion of funding goes to preserve old-growth forest in the state of Washington United States. The Rainforest Site is owned and operated by Tim Kunin and Greg Hesterberg, co-owners of the for-profit company, CharityUSA.com, LLC.

== Overview ==
The Rainforest site is paid by its sponsors each time someone visits a page with one of the sponsor's ads. The money is then donated to one of several charitable organizations and used to help conserve or preserve rainforest land important to helping sustain biodiversity worldwide. The sponsors will only pay the rainforest site once per click, per person, per day. The site claims that each unique click on The Rainforest Site currently saves 11.4 sq ft (1.06 m^{2}) of land. While The Rainforest Site is not a non-profit website, it claims that 100% of money raised through ad revenue is donated directly to charities. This holds true for all of the click to donate websites operated by CharityUSA, which apparently earn their profit from the sale of merchandise from their websites.

The site raises funds for several charities; The Nature Conservancy, The Rainforest Conservation Fund, The World Parks Endowment, and The Friends of Calakmul.

CharityUSA operates a number of charity-themed advertising and shopping sites, including The Alzheimer's Site, The Autism Site, The Breast Cancer Site, The Child Health Site, The Diabetes Site, The Hunger Site, The Literacy Site, The Veterans Site, The Animal Rescue Site, and The Ecology Fund. CharityUSA is a for-profit company. Although some of the revenue generated by these websites goes to non-profit organizations, a majority of it is claimed by CharityUSA.

Total land conserved

Year	Clicks	"Area saved"
2015	24,266,061	6,350.6 acres (25.700 km^{2})
2014	25,904,774	6,779.5 acres (27.436 km^{2})
2013	24,529,451	6,419.6 acres (25.979 km^{2})
2012	28,175,300	7,373.7 acres (29.840 km^{2})
2011	39,456,096	10,326.0 acres (41.788 km^{2})
2010	39,914,869	10,446.0 acres (42.273 km^{2})
2009	43,944,379	11,500.6 acres (46.541 km^{2})
2008	45,392,545	11,879.6 acres (48.075 km^{2})
2007	30,562,147	8,002.8 acres (32.386 km^{2})
2006	27,745,996	7,261.3 acres (29.385 km^{2})
2005	28,115,235	7,358.0 acres (29.777 km^{2})
2004	26,522,578	6,939.9 acres (28.085 km^{2})
2003	23,916,601	7,917.2 acres (32.040 km^{2})
2002	21,526,818	5,633.7 acres (22.799 km^{2})
2001	12,688,459	1,322.8 acres (5.353 km^{2})
2000	15,559,026	4,704.4 acres (19.038 km^{2})

== Affiliated pages ==
- Charity USA (GreaterGood Homepage)
- GreaterGood site
- The Hunger Site
- The Alzheimer's Site
- The Autism Site
- The Breast Cancer Site
- The Diabetes Site
- The Literacy Site
- The Veterans Site
- The Animal Rescue Site
- Click for Paws

== See also ==
- Freerice
- Ripple (charitable organisation)
- The Non Profits (free donations directory)
- Free Kibble (click-to-donate-site for dogs and cats)
