= Les Enfants Terribles (disambiguation) =

Les Enfants Terribles may refer to:

- Les Enfants Terribles, a 1929 novel by Jean Cocteau, its English title being "The Holy Terrors"
  - Les Enfants Terribles (film), a 1950 film of the novel, with collaboration by the author
  - Les Enfants Terribles (opera), an opera composed by Philip Glass, based on the novel
- Les Enfants Terribles (Bouffon Theatre Company), a former American theatre ensemble based in Chicago (2008–2011?)
- Les Enfants Terrible (British theatre company), a British theatre company founded in 2002
- A fictional laboratory project from the Metal Gear video game universe

== See also ==
- Enfant terrible (disambiguation)
- The Infant Terrible, a Marvel Comics character
