= FoodCycle =

Charitable organization providing meals

- Founded: 2009
- Type: Charity
- Purpose: Building Community, Food Poverty, Loneliness and Volunteering
- Location: United Kingdom
- Region served: England Wales
- Key people: Mark Game (Chief Executive Officer), Mary McGrath MBE (Chair of Trustees)
- Volunteers: 10,000
- Website: https://foodcycle.org.uk/

FoodCycle is a charitable organization based in the United Kingdom that uses surplus food from supermarkets, shops and food banks to create vegetarian meals served at "free community restaurants".

FoodCycle community meals run in various locations across England and Wales.

== History ==
In September 2008, Canadian Kelvin Cheung founded FoodCycle. He started the organization after hearing about the US on-campus student service program, Campus Kitchen, where students use on-campus kitchen space and donated food from their cafeterias to prepare meals for their communities. FoodCycle's pilot hubs were at the Imperial College London and the London School of Economics.

== Awards ==
- September 2024, named Medium Charity of the Year, Third Sector (magazine) Awards.
- September 2024, named Charity of the Year: with an income of £1 million - £10 million at the Charity Times Awards
- November 2022, named "Community Partner" by the Food and Drink Federation
- January 2021 Sophie Tebbetts named "Supporting Leader of the Year" at the Charity Times Awards
- March 2010, named "New Charity of the Year" in the Charity Times Awards
- November 2010, received an award from the Arthur Guinness Fund
- January 2011, received the Prime Minister's Big Society Award

== See also ==
- Food waste in the United Kingdom
- Campus Kitchen
