= Diana Corkhill =

Fictional character from Brookside

- Brookside character
- Portrayed by: Paula Frances
- Duration: 1990–1993
- First appearance: 19 November 1990
- Last appearance: 12 March 1993
- Introduced by: Mal Young
In-universe information
- Other names: Diana Spence
- Occupation: Pharmacy assistant
- Father: Freddie Spence
- Husband: Rod Corkhill (1992–1993)
- Uncles: Des

Diana Corkhill (also Spence) is a fictional character from the British Channel 4 soap opera Brookside, played by Paula Frances. The character debuted on-screen during the episode broadcast on 19 November 1990. Diana was introduced as a love interest of the established character Rod Corkhill (Jason Hope) and it was Frances' first television role. Diana is characterised as a kindly soul who is desperate to overcome hardships. Diana works as a sales assistant at a chemist but is hiding a secret about her education. She is the daughter of Freddie Spence (Peter Corey), who disapproves of her relationship with Rod. Writers made their relationship fraught with arguments because of his police career.

Diana does not believe Rod is safe working as an undercover police officer. In one storyline, Diana is jilted on her wedding day because Rod is beaten up and hospitalised by a criminal. Their second attempt at marriage is successful. Writers continued to create problems and Rod is attacked with a knife. Diana forces her husband to quit the police force and change his occupation. Producers entrusted Frances to portray two divisive and controversial stories. The first explored adult learning as Diana reveals she is illiterate. Viewers complained about the story's plausibility because Diana had managed to secure a good job. Brookside's executive producer Mal Young defended Diana, stating that the point of the story was to show Diana could still succeed in life. The other storyline profiled the social issue of date rape. When Diana and Rod's marriage ends, Diana seeks comfort from her good friend Peter Harrison (Robert Beck). He misunderstands Diana's intentions and sexually assaults her. Writers played Peter genuinely believing in his innocence. Diana was adamant that she refused consent and reported Peter to the police. Peter was charged and put on trial for sexual assault and he was later found not guilty. Writers filmed two alternative endings and the cast were initially unaware of the outcome. The date rape story received a divided response from viewers and critics. Frances made her final appearance as Diana in the episode broadcast on 12 March 1993.

== Development ==
=== Casting and characterisation ===
Frances joined the cast of Brookside in 1990 and she made her first appearance that year. Diana was Frances' debut television role having previously following her graduation from the Liverpool Theatre School. When Diana first appeared on-screen, a television journalist used their newspaper column to discuss Frances' breast size and branded her a "heaving bosom". An upset Frances complained to the Brookside wardrobe department and told them about her insecurities. They were sympathetic and decided to change Diana's costumes to make them flattering and pledged to use different camera angles while filming. Frances remained unhappy and would often cry onset. On one occasion, a director insulted Frances and accused her of "acting from the neck up". Frances claimed that the director informed her that he had previously worked with actors insecure about their nose size, but Frances should not try and conceal her figure onset. The incident made Frances cry and she later had a breast reduction on the NHS.

Diana is the daughter of Freddie Spence (Peter Corey), her mother had an affair with a police officer and abandoned her family. Diana is characterised as a "kindly soul" and very forgiving of her loved ones. She has courage and determination to overcome hardships she faces in life. In his book, The Who's Who of Soap Operas, author Anthony Hayward described Diana as "gullible and longing to find a husband". When Diana was introduced into the series she portrayed a sales assistant at a chemist, specifically working behind a perfume counter. In the book, Phil Redmond's Brookside - Life in the Close, author Geoff Tibballs described Diana as a "pleasant girl" who is illiterate and "slow on the uptake". Throughout her tenure, writers portrayed Diana gaining a newfound confidence and becoming less reliant on men.

=== Relationship with Rod Corkhill ===
Producers introduced Diana as a new love interest for the established character Rod Corkhill (Jason Hope). They meet when Diana goes to her local supermarket and meets Rod where he poses as a trainee manager. Rod is actually a police officer posted at the supermarket, working under cover. He cannot tell Diana his true profession but asks her out on a date. They begin dating and Diana's father, Freddie, is delighted that his daughter has found a boyfriend with a career in management. As they spend more time together, Rod decides to reveal that he is a police officer. Hayward assessed that Diana is "furious" and "hurt" that Rod has lied to her. They break up for a short time before entering a serious relationship.

Diana and Rod become engaged and they set a date for their wedding in December 1991. Writers decided to make their relationship problematic and for the characters to have a failed wedding day. Rod's career in the police force unsettled Diana because of the danger it posed to him. Part of Rod's role in the force is working undercover. As their wedding approaches, Rod investigates a male prostitution ring. He focuses on Craig (Paul McNulty), a young prostitute whom he wants to free and arrest the pimp. Rod is then ordered to abandon the investigation. On the day of his wedding, Rod disobeys his orders and tracks down Craig. Rod follows Craig into the toilets at Liverpool Lime Street railway station where his pimp is waiting and Rod is beaten up. His injuries cause Rod to miss his wedding as he is taken to hospital. Diana breaks up with Rod and he is suspended from the police force. Hope defended Rod jilting Diana because of his job responsibilities. He told Tibballs that Rod has a "strong social conscience" and "he put the problems of Craig the rent boy before his own wedding day." As the story progressed, Rod is reinstated and he and Diana reconcile, eventually setting a new wedding date in July 1992.

Diana and Rod this time opt for a quiet wedding ceremony at a registry office. They attempt to keep it a secret but Rod's grandmother, Julia Brogan (Gladys Ambrose) tells Rod's uncle Jimmy (Dean Sullivan) and aunt Jackie Corkhill (Sue Jenkins). Together they organise a surprise wedding party for Diana and Rod. Frances told a reporter from TVTimes that "for once Julia's big mouth turns out to be a blessing!" Frances explained that the ceremony was intentionally different to their cancelled wedding. It was supposed to be a "white wedding" with traditional attire and horses and carriages. Frances explained that Diana and Rod "didn't want to tempt fate, so they planned a short simple one instead." The wedding was filmed in a conference room inside the studio at Mersey TV. Frances was "relieved" to become an official member of the Corkhill family. She added that Diana "is very conventional and marriage is something she's always wanted. She is a home-maker and really loves Rod. I think they will be very happy together." This time Diana and Rod's marriage is successfully with their family in attendance.

Writers had different plans for the couple and hindered their married life with arguments caused by Rod's career. Hope knew that their marriage would be turbulent. He told Tibballs that "So, now he just wants the steady lifestyle, which is what he thinks he's got with Diana. But he's got a nasty shock in store." Diana is shocked when Rod takes part in a raid at the hair salon on Brookside Parade. Rod is slashed with a knife and the ordeal prompts Diana to force Rod to quit the police force. To appease her, Rod secures a new job as a security guard in Warrington. Diana's new found confidence and her friendship with Peter Harrison (Robert Beck) cause yet more problems for the pair. During another argument, Rod loses control of his anger and slaps Diana in the face and subsequently moves out. As the pair break up, Rod puts the Corkhill's home up for sale and Diana moves in with the Farnham family.

=== Illiteracy ===
Producers created a divisive storyline for Diana, exploring the issue of adult illiteracy. Diana excels at hiding her illiteracy to the extent that her police officer boyfriend fails to notice it. Frances told Geoff Tibballs, author of Brookside - The First Ten Years, that the illiteracy story showed the difficulties people face completing daily tasks. She noted that illiterate people find it hard to read assembly instructions and fill out forms, and that made her realise the severity of the issue. Frances portrayal of the subject received praise from viewers. She told Tibballs that she received positive fan mail thanking her. She explained that "It made people feel that they're not on their own, even at 20." Frances liked the story because it helped viewers understand Diana better and "it explained why Diana always seemed a bit slow. But now that her confidence has grown, she's becoming more independent of Rod, particularly since they got married."

Brookside's executive producer Mal Young told Tibballs that the story divided viewer opinion. He stated that Diana's illiteracy "threw up a lot of feedback from viewers". Many felt it implausible that Diana could be illiterate and have a good job. Young defended the character because illiterate people are good at hiding it. He added "that was the whole point. She had a career, she worked in a pharmacy, and she got through life." In addition pharmacies wrote to the producers to complain that Diana worked in a pharmacy. They felt it portrayed their profession in a negative way because pharmacists need to be accurate when dealing with patient prescriptions. Young had been careful to ensure that Diana only shown working on the make-up counter rather than the medical side of the chemists. Adult education groups praised the soap opera for its portrayal and "taking illiteracy seriously". To coincide with the story, Brookside participated in the Adult Learners' Week campaign, which was an organised effort to promote adult participation in learning. On-screen, writers remained committed to solving Diana's illiteracy and portrayed her attending learning classes.

=== Date rape and departure ===
"It is a horrific situation, she thought he was her friend, and then he took advantage of her. But she felt she couldn't tell anyone what had happened because they had been friends and it would look as if she had led him on."

— Frances on Diana's date rape ordeal. (1992)

Producers created a controversial storyline for Diana exploring the issue of date rape. The story plays out after Diana has an argument with Rod and she spends time with her friend Peter at a party at the Farnham residence. Peter invites Diana into a bedroom at the party where they share drinks and he comforts her. Peter then admits he has romantic feelings for Diana and sexually assaults her. Frances told Linda Hawkins from ME magazine that the story is realistic. She explained that women like Diana are tempted to remain silent in the situation because blame themselves for willingly entering a man's home to begin with. Frances found it difficult to portray the issue. She told Hawkins that "the problem with this role was to imagine Diana's feelings, when I have never been a victim. I could only imagine her vulnerability because, frankly, everyone in my family knows how to look after themselves." To help portray the story, Frances recalled a time when she auditioned for an equity card. She had to dance in a revealing costume in front of men and noticed them staring at her. Frances had that experience firmly on her mind when filming, which conveyed Diana's realisation of Peter's true intentions. Beck told Hawkins that the storyline was realistic and relevant to issues existing in society, where men have casual and comedic views on sex and consent. He added "with an attitude like that you can see how easily date rape can occur."

Diana is shocked that her friend would rape her and fears that her friends will think she is a liar. Frances told Inside Soap's Renee Shaw that it is a "horrific situation" for Diana. She believed that Peter was her trusted friend, but "he took advantage of her." Diana fears that everyone will think she led Peter on because of their friendship and tried to remain quiet. Frances researched the issue thoroughly and was shocked to learn that a high percentage of rapists are already known to their victims. She told Shaw that the fact "amazed" her and learning that this date rape scenario was a common occurrence made her more cautious. Frances also hoped that Diana's story would help rape victims come to terms with their ordeals. She added that the story showed that no man has the right to override a woman's decision when she declines sex.

Diana decides to go to the police and report Peter for raping her. He is arrested, charged with sexual assault and a date is set to take the case to court. Beck told an Inside Soap journalist that Peter does not believe he raped Diana, despite her saying no. Beck explained that "Peter doesn't think of himself as a rapist, and so he is very confused by the accusations that he raped Diana against her will." The story was divisive among viewers and Beck believed that Peter had gained viewers' support because Peter genuinely believes he did not rape Diana. He added "he has a kind of naivety about him which stops him from being hated." Beck was unaware that his character would become a rapist when he joined the cast. Beck was "perturbed" when he read the script and producers warned him that he may receive abuse from the viewing public. However, Beck was shocked that some viewers believed "Diana asked for it and lead him on, but I just don't agree. If he got his signals mixed up, that's his problem, not hers." Beck added that Diana telling Peter 'no' once was enough and he should have respected her more.

Writers decided to add suspense to the court case and keep the outcome a secret from the cast members involved in the story. They also ordered that two alternate endings to the trial be filmed, one with a guilty verdict and the other an innocent verdict. Writers also chose the characters involved in portraying the issue to be already acquainted. Beck described the case as not being a "cut and-dry situation". Beck thought it was important that Peter was punished for his treatment of Diana. She and Peter were friends, to which Beck assessed that "it isn't as if he was a total stranger who attacked her in a dark alleyway - but having said that, what he did was wrong, and he shouldn't be allowed to get away scott free."

Writers decided that the outcome of the trial should be a not guilty verdict. The scenes played out with Diana being unable to convince the jury of Peter's guilt. Unlike Diana, Peter gained a witness willing to testify his innocence with the Farham's nanny Anna Wolska (Kazia Pelka). Rod returns for the trial but when he hears the not guilty verdict, he accuses Diana of having an affair with Peter, ends their marriage and leaves once again. Diana is unable to cope with the outcome and tries to commit suicide by cutting her wrists. Diana survives her ordeal and Peter tries to comfort her. She is outraged and tells Peter to leave her alone, informing him that whilst the jury did not find him guilty, she would always know he had raped her. In the episodes leading to Frances' departure from Brookside, Diana secures a job at the bar La Luz. She is fired from the role after she is harassed by a group of men and retaliates by throwing a drink at them. Diana then stopped appearing in the show, it was later revealed that she remained in Liverpool, living with her father, Freddie. Peter remained in the series but writers continued to portray the issues that arise after an accusation of rape. Diana's uncle Jimmy continues to support Diana's version of events. He blames Peter for Diana leaving with her life in ruins and begins to harass him. Beck told Donna Hay from What's on TV that "everyone's sympathies were with Diana. No one stopped to think that Peter might be emotionally scarred by it as well."

== Reception ==
Author Geoff Tibballs believed that Diana's illiteracy story was inspiring. He profiled Diana, stating that "she may never set the world alight with her contribution to nuclear physics but her courage and determination in overcoming illiteracy serve as an example to others." A TVTimes writer assessed that Diana's marriage to Rod was problematic. They opined, "they've had more than their fair share of problems in the 18 months they've known each other [...] they have weathered a suspected pregnancy, Diana's illiteracy and a temporary split." Referencing Diana's ditzy characterisation, Geoffrey Phillips from the Evening Standard branded her a "bubblehead blonde".

Suzanne Moore from The Guardian was unsympathetic in regards to Diana's date rape ordeal. She scathed that "whatever the writers' intentions to dramatise the issues of date rape, I would guess that, for many viewers, this would have been the correct verdict. Maybe he went too far but then she did lie down with him." Patrick Hill writing for the Daily Mirror branded the date rape plot a "controversial storyline". In response to the date rape story, Linda Hawkins from Me stated that "Brookside has never fought shy of dramatising social problems [...] the circumstances and scenes are harrowing." She also opined that "Diana has been an almost perpetual victim for the last two years. Paula's portrayal of Diana is compelling and thoroughly believable." Renee Shaw of Inside Soap thought that Diana and Rod's relationship was "rocky to say the least" and her being raped left her "life in tatters". A writer from Soap opined that she faced "trauma" and "Diana couldn't face the wagging tongues and accusing stares" so she left Brookside for good. Writers from Inside Soap included Diana's date rape ordeal in their "Golden moment in soaps" feature. They questioned whether Peter was even guilty because he was Diana's "knight in shining armour" and Diana "had no reservations" about drinking with him. Inside Soap ran a feature compiling "The 100 greatest soap stories ever told". They featured Diana's rape story as their 71st choice. In the book Real Soap: Brookside, author Kay Nicholls branded the character "dippy Diana" and referred to her pursuit of justice against Peter as a "golden" storyline.

In the 1996 book, "The Guinness Book of Classic British TV", its authors were unsure of what the production team were trying to achieve with Diana's storyline, other than "other than to reflect the complexity of date rape." Vicki Coppock, writing for the radical feminist magazine, Trouble & Strife was critical about Diana's date rape. Coppock stated that Brookside was "acknowledged for its attempt to deal with the emotional turmoil of a rape trial." But she believed that unlike the audience support for Sheila Grant (Sue Johnston) during her rape storyline, "viewers had little previous sympathy" for Diana. Coppock believed that writers were too ambiguous about whether Diana had been raped. She added it "was presented very equivocally, reinforcing a range of popularly-held prejudices about the validity of women's experiences and testimonies relating to male violence." She believed that Peter's acquittal would not have been an issue if writers had presented it as a reflection of "the difficulties women have in seeking justice through the law." She concluded that Brookside broadcasting the storyline during an era women were receiving backlash over date rape allegations in Britain was unhelpful.
