= Ray Anderson (entrepreneur) =

American businessman (1934–2011)

- Born: July 28, 1934
- Died: August 8, 2011 (aged 77); Atlanta, Georgia, U.S.
- Known for: Founder and chairman of Interface Inc.

Ray C. Anderson (July 28, 1934 – August 8, 2011) was founder and chairman of Interface Inc., one of the world's largest manufacturers of modular carpet for commercial and residential applications and a leading producer of commercial broadloom and commercial fabrics. He was known in environmental circles for his advanced and progressive stance on industrial ecology and sustainability.

Anderson died on August 8, 2011, aged 77, twenty months after being diagnosed with cancer. On July 28, 2012, Anderson's family re-launched the Ray C. Anderson Foundation. with a new purpose.

Originally created to fund Ray Anderson's personal philanthropic giving, family members announced the rebirth and refocus of the Foundation on Anderson's birthday, nearly one year after his 2011 death. The purpose of the Ray C. Anderson Foundation is to perpetuate shared values and continue the legacy that Anderson left behind. The Ray C. Anderson Foundation is a not-for-profit 501(c)3 organization whose mission is to promote and advance the concepts of sustainable production and consumption.

== Life and career ==
Anderson was an honors graduate of the Georgia Institute of Technology in the school of industrial and systems engineering in 1956. He learned the carpet trade through more than 14 years at Deering, Milliken & Company and Callaway Mills.

Anderson founded Interface in 1973 to produce the first free-lay carpet tiles in America. Interface is one of the world's largest producers of modular commercial floorcoverings, with sales in 110 countries and manufacturing facilities on four continents.

== Environmental focus ==
Anderson first turned his focus toward the environment in 1994 when he read The Ecology of Commerce by Paul Hawken, and also Ishmael by Daniel Quinn, seeking inspiration for a speech to an internal task force on the company's environmental vision.

In 2009, Anderson estimated that Interface was more than halfway towards the vision of “Mission Zero,” the company's promise to eliminate any negative impact it may have on the environment by the year 2020 through the redesign of processes and products, the pioneering of new technologies, and efforts to reduce or eliminate waste and harmful emissions while increasing the use of renewable materials and sources of energy.

Anderson chronicled the Mission Zero journey in two books, Mid-Course Correction: Toward a Sustainable Enterprise: The Interface Model (1998), and Confessions of a Radical Industrialist: Profits, People, Purpose: Doing Business by Respecting the Earth (2009).

== Recognition and awards ==
Anderson was featured several documentaries and films, such as The Corporation, (2004 Canadian documentary); The 11th Hour (2007 Leonardo DiCaprio film); I Am (2011 Tom Shadyac documentary); Big Ideas for a Small Planet (Sundance Channel series); and others. The Interface story is the focus of the documentary film “So Right, So Smart” (2009).

Ray served a stint as co-chair of the President's Council on Sustainable Development during President Clinton's administration, which led to him co-chairing the Presidential Climate Action Plan in 2008, a team that presented the Obama Administration with a 100-day action plan on climate. Together, he and Interface funded the creation of the Anderson-Interface Chair in Natural Systems at Georgia Tech, where Associate Professor Valerie Thomas conducts research in sustainability.

Anderson received a host of accolades throughout his life, including:

- In 2007, he was named one of Time’s Heroes of the Environment.
- Inaugural Millennium Award from Global Green, presented by Mikhail Gorbachev (1996)
- Recognized by Forbes magazine and Ernst & Young, which named him Entrepreneur of the Year in 1996.
- The American Society of Interior Designers Design for Humanity Award (2010)
- The inaugural Global Sustainability Prize from the University of Kentucky Tracy Farmer Institute for Sustainability and the Environment (2010)
- River Guardian Award from the Upper Chattahoochee Riverkeeper (2010)
- Sustainability Award from the Women's Network for a Sustainable Future (WNSF), the first time the WNSF has honored a businessman (2010)
- Pillars of EARTH Sustainable Leadership Awards given by EARTH University in Costa Rica (2010)
- Purpose Prize from Encore.org (2007)
- Auburn University’s International Quality of Life Award (2007)
- George and Cynthia Mitchell International Prize for Sustainable Development (2001)

Under Anderson's leadership, Interface was named to CRO magazine's (formerly Business Ethics magazine) 100 Best Corporate Citizens List for three years. In 2006, Sustainablebusiness.com named Interface to their SB20 list of Companies Changing the World, and in 2006 GlobeScan listed Interface #1 in the world for corporate sustainability.

Anderson was former Board Chair for The Georgia Conservancy and served on the boards of the Ida Cason Callaway Foundation, Rocky Mountain Institute, the David Suzuki Foundation, Emory University Board of Ethics Advisory Council, the ASID Foundation, Worldwatch Institute, and the Arizona State University Global Institute of Sustainability Advisory Board. He was on the Advisory Boards of the Harvard Medical School Center for Health and the Global Environment and the Upper Chattahoochee Riverkeeper.

He was awarded 12 honorary doctorates from Northland College (public service), LaGrange College (business), N.C. State University (humane letters), University of Southern Maine (humane letters), The University of the South (civil law), and Colby College (law), Kendall College of Art and Design (art), Emory University (science), Central College in Pella, Iowa, (humane letters), Chapman University (humane letters), Clarkson University (science), and the Georgia Institute of Technology (philosophy).

Anderson's papers were donated to the Georgia Historical Society by the Ray C. Anderson Foundation and Interface, Inc. in late 2015. The collection, which includes biographical materials, business records, correspondence, organizational records, photographs, presentations, speeches, writings, travel files, and books, is available at the Georgia Historical Society's Research Center in Savannah. The online finding aid can be found here.
