= Goteo (disambiguation) =

Goteo is a Spanish crowdfunding site.

Goteo may also refer to:

- "Goteo" (song), by Duki
- "Goteo", a song by Paloma Mami
- Goteo, a 2021 EP by Sangre Nueva, DJ Python and Florentino
