= Project Drawdown =

- Founded: 2014
- Founder: Paul Hawken, Amanda Joy Ravenhill
- Type: 501(c)(3) nonprofit
- Location: St. Paul, Minnesota
- Executive director: Jonathan Foley
- Website: drawdown.org

Project Drawdown is a 501(c)(3) organization registered in Minnesota, that focuses on publish research and reports for the most "actionable" ways to reduce greenhouse gas emissions. Their organization is named after the concept of "drawdown" or the point in the process of climate change mitigation where there is a decline of atmospheric carbon through carbon sinks. The organization was founded to facilitate research and has grown beyond the original the success of the 2017 book Drawdown The organization is a 4 star charity on Charity Navigator.

The organization is known for publishing research based guides such as the "Solutions Library", Drawdown Explorer and Shift that document actions individuals and policy makers could take in order to advance climate change mitigation. Based on the 2017 book they also publish annual "updates" or "reviews" of the recommendations made in the book.

== History ==
The organization was found by Paul Hawken and activist Amanda Joy Ravenhill in 2014. The organization's first major publication was a book called "Drawdown" published in 2017. Following the book, the project has continued to focus on "advancing science-based climate solutions and strategies around the world."

As the organization grew, several important contributors to the project have become import climate communicators, include CEO and scientist Jonathan Foley who also has given Ted talks as part of his organizational leadership; and Katharine Wilkinson a senior writer of Drawdown (2017), and editor-in-chief of The Drawdown Review (2020).

=== Book ===
Drawdown: The Most Comprehensive Plan Ever Proposed to Reverse Global Warming is a 2017 book created, written, and edited by Paul Hawken about climate change mitigation. Other writers include Katharine Wilkinson, and the foreword was written by (hardback edition) Tom Steyer and (paperback) Prince Charles.

Drawdown provides a list of 100 potential solutions and ranks them by the potential amount of greenhouse gases each could cut, with cost estimates and short descriptions. The solutions are arranged in order by broad categories: energy, food, women and girls, buildings and cities, land use, transport, materials, and "coming attractions".

The Guardian notes that the author has had influence in corporate sustainability efforts and that companies such as Interface and Autodesk have backed the project.

== Research approach ==
The organization's main activity is research about the most promising technologies and solutions for climate change; and ranks them on dimensions of scale and feasibility, with literature review based scholarly reports. In the annual reviews, they put forward multiple scenarios for implementing the global targets, such as the 1.5 degree target set by the Paris Agreement. The focus of the research process is on the "Climate solutions that are already here", instead of speculative technologies that have yet to reach scalability.

Their communication and research strategy focuses heavily on solutions like afforestation and stopping deforestation and food waste, as well as deploying well proven technologies like closing emission producing factories and implementing solar. In 2019, their list included 80 solutions with proven implementation practices, and 20 that hadn't been scaled yet.
