= Marianne Ali =

American chef (1957–2017)

Marianne Ali (1957 – August 30, 2017) was an American chef who graduated from L'Academie de Cuisine in Maryland, who worked at DC Central Kitchen for more than 20 years and became the director of their Culinary Job Training Program in 2005.

== Education ==
In 1974, when Ali was 17 years old, she started using drugs, later she decided to take 12th-grade English to become self sufficient, but the drug use stopped her to from reaching her goals.

In 1994, after 20 years drug use, Ali looked for help and got detoxified and rehabilitated at the Marian House. The nuns who worked there referred her to a L'Academie de Cuisine. She funded her career with aid money and studied in their Gaithersburg, Maryland campus. L'Academie de Cuisine was a cuisine school founded in 1976 by Francois Dionot, it closed in 2017 after 41 years due to financial problems.

== Personal life ==
Marianne Ali was born in 1957 and was raised by her parents. Ali got pregnant when she was 19 years old and stopped using drugs for one year, and gave birth to Brandi when she was 20 years old. She then returned to drug use. Her brother died when he was 40.

== Career and activism ==
Ali arrived at DC Central Kitchen in 1997 and worked there for 20 years. In 2005 she became director of the Culinary Job Training Program, a program that empowers unemployed men and women of the Washington metropolitan area, helping more than 1600 people to replace homelessness, addiction and incarceration with careers, helping them in job search, and linking companies in look for workers and new professionals in the service industry, improving their quality of life.

== Awards ==
Ali was named a Champion of Change by the White House in 2014.

== Death ==
Ali died of cancer on August 30, 2017.

== Legacy ==
Marianne's Cafe, the coffee shop at Martin Luther King Jr. Memorial Library is named after her.
