= Care2 =

Activism website

- Company type: Private
- Website type: Social networking, petitioning site
- Available in: English
- Founded: 1998; 28 years ago
- Headquarters: Redwood City, California, {{{location_country}}}
- Area served: Worldwide
- Owners: Care2.com, Inc.
- Founders: Randy Paynter; Matthew McGlynn; Camilla Eriksson
- CEO: Randy Paynter
- Key people: Matthew McGlynn (CTO); Marlin Miller (COO)
- Products: care2.com; thepetitionsite.com
- Employees: >50
- Website: www.care2.com
- Registration: Optional (required for creating petitions)
- Users: 50 million
- Launched: 1998
- Current status: Active

Care2 (stylised as care2) is a social networking website that was founded by Randy Paynter in 1998. The goal of the site is to connect activists from around the world with other individuals, organizations and responsible businesses.

== Overview ==
Care2 members create an online identity by filling out a profile with personal information, as in most social networking sites, but Care2 also asks for more information about its members' personal lives and involvement in activism. The social interactions on Care2 revolve around groups that connect people who care about similar political and environmental issues. Members also often participate in internet petitions and news articles posted by others.

== History ==
Care2 has been used throughout the years to combat, through petitions, political, environmental and civil rights issues. Care2 was used by Broadway theatre playwrights and actors to petition Indiana's Religious Freedom Restoration Act.

=== Security breach ===
On December 28, 2011, hackers attacked, breached and accessed unencrypted password data on Care2 servers.

=== Website change ===
In August 2019, Groups, Healthy Living and Causes, C2NN, eCards, and Care2 Connect were eliminated.

== See also ==
- Click-to-donate site
- List of social networking websites
- Environmentalism
- Change.org
- Avaaz
- Wiser.org
