= Drawdown (book) =

2017 climate change solution book

Drawdown: The Most Comprehensive Plan Ever Proposed to Reverse Global Warming
- Author: Paul Hawken
- Language: English
- Genre: Non-fiction
- Publication date: 2017

Drawdown: The Most Comprehensive Plan Ever Proposed to Reverse Global Warming is a 2017 book created, written, and edited by Paul Hawken about climate change mitigation. Other writers include Katharine Wilkinson, and the foreword was written by (hardback edition) Tom Steyer and (paperback) Prince Charles.

Drawdown provides a list of 100 potential solutions and ranks them by the potential amount of greenhouse gases each could cut, with cost estimates and short descriptions. The solutions are arranged in order by broad categories: energy, food, women and girls, buildings and cities, land use, transport, materials, and "coming attractions".

The Guardian notes that the author has had influence in corporate sustainability efforts and that companies such as Interface and Autodesk have backed the project.

== Reception ==
Drawdown was a New York Times bestseller and received favorable reviews. Kirkus Reviews called the book "an optimistic program for getting out of our current mess".

An April 2017 video on C-SPAN described the book as "a collection of policies, plans, and active programs to reduce carbon emissions outside of the purview of the federal government". In the video, Hawken stated, "the reason we can say 'the most comprehensive plan ever proposed' is that no one's ever proposed a plan... which is sort of astonishing when you think about it." According to an article in Vox, "until 2017, there was no real way for ordinary people to get an understanding of what they can do and what impact it can have".

== Project Drawdown ==
Project Drawdown is a 501(c)(3) organization registered in Minnesota, that focuses on publish research and reports for the most "actionable" ways to reduce greenhouse gas emissions. Their organization is named after the concept of "drawdown" or the point in the process of climate change mitigation where there is a decline of atmospheric carbon through carbon sinks. The organization was founded to facilitate research and has grown beyond the original the success of the 2017 book Drawdown The organization is a 4 star charity on Charity Navigator.

The organization is known for publishing research based guides such as the "Solutions Library", Drawdown Explorer and Shift that document actions individuals and policy makers could take in order to advance climate change mitigation. Based on the 2017 book they also publish annual "updates" or "reviews" of the recommendations made in the book.
