= Ripple (charitable organisation) =

Click-to-donate website

- Website type: Charity, click-to-donate site
- Creators: Simon Griffiths, Jehan Ratnatunga, Mack Nevill and Matthew Tilleard
- Website: www.ripple.org
- Commercial: No
- Launched: May 4, 2007; 19 years ago
- Current status: No longer active (for search engine)

Ripple was a non-profit click-to-donate internet site and search engine which passed 100% of its revenue to other charities. Launched on May 4, 2007, they generated revenue through sponsorship and advertisements. Ripple.org was named #23 in BRW Top 100 web 2.0 sites of 2008.

The co-founders of Ripple were Jehan Ratnatunga, Matthew Tilleard, Mack Nevill and Simon Griffiths, a graduate from Melbourne University.

As of March 2017 Ripple.org only contains a link to WaterAid Australia.

== Features ==
The Ripple web site generated revenue through clicking and search.

A user could click to choose a preferred form of charity, bringing up an advertisement from a sponsor. The sponsor paid Ripple every time an advertisement is viewed, Ripple assigns the sponsor payment to the charity of the web user's choice.

Users could use the in-built search engine, powered by Google Co-op. Each search generated advertising revenue.

Ripple also had an interface through online social networks such as Facebook and MySpace. Users were able to add applets that function in the same way as the Ripple web site to their profiles and display how philanthropic they are via a 'contributions' count.

== Impact ==
Ripple supported the WaterAid Australia, Oxfam, Oaktree Foundation, and the Grameen Foundation. In 2008, Matthew Tilleard expressed the goal of adding a "carbon charity" and including up to ten charities on the site. Although the affiliate marketing and search interface techniques are not new, donating all proceeds to charity is rare, according to Lia Timson writing in The Age.

== See also ==
- Freerice
- The Hunger Site
- The Rainforest Site
