= The Old Vic Tunnels =

Arts venue and performance space in London, England

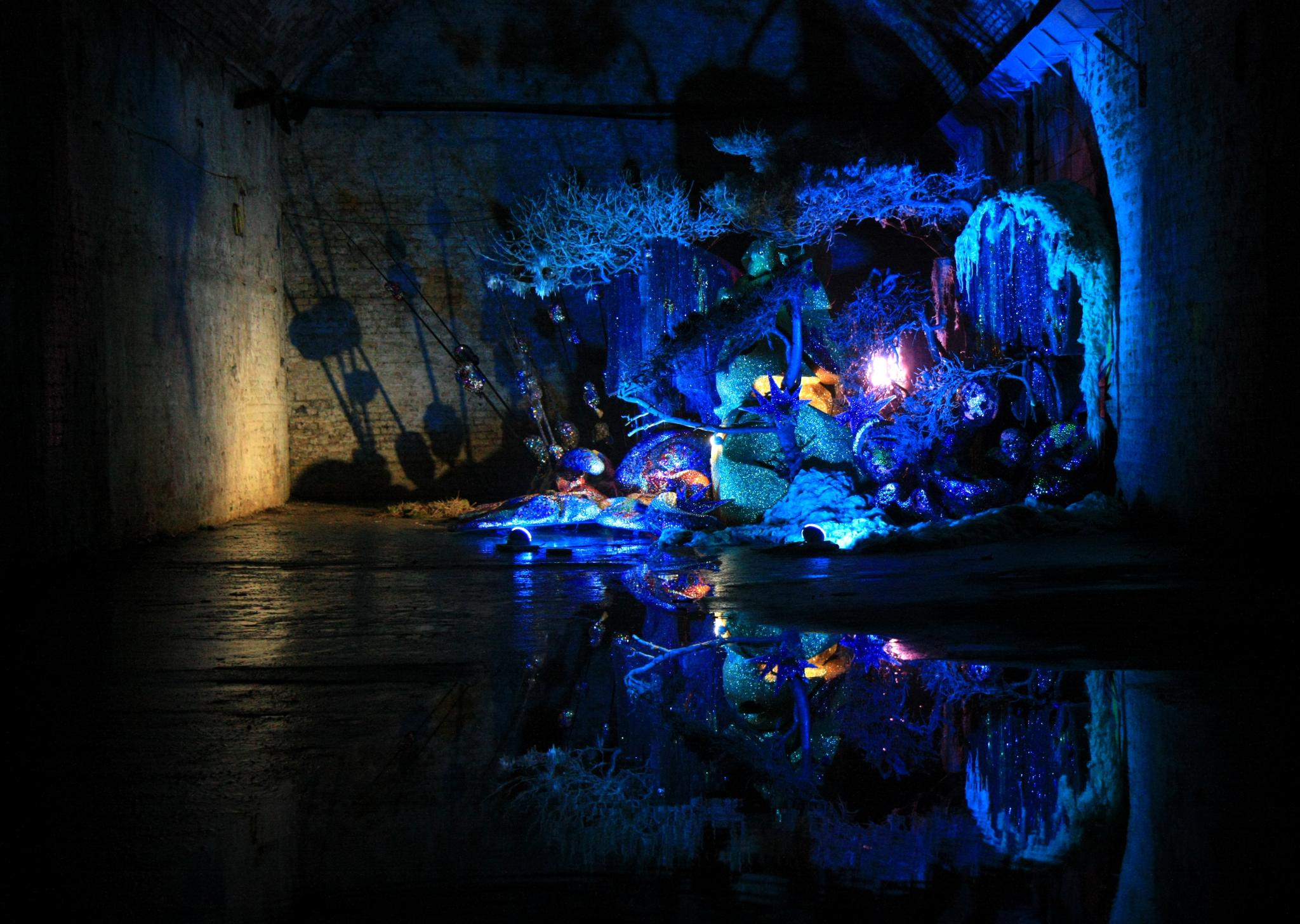
- "The Majesty", a 2012 event at The Old Vic Tunnels.
- Interactive map of The Old Vic Tunnels
- Address: Station Approach Road; Lambeth, London; United Kingdom
- Coordinates: 51.5022°N 0.1096°W
- Owner: Old Vic Theatre Trust; Chief Executive Sally Greene
- Type: Non-profit Producing Theatre; Director: Hamish Jenkinson

Construction
- Opened: 2008
- Closed: 2013

The Old Vic Tunnels was an underground arts venue and performance space beneath London Waterloo railway station. The space consisted of almost 30,000 square feet of unused railway tunnels. It officially opened its doors for the first time in 2009 and closed in March 2013.

In 2010 The Old Vic acquired Tunnels 228–232 from BRB (Residuary) and transformed it into a performance venue. It hosted numerous events including Banksy's UK Premiere of his documentary Exit through the Gift Shop and U.S. President Bill Clinton's latest fundraiser with the Reuben Foundation in May 2012.

In February 2013 it was announced that the Old Vic Tunnels would close its doors on 15 March 2013: "We have three great years to look back on, and are proud of the remarkable range of events and productions that we have presented in the space."

In 2014, Vans won the bidding to operate the Old Vic Tunnels and transformed them into a skate park called the House of Vans.

== History ==
In February 2010, The Old Vic Theatre Trust acquired a new performance space beneath Waterloo station from BRB (Residuary). The venue showcased productions, performances and installations. In 2010, the Old Vic Tunnels opened with the Lambeth Palace, an underground cinema built to screen the UK premiere of Banksy's film Exit through the Gift Shop, followed by the first major theatre production in the space – Ditch, by Beth Steel, a High Tide and the Old Vic Tunnels co-production. The Old Vic Tunnels was home to the British premiere of Scorched, a Dialogue and the Old Vic co-production by award-winning playwright Wajdi Mouawad. The Old Vic Tunnels was presented the Big Society Award by David Cameron in 2011.

The last professional theatre production at The Old Vic Tunnels was Top Story by Sebastian Michael, directed by Adam Berzsenyi-Bellaagh, which ended its run there on 2 February 2013.

After 9 August 2014, the space reopened under new management and the name House of Vans London

== Notable events ==
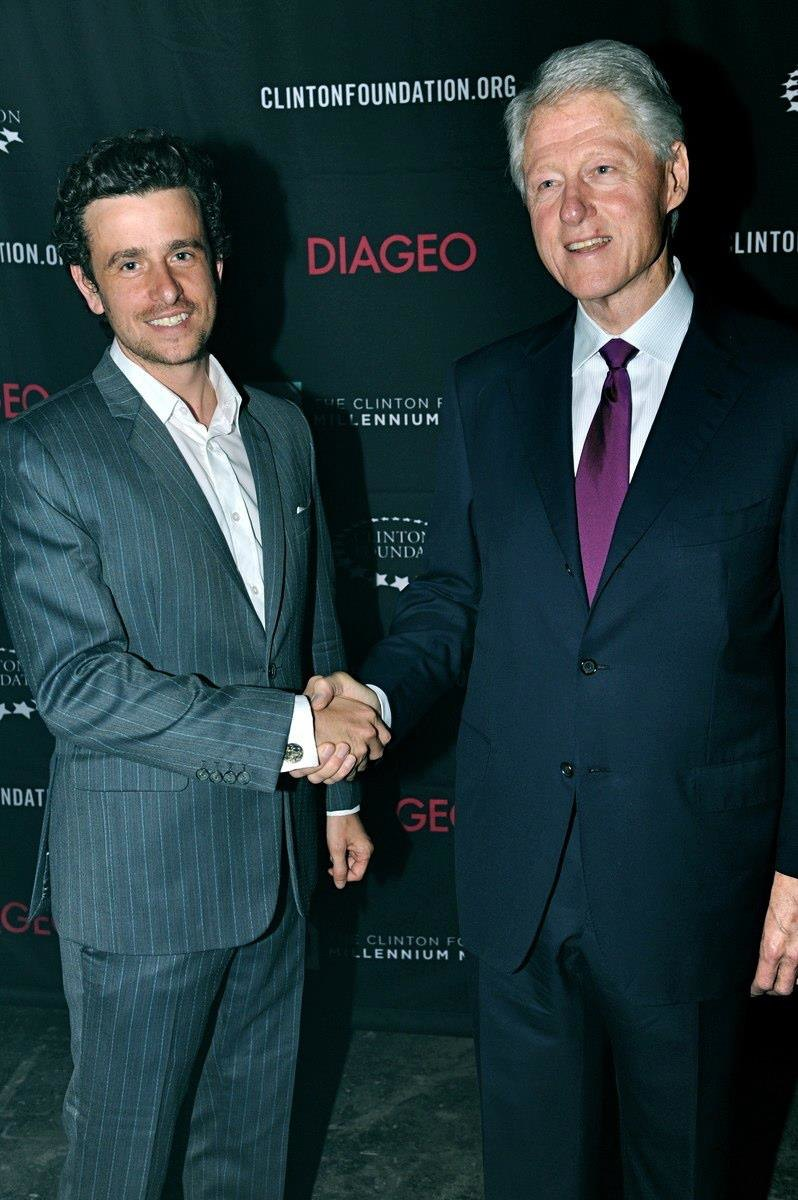
Hamish Jenkinson and President Bill Clinton at the Old Vic Tunnels

The Old Vic Tunnels saw Edward Sharpe and the Magnetic Zeros create five nights of the Wild West on Mars featuring theatre companies and artists Theatre Delicatessen, BattleActs, Les Enfants Terribles and Phil Mann; the New York Dolls perform; Secret Cinema transformed the space into an Algerian market town; a summer term from the National Youth Theatre of Great Britain; Universal's Yellow Lounge and a Michelin Star pop-up restaurant. The Old Vic Tunnels hosted U.S. President Bill Clinton's fundraiser.

== Artists in Residence scheme ==
There was an Underground Artist in Residence Scheme with a resident photographer, graffiti artist, designer, filmmaker and a DJ. Veuve Clicquot sponsored the build of a brand new piano bar which opened outside the Screening Room and Bloomberg continues to provide support as the Old Vic Tunnels Volunteers Partner.

== New technology ==
In December 2011 the Old Vic Tunnels became an official YouTube partner. They rolled out an App for iPhone and Android to give their customers even more access with interactive maps and an integrated social network.

== The Big Society Award ==
In 2011 British Prime Minister David Cameron presented the Old Vic Tunnels with the Big Society Award. In his speech, Cameron said:

This is an incredibly exciting project, bringing together young people from diverse backgrounds and offering them the chance to be part of such a creative and engaging venture at the heart of their community.

Kevin Spacey, on receiving the award:

We're delighted that our work at the Old Vic Tunnels has been recognised with this Award. The Old Vic has always invested a great deal of energy and investment into building programmes that connect with the communities it serves, whether by enabling local residents to watch productions at reduced prices, developing extensive educational initiatives to inspire young people or by encouraging people in our neighbourhood to take the stage and explore new ideas. The Old Vic Tunnels has given us an exciting new space where new talent can develop and where we can extend the reach of our work into the community. It has also allowed us to bring visual artists together with theatre producers and musicians to create truly innovative productions. We're grateful for the support we’ve received so far and excited about the long term future of this unique space.

== See also ==
- Leake Street
