= Social media surgery =

Gathering where volunteers offer free social media advice

A social media surgery is a gathering at which volunteer "surgeons" with expertise in using web tools, chiefly social media, offer free advice in using such tools, to representatives ("patients") of non-profit organisations, charities, community groups and activists, with "no boring speeches or jargon".

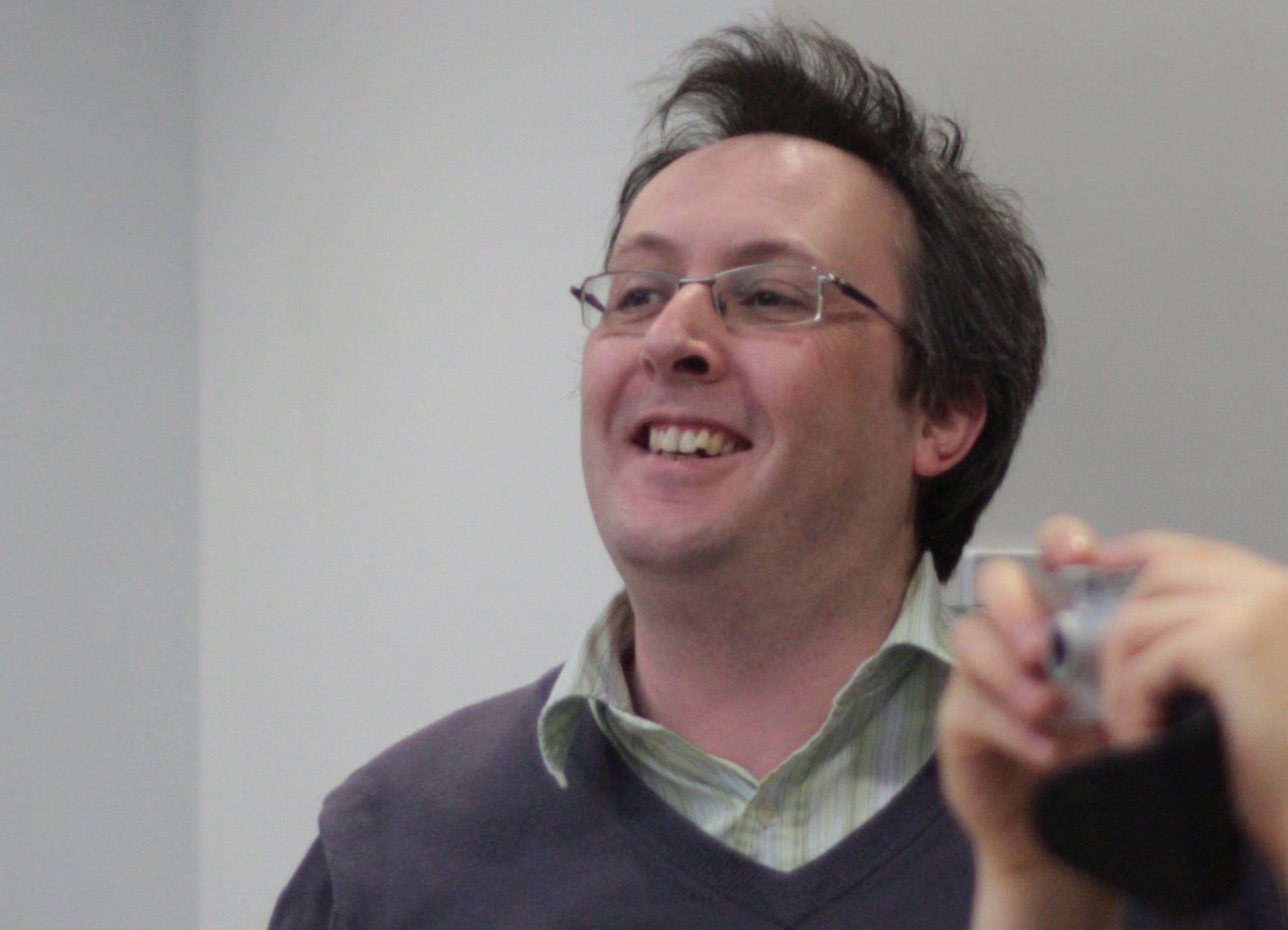
Nick Booth, seen in 2009

The idea was conceived by Pete Ashton, with Nick Booth of Podnosh Ltd, who ran the first such surgery in Birmingham, England, on 15 October 2008.

In July 2009, a spin-off surgery (dubbed the "Social media mob") started in Mosman, Australia, and in January 2010, the first spin-off surgery in Africa was held.

On 16 February 2012, it was announced that the Social Media Surgery movement had won "the Prime Minister’s Big Society Award".

Prime Minister David Cameron said:

This is an excellent initiative - such a simple idea and yet so effective. The popularity of these surgeries and the fact that they have inspired so many others across the country to follow in their footsteps, is testament to its brilliance.

Congratulations to Nick and all the volunteers who have shared their time and expertise to help so many local groups make the most of the internet to support their community. A great example of the Big Society in action.

The scheme also won the 2013 Adult Learners' Week "BBC Learning Through Technology Award".
