= Enfant terrible =

Enfant terrible or Enfant Terrible may refer to:

- Enfant terrible (folklore), an African mythological character
- Enfant Terrible (film), a 2020 German drama film

== See also ==
- Les Enfants Terribles (disambiguation)
- The Infant Terrible, a Marvel Comics character
