= European Crowdfunding Network =

The European Crowdfunding Network AISBL (ECN), is a professional network promoting adequate transparency, (self) regulation and governance while offering a combined voice in policy discussion and public opinion building. ECN was founded in 2011 as an interest group and formally incorporated as an international not-for-profit organisation in Brussels, Belgium in 2013. It aims at innovating, representing, promoting and protecting the European crowdfunding industry as a key aspect of innovation within alternative finance and financial technology, as a funding mechanism for small and medium-sized enterprises and innovative projects. The founding chairman was Oliver Gajda.

== Purpose ==
The ECN has three main areas of activity: Raising professional standards, networking opportunities and industry research and promotion.

=== Mission ===
- Promote crowdfunding as a viable offering of job creation, social innovation and boost to entrepreneurship to the European public, policy makers and stakeholders
- Providing resources, professional support and a forum for collaborative action regarding crowdfunding
- Publicize community successes, impacts and scale of ambitions, as well as promote innovative financial solutions for funding social & business projects
- Create and influence the political discourse regarding crowdfunding within the European Union

=== Solutions ===
- Joint platform for self-regulation, transparency and governance issues
- Combined voice in policy discussion and public opinion building
- Increased network through peer-to-peer interaction
- Knowledge exchange and information for stakeholders
- Professional image of crowdfunding due to economies of scale

=== Value Proposition ===
- Raising professional standards – The ECN is engaging in a discourse with policy makers and industry regarding professional standards, best practice and data provision
- Networking opportunities – The ECN is providing opportunities for members from across Europe to meet together, exchange information and ideas, and discuss the latest industry trends and issues.
- Industry research and promotion – The ECN is promoting, conducting or commissioning a wide variety of research on crowdfunding and its impact on economy and society

== Board of directors ==
The non-executive board is elected by the assembly of members every two years. On behalf of the ECN, it assumes the task guiding the secretariat and ensuring strategy is executed, as well as looking into joint problems, preparing reports and taking part in conferences; it elects a chair to represent the interests of its members before any public or private authority and undertakes any other initiative with the aim of furthering these objectives. The non-executive board advises on management and administration and the annual subscription due by members. The ECN board of non-executive directors 2021-2023 was elected on 17 June 2021.

- Chair, Christin Friedrich, Innovestment, Germany,
- Vice chair, Nuno Brito Jorge, GoParity, Portugal
- Vice chair, Jeff Lynn, Seedrs, United Kingdom
- Vice chair, Olivier Houdaille, Lumo, France
- Vice chair, Olivier Schulbaum, Goteo, Spain
- Vice chair, Matthew Caruana, Zaar, Malta
- Member, Coenraad de Vries, OnePlanetCrowd, The Netherlands
- Member, Giacomo Bertoldi, Walliance, Italy
- Member, Nora Szeles, Tokeportal, Hungary
- Member, Reinhard Willfort, 1000×1000, Austria
- Executive director, Oliver Gajda, Germany
- Deputy director, Francesca Passeri, Italy

== Affiliation ==
The ECN had a seat in the European Crowdfunding Stakeholders Forum of the European Commission.

The ECN is registered in the European Commission’s voluntary Register that was set up in the context of the European Transparency Initiative.

The ECN is a member of the European Federation of Financial Advisers and Financial Intermediaries (FECIF).

== Lobbying ==
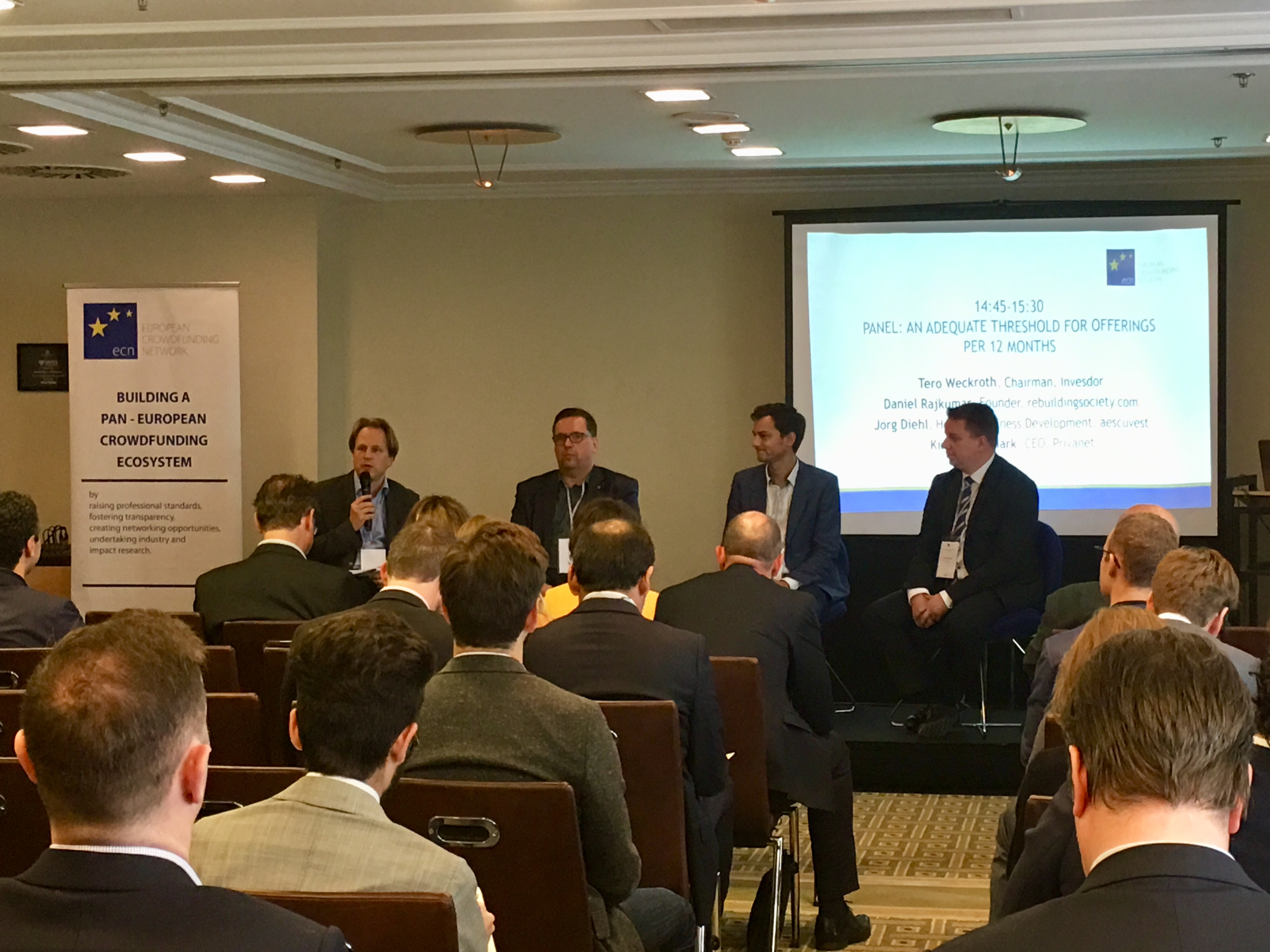
At the 7th ECN Crowdfunding Convention 2018: Defining the future of European Crowdfunding Service Providers, various crowdfunding platform operators gathered to participate in an open discussion with members of the European Commission and European Parliament. This photo is taken from the panel "AN ADEQUATE THRESHOLD FOR OFFERINGS PER 12 MONTHS" Panelists from left to right: Tero Weckroth of Invesdor, Jörg Diehl of aescuvest, Daniel Rajkumar of rebuildingsociety.com and Kimmo Lonmark of Privanet.

On October 18th, the ECN lobbied for changes to the proposed central crowdfunding legislation, in Brussels at the 7th ECN Crowdfunding Convention: Defining the future of European Crowdfunding Service Providers.

Various panels discussed key topics in the proposed legislation, for example, the panel discussion “AN ADEQUATE THRESHOLD FOR OFFERINGS PER 12 MONTHS” was facilitated by ECN members rebuildingsociety.com, Invesdor, aescuvest and Privanet. The event was attended by various members of the European Parliament as well as the European Commission. The panel successfully communicated the merits of a significantly higher threshold, combined with clear risk warnings and industry standardised definitions. The panel successfully influenced the European Parliament, who increased the threshold from €1m to €8m and voted in favour of adoption.

Following the work of ECN and the resulting proposal and adaptation of a European harmonised law for crowdfunding (European Crowdfunding Service Provider Regulation) by the European Legislator, the network has continued its discourse between the European institutions and the crowdfunding sector, aiming at streamlining information exchange regarding national implementation of the new law, for example during its 10th ECN Crowdfunding Convention.
