= City Gateway =

UK charity

City Gateway Limited
- Type: Registered charity
- Purpose: Employment, women's project
- Location: The Pavilion, Import Building, 2 Clove Crescent, E14 2BE, London
- Region served: Greater London
- Services: Youth work
- Revenue: £3.1 million (2011)
- Employees: 103 (2011)
- Website: https://citygateway.org.uk

City Gateway is a charity that provides training for disadvantaged young people in the London Borough of Tower Hamlets and other boroughs of Greater London.

== Services ==
City Gateway works with disadvantaged individuals through community events, drop-in youth clubs and apprenticeship schemes, and gives them the chance to develop their own business ideas. It runs women’s projects, youth training, a youth centre and a social enterprise hub. It is one of the most popular youth projects in the area, and has successfully trained many young people who were formerly not in employment, education or training ("NEETs"). City Gateway's support for young people was described as "incredible" following several awards at the ERDF and ESF London Awards 2011.

As of 2012 it employs 120 people, and has about 60 corporate partners who provide apprenticeships, work experience or mentors.

== History ==
City Gateway was established by a group of people who worked in the City of London and wanted to support the local community. In 2003 it was a small organisation on the point of being wound up when Eddie Stride, a local man who had recently graduated from Cambridge University, joined as a youth outreach worker. Having secured approval from the trustees to keep it going for a year, he raised £40,000 from two corporate sponsors, and began training 15 "NEETs" in job-seeking skills. He was shortly promoted to CEO; by 2008 he had developed the organisation into one with an annual turnover of £1 million, reaching £4.5 million by 2012.

In July 2012 City Gateway won the Prime Minister's Big Society Award.

The Evening Standard selected City Gateway as the partner in its "Ladder for London" campaign, launched in September 2012, asking commercial companies to take on more apprentices.
