= Blessed Unrest =

2007 book by Paul Hawken

- Author: Paul Hawken
- Publisher: Viking
- Publication date: 2007
- Pages: 342 pp.
- ISBN: 978-0-670-03852-7
- OCLC: 76961323

Blessed Unrest: How the Largest Movement in the World Came into Being and Why No One Saw It Coming is a 2007 New York Times bestseller by Paul Hawken. The book is about the many non-profit groups and community organizations, dedicated to many different causes, which Hawken calls the "environmental and social justice movement". Hawken explains that this is a diverse movement with no charismatic leader. The movement follows no unifying ideology, and is not recognized by politicians, the public and the media. But, Hawken argues, it has the potential to benefit the planet.

A New York Times reviewer states that Blessed Unrest is "about a movement that no one has noticed, not even the people involved". For this reviewer, the "high point of the book is Hawken's excellent critique of the chemical industry's attack on Rachel Carson's Silent Spring in 1962", at a time when she was fighting cancer. Hawken also tells the stories of other people who have endured hardship and difficulty as they stood up to large corporations.

== See also ==
- Environmental movement
- Leaderless resistance
- The Starfish and the Spider
- Unorganisation
- Wiser.org
