= Big Society Award =

The Big Society Award was a British award set up by prime minister David Cameron in November 2010 as part of the Big Society initiative. The awards recognised community work done in the UK that demonstrates the Big Society. Over fifty awards had been presented by the start of 2015. The awards had been discontinued by 2018.

The award was focussed on three areas:

- "outstanding contribution to community"
- "improving lives and society through innovation, collaboration and new partnerships"
- "engaging in social action"

== Recipients ==
- FoodCycle, January 2011, for creating "an opportunity for young people to volunteer and learn new skills while helping others in their community".
- The Old Vic Tunnels, February 2011, for "offering opportunities for young people to gain experience in production and be part of an innovative and diverse arts venue".
- Mitzvah Day, November 2011, for "inspiring people to come together on one day and do something positive for their community".
- Gateway 97.8 (a local community radio station in Basildon Essex), December 2011, for helping "students and unemployed people … gain valuable skills to gain employment" and providing "valuable support for local charities".
- Waitrose, January 2012, "for its Community Matters Scheme which… allows shoppers to choose three charitable causes each month to receive a £1,000 donation from their store".
- Social media surgery, February 2012, for having "shared their time and expertise to help so many local groups make the most of the internet".
- AFC Wimbledon (a community-owned and run social enterprise football club), March 2012, for having "united a community, given them the chance to have a real stake in their club’s future and made a huge difference to the lives of many people in the area".
- Street Angels, June 2012, for working "hand in hand with their local services to make their towns, estates and streets safer places".
- Hethersett village, March 2013, for working "to improve residents' fitness and wellbeing and local facilities to keep the Olympic legacy alive".
- City Gateway, July 2012, for working "to help local women and young people gain the skills needed to progress into work".
- London 2012 Games Makers, November 2012, recognised the huge contribution made by London 2012 volunteers, including more than 70,000 Games Makers and Host City volunteers, by presenting them with a Big Society Award. This is the 50th award given to individuals or groups who help to build a bigger, stronger society.
- The Lightbox, December 2012, for setting up and running a charity museum and gallery in Woking, Surrey.
- PATHS, June 2013, for supporting homeless services in Oxfordshire.
- Mosaic Network, July 2013, for "offering mentoring to young people in some of the most deprived areas of the country, while boosting and encouraging volunteering".
- Herne Hill Velodrome, August 2013, for working to save a 1948 Olympic cycle track.
- British Paraorchestra, September 2013, for "providing opportunities, challenging perceptions and entertaining audiences".
- Fair Finance, October 2013, for supporting "200 London businesses to access the finance they need to get started or grow".
- Everton in the Community, November 2013, "for activities about employment, education and health".
- UK Fire and Rescue Service, July 2014, "for its ground-breaking work with young people to educate about fire prevention and tackle anti-social behaviour."
- Spacehive, November 2014, "for helping local communities to fund neighbourhood improvement projects online."
- Body & Soul, December 2014, for their "work to support people living with HIV, their friends and their families".
- Creation Development Trust, December 2011, for their work "people working to help their own community deliver the improvements they want to see"
