= Robert Egger =

American activist

Robert Egger is an American nonprofit leader, author, speaker and activist in the culinary field.

Egger founded the DC Central Kitchen in 1989, a nationally recognized "community kitchen" that collects leftover food from hospitality businesses and farms, and uses it to fuel a culinary arts job training program and provide meals to local service agencies. He is also the founder of Campus Kitchens Project, CForward and the L.A. Kitchen, started in 2013.

== Career ==
During the 1980s, Egger managed nightclubs around Washington DC. Inspired by a volunteer experience feeding the needy, he founded the DC Central Kitchen in 1989, the country's first "community kitchen", where food donated by hospitality businesses and farms is used to fuel its nationally recognized culinary arts job training program. Since opening, the kitchen (which is a $12-million-a-year, self-sustaining social enterprise) has produced over 35 million meals and helped 1,500 men and women gain full-time employment. The Kitchen operates its own revenue-generating business, Fresh Start Catering, as well as the Campus Kitchens Project, which coordinates similar recycling/meal programs in over 57 colleges or high school kitchens. In addition, Egger founded CForward, an advocacy organization that promoted the economic role that nonprofits play in every community.

In 2002, Egger served as interim director of the United Way National Capital Area for a year to reorganize the organization's executive leadership after accusations of financial mismanagement.

In Washington DC, Robert was the founding chair of both the Mayor's Commission on Nutrition, and Street Sense, Washington's "homeless" newspaper. He was also the co-convener of the first Nonprofit Congress, held in Washington DC in 2006.

Egger stepped down from his position at DC Central Kitchen in January 2013 to launch L.A. Kitchen in Los Angeles, CA. Founded in 2013, L.A. Kitchen is a 20,000 sq. ft., two–level processing kitchen, located in NE Los Angeles. L.A. Kitchen operates Strong Food, a wholly owned, for-profit subsidiary that hires training program graduates and competes for food service contracts, with an emphasis on opportunities to serve healthy senior meals. L.A. Kitchen's founding partner is the AARP Foundation, which gave its first million dollar grant to help establish the model.

Egger also serves on the boards of the Los Angeles Food Policy Council, Kitchens for Good, #Hashtag Lunchbag, ROSIES Foundation, The Philanthropic Collaborative, and Chef Jose Andres' World Central Kitchen.

== Writing ==
Egger's book on the nonprofit sector, Begging for Change: The Dollars and Sense of Making Nonprofits Responsive, Efficient and Rewarding For All, was published in 2004 by HarperCollins. It received the 2005 Terry McAdam Book Award for "Best Nonprofit Management Book" by the Alliance for Nonprofit Management.

== Recognition and awards ==
L.A. Weekly named Robert one of their 2016 People of the Year, and in 2015, he was given the Conscious Leader of the Year award by Conscious Capitalism. He was included in The NonProfit Times' list of the "50 Most Powerful and Influential" nonprofit leaders from 2006 to 2009. He was the recipient of the Restaurant Association of Metropolitan Washington's 2007 "Lifetime Achievement" award and the 2004 James Beard Foundation "Humanitarian of the Year" award.

Egger has also been named an Oprah Angel, a Washingtonian of the Year, a Point of Light, a Food Hero by Food Tank, a REAL Food Innovator by the US Healthful Food Council, one of Oprah Magazine's "Real Sexiest Men Alive", and one of the Ten Most Caring People in America by the Caring Institute.

He is also a 15+ gallon blood donor to the American Red Cross.
