= Por Los Chicos =

Nonprofit organization for poor children

- Website type: Nonprofit organization
- Website: porloschicos.com
- Commercial: No
- Registration: Optional
- Launched: 2001; 25 years ago

Por Los Chicos (in English, For The Children) is a nonprofit organization that coordinates donations to children in poverty. The organization does not have any political or religious affiliation. Its mission is to fight children malnutrition in Argentina. As of 2020, it is bringing help to around 3500 children in more than 20 institutions.

== Structure ==
Por Los Chicos is composed by volunteers who work since 2001. As of 2020, the organization has around 700 volunteers. The main values of the organization are support to health, nutrition, education, art, and social and cultural inclusion. Donations can be done through a click-to-donate system provided at the website. Each sponsor donates money when its advertisement is seen by a user. Some sponsors also donate when their products are purchased. This money is used to buy food and distributed in meal centers.

Food is distributed using any of the following strategies:

- direct distribution: the sponsor takes care of purchasing and transporting food to the meal centers,
- wholesale purchase: Por Los Chicos makes wholesale purchases directly to the providers, according to the needs of the meal centers,
- distribution of supermarket vouchers: Por Los Chicos distributes supermarket vouchers to the meal centers and controls their use via invoices.

The provided food includes milk, cereals, dehydrated vegetables, legumes, and they are calcium fortified. Por Los Chicos is registered in the United States as a 501(c)(3) organization, which allows it to receive tax-deductible donations (in the United States) and participate in donation matching programs and in AmazonSmile.

== See also ==
- Food bank
- The Hunger Site
