= Camden Highline =

Proposed park and greenway in London, England

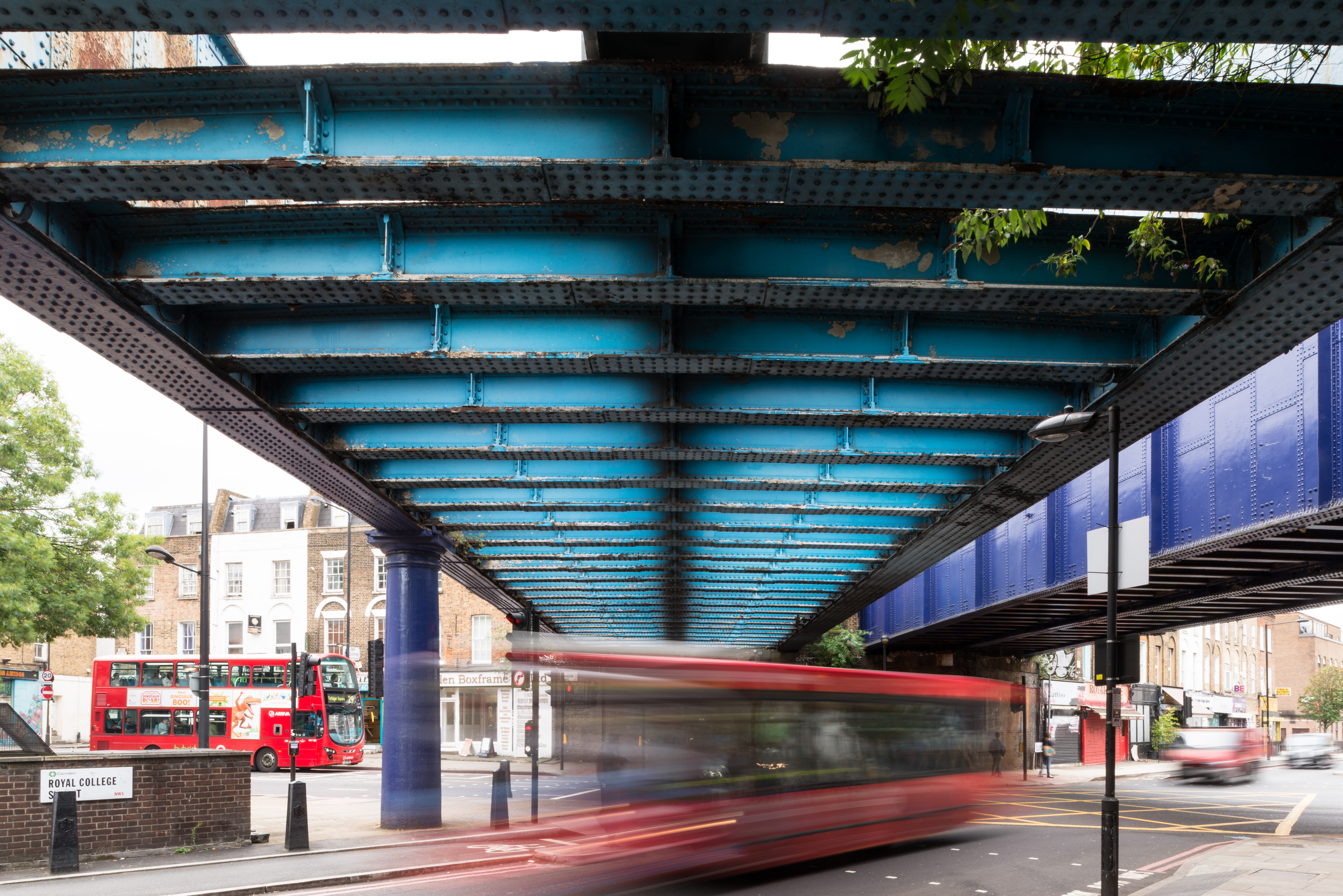
- Under a disused railway bridge at Camden Road
- Interactive map of Camden Highline
- Type: elevated urban linear park; public park
- Location: Camden Town, London, England
- Coordinates: 51.5418°N 0.1388°W
- Area: A linear 0.75-mile (1.21 km) stretch of converted train track
- Status: Scrapped
- Website: www.camdenhighline.com

The Camden Highline is an abandoned proposal to build an elevated public park and greenway from Camden Town to King's Cross alongside the North London line railway. The scheme was an idea first proposed in a 2015 blog post that was supported by local publication, Kentishtowner. The positive feedback from readers was shared with local stakeholders and promotion of the scheme was taken up by Camden Town Unlimited, the business improvement district for Camden Town. Camden Highline was set up as a charitable company to deliver the scheme. They agreed a lease of at least 15 years from Network Rail, on the understanding the land would return to railway use, but were unable to gain planning permission from Camden Council. The charity announced in May 2026 that the project was being paused indefinitely due to rising costs and fundraising issues.

== Background ==
The section of what is now the North London line was opened in 1850 by the East and West India Docks and Birmingham Junction Railway, with a new station at Camden Town opening at the same time on St Pancras Way. In 1853, the company became the North London Railway. The station was renamed Camden Road. On 1 July 1870, the name reverted to Camden Town and the station was resited further west in December of that year. The name was later changed again in 1950 to the present Camden Road.

In 1984, the third platform at the station was closed and the whole section from what is now the Camden Road West Junction to Camden Road East Junction was reduced from four to two tracks. As part of improvement works on the London Overground, it was intended to restore the four tracks through Camden Road station. However, the condition of the disused bridges made this unaffordable in 2008. In 2021, reinstating a third track and platform at Camden Road was identified by Network Rail as an option to increase railway capacity.

== Project ==
=== Proposal ===
The idea of an elevated green walkway was envisioned in a December 2015 blog post by Oliver O'Brien, a geographer at University College London. This received coverage in the Kentishtowner local publication in June 2016. Readers were encouraged to support advancing the project, and it was promised that feedback would be presented to relevant stakeholders. In November 2016, Kentishtowner said the project had received the support of readers. It was also supported by Simon Pitkeathley, the CEO of Camden Town Unlimited business improvement district. Camden Town Unlimited promoted the scheme with the first details announced in May 2017.

=== Design ===
In 2020, an international competition was held to find a design team and 76 bids were received. Entrants included Adjaye Associates, AL A, AHMM, Asif Khan, Coffey Architects, Cullinan Studio, CZWG, David Kohn, Grant Associates, Hawkins\Brown, Jamie Fobert Architects, LDA, Lifschutz Davidson Sandilands, Migrants Bureau, Weston Williamson, and Zaha Hadid Architects. International submissions were also lodged by BIG, Snøhetta, West 8 and Diller Scofidio + Renfro. The competition shortlist included the 2019 RIBA Stirling Prize contenders Feilden Fowles Architects; London-based Benedetti Architects; Southwark's We Made That with Hassell, Agence Ter of Paris; and US-based James Corner Field Operations, which led the team behind the High Line in New York City.

=== Planning ===
It was reported in January 2023 that the first phase of the scheme had received planning permission. However, an approving vote by the Camden Council planning committee on 19 January 2023 was subject to the completion of a Section 106 agreement that was not done. After the vote, issues with proposed works at Camden Gardens that conflicted with its designation as a protected square under the London Squares Preservation Act 1931 came to light. This required a new planning application that as of January 2026 had not been submitted and the scheme did not have planning permission.

=== Opposition ===
The scheme was opposed by Future Transport London, the former London branch of Campaign for Better Transport and Climate Emergency Camden. They argued that the project conflicts with increasing local rail use and that even if its reversal for that purpose is envisioned in a few decades time, the cost would present an obstacle; that it would have considerable embodied carbon and that upgrading the public towpath which already connects Camden Town and Kings Cross would be more cost-effective. The scheme was opposed by DB Cargo UK, GB Railfreight and Freightliner freight operators. In response, Network Rail said the land would only be leased and could be returned to railway use in 15 years.

=== Cancellation ===
In May 2026 it was announced that the project was being paused with immediate effect, owing to rising costs and reduced funding capacity. The chair of Camden Highline trustees stated that "the planning, creativity and imagination... will be carefully preserved by the trustees, so that whether it is us or others who one day pick up the mantle again, the project's achievements can be carried forward for the future".

== Governance ==
Camden Highline is registered as a company (number 11205376) since 14 February 2018 and a charity (number 1191150) since 4 September 2020. Trustees include Simon Pitkeathley and Catherine Horwood.

=== Fundraising ===
In 2017, a crowdfunding campaign received 314 donations, raising £64,000 using the Spacehive platform. This included £20,000 from Camden Unlimited and £2,500 from Sadiq Khan, the mayor of London. In 2019, £20,000 was secured from the UK Government to make improvements to Camden Gardens. In 2020, £400,000 of Section 106 money intended for improvements to London Buses route 214 was diverted to the project. The scheme was awarded £136,749 by the National Lottery Heritage Fund in 2023. The project started fundraising the construction costs in August 2019. As of January 2024, funding was still being sought.
