= Paul Hawken =

American environmentalist and economist (born 1946)

- Hawken in 2018
- Born: February 8, 1946 (age 80); San Mateo, California, U.S.
- Occupations: Author, entrepreneur, activist
- Spouse: Jasmine Scalesciani Hawken
- Writing career
- Genre: Ecological business
- Website: paulhawken.com

Paul Gerard Hawken (born February 8, 1946) is an American environmentalist, entrepreneur, author, economist, and activist. Hawken is the co-founder of Project Drawdown, a non-profit that describes how global warming can be reversed. He served as Drawdown's executive director from 2014 until 2017 and is credited as the primary author on their eponymous book project.

== Biography ==
Hawken was born in San Mateo, California, and grew up in the San Francisco Bay Area, where his father worked at UC Berkeley in library sciences. He attended UC Berkeley and San Francisco State University. Hawken's work includes founding ecological businesses, writing about impacts of commerce on living systems, and consulting with corporations and governments on economic development, industrial ecology, and environmental policy. Hawken was active in the civil rights movement. He currently lives in the San Francisco Bay Area.

== Career ==
=== Writing ===
Hawken has authored articles, op-eds, peer-reviewed papers, and seven books, including: The Next Economy (Ballantine 1983), Growing a Business (Simon and Schuster 1987), The Ecology of Commerce (HarperCollins 1993), and Blessed Unrest (Viking 2007).

The Ecology of Commerce was voted the #1 college text on business and the environment by professors in 67 business schools. The businessman and environmentalist Ray Anderson of Interface, Inc. credited The Ecology of Commerce with his environmental awakening. He described reading it as a "spear in the chest experience", after which Anderson started travelling across the U.S. to tell fellow executives about the need to reduce waste and carbon emissions.

Natural Capitalism: Creating the Next Industrial Revolution, co-authored with Amory Lovins and published in 1999, wrote about the idea of natural capital and direct accounting for ecosystem services. Natural Capitalism has been translated into 14 other languages. Together with The Ecology of Commerce these books have been described as being "among the first to point the way towards a sustainable global economy".

Blessed Unrest, How the Largest Movement in the World Came into Being and Why No One Saw It Coming, published in 2007, argues that a vast "movement with no name" is forming involving environmental, social justice, and indigenous rights organizations. Hawken conceives of this "movement" as developing not by ideology but rather through the identification of what is and is not humane, and has compared it to humanity's collective immune system.

Growing a Business became the basis of a 17-part PBS series, which Hawken hosted and produced. The program, which explored the challenges and pitfalls of starting and operating socially responsible companies, appeared on television in 115 countries and reached more than 100 million people.

Hawken co-created Project Drawdown in 2013 with Amanda Joy Ravenhill, and was the co-creator, author, and editor of Drawdown: The Most Comprehensive Plan Ever Proposed to Reverse Global Warming, published in 2017. It was a collaborative effort involving 200 researchers and advisors who came together to model the most substantive solutions to reverse global warming.

In 2021, Hawken published Regeneration: Ending the Climate Crisis in One Generation; the book became a New York Times Bestseller.

Hawken's books have been published in more than 50 countries and in 30 languages.

=== Business ===
Hawken founded several companies, starting when he took over a small retail store in Boston in 1967 called Erewhon (after Samuel Butler's 1872 utopian novel) and turned it into the Erewhon Trading Company, a natural-foods wholesaler and one of the first in the U.S. that relied solely on sustainable agricultural methods. When he left the company in the 1970s, it had over 30,000 acres of organically grown food under contract. Hawken co-founded the Smith & Hawken garden supply company in 1979, a retail and catalog business. In 2009, he founded OneSun, an energy company focused on ultra low-cost solar energy based on green chemistry and biomimicry.

From 1994 to 1998, Hawken founded and led The Natural Step USA. From 1996 to 1998, Hawken was co-chairman of The Natural Step International. The Natural Step was founded in 1989 by Swedish scientist and medical doctor Karl-Henrik Robèrt in order to create shared frameworks for understanding sustainable development. Its purpose is to teach and support environmental systems thinking in corporations, cities, governments, unions, and academic institutions through a dialogue process rooted in basic science.

In 1998, Hawken created the Natural Capital Institute located in Sausalito, California. Its main focus was wiser.org, an open-source database of activists and civil society organizations focused on environmental and social justice.

Hawken was previously the executive director of Project Drawdown, which is working towards the drawdown of greenhouse gases to reduce climate change.

=== Activism ===
In 1965, Hawken worked with Martin Luther King Jr.'s staff in Selma, Alabama, preparing for the Selma to Montgomery marches. As press coordinator, he registered members of the press, issued credentials, gave dozens of updates and interviews on national radio, and acted as marshal for the March to Montgomery on March 21. That same year, Hawken worked in New Orleans as a staff photographer for the Congress of Racial Equality, focusing on voter registration drives in Bogalusa, Louisiana, and the panhandle of Florida, and photographing the Ku Klux Klan in Meridian, Mississippi, after three civil rights workers were tortured and killed. In Meridian, Hawken was assaulted and seized by Ku Klux Klan members, but escaped due to Federal Bureau of Investigation surveillance and intervention.

=== Speaking ===
As a speaker, Hawken has given several hundred talks, including keynote addresses to major associations, companies, government agencies. His University commencement addresses have included:

- University of California, Berkeley commencement
- University of Portland 2009 commencement speech ("You Are Brilliant and the Earth Is Hiring")
- Urban Land Institute
- Yale University and Yale University commencement

== Awards ==
Hawken has been awarded six honorary doctorates, and received the Green Cross Millennium Award for Individual Environmental Leadership presented by Mikhail Gorbachev in 2003.

== Bibliography ==
- The Magic of Findhorn (1975), illustrated by Wayne Anderson, published by Fontana
- Seven Tomorrows (1980, Co-authored with Peter Schwartz and James Ogilvy)
- The Next Economy (1983)
- Growing a Business (1987)
- The Ecology of Commerce: A Declaration of Sustainability (1993)
- Natural Capitalism: Creating the Next Industrial Revolution (1999, Co-authored with Amory Lovins and L. Hunter Lovins)
- Blessed Unrest: How the Largest Social Movement in History Is Restoring Grace, Justice, and Beauty to the World (2007)
- Drawdown: The Most Comprehensive Plan Ever Proposed to Reverse Global Warming / edited by Paul Hawken (2017)
- Regeneration: Ending the Climate Crisis in One Generation (2021)
- Carbon: The Book of Life (2025)

== See also ==
- List of economists
- Green growth
