= Wiser.org =

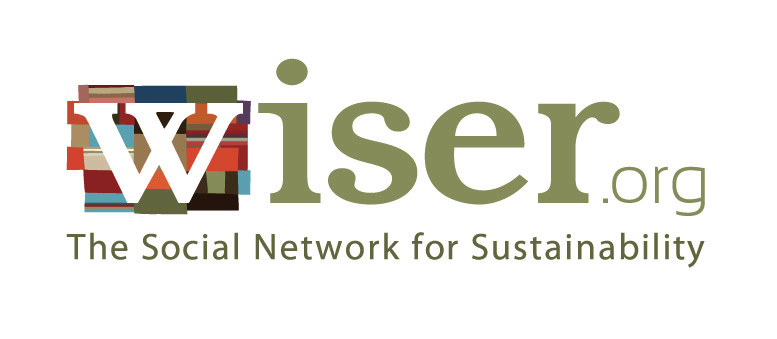
- Wiser.org logo
- Founded: 2007
- Dissolved: 2014
- Current status: Defunct

Wiser.org, formerly WiserEarth.org, was a user-generated online community space for the social and environmental movement. As one of the social networks for environmental sustainability and social change, Wiser.org was the primary initiative of the non-profit organization WiserEarth, which tracks the work of non-profits around the world. The site mapped and connected non-governmental organizations (NGOs), businesses, governments, groups, and individuals addressing global issues such as climate change, poverty, the environment, peace, water, hunger, social justice, conservation, human rights, and more.

On 17 March 2014, it was announced on the Wiser.org website that it would be archived and shut down on 10 April 2014.

== History ==
Wiser.org was launched as WiserEarth.org on 22 April 2007, Earth Day, as an online directory of the 100,000+ organizations discussed in Paul Hawken's book, Blessed Unrest. Hawken had amassed a collection of business cards from thousands of organizations over the years, but had not found a comprehensive directory listing all non-profit organizations involved in the social justice and environmental sector. Estimating the total number of non-profit organizations around the world to be well over a million, Hawken launched the World Index for Social and Environmental Responsibility (Wiser.org), as an online directory to help map out the work done by these organizations. Wiser.org incorporated additional social networking features, such as status updates, likes, walls, groups, and email messaging. Wiser.org expanded its organization directory to include listings of for-profit businesses and government agencies.

As of September 15, 2012, Wiser.org provided a directory of more than 114,000 organizations worldwide, over 71,900 registered members, and more than 2,800 groups. It featured resources and information on various social issues, organized into 47 issue areas and 381 sub-issue areas.

On 6 January 2014, Wiser.org's Executive Director, Peggy Duvette wrote an open letter to all members (which she updated on 24 January 2014) explaining the need for changes and the possibility of archiving the Wiser.org website to the Wayback Machine; and on 17 March 2014 she officially announced that the closure and archiving of the Wiser.org website would occur on 10 April 2014.

In 2017, the domain WISER.org became the website for the Workie Institute for Social and Educational Research, a non-profit focusing on social exclusion, including bullying and systematic barriers to society, based on the work of the late Dr. Abaineh Workie.

== See also ==
- Blessed Unrest
- Care2
- Paul Hawken
- Earth Charter
