= Rebuildingsociety.com =

Leeds-based peer-to-peer lending platform

- Company type: Limited
- Founded: United Kingdom (2011)
- Founder: Daniel Rajkumar
- Headquarters: Leeds, England, UK
- Key people: Matthew Doyle, Michael Lawther
- Products: Peer-to-peer lending
- Website: www.rebuildingsociety.com

Rebuildingsociety.com is a Leeds-based peer-to-peer lending platform, founded in 2012 by Daniel Rajkumar, to facilitate the online arranging of finance between lenders and small and medium-sized enterprises. The first loans were completed in February 2013.

== Operation ==
The Rebuildingsociety.com website operates as a lending platform by allowing approved businesses to publish a loan application. Investors can subscribe to parts of the loan after assessing the business's information, committing an amount of their choice, with an interest rate of their choice.

The website was one of the early peer-to-peer lending platforms to have launched in the UK prior to the regulation of the industry. Research by the website in late 2013 found SME owners were still largely unaware of peer-to-business lending and rely on personal borrowing to support their businesses.

== Potential returns ==
Returns can vary considerably due to multiple factors.

As of 12 January 2014, the average interest rate payable to lenders from 25 loans completed was 15.57% gross. Earnings are reduced by any defaults which are forecast to be up to 7% depending on the risk appetite of the lender.

== Regulation ==
The Financial Conduct Authority undertook to regulate the peer-to-peer lending industry from April 2014.

As of 22 February 2017, Rebuilding Society transitioned from interim permission to full FCA authorisation, with the following permissions:

- Operating an electronic system in relation to lending;
- Client money.

As of 14 April 2026, rebuildingsociety.com obtained Section 21 Permissions to approve financial promotions for:

- Crypto assets

== Pensions and ISAs ==
In 2014, the UK government announced it was considering setting up a separate type of tax-free individual savings account (ISA) for people who want to lend out money. The new ISA would be for people who lend money via peer-to-peer borrowing sites.

Rebuildingsociety.com opened IFISA (innovative finance ISA) pre-registrations in March 2017.

In January 2015, Rebuildingsociety.com announced a new partnership with SIPPclub, which was intended to allow qualifying investors to invest through a specially designed self-invested personal pension (SIPP). The platform’s investors were to be able to invest via an EvolutionSIPP.

== Growth and maturity ==
The company said in 2013 that one in four savers was ready to invest.

Non-bank lending grew at its fastest rate since 2008 in the year to October 2013, with over £10.5bn of credit arranged through peer-to-peer lending, invoice discounting, asset finance and leasing. Rebuildingsociety.com passed the £1m of lending mark in October 2013

As of 14 August 2014, total advances stood at around £3.5m, while in January 2015 it passed £5m of loans completed. In August 2016, total lending surpassed £10.4m,

== Council Partnerships ==
In February 2018, the firm began a partnership with its Leeds City Council to provide funding to other Leeds based businesses.

== Awards and Commendations ==
Rebuildingsociety.com achieved the following awards:

- In November 2019, the website received a five-star rating in the first "Loan Based Crowdfunding" analysis by financial sector analyst Defaqto.
- CEO, Daniel Rajkumar is named in the Peer-to-Peer Finance News Power 50.

== Technology ==
Their website offered a licensed version of its technology to other businesses looking to break into the peer-to-peer lending industry through White Label Crowdfunding. In August 2013, it announced its first three clients.
