= Spacehive =

UK-based crowdfunding platform

- Website type: Crowdfunding (Social business)
- Headquarters: London, United Kingdom
- Founder: Chris Gourlay
- Website: www.spacehive.com
- Launched: February 1, 2012; 14 years ago

Spacehive is a United Kingdom-based crowdfunding platform for projects aimed at improving local civic and community spaces.

== Overview ==
According to the company's website, Spacehive's mission is to "empower people to make their local area better". As of October 2018, Spacehive has been used to crowdfund 500 projects worth over £10 million including the Camden Highline, a giant water slide down a high street in Bristol, the revival of Peckham Lido in London, and a community centre in the deprived ex-mining town of Glyncoch, Wales.

Spacehive was launched in 2012 by Chris Gourlay, a former Sunday Times journalist who specialised in architecture and planning stories.

Supported by the Big Lottery Fund and a mix of private and social investors, the social business maximises sources of funding for projects by allowing cash raised locally to be combined with grant funding streams available for civic projects from government, foundations and businesses. Backers of projects are only charged if the funding target is reached.

Project creators can apply for grants via the platform at the same time as crowdfunding. They can also request in-kind contributions towards the cost of the project.

Each project is verified by partner organisation Locality to ensure its viability before it starts funding. According to the company, the average success rate for fundraising campaigns on Spacehive is 52%, whilst projects that secure just 10% of their funding target have a 79% success rate.

In addition to its service for project creators, Spacehive provides specialised software and support services to help councils, companies, and foundations that it partners with to fund projects alongside the crowd and to measure their social impact. Spacehive's partners include the Mayor of London, Manchester City Council, Esmee Fairbairn Foundation, GLL, and Veolia. Spacehive projects have attracted significant press coverage in the UK and internationally. Notable supporters of Spacehive projects include the actress Joanna Lumley, broadcaster Kevin McCloud, the comedian Stephen Fry, the actor James Norton, and the Mayor of London, Sadiq Khan

== Awards ==
- Global Urban Innovator, 2016 - New Cities Foundation
- Big Society Award - 10 Downing Street
- Winner, Big Venture Challenge - UnLtd
- Top 50, New Radicals 2014 - Nesta
