= Crowdsourcing Week =

Crowdsourcing Week is a global platform committed to helping organizations, innovators and entrepreneurs transition into a more open, connected, and socially productive society enabled by the Internet and online tools powered by the crowds. The company highlights the importance of people-powered or crowd economy practices such as crowdsourcing, crowdfunding, collaborative consumption, sharing economy, and open innovation and among others through global conferences, summits and advisory services, CSW2.

== Past Events ==
- CSW Summit Warsaw with MillionYou (2013)
- CSW Summit Amsterdam with Douw Koren (2013)
- CSW Summit Berlin with Ikosom (2013)
- CSW Global Conference with Microsoft (2013)
- CSW Summit London with KPMG (2013)
- CSW Global Conference with StarHub (2014)
- CSW Summit Brussels with BNP Paribas Fortis (2014)
- CSW Summit Warsaw with MillionYou (2014)
- CSW European Conference with StarHub (2014)
- CSW Summit Jakarta with StartupLokal (2015)
- CSW Summit Venice with H-Farm Ventures (2015)
- CSW Summit Arctic Circle with Lapland Vuollerim (2015)
- CSW Summit Manila with Spark Project (2015)
- CSW Global Conference with SECB (2015)
- CSW Summit Geneva with Catalyx (2015)
- CSW Summit Gjakova (2015)
- CSW Europe Brussels (2015)
- CSW Global London (2016)
- CSW Summit Tehran (2016)
- CSW Summit Johannesburg (2016)
- CSW Summit Bangalore (2016)
- CSW Europe Brussels (2016)
- CSW Arctic Circle Luleå, Sweden (2017)
- CSW Summit Washington D.C. (2017)
- CSW Summit Seattle (2017)
- CSW Arctic Europe Luleå, Sweden (2018)
- CSW Global Washington D.C. (2018)
- CSW Summit CommunicAsia Singapore (2019)
- CSW Global San Francisco (2019)
- CSW Riyadh, Saudi Arabia (2019)

During and since the Covid pandemic, Crowdsourcing Week's events shifted online.
