= Ioby =

American crowdfunding platform

Ioby (stylized as ioby, an acronym for "in our backyards") was a US-based civic crowdfunding platform operated by a non-profit 501(c)(3) organization; it was incorporated in 2007 and launched in beta in April 2009.

Ioby announced its closure in 2024.
