= Upper Chattahoochee Riverkeeper =

Chattahoochee Riverkeeper (CRK)
- Formation: 1994
- Headquarters: Atlanta, Georgia
- Members: 10,000
- Riverkeeper: Jason Ulseth
- Executive Director: Juliet Cohen
- Website: chattahoochee.org

Chattahoochee Riverkeeper (CRK) -- formerly known as Upper Chattahoochee Riverkeeper (UCR) -- is a United States environmental advocacy organization with 10,000 members dedicated solely to protecting and restoring the Chattahoochee River Basin. CRK was modeled after New York’s Hudson Riverkeeper and was the 11th licensed program in the international Waterkeeper Alliance. In 2012, the organization officially changed its name to simply Chattahoochee Riverkeeper (CRK), dropping the "Upper" to better reflect its stewardship over the entire river basin.

CRK’s primary geographic focus begins at the river's headwaters in the north Georgia mountains above Helen and continues downstream to West Point Lake, encompassing more than 200 miles (320 km) of the Chattahoochee River and 3,600 square miles (9,300 km^{2}) of watershed. The Chattahoochee River meets the Flint River above Lake Seminole to become the Apalachicola River in Florida. CRK is best known for its legal action against the City of Atlanta which resulted in the city revitalizing their infrastructure to address a major sewage problem, thus ensuring a cleaner river for the community.

CRK "actively uses advocacy, education, research, communication, cooperation, monitoring and legal actions to protect and preserve the Chattahoochee and its watershed."

== History ==
Upper Chattahoochee Riverkeeper was founded in 1994 by Laura Turner Seydel and Rutherford Seydel. Modeling the Chattahoochee program after New York's aggressive and successful Hudson Riverkeeper, they sought to create a focused environmental advocacy initiative led by professional staff and committed volunteers. With funding from the Turner Foundation and other local supporters, UCR officially opened its doors for business on March 1, 1994.

Since 1994, a dedicated and diverse board of directors has guided the organization in its transformation from a scrappy group of paddlers, scientists, anglers and environmental activists to a respected organization that has won many victories for the Chattahoochee River Basin. Since its founding, Sally Bethea has served as Executive Director and Riverkeeper. The group changed its name to Chattahoochee Riverkeeper in 2012.

After 20 years of running the organization, Sally Bethea retired at the end of 2014. The organization had grown substantially since its founding, and, as a result, CRK divided Bethea’s role into two separate positions: riverkeeper and executive director. The role of riverkeeper was filled by longtime staff member Jason Ulseth, and CRK’s general counsel, Juliet Cohen, became the new executive director.

In 2015, the non-profit won a $10 million Clean Water Act settlement: one of the largest in Georgia's history. A U.S. District Court Judge ordered American Seal Coat LLC. to pay for damages inflicted when the manufacturer dumped pollutants into a tributary of the Chattahoochee in violation of permits.

== Current work ==
Chattahoochee Riverkeeper actively works to protect and preserve the Chattahoochee watershed through legal work, policy work, technical programs, communication, education, and recreational activities.

=== Legal Work ===
Legal work includes working with legislators to strengthen regulatory protections for waterways, lobbying to protect water resources, and pursuing legal action when necessary to ensure that the laws that protect drinking water supply are properly enforced. In 2015 the organization won a $10 million dollar settlement against a polluting business for violations of the Clean Water Act. CRK also "reviews Environmental Protection Division files and Discharge Monitoring Reports for problem facilities, and when identified, will develop strategies for compliance."

=== Policy Work ===
In policy, CRK promotes water conservation and advocates for water efficiency measures, protection of our water supply at all levels of government, and effective and wise water planning for the watershed region. With regard to ongoing Tri-State issues, CRK addresses the conflict over water sharing and offers practical sustainable solutions.

=== Technical Programs ===
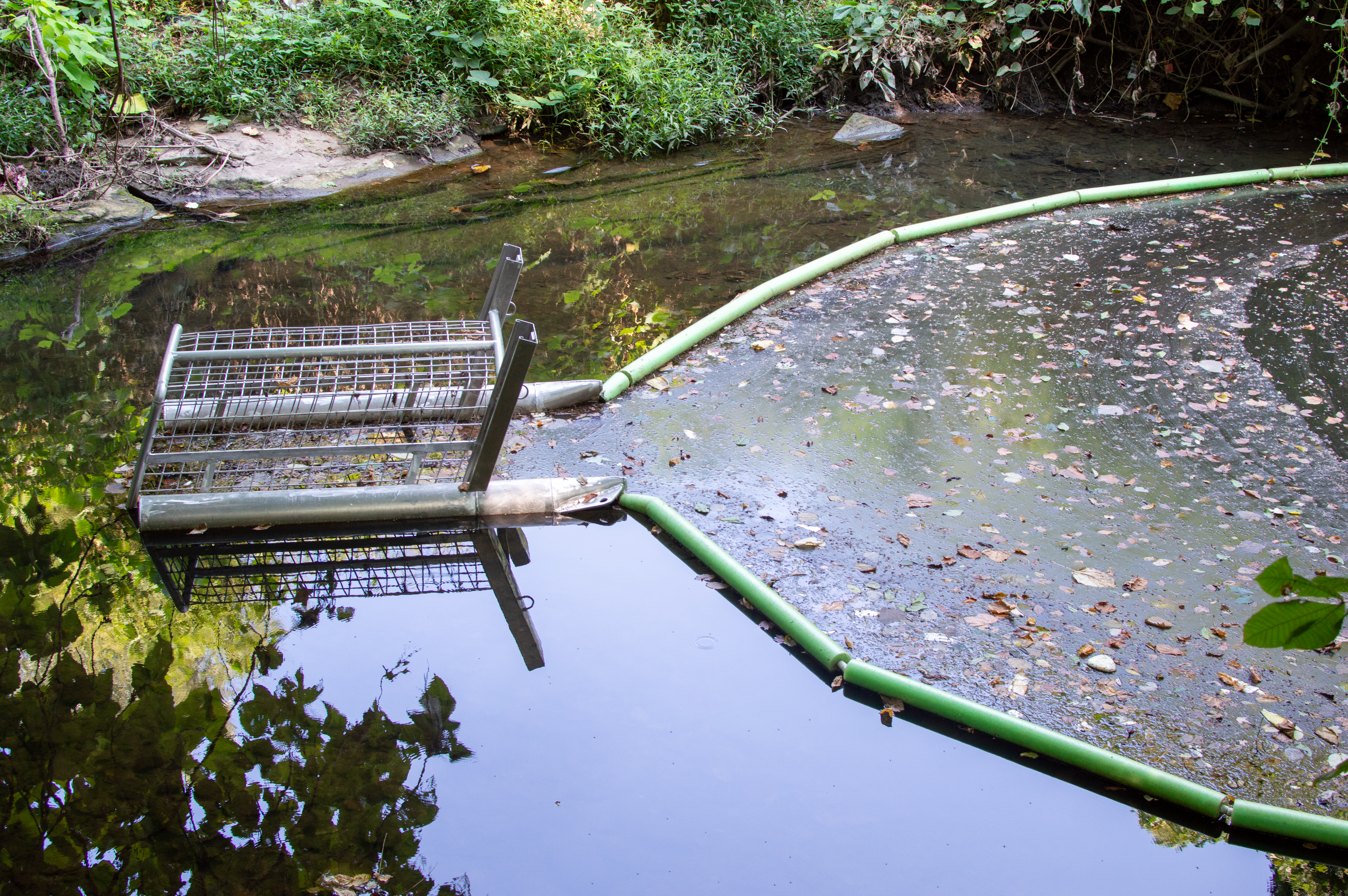
In-stream litter collection system

The technical programs include patrolling the watershed’s rivers and lakes, responding to citizen hotline calls and other reported problems, and monitoring water quality. CRK's Neighborhood Water Watch program works to assess and improve urban water quality for communities around the Chattahoochee. Community groups, citizens, and students gather water samples from local tributaries and deliver them to CRK conductivity, turbidity, and E. coli testing.

=== Education ===
Newsletters, sent two times a year, and bi-weekly electronic news flashes keep citizens in the loop on water issues and events. Education and training includes teaching children, citizens, business people, and policy-makers how to protect the Chattahoochee. CRK educates thousands of children each year onboard floating classrooms on Lake Lanier and West Point Lake to learn about water quality and river stewardship.

=== Recreation ===
Recreational activities promote responsible appreciation of the Chattahoochee through kayak and canoe trips, river races, and other activities.

== Locations ==
Additional offices in Gainesville and LaGrange provide education, enforcement and partnership to citizens and groups in the headwaters and the southern regions of the Upper Chattahoochee area.

== See also ==
- Chattahoochee River National Recreation Area
- Waterkeeper Alliance
- List of Alabama rivers
- List of Florida rivers
- List of Georgia rivers
- List of environmental and conservation organizations in the United States
