= Food Recovery Network =

U.S. nonprofit organization

- Founded: University of Maryland, College Park, 2011
- Headquarters: Washington, D.C.
- Website: https://www.foodrecoverynetwork.org/

Food Recovery Network (FRN) is a national nonprofit that mobilizes 8,000 college students, food providers, and local businesses in the fight against climate change and hunger by recovering perishable food across the supply chain that would otherwise go to waste and donating it to organizations that feed people experiencing hunger. As one of the largest student-driven movements against food waste and hunger, FRN’s programs are on over 200 college campuses and 100 food businesses in 46 states and D.C., and they have recovered more than 24 million pounds of food to date – the equivalent of 20 million meals donated to feed individuals experiencing hunger and 8135.13 metric tons of CO_{2} emissions prevented from entering our atmosphere.

== Background ==
In 2011, a group of students at the University of Maryland, College Park decided there was something they could do to fight the food waste on their campus. They reached out to the dining manager, Coleen Wright-Riva, who agreed to donate the surplus, edible food that would have otherwise been thrown away. They also contacted a local church that provided a meal service to community members free of charge. A few times a week, students safely packaged surplus food from their dining hall and transported it a few miles away to their community partner agency, who in turn passed it along to community members in need.

In the next year, this model of student-powered food recovery spread to additional schools in Rhode Island, California, Michigan, Texas, and more. By 2013, with recovery programs starting all over the U.S.A, the founding members had established FRN as a 501c3 nonprofit organization with full-time staff dedicated to expanding the network. A decade after the first recovery, FRN has recovered more than 5 million pounds of food.

FRN’s mission is built on the foundation of thousands of students across the country, who come from diverse backgrounds and academic fields, finding common cause in their belief that good food should not go to waste. The work of student leaders is bolstered by the Bill Emerson Good Samaritan Act of 1996. This law provides federal liability protection to businesses that donate food in good faith, meaning they do so without gross negligence of food safety.

Regina Harmon has been the Executive Director of Food Recovery Network since 2015. She has been invited to share her insights with media outlets such as CNN and Al Jazeera and was named one of the most influential leaders in the food industry by SELF magazine. In addition to her role at Food Recovery Network, Regina serves on the board of directors for Food Tank and Earth Island Institute and is a valued member of ReFED’s Advisory Council.
