= Adult Learners' Week =

UNESCO annual observation

Adult Learners' Week is an international festival of adult learning. It is a UNESCO initiative that was first celebrated in the United States in the late ’80s, where there was a move to create a broad celebration of adult learning by the American Association for the Advancement of Education (AAAE).

In 1990, governments met in Jomtien for the Education for All World conference. The aim of this conference was to set goals for universal access to and completion of primary education and to reduce the adult illiteracy rate to one half its 1990 level by 2000.

Today Adult Learners’ Week is celebrated in many countries across the globe. It is a grass roots campaign led by the community education sector.

== Adult Learners' Week in the UK ==
In the United Kingdom, the National Institute of Adult and Continuing Education first coordinated Adult Learners’ Week in 1992.

Today Adult Learners’ Week is the UK’s largest festival of learning, and the overall purpose of the initiative is to raise demand for learning and skills. It highlights the benefits of learning of all kinds, learning for work, informal learning as well as learning for personal development. 14 to 20 May 2011 marked the twentieth Adult Learners’ Week in England.

Adult Learners' Week in the UK is now known as the Festival of Learning

The initiative is supported by the European Social Fund, Department for Business, Innovation and Skills, Next Step, BBC, Open University and Pearson PLC.

== Adult Learners' Week in Australia ==
Adult Learners' Week is supported in Australia by the Commonwealth Department of Employment and Workplace Relations (DEWR) and coordinated by Adult Learning Australia.

Adult Learners' Week runs from 1–8 September and incorporates International Literacy Day, which is celebrated annually on September 8.

‘[T]he origins of Adult Learners’ Week in Australia can be directly traced to the UK experience’.

In 1995, Adult Learning Australia (then the Australian Association of Adult Education) received a grant to conduct a national pilot of Adult Learners’ Week. Government funding was then made available, and has continued for the national coordination of Adult Learners’ Week.

For 29 years, Adult Learners’ Week has been supported by successive Australian governments for a variety of reasons but largely because it attracts adults with some or all of the following characteristics:

- Adults who are not engaged in formal or non-formal learning activities either in the workplace or in the community.
- Adults who have had negative past experiences of formal education.
- Adults with low levels of literacy and numeracy.
- Adults who have an ambivalence about returning to learning.
- Adults who lack of an understanding of the learning options available to them.

In Australia, adult and community education providers support Adult Learners’ Week. Adult and community education (ACE) is recognised for reaching adults with low skills who may experience barriers to participation in formal learning settings. The ACE sector offers disadvantaged and disengaged learners points of access to vocational education and training, and work particularly for people who have struggled to complete mainstream schooling or for whom English is not their first language. ACE organisations are also major providers of foundation skills programs and adult literacy support.

Adult Learners Week will celebrate 30 years in Australia in 2025.
