= Bill Emerson Good Samaritan Act of 1996 =

Act encouraging food donation to US nonprofits

Bill Emerson Good Samaritan Food Donation Act
- Long title: An act to encourage the donation of food and grocery products to nonprofit organizations for distribution to needy individuals by giving the Model Good Samaritan Food Donation Act the full force and effect of law.

Citations
- Public law: Pub. L. 104–210 (text) (PDF)
- Statutes at Large: 110 Stat. 3011

Legislative history
- Passed the House on July 12, 1996; Passed the Senate on August 2, 1996 with amendment; House agreed to Senate amendment on September 5, 1996 (); Signed into law by President Bill Clinton on October 1, 1996

The Bill Emerson Good Samaritan Food Donation Act of 1996 is a United States federal Law enacted on October 1st, 1996. The act limits liability for food donors who donate expired or unknowingly unsafe food to food banks.

== History of the law ==
The Bill Emerson Good Samaritan Food Donation Act was first introduced in 1996. It was spearheaded by member of congress, Bill Emerson, who died before the act passed. The law was named after him to recognize his work. It passed the House on July 12th, 1996 and the Senate on August 2nd, 1996, who proposed an amendment the House agreed to on September 5th, 1996. The act was signed into law by President Bill Clinton on October 1st, 1996.

== Description of the law ==
The law provides limited liability for individual, corporation, partnership, organization, association, or governmental entities which donate food to non-profits that feed the hungry. In other words, this law ensures that entities that donate food cannot be sued for proving expired or otherwise unfit to consume food to the hungry. The law does not in cases of intentional misconduct or gross negligence, defined as "voluntary and conscious conduct by a person with knowledge (at the time of the conduct) that the conduct is likely to be harmful to the health or well-being of another person."

== Expansions to the law ==
The Federal Food Donation Act of 2008 built on the Bill Emerson Good Samaritan Food Donation Act by encouraging federal agencies to donate excess food to nonprofit organizations, utilizing the exemption for civil and criminal liability provided for in the 1996 law. Federal contracts for the purchase of food valued at over $25,000 must make provision for contractors to donate apparently wholesome excess food to nonprofit organizations.

== See also ==
- Child Nutrition Act
- Good Samaritan law
