= Interface, Inc. =

Manufacturer of commercial flooring

- Type: Public
- Traded as: Nasdaq: TILE; S&P 600 component
- Industry: Textile industry
- Founded: 1973; 53 years ago, in LaGrange, Georgia, U.S.
- Founder: Ray C. Anderson
- Headquarters: Atlanta, Georgia, U.S.
- Area served: Americas, Europe, Asia-Pacific
- Key people: Laurel Hurd (CEO)
- Products: Modular carpet tile; Luxury vinyl tile (LVT); nora rubber flooring
- Revenue: US$ 1.39 billion (2025)
- Operating income: US$ 164 million (2025)
- Net income: US$ 116.1 million (2025)
- Total assets: US$ 1.2 billion (2025)
- Total equity: US$ 641 million (2025)
- Number of employees: 3,570 (2025)
- Subsidiaries: FLOR, nora
- Website: interface.com

Interface, Inc., headquartered in Atlanta, Georgia, is a global manufacturer of commercial flooring. The company sells modular carpet tiles, luxury vinyl tile, and Nora brand rubber flooring.

== History ==
Interface was founded in 1973 by Ray Anderson to create carpet tiles, also known as modular carpet or carpet squares. Carpet tiles, which originated in Europe, became highly popular during the 1980s as an alternative to broadloom carpet, especially in office environments that at the time were switching to flexible, “open” plans that required easy access to wiring and infrastructure beneath floors. Interface grew to become the largest carpet-tile maker on the planet.

Starting in 1994, Interface focused on environmental sustainability, especially in reducing the use of petroleum. At this time, the company announced a program called Mission Zero with a goal of eliminating any negative impact the company may have on the environment by 2020. Since 1996, Interface chose to adopt an innovation-based green strategy. In a short period, it managed to reduce its impact on the environment by one third. Each year, the company releases its annual Impact Report, demonstrating the company’s environmental impact and progress.

In 2016, Interface announced its new mission, Climate Take Back, which aimed to reverse global warming. In 2018, Interface announced that all of its products, including all carpet tile and luxury vinyl tile (LVT), are carbon neutral across the entire product lifecycle through its Carbon Neutral Floors program. In 2019, 90% of Interface’s energy came from renewables.

Interface was recognized as Recyclers of the Year by the Carpet America Recovery Effort (CARE). In 2006 and 2016, Interface was voted number one in Globescan's survey of environmentally sustainable businesses. The company also received The Queen's Award for Enterprise: Sustainable Development (Environmental Achievement) (2008).

In 2019, Interface reported that it had achieved its Mission Zero goals ahead of its original 2020 target, significantly reducing greenhouse gas emissions, waste, water usage, and reliance on virgin raw materials across its operations.

In 2020, Interface launched its Embodied Beauty carpet tile collection, including three styles that the company described as carbon negative on a cradle-to-gate basis, covering raw material extraction and manufacturing. Interface established science-based targets in 2021 to reduce greenhouse gas emissions in line with international climate goals. The company continued to expand its use of carbon-storing materials, including the incorporation of captured carbon and bio-based materials into its flooring products throughout the early 2020s.

Following its acquisition of nora Systems, Interface expanded innovation within its nora rubber flooring portfolio. In 2025, the company introduced a prototype carbon negative rubber flooring product, extending its carbon negative design approach beyond carpet tile into resilient flooring.

In 2024, the company announced its ambition to become a carbon negative enterprise by 2040, aiming to store more carbon than it emits across its value chain. Under the strategy, Interface discontinued the use of carbon offsets for product carbon-neutrality claims and redirected that spending toward reducing emissions and storing carbon in materials. Its 2040 target includes emissions associated with the use and disposal of its flooring.

In September 2025, Interface reported that it had collected more than 80 million pounds of post-consumer carpet since 2016, with nearly 70% reused or recycled into its production processes. Its head of global sustainability strategy, Liz Minné, said that the collected volume remained small relative to total production and identified difficulties tracking flooring after sale as an obstacle to recovery.

== Awards ==
In 2020, Interface was named a UN Global Climate Action Award Winner in the Climate Neutral Now Category. It was named one of TIME’s Most Influential Companies in 2023. Interface was named a Reuters Sustainability Awards winner in 2024 for its ‘all in’ climate strategy.

== Timeline ==
- 1973: Ray Anderson creates Carpets International.
- 1974: Carpets International introduces GlasBac, a patented structured backing system that has become the industry standard for high-performance modular backings.
- 1982: Carpets International becomes Interface Flooring Systems, Inc, and acquires Compact Carpet of Canada, renaming it Interface Flooring Systems Canada, Inc.
- 1994: Ray Anderson experiences "spear in the chest” epiphany, leading Interface to establish Mission Zero.
- 1994: Ray Anderson reads Paul Hawken's book The Ecology of Commerce, inspiring his first environmental speech; develops framework to track and measure sustainability progress, classified as Mount Sustainability.
- 1995: Interface establishes ReEntry Recycling Program, which reclaims carpet to ensure used flooring tiles do not end up in landfills.
- 1996: Interface partners with yarn suppliers to develop recycled nylon.
- 1998: The company introduces NexStep polyurethane cushion backing.
- 2001: Interface establishes new backing system, GlasBacRE, now featuring up to 81% total recycled content.
- 2003: Interface launches first residential product through FLOR.
- 2003: Interface becomes the first carpet company to receive Environmentally Preferable Product (EPP) certification for its products and the first company to introduce Climate Neutral product offering through its Cool Carpet program.
- 2006: Interface unveils TacTiles, the first glue-free and sustainable flooring installation method.
- 2008: Interface is first to pilot Environmental Product Declarations (EPDs).
- 2010: Interface develops first product with 100% recycled nylon with yarn supplier Aquafil.
- 2012: Interface and the Zoological Society of London launched Net-Works in the Philippines. Participating communities sold discarded fishing nets for recycling by Aquafil into nylon yarn used in Interface carpet tiles.
- 2015: Interface introduces Skinny Planks, 25 x 100 cm carpet planks that can be used to create similar patterns to those found on timber or vinyl flooring.
- 2017: Interface announces entry into the hard surface flooring category with a line of luxury vinyl tile (LVT).
- 2017: Interface announces Proof Positive, a first-of-its-kind, carbon negative carpet tile prototype.
- 2018: Interface develops first carbon negative carpet tile backing, CircuitBac Green, to further reduce flooring’s carbon footprint.
- 2018: Interface acquired rubber flooring manufacturer Nora Systems for approximately $400 million. Nora had previously been majority-owned by Intermediate Capital Group.
- 2019: Interface declares its entire portfolio carbon neutral across the entire product lifecycle through its Carbon Neutral Floors program.
- 2019: Interface celebrates Mission Zero success and continues to activate on Climate Take Back; releases 25th Sustainability Report, highlighting lessons learned and key EcoMetrics.
- 2020: Interface launches Embodied Beauty collection, with first-ever cradle-to-gate carbon negative carpet tile.
- 2021: Interface receives third-party validation of its 2030 science-based GHG reduction targets.
- 2023: Interface introduces Past Forward™, a global carpet tile collection celebrating 50 years of iconic design through modern reinterpretations of archival patterns.
- 2024: Interface's residential brand, FLOR, launches a new area rug collaboration with fashion designer Trina Turk, blending bold patterns and vibrant colors inspired by California style.
- 2025: Interface introduces first-of-its-kind carbon negative nora rubber flooring prototype.
- 2025: Interface celebrates 25 years of its i2™ design approach with new carpet tile collections with the platform’s modular, non-directional innovation.
- 2025: Interface begins incorporating captured carbon in its carpet tile manufacturing processes.
- 2026: Interface introduces noravant, a first-of-its-kind PVC-free resilient flooring solution.
