= Les Enfants Terribles (Bouffon Theatre Company) =

Les Enfants Terribles (LET)
- Formation: 2008
- Type: Theatre group
- Purpose: Bouffon
- Location: Chicago, United States
- Website: Archived link

Les Enfants Terribles (LET) is a former American theatre ensemble based out of Chicago, Illinois. They practice the traditional French clowning style of bouffon.

In their debut show Prom Night in July 2010, directed by Keland Sher for Red Tape Theatre, there were six bouffants: Scott Ray Merchant, Casey Kells, Alex Kyger, Christopher Paul Mueller, Brian Rad, Eric Ryan Swanson.

Their website has been inactive since 2012, and their Twitter profile has been inactive since 2011.
