= DC Central Kitchen =

U.S. nonprofit organization

- Formation: 1989
- Type: Non-profit
- Purpose: Food recycling
- Location: Washington, D.C., U.S.
- Official language: English
- Website: dccentralkitchen.org

DC Central Kitchen is a nationally recognized nonprofit and social enterprise that uses food as a tool to train unemployed adults to develop work skills while providing thousands of meals for local service agencies in the process. Chef José Andrés serves on the board.

== History ==
DC Central Kitchen was founded in 1989 by Robert Egger. Egger was working in the bar/nightclub scene in DC when he and his wife were talked into volunteering with a church group that bought food to prepare and distribute from the back of a van. Its first major food recovery was from the 1989 inaugural party for President George H. W. Bush.

That same year, DC Central Kitchen started a culinary training program. In 2011, the organization started its Healthy Corners Initiative in an effort to bring affordable produce to low-income neighborhoods. In 2023 the program marked 1 million units of food sold. As of 2026, the Healthy Corners program is in 56 corner stores throughout Washington, D.C.

DC Central Kitchen is the food service provider for 30 schools throughout Washington, D.C. Their Healthy School Food program won the 2015 Golden Carrot Award from the Physicians Committee for Responsible Medicine. The program received the 2024 Community Leadership Award by the President's Council on Sports, Fitness & Nutrition.

In 2017, the organization joined with The Craig Newmark Philanthropic Fund to run a matching campaign during the Campus Kitchens Project fundraising challenge, "Raise the Dough." That same year, the Washington Capitals teamed up with SuperFD Catering to create a cookbook pledging to donate one hundred percent of the proceeds from sales to DC Central Kitchen.

Its annual fundraiser, Capital Food Fight, has raised over $12 million for DC Central Kitchen programming since 2004. Previous competitors, hosts and judges include Ted Allen, José Andrés, Rick Bayless, Anthony Bourdain, Tom Colicchio, Duff Goldman, Carla Hall, Padma Lakshmi, Spike Mendelsohn, Adam Richman, Eric Ripert, Art Smith, Bryan and Michael Voltaggio, and Andrew Zimmern.

Since its creation, the Kitchen has served over 54 million meals, graduated over 2,000 formerly homeless men and women from its Culinary Job Training program, and replicated its model on college and high-school campuses through its program The Campus Kitchen Project.

As of 2026, the Kitchen prepares and distributes 17,000 meals to 80+ homeless shelters, transitional homes, nonprofit organization and Washington, D.C. schools.

José Andrés notes his time volunteering, serving on the board and fundraising on behalf of DC Central Kitchen as one of the inspirations for creating World Central Kitchen.
