= Freerice =

Click-to-donate site associated with the World Food Programme

- Website type: Click-to-donate site
- Headquarters: Rome, Italy
- Owner: World Food Programme
- Creator: John Breen
- Website: freerice.com
- Commercial: No
- Launched: 2007; 19 years ago
- Current status: Active

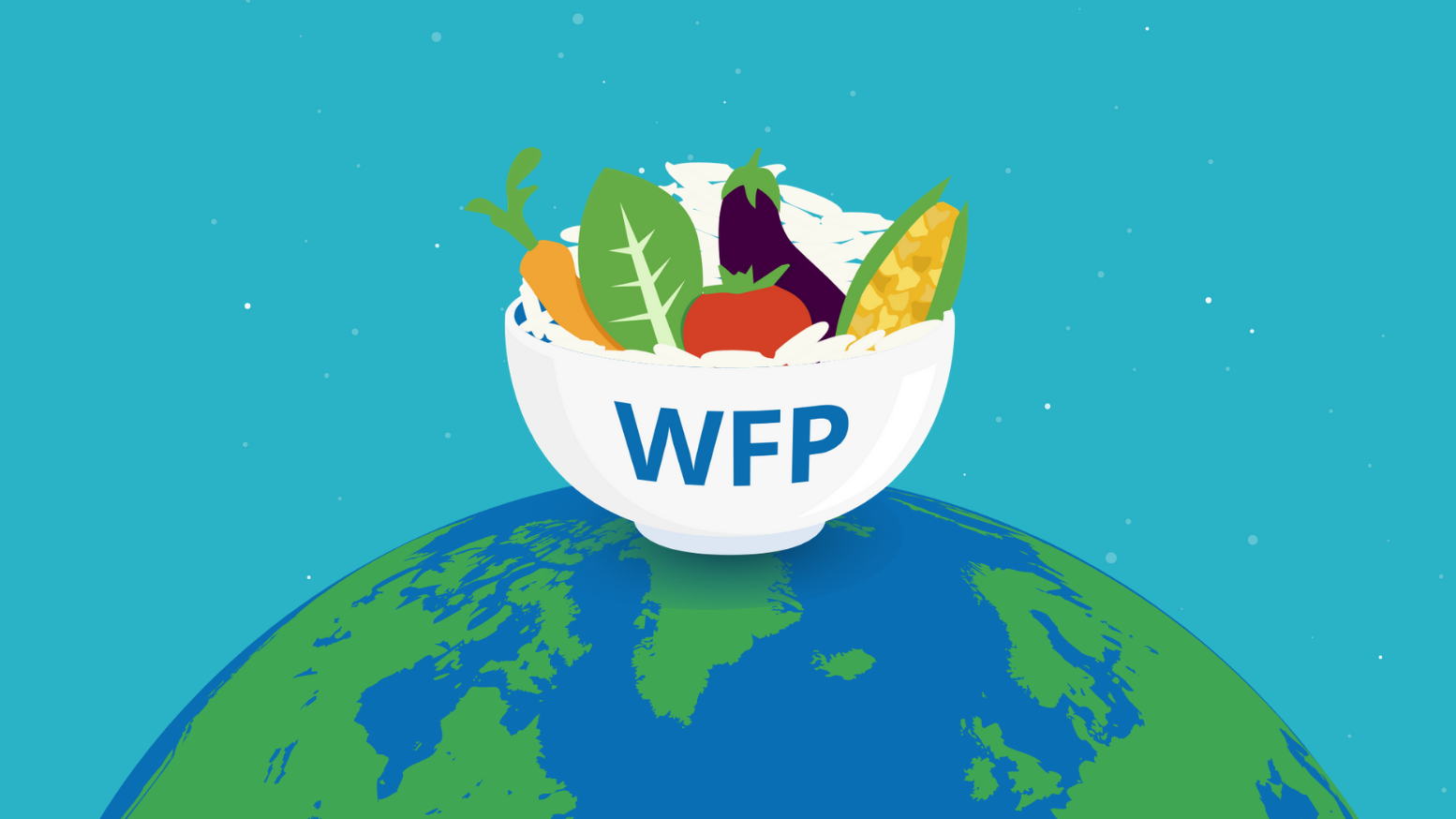
A rice bowl on a globe, filling up every 50 grains

Freerice, originally FreeRice, is a website-based application that allows players to donate rice to families in developing countries by playing a multiple-choice quiz game. For every question a user answers correctly, 10 grains of rice are donated via the United Nations World Food Programme (WFP). There are over 50 categories, including English Proverbs, Multiplication Table, German, Flags of the World, and World Heritage Sites. The categories can be played on up to five difficulty levels, from easiest to hardest, depending on the subject. A user's total score is displayed as a mound of rice and the number of grains earned.

== History ==
The website went live on October 7, 2007, and 830 grains of rice were donated on its first day. The site was created by John Breen, a computer programmer, to help his son study for the SAT exam. The second word in its name was originally capitalized as "FreeRice". On November 20, 2007, the WFP launched a campaign to "feed a child for Thanksgiving", encouraging internet users "to take time out from traditionally the busiest online shopping period of the year and help the hungry" by playing the game. For a brief while, the amount of rice donated per correct answer was increased to 20 grains. Within a few months, this amount was reduced to 10 grains of rice per answer.

In March 2009, Breen donated the FreeRice website to the World Food Programme.

=== Freerice 2.0 launch ===
In September 2010, the UN World Food Programme launched a new version of the game with social networking, groups, rankings, and achievements. As part of the launch, the site dropped the second capitalization in its name, going from "FreeRice" to "Freerice".

=== Freerice Beta Launch ===
In August 2018, the UN World Food Programme launched a newer, more improved version of the game on a new website. Apps for iOS and Android have also been released with this version of the website.

== Effectiveness ==
In its first ten months of operation, Freerice donated over 42 billion grains of rice. One month after the inception of the viral marketing program, users had earned enough points for one billion grains of rice. The United Nations World Food Program stated that this amount could feed 50,000 people for one day, since it takes 400 grams or about 19,200 grains of rice to feed one adult for a day. Using this calculation, enough rice was donated in 2008 to feed over 6,000 people daily for each day of that year. Since its inception, as of April 3, 2013, Freerice players had earned sufficient rice for over 10 million meals, assuming 2 meals per day.

== Awards ==
- Digital Communications Award 2011 – Best Corporate Game
- Time magazine –50 Best Websites 2011
- 15th Annual Webby Awards – Honoree
- 2010 Parent's Choice Awards –Online Learning
- Time magazine – 50 Best Websites 2008
- Yahoo! Pick of the Year 2007 – Charity Category – Winner
- Berkman Award to Freerice.com creator, John Breen. He was recognized with a Berkman Award on May 16, 2008, for creating Freerice. At Harvard University's Berkman Center for Internet & Society's tenth-anniversary gala dinner, recipients of the Berkman Awards were chosen for their outstanding contributions to the Internet's impact on society over the past 10 years.

== See also ==
- Ripple (charitable organisation)
