= Click-to-donate site =

Type of website

A click-to-donate site is a website where users can click a button to generate a donation for a charity without spending any of their own money. The money for the donation comes from advertisers whose banners are displayed each time a user clicks the button. While not directly contributing (though many sites offer additional ways of support), visitors are making a difference in the sense that, had they not visited, no donation would have been given.

In most cases, the donation generated by each user only amounts to a few cents, but the goal is to accumulate enough clicks to add up to a significant amount.

Many charities launched this style of program in the late 1990s. However, the constriction of online advertising spending around 2001 following the dot-com collapse caused many sites to be closed. Yet there are still many in operation, notably Freerice, The Hunger Site, and Por Los Chicos.

Flattr and CentUp (now defunct) used click-to-donate technology on many sites instead of being centralized on just one.

== See also ==
- Crowdfunding
- Microfinance
