= RMI (energy organization) =

Global clean energy non-profit organization

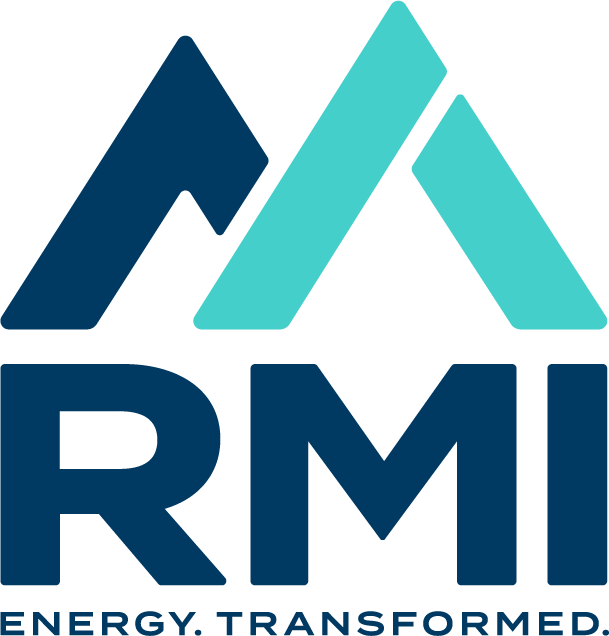
- Motto: Energy. Transformed.
- Established: 1982
- Chief Executive Officer: Jon Creyts
- Budget: Revenue: $170,174,000; Expenses: $158,736,000 (FYE June 2024)
- Address: 22830 Two Rivers Road; Basalt, CO 81621
- Location: Basalt, Colorado, United States
- Coordinates: 39°18′30″N 106°58′56″W
- Interactive map of RMI
- Website: rmi.org

RMI, (formerly the Rocky Mountain Institute), is a non-profit organization co-founded in the United States by Amory Lovins. Established in 1982, RMI has grown into a broad-based institution that is active in more than 60 countries with over 700 staff and annual revenues of $170 million in 2023–24. RMI works with businesses, policymakers, financial institutions, local communities, and other partners to drive investment in clean energy solutions.

== History ==
In 1982, a married couple, Amory Lovins, an experimental physicist, and L. Hunter Lovins (formerly Sheldon), a lawyer, forester, and social scientist founded Rocky Mountain Institute, based in Colorado. Together with a group of colleagues, the Lovinses fostered efficient resource use and policy development that they believed would promote global security. By the mid-1980s, RMI grew into an organization with a staff of around fifty.

The Lovinses described the "hard energy path" as involving inefficient liquid-fuel automotive transport, as well as giant centralized electricity-generating facilities, often burning fossil fuels such as coal or petroleum, or harnessing a fission reaction, greatly complicated by electricity wastage and loss. The "soft energy path" which they wholly preferred involves efficient use of energy, diversity of energy production methods (and matched in scale and quality to end uses), and special reliance on "soft technologies" such as solar, wind, biofuels, and geothermal. According to the institute, large-scale electricity production facilities had an important place, but it was a place that they were already filling in the 1970s; in general, more would not be needed. In a 1989 speech, Amory Lovins introduced the related concept of Negawatt power, in which creating a market for trading increased efficiency could supply additional electrical energy to consumers without increasing generation capacity—such as building more power plants.

In the 1990s, RMI convened a team of designers and engineers to develop a super-efficient prototype automobile, which they dubbed the Hypercar.

In December 2014, RMI merged with Carbon War Room. In June 2017, RMI merged with WattTime, an organization providing real-time power plant data to consumer devices for automatic dispatchable power consumption. RMI, in 2021, launched Canary Media, a nonprofit newsroom covering the clean energy transition.

In 2021, the Rocky Mountain Institute rebranded itself as RMI.

== Books ==
Books published by RMI include:

- Winning the Oil Endgame: Innovation for Profit, Jobs and Security (2005) ISBN 1-84407-194-4 (Available Online in PDF)
- Small is Profitable: The Hidden Economic Benefits of Making Electrical Resources the Right Size (2003) ISBN 1-881071-07-3
- Natural Capitalism: Creating the Next Industrial Revolution (2000) ISBN 1-85383-763-6
- Reinventing Fire: Bold Business Solutions for the New Energy Era (2011) ISBN 978-1-60358-371-8.

== See also ==
- Association négaWatt
- E. Kyle Datta
- Negawatt power
- Plug-in Hybrid Electric Vehicle
- Soft energy path
- Soft energy technology
- Transition town
