= Brittle Power =

Book by Amory and L. Hunter Lovins

- Author: Amory B. Lovins; L. Hunter Lovins
- Language: English
- Subject: U.S. energy infrastructure
- Genre: Non-Fiction
- Publisher: Brick House Publishing Company
- Publication date: June 1, 1982
- Publication place: United States
- Media type: Novel
- Pages: 486
- ISBN: 0-931790-28-X

Brittle Power: Energy Strategy for National Security is a 1982 book by Amory B. Lovins and L. Hunter Lovins, prepared originally as a Pentagon study and re-released in 2001 following the September 11 attacks. The book argues that the U.S. domestic energy infrastructure is very vulnerable to disruption, whether by accident or malice, often even more so than US technology is vulnerable to disruption of the imported oil supply. According to the authors, a resilient energy system is feasible, costs less, works better, and is favoured in the market, but is rejected by U.S. policy. In the preface to the 2001 edition, Lovins explains that these themes are still very current.

== Vulnerability to large-scale failures ==
Lovins argues that the United States has for decades been running on energy that is "brittle" (easily shattered by accident or malice) and that this poses a grave and growing threat to national security, life, and liberty.

Lovins explains that this danger comes not from hostile ideology but from misapplied technology. The size, complexity, pattern, and control structure of the electrical power system makes it inherently vulnerable to large-scale failures. The same is true of the technologies that deliver coal, gas, and oil for running buildings, vehicles, and industries. Reliance on these delicately poised energy systems has unwittingly put at risk the entire American way of life.

Lovins' detailed research shows that these vulnerabilities are increasingly being exploited. Brittle Power documents many significant assaults on energy facilities, other than during a war, in 40 countries and within the United States, in some 24 states.

== Resilient energy systems ==
Lovins claims that most energy utilities and governments are unsuccessfully trying to build high technical reliability into power plants so large that their cost of failure is unacceptable. A resilient energy supply system may instead consist of numerous, relatively small sustainable energy sources, each with a low individual cost of failure. Potentially these individual energy sources "are renewable: they harness the energy of the sun, wind, water, or farm and forestry wastes, rather than that of depletable fuels".

== Central message ==
Amory B. and L. Hunter Lovins reiterated the main message of Brittle Power in "Terrorism and Brittle Technology", Chapter 3 in Albert H. Teich's book Technology and the Future (2003):

The foundation of a secure energy system is to need less energy in the first place, then to get it from sources that are inherently invulnerable because they're diverse, dispersed, renewable, and mainly local. They're secure not because they're American but because of their design. Any highly centralised energy system – pipelines, nuclear plants, refineries – invites devastating attack. But invulnerable alternatives don't, and can't, fail on a large scale.

== Networked island-able microgrids ==
In his book Reinventing Fire (2011), Amory B. Lovins puts forward a vision of networked island-able microgrids where energy is generated locally from solar power, wind power, and other resources, and used by super-efficient buildings. When each building, or neighborhood, is generating its own power, with links to other "islands" of power, the security of the entire network is greatly enhanced. Lovins has said that in the face of hundreds of blackouts in 2005, Cuba reorganized its electricity transmission system into networked microgrids and cut the occurrence of blackouts to zero within two years, limiting damage even after two hurricanes. Denmark has performed tests of islanding a region ("cell") to maintain robustness with smaller local assets rather than large centralized ones.

== See also ==
=== Major blackouts ===
- 2011 Southwest blackout
- 2010 Chile blackout
- 2019 Argentina, Paraguay and Uruguay blackout
- New York City blackout of 1977
- Northeast blackout of 2003

=== Related publications ===
- Megaprojects and Risk: An Anatomy of Ambition (2003)
- Small Is Beautiful: A Study of Economics As If People Mattered (1973)
- Small Is Profitable: The Hidden Economic Benefits of Making Electrical Resources the Right Size (2002)
- When Technology Fails (1994)
- Winning the Oil Endgame: Innovation for Profits, Jobs and Security (2005)

=== Related concepts ===
- Aurora Generator Test
- Efficient energy use
- Energy conservation
- Energy security and renewable technology
- List of major power outages
- Renewable energy commercialization
- Soft energy path
- Soft energy technology
- Vulnerability of nuclear facilities to attack
