= E. Kyle Datta =

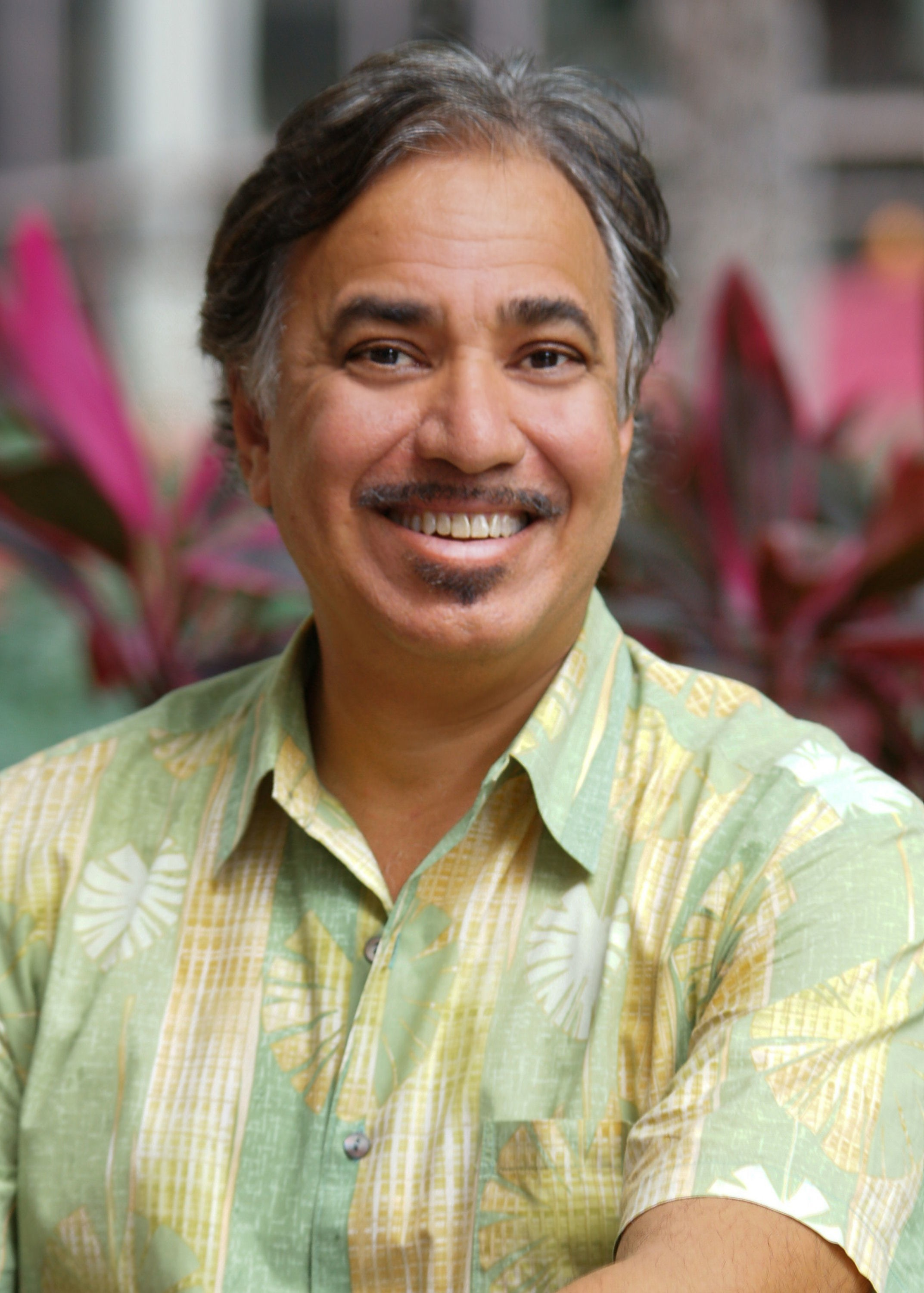
- Kyle Datta in 2012
- Occupation: General Partner of Ulupono Initiative
- Board member of: Blue Planet Foundation, Parker Ranch, Johnson Ohana Charitable Foundation

Kyle Datta, named to the Puerto Rico Electric Power Authority Transformation Advisory Council. The Puerto Rico Electric Power Authority (PREPA) announced the names of 11 utility industry leaders who will serve as founding members of PREPA's Transformation Advisory Council (TAC). The TAC was formed to provide PREPA's Governing Board and management team with advice on the development of a long-term vision and transformation execution plan for the power system in Puerto Rico. the TAC consist of recognized executive leaders from the public power and investor owned utility sector and from select non-governmental organizations. Collectively, the TAC members are experts in grid reliability and resilience, corporate restructuring, sustainability, island grids, public power, customer engagement, evolving regulatory frameworks for distributed energy resources, and the utility of the future. Mr. Datta has overseen the development of PREPA's most recent IRP which was released in draft form and calls for 2,000 MW of Solar PV and 1,000 MW of Battery Energy Storage along with a groundbreaking mini grid design to create a resilient energy system.

Kyle Datta had a long and distinguished career in energy with over 22 years in C-level positions across the industry in several roles.

Most recently, Kyle Datta was the founder and General Partner of the Ulupono Initiative, an impact investing firm reporting to Pierre Omidyar, chairman of eBay. During Datta's tenure, Ulupono has invested nearly $80 million in organizations across the state that are working to increase the quality of life for Hawai‘i's residents by producing more local food, generating more renewable energy, increasing clean transportation, and supporting better management of water and waste.“We are so grateful for all of Kyle’s work to help build Ulupono over the last decade,” said Mike Mohr, board member of Ulupono Initiative. “His strategic systems approach to tackling some of our state’s biggest challenges lays the foundation for transformative change to help Hawai‘i be more resilient and self-sufficient for many years to come.”

Previously, he was the CEO of U.S. Biodiesel Group, a national biodiesel firm funded by private equity; managing director of research and consulting at the Rocky Mountain Institute; and a vice president of Booz, Allen & Hamilton, where he was the managing partner of the firm's Asia Energy Practice and later led the U.S. Utilities practice. Datta holds Bachelor of Science, master in environmental science in resource economics, and master in public and private management degrees from Yale University. He was CEO of New Energy Partners, an energy consulting and renewable development firm located in Hawaii. He has co-authored several books including Winning the Oil Endgame (2005), and Small is Profitable (2002).

Datta serves on the board of directors for Blue Planet Foundation, Hawaii BioEnergy, Johnson Ohana Charitable Foundation, and Sustainable Agriculture and Food Systems Funders.

== See also ==
- Amory Lovins
- Soft energy technology
