= Winning the Oil Endgame =

2005 book

- Author: Amory B. Lovins
- Language: English
- Genre: Non-fiction
- Publisher: Rocky Mountain Institute
- Publication date: 2005
- Publication place: United States
- Media type: Print (Hardback & Paperback)
- Pages: 306
- ISBN: 978-1881071105

Winning the Oil Endgame: Innovation for Profits, Jobs and Security is a 2005 book by Amory B. Lovins, E. Kyle Datta, Odd-Even Bustnes, Jonathan G. Koomey, and Nathan J. Glasgow, published by the Rocky Mountain Institute. It presents an independent, transdisciplinary analysis of four ways to reduce petroleum dependence in the United States:

- Using oil more efficiently, through smarter technologies that wring more (and often better) services from less oil (pp. 29–102).
- Substituting for petroleum fuels other liquids made from biomass or wastes (pp. 103–111).
- Substituting saved natural gas for oil in uses where they’re interchangeable, such as furnaces and boilers (pp. 111–122).
- Replacing oil with hydrogen made from non-oil resources (pp. 228–242).

== Problems and solutions ==
The authors explain that the problems of oil dependence are manageable, suggesting that oil dependence is a problem we need no longer have. The proposed solutions to oil dependence are profitable and U.S. oil dependence can be eliminated by proven and attractive technologies that create wealth, enhance choice, and strengthen common security. The authors argue that America can lead the world into the post-petroleum era and create a vibrant economy. (p.xiii)

== Reviews ==
Winning the Oil Endgame has received many positive reviews and the Wall Street Journal called the book "Perhaps the most rigorous and surely the most dramatic analysis of what it will take to wean us from foreign oil ... carried out by the Rocky Mountain Institute, a respected center of hard-headed, market-based research."

== The Author ==
Amory Lovins has published 28 books and hundreds of papers. His work has been recognized by the Right Livelihood Award, Onassis, Nissan, Shingo and Mitchell prizes, a MacArthur Fellowship, the Happold Medal, eight honorary doctorates, and the Heinz, Lindbergh, World Technology, and Hero of the Planet Awards. Lovins has also acted as a consultant to many Fortune 500 companies.

== See also ==
- Brittle Power
- Efficient energy use
- Energy conservation
- Hypercar
- Peak oil
- Plug-in Hybrid Electric Vehicle
- Renewable energy commercialization
- Soft energy technology
- Soft energy path
- The Carbon War: Global Warming and the End of the Oil Era
