= Gray energy =

Grey energy may refer to:

- Energy produced from fossil fuels, a usage appearing in conjunction with the Regulating Energy Tax in the Netherlands
- Embodied energy, the total energy used to make something
- The term "grey energy" (or "gray energy") refers to energy produced from polluting sources as a contrast to green energy from renewable, non-polluting sources.
