= Hypercar (concept car) =

Rocky Mountain Institute's ultra-efficient car design

The Hypercar is a design concept car developed by energy analyst Amory Lovins at the Rocky Mountain Institute. This vehicle would have ultra-light construction with an aerodynamic body using advanced composite materials, low-drag design, and hybrid drive. Designers of the Hypercar claim that it would achieve a three- to five-fold improvement in fuel economy, equal or better performance, safety, amenity, and affordability, compared with today's cars.

== History ==
In 1994, the Rocky Mountain Institute (RMI) founded the Hypercar Center to help prove its technical feasibility and commercial reality. The concept was placed in the public domain to maximize competition in capturing its market and manufacturing advantages. The "Hypercar" would be a "hybrid electric/hydrogen-fuelled family vehicle that had only a few parts, was made of lightweight carbon but was stronger than steel, used existing technologies, weighed half a normal car of its size, and could travel the equivalent of 300 miles to the gallon. It was designed to have next to no emissions and, using its batteries, could become a power plant on wheels when parked, eliminating the need for nuclear or coal-power stations".

In 1999, RMI took this process a step further by launching a for-profit venture, Hypercar Inc. In 2004, Hypercar Inc. changed its name to Fiberforge to better reflect the company's new goal of lowering the cost of high-volume advanced-composite structures by leveraging the patents of David F. Taggart, one of the founders of Hypercar Inc.

Lovins says the commercialisation of the Hypercar began in 2014, with the production of the all-carbon electric BMW i3 family and the 313 miles per gallon Volkswagen XL1.

== See also ==
- Hybrid vehicles
- Green vehicle
- Supercar
- Twike
- Volkswagen 1-litre car
- Winning the Oil Endgame
- Aptera
