= Tom Bender (architect) =

American architect (1941–2020)

Tom Bender (September 24, 1941 – March 4, 2020) was one of the American founders of the green architecture and sustainability movements.

== Life ==
Thomas Guernsey Bender was born in 1941 in Fostoria, Ohio. He began to make his mark in the early 1970s as an educator, architect, historian of non-Western architecture, author, and strategic planner. He has since been visible also in the emerging field of sustainable economics.

His research, writing, and architectural design since the 1970s was to development of the relatively new field of solar and ecological architectural design. Bender was an associate professor of architecture in the University of Minnesota, and the Project Ouroboros he co-directed there with Dennis Holloway in the early 1970s was one of the first demonstrations of "resource-self-reliant houses."

Like Amory Lovins and some other modern analysts, Bender demonstrated the feasibility and benefit of major reduction of energy usage (often through the decrease of on-site energy wastage) rather than a massive increase of centralized energy-production facilities in a society.

Tom Bender moved to Oregon in 1974 to serve as an energy researcher for Governor Tom McCall during the early 1970s energy crisis. Cosmic Economics, which he co-authored, showed the hazards of dependence on fossil fuels, the role of peak oil in global warming, and the benefits of extraction taxes for fossil fuels and minerals.

The term "sustainability" which he coined in his 1975 essay, Sharing Smaller Pies, has become core to current progressive cultural perspectives. During that decade, Bender was also the co-editor of RAIN: Journal of Appropriate Technologies. As a theorist and practitioner of the "green" approach to planning and design, he has been a popular essayist since that time.

These principles have received interest from governments of Austria, the Netherlands, and Norway, as well as endorsement by the European Union, the World Business Council for Sustainable Development, and UNEP.

In local application demonstrating these concepts, he has been a co-founder of Fire Mountain School, the Lower Nehalem Community Trust, NeahCasa, and the local community center.[3][4] He lived on Neahkahnie Mountain, on the Oregon coast and designed many residencies and public buildings in the surrounding communities. Many of his writings are available on his website.

Bender died on March 4, 2020, in the home he and his partner constructed on Neahkahnie Mountain, near Manzanita Oregon.

== Awards ==
- California Affordable Housing Award (1981)
- Sustainable Community Solutions international competition award (the American Institute of Architects & International Union of Architects, 1993)
- National Award for Sustainable Design (AIA Architecture and Energy Program, 2001)
- Top 10 Green Buildings (2002) from the AIA for his Bank of Astoria project in Manzanita, Oregon.

== Books and other media ==
- "The five horsemen of our apocalypse", Daily Astorian, 6/11/2009
- "SUSTAINABLE BUSINESS: ECONOMICS, ARCHITECTURE, AND BANKING", GreenMoney Journal, Spring 2010
- Environmental Design Primer, 1973.
- Silence, Song & Shadows, 2000.
- Building with the Breath of Life, 2000.
- Learning to Count What Really Counts: the Economics of Wholeness, 2002.
- Building with the Breath of Life, DVD, 2003.
- The Cave Temples of India, DVD, 2004.
- The Physics of Qi Energy, DVD, 2007.
- The Economics of True Sustainability, 2013.

== See also ==
- Green building
- Soft energy path
- Sim Van der Ryn
- Paolo Soleri
- Mike Reynolds
- List of American architects
