= Embodied energy =

Sum of all the energy required to produce any goods or services

Embodied energy is the sum of all the energy required to produce any goods or services, considered as if that energy were incorporated or 'embodied' in the product itself. The concept can help determine the effectiveness of energy-producing or energy saving devices, or the "real" replacement cost of a building, and, because energy-inputs usually entail greenhouse gas emissions, in deciding whether a product contributes to or mitigates global warming. One fundamental purpose for measuring this quantity is to compare the amount of energy produced or saved by the product in question to the amount of energy consumed in producing it.

Embodied energy is an accounting method that aims to find the sum total of the energy necessary for an entire product lifecycle. Determining what constitutes this lifecycle includes assessing the relevance and extent of energy in raw material extraction, transport, manufacture, assembly, installation, disassembly, deconstruction and/or decomposition, as well as human and secondary resources.

== History ==
The history of constructing a system of accounts that records the energy flows through an environment can be traced back to the origins of accounting. As a distinct method, it is often associated with the Physiocrat's "substance" theory of value, and later the agricultural energetics of Sergei Podolinsky, a Russian physician, and the ecological energetics of Vladmir Stanchinsky.

The main methods of embodied energy accounting that are used today grew out of Wassily Leontief's input-output model and are called Input-Output Embodied Energy analysis. Leontief's input-output model was in turn an adaptation of the neo-classical theory of general equilibrium with application to "the empirical study of the quantitative interdependence between interrelated economic activities". According to Tennenbaum Leontief's Input-Output method was adapted to embodied energy analysis by Hannon to describe ecosystem energy flows. Hannon's adaptation tabulated the total direct and indirect energy requirements (the energy intensity) for each output made by the system. The total amount of energies, direct and indirect, for the entire amount of production was called the embodied energy.

== Methodologies ==
Embodied energy analysis is interested in what energy goes to supporting a consumer, and so all energy depreciation is assigned to the final demand of the consumer. Different methodologies use different scales of data to calculate energy embodied in products and services of nature and human civilization. International consensus on the appropriateness of data scales and methodologies is pending. This difficulty can give a wide range in embodied energy values for any given material. In the absence of a comprehensive global embodied energy public dynamic database, embodied energy calculations may omit important data on, for example, the rural road/highway construction and maintenance needed to move a product, marketing, advertising, catering services, non-human services and the like. Such omissions can be a source of significant methodological error in embodied energy estimations. Without an estimation and declaration of the embodied energy error, it is difficult to calibrate the sustainability index, and so the value of any given material, process or service to environmental and economic processes.

=== Standards ===
The SBTool, UK Code for Sustainable Homes was, and USA LEED still is, a method in which the embodied energy of a product or material is rated, along with other factors, to assess a building's environmental impact. Embodied energy is a concept for which scientists have not yet agreed absolute universal values because there are many variables to take into account, but most agree that products can be compared to each other to see which has more and which has less embodied energy. Comparative lists (for an example, see the University of Bath Embodied Energy & Carbon Material Inventory) contain average absolute values, and explain the factors which have been taken into account when compiling the lists.

Typical embodied energy units used are MJ/kg (megajoules of energy needed to make a kilogram of product), tCO_{2} (tonnes of carbon dioxide created by the energy needed to make a kilogram of product). Converting MJ to tCO_{2} is not straightforward because different types of energy (oil, wind, solar, nuclear and so on) emit different amounts of carbon dioxide, so the actual amount of carbon dioxide emitted when a product is made will be dependent on the type of energy used in the manufacturing process. For example, the Australian Government gives a global average of 0.098 tCO_{2} = 1 GJ. This is the same as 1 MJ = 0.098 kgCO_{2} = 98 gCO_{2} or 1 kgCO_{2} = 10.204 MJ.

=== Related methodologies ===
In the 2000s, drought conditions in Australia generated interest in the application of embodied energy analysis methods to water. This has led to the use of the concept of embodied water.

== Data ==
Many databases exist to quantify the embodied energy of goods and services, including materials and products. These are based on various data sources, with geographic and temporal relevance variations and system boundary completeness. One such database is the Environmental Performance in Construction (EPiC) Database developed at The University of Melbourne, which includes embodied energy data for over 250 mainly construction materials. This database also includes values for embodied water and greenhouse gas emissions. The main reason for the differences in embodied energy data between databases is the source of data and methodology used in their compilation. Bottom-up 'process' data is typically sourced from product manufacturers and suppliers. While this data is generally more reliable and specific to particular products, the methodology used to collect process data typically results in much of the embodied energy of a product being excluded, mainly due to the time, costs and complexity of data collection. Based on national statistics, top-down environmentally-extended input-output (EEIO) data can be used to fill these data gaps. While EEIO analysis of products can be useful on its own for initial scoping of embodied energy, it is generally much less reliable than process data and rarely relevant for a specific product or material. Hence, hybrid methods for quantifying embodied energy have been developed, using available process data and filling any data gaps with EEIO data. Databases that rely on this hybrid approach, such as The University of Melbourne's EPiC Database, provide a more comprehensive assessment of the embodied energy of products and materials.

== In common materials ==
Selected data from the Inventory of Carbon and Energy ('ICE') prepared by the University of Bath (UK)

Material	Energy MJ/kg	Carbon kg CO_{2}/kg	Material density kg/m^{3}
Aggregate	0.083	0.0048	2240
Concrete (1:1.5:3)	1.11	0.159	2400
Bricks (common)	3	0.24	1700
Concrete block (Medium density)	0.67	0.073	1450
Aerated block	3.5	0.3	750
Limestone block	0.85		2180
Marble	2	0.116	2500
Cement mortar (1:3)	1.33	0.208	
Steel (general, av. recycled content)	20.1	1.37	7800
Stainless steel	56.7	6.15	7850
Timber (general, excludes sequestration)	8.5	0.46	480–720
Glue laminated timber	12	0.87	
Cellulose insulation (loose fill)	0.94–3.3		43
Cork insulation	26		160
Glass fibre insulation (glass wool)	28	1.35	12
Flax insulation	39.5	1.7	30
Rockwool (slab)	16.8	1.05	24
Expanded Polystyrene insulation	88.6	2.55	15–30
Polyurethane insulation (rigid foam)	101.5	3.48	30
Wool (recycled) insulation	20.9		25
Straw bale	0.91		100–110
Mineral fibre roofing tile	37	2.7	1850
Slate	0.1–1.0	0.006–0.058	1600
Clay tile	6.5	0.45	1900
Aluminium (general & incl 33% recycled)	155	8.24	2700
Bitumen (general)	51	0.38–0.43	
Medium-density fibreboard	11	0.72	680–760
Plywood	15	1.07	540–700
Plasterboard	6.75	0.38	800
Gypsum plaster	1.8	0.12	1120
Glass	15	0.85	2500
PVC (general)	77.2	2.41	1380
Vinyl flooring	65.64	2.92	1200
Terrazzo tiles	1.4	0.12	1750
Ceramic tiles	12	0.74	2000
Wool carpet	106	5.53	
Wallpaper	36.4	1.93	
Vitrified clay pipe (DN 500)	7.9	0.52	
Iron (general)	25	1.91	7870
Copper (average incl. 37% recycled)	42	2.6	8600
Lead (incl 61% recycled)	25.21	1.57	11340
Ceramic sanitary ware	29	1.51	
Paint - Water-borne	59	2.12	
Paint - Solvent-borne	97	3.13	

Photovoltaic (PV) Cells Type	Energy MJ per m^{2}	Energy kWh per m^{2}	Carbon kg CO_{2} per m^{2}
Monocrystalline (average)	4750	1319.5	242
Polycrystalline (average)	4070	1130.5	208
Thin film (average)	1305	362.5	67

== In transportation ==
Theoretically, embodied energy is the energy used to extract materials from mines, manufacture vehicles, assemble, transport, maintain, transform them to transport energy, and ultimately recycle these vehicles. Besides, the energy needed to build and sustain transport networks, whether road or rail, should also be considered. The process to be implemented is so complex that no one dares to put forward a figure.

According to the Institut du développement durable et des relations internationales, in the field of transportation, "it is striking to note that we consume more embodied energy in our transportation expenditures than direct energy", and "we consume less energy to move around in our personal vehicles than we consume the energy we need to produce, sell and transport the cars, trains or buses we use".

Jean-Marc Jancovici advocates a carbon footprint analysis of any transportation infrastructure project, before its construction.

=== In automobiles ===
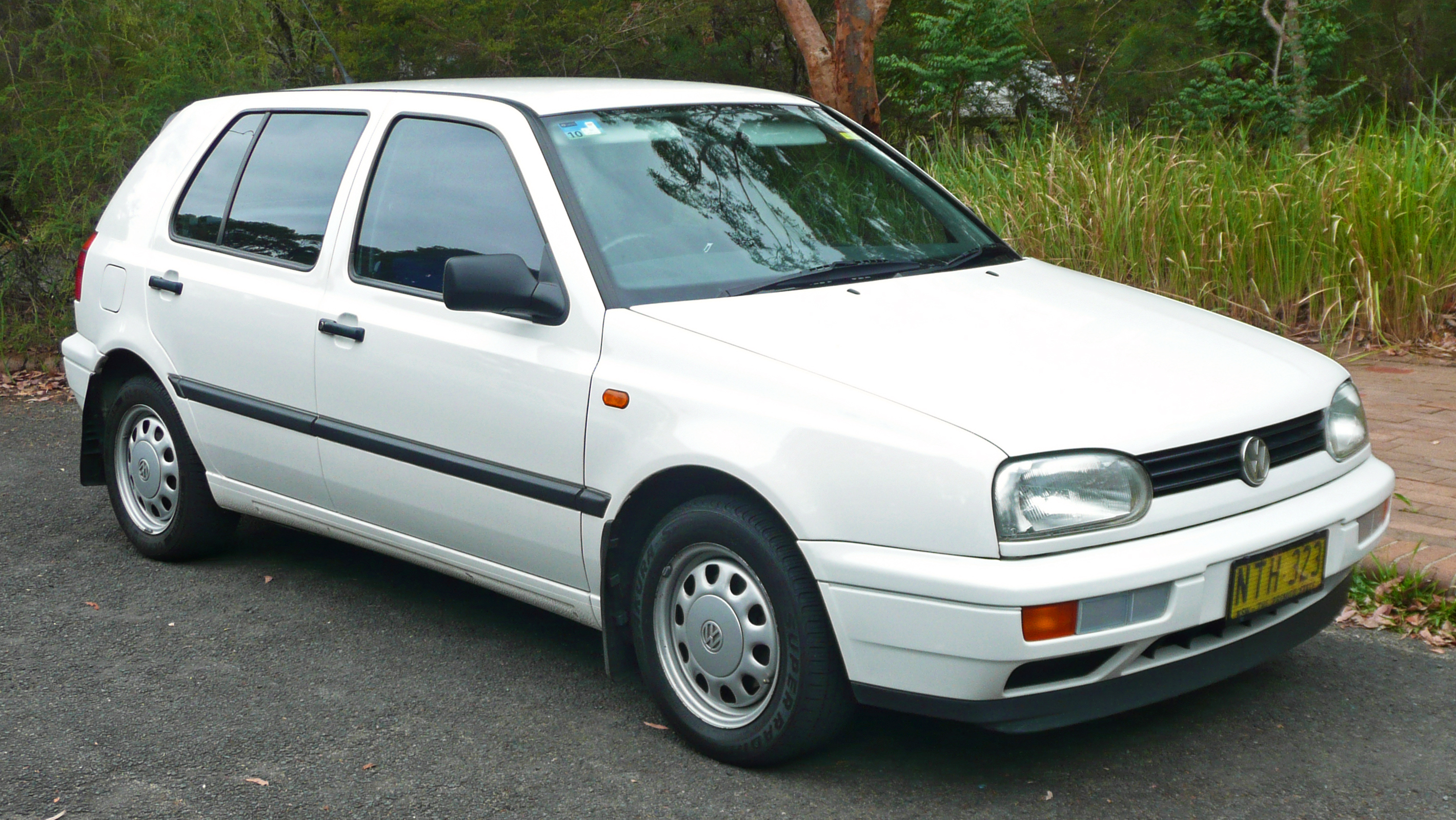
The embodied energy contents of a Volkswagen Golf A3 car is 18 000 kWh, the electric energy produced by roughly 9 tons of coal

Car life cycle

==== Manufacturing ====
According to Volkswagen, the embodied energy contents of a Golf A3 with a petrol engine amounts to 18 000 kWh (i.e. 12% of 545 GJ as shown in the report). A Golf A4 (equipped with a turbocharged direct injection) will show an embodied energy amounting to 22 000 kWh (i.e. 15% of 545 GJ as shown in the report). According to the French energy and environment agency ADEME a motor car has an embodied energy contents of 20 800 kWh whereas an electric vehicle shows an embodied energy contents amounting to 34 700 kWh.

An electric car has a higher embodied energy than a combustion engine one, owing to the battery and electronics. According to Science & Vie, the embodied energy of batteries is so high that rechargeable hybrid cars constitute the most appropriate solution, with their batteries smaller than those of an all-electric car.

==== Fuel ====
As regards energy itself, the factor energy returned on energy invested (EROEI) of fuel can be estimated at 8, which means that to some amount of useful energy provided by fuel should be added 1/7 of that amount in embodied energy of the fuel. In other words, the fuel consumption should be augmented by 14.3% due to the fuel EROEI.

According to some authors, to produce 6 liters of petrol requires 42 kWh of embodied energy (which corresponds to approximately 4.2 liters of diesel in terms of energy content).

==== Road construction ====
We have to work here with figures, which prove still more difficult to obtain. In the case of road construction, the embodied energy would amount to 1/18 of the fuel consumption (i.e. 6%).

==== Other figures available ====
Treloar, et al. have estimated the embodied energy in an average automobile in Australia as 0.27 terajoules (i.e. 75 000 kWh) as one component in an overall analysis of the energy involved in road transportation.

== In buildings ==
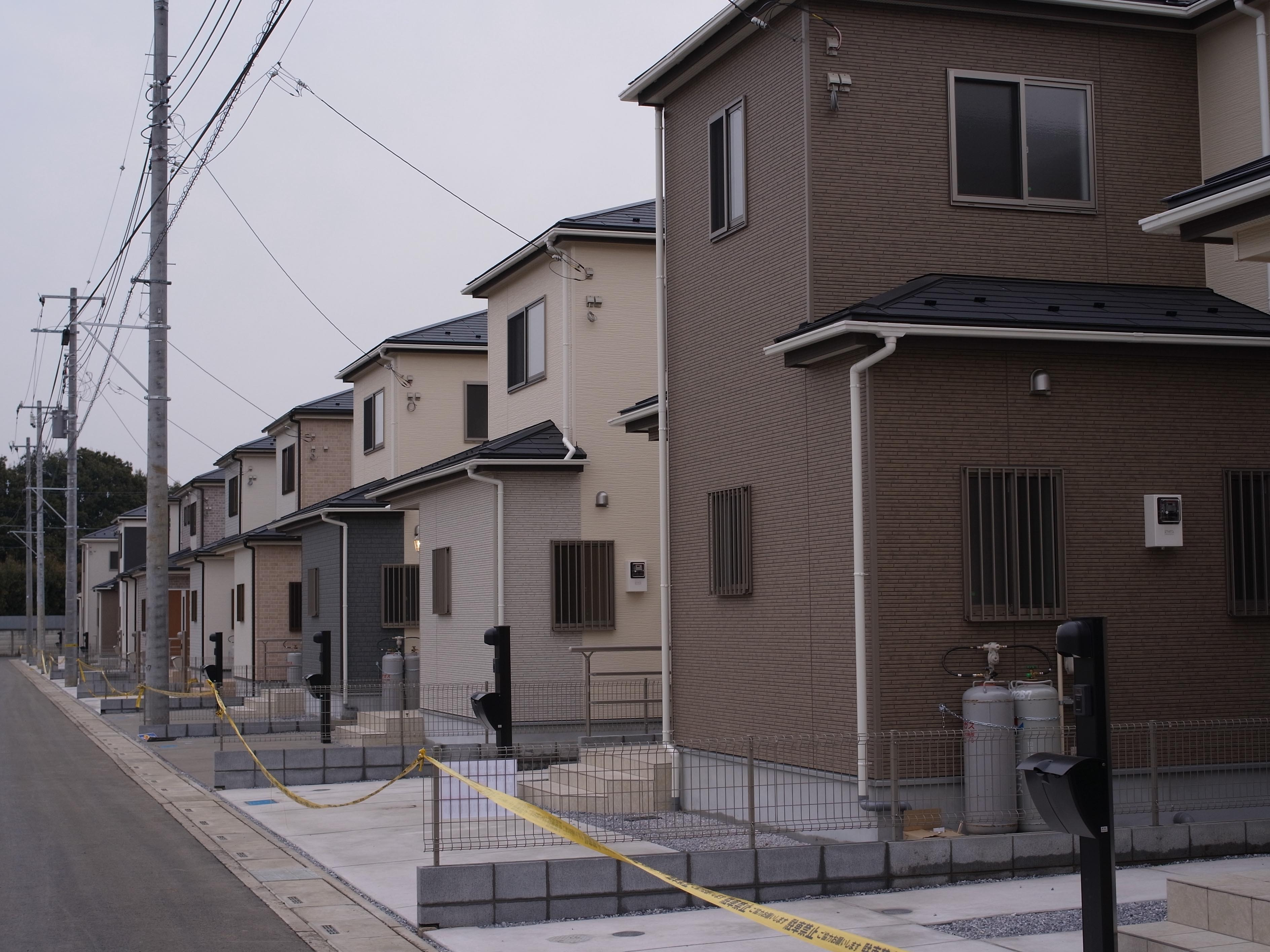
The typical lifespan of a house in Japan is fewer than 30 years

Although most of the focus for improving energy efficiency in buildings has been on their operational emissions, it is estimated that about 30% of all energy consumed throughout the lifetime of a building can be in its embodied energy (this percentage varies based on factors such as age of building, climate, and materials). In the past, this percentage was much lower, but as much focus has been placed on reducing operational emissions (such as efficiency improvements in heating and cooling systems), the embodied energy contribution has come much more into play. Examples of embodied energy include: the energy used to extract raw resources, process materials, assemble product components, transport between each step, construction, maintenance and repair, deconstruction and disposal. As such, it is important to employ a whole-life carbon accounting framework to analyze the carbon emissions in buildings. Studies have also shown the need to go beyond the building scale and to take into account the energy associated with mobility of occupants and the embodied energy of infrastructure requirements, in order to avoid shifting energy needs across scales of the built environment.

== In the energy field ==
=== EROEI ===
EROEI (Energy Returned On Energy Invested) provides a basis for evaluating the embodied energy due to energy.

Final energy has to be multiplied by $\frac {\hbox{1}} {\hbox{EROEI-1}}$ in order to get the embodied energy.

Given an EROEI of eight, for example, a seventh of the final energy corresponds to the embodied energy.

Not only that, but embodied energy due to the construction and maintenance of power plants should also be taken into account to really obtain overall embodied energy. Here, figures are badly needed.

=== Electricity ===
In the BP Statistical Review of World Energy June 2018, toe are converted into kWh "on the basis of thermal equivalence assuming 38% conversion efficiency in a modern thermal power station".

In France, by convention, the ratio between primary energy and final energy in electricity amounts to 2.58, corresponding to an efficiency of 38.8%.

In Germany, on the contrary, because of the swift development of the renewable energies, the ratio between primary energy and final energy in electricity amounts to only 1.8, corresponding to an efficiency of 55.5%.

According to EcoPassenger, overall electricity efficiency would amount to 34% in the UK, 36% in Germany and 29% in France.

== Data processing ==
According to association négaWatt, embodied energy related to digital services amounted to 3.5 TWh/a for networks and 10.0 TWh/a for data centres (half for the servers per se, i. e. 5 TWh/a, and the other half for the buildings in which they are housed, i. e. 5 TWh/a), figures valid in France, in 2015. The organization is optimistic about the evolution of the energy consumption in the digital field, underlining the technical progress being made. The Shift Project, chaired by Jean-Marc Jancovici, contradicts the optimistic vision of the association négaWatt, and notes that the digital energy footprint is growing at 9% per year.

== See also ==
- Biophysical economics
- Crystallized labor
- Ecological economics
- Embodied emissions
- Energy accounting
- Energy cannibalism
- Energy economics
- Environmental accounting
- Life cycle assessment
- Systems ecology
- Labor theory of value

== Bibliography ==
- Clark, D.H.; Treloar, G.J.; Blair, R. (2003). "Estimating the increasing cost of commercial buildings in Australia due to greenhouse emissions trading". In Yang, J.; Brandon, P.S.; Sidwell, A.C. (eds.). Proceedings of the CIB 2003 International Conference on Smart and Sustainable Built Environment, Brisbane, Australia. hdl:10536/DRO/DU:30009596. ISBN 978-1741070415. OCLC 224896901.
- Costanza, R. (1979). Embodied Energy Basis for Economic-Ecologic Systems (Ph.D.). University of Florida. OCLC 05720193. UF00089540:00001.
- Crawford, R.H. (2005). "Validation of the Use of Input-Output Data for Embodied Energy Analysis of the Australian Construction Industry". Journal of Construction Research. 6 (1): 71–90. doi:10.1142/S1609945105000250.
- Crawford, R.H.; Stephan, A.; Prideaux, F. (2019). Environmental Performance in Construction (EPiC) Database. Melbourne, Victoria, Australia: The University of Melbourne. doi:10.26188/5dc1e272cbedc.
- Lenzen, M. (2001). "Errors in conventional and input-output-based life-cycle inventories". Journal of Industrial Ecology. 4 (4): 127–148. doi:10.1162/10881980052541981. S2CID 154022052.
- Lenzen, M.; Treloar, G.J. (February 2002). "Embodied energy in buildings: wood versus concrete-reply to Börjesson and Gustavsson". Energy Policy. 30 (3): 249–255. Bibcode:2002EnPol..30..249L. doi:10.1016/S0301-4215(01)00142-2.
- Treloar, G.J. (1997). "Extracting Embodied Energy Paths from Input-Output Tables: Towards an Input-Output-based Hybrid Energy Analysis Method". Economic Systems Research. 9 (4): 375–391. doi:10.1080/09535319700000032.
- Treloar, Graham J. (1998). A comprehensive embodied energy analysis framework (Ph.D.). Deakin University. hdl:10536/DRO/DU:30023444.
- Treloar, G.J.; Owen, C.; Fay, R. (2001). "Environmental assessment of rammed earth construction systems" (PDF). Structural Survey. 19 (2): 99–105. doi:10.1108/02630800110393680.
- Treloar, G.J.; Love, P.E.D.; Holt, G.D. (2001). "Using national input-output data for embodied energy analysis of individual residential buildings". Construction Management and Economics. 19 (1): 49–61. doi:10.1080/014461901452076. S2CID 110124981.
