= Ulupono Initiative =

- Company type: Private
- Industry: Grantmaking, Advocacy, Investing
- Founded: 2009
- Founders: Pierre Omidyar; Pam Omidyar
- Headquarters: Honolulu, Hawaii, United States
- Number of locations: 1
- Area served: Hawaiʻi
- Key people: Murray Clay (President)
- Number of employees: 10-15
- Parent: The Omidyar Group
- Website: Ulupono.com

Ulupono Initiative is a Hawai‘i-based and -focused organization that uses impact investing, non-profit grant-making, and advocacy with the stated goals of "increasing the amount of locally produced food, renewable energy and clean transportation, and improving water and waste management."

eBay founder Pierre Omidyar and his wife Pamela Kerr established Ulupono in 2009, after each spent parts of their childhood in Hawai‘i.

== Activities ==
Ulupono has conducted for-profit investments in areas including solar energy, biofuels, electric vehicle charging networks, expanded local agriculture such as re-establishing homegrown dairy and grass-fed beef industries, and waste reduction projects.

When Ulupono was founded in 2009, Kyle Datta and Robin Campaniano occupied leadership roles in the company.

Ulupono advocated a Hawai‘i state constitutional amendment to allow farmers, ranchers and owners of other agricultural endeavors to request special purpose revenue bonds (SPRB). The measure passed with 50.2% of the vote in Hawaii's 2014 general election. Ulupono, the main funder of the "Local Food Coalition", contributed $500,000 of the $507,400 (98.5%) raised for the amendment's passage.

Honolulu-based Ulupono received $875,000 in state tax credits under a 2008 law that created incentives for landowners to preserve prime farmland for agricultural use in perpetuity. Ulupono said in a written statement that it is disappointed that Hawaii Dairy Farms didn't succeed but that the tax credit program provided an incentive to take on risk with the project it estimated would cost $17.5 million.

Ulupono first invested $1 million in Honolulu Seawater Air Conditioning in August 2013; in November 2014, Ulupono Initiative and Capital Cooling purchased a majority stake in the company. The proposed $250 million project was appropriated State of Hawaii government backed Special Purpose Revenue Bonds in 2005 of up to $48 million with extensions in 2010 and 2015; in 2007 of up to $20 million with an extension in 2012; and in 2009 of up to $77 million with extensions in 2014 and 2019 (expiration on June 30, 2024) after consistently not completing the project in time. The Hawaii State Legislature did not renew the Special Purpose Revenue Bond allocation from 2005 in the 2020 legislative session. Ulupono invested more than $6 million in the project. In December 2020, Honolulu Seawater Air Conditioning announced it would conclude its operations by the end of January 2021, citing rising construction costs.

In 2014, Hawaii Constitutional Amendment 2, which "allows the State to issue special purpose revenue bonds to assist agricultural enterprises on any type of land, rather than only important agricultural lands" passed with 50.2%, 0.2% more than required and making it the closest ballot initiative in Hawaii's history. Ulupono contributed $500,000 of the $507,400 (98.5%) raised for the amendment's passage. The League of Women Voters noted the concern about Amendment 2's passage was, "Large, for-profit agribusiness will also be eligible for low cost, privately-funded loans. This will give them a competitive advantage over small farms".

In March 2017, JLL released a report commissioned by Ulupono claiming that the Honolulu Authority for Rapid Transportation (HART) could save up to $570 million on construction of the Skyline rail system by working with private contractors. The analysis concluded that the project remained dependent on public funding to close the $2 billion funding gap. Delays in funding could further delay the project, potentially costing the taxpayers of Hawaii up to $114 million per year. In response to Ulupono's report, HART worked with Ernst & Young to investigate possible public-private funding models.

In September 2020, the city announced it was withdrawing from the effort to land a private-sector partner on the rail project. HART shared that it was canceling the public-private effort two months later. An 11-mile section of the Skyline rail opened in June 2023.

Ulupono has provided funding to Bikeshare Hawaii, which runs the Biki bike-sharing program launched in 2017. Biki announced in April 2021 that due to revenue lost during the COVID-19 pandemic, it would cut services by up to 60 percent. By October 2021, returning tourism had led to an increase in Biki use, and the organization claimed it was able to make less deep cuts than initially anticipated. Biki marked six years in operation and nearly six million rides in June 2023.

== Investment portfolio ==
Ulupono has invested in companies including Hawaii Dairy Farms on Kauai, Honolulu Seawater Air Conditioning, Sopogy, SolarCity, Blue Ocean Mariculture, Hawaii BioEnergy, Phycal, Kapalua Farms on Maui, Oceanic Institute Research Feed Mill, Ibis Networks, and Bioenergy Hawaii.
