= Association négaWatt =

- Founded: 2001

Association négaWatt is a French advocacy group based in Valence, Drôme. It was founded in 2001 to promote the negawatt concept and its application to French society. The association seeks to reduce the use of fossil fuels and nuclear power. Its approach is based on energy conservation, energy efficiency and the use of renewable energies. It published a scenario that details a path to phasing out these energy sources.

The association unites energy specialists in France, relying mostly on volunteer engineers. Other specialists include volunteer sociologists, economists and urban planners, who work together to create energy transition scenarios and to suggest political steps that would need to be taken.

Association négaWatt inspired local initiatives in transition towns called "Virage-Énergie," meaning "energy bend".

== NégaWatt scenario ==
The NégaWatt scenario spans from 2012 to 2050. The scenario starts by assessing energy needs for heating, transportation and specific electricity, and suggests a transition path. It then couples the NégaWatt and the Afterterres 2050 scenarios. The Afterres2050 association targets agriculture energy use and can evaluate biomass production, providing the NégaWatt scenario with realistic figures.

The scenario employs the power to gas process to compensate for the intermittent nature of most renewable energies. The stability of the electricity network is guaranteed with a maximal time step of one hour. The scenario concludes that proven technologies are available to effect the transition.

== Other countries ==
A Swiss NégaWatt organization was founded in 2016, on the basis of the French one.

== See also ==
- Rocky Mountain Institute
- Transition town
