= Energy security and renewable technology =

Renewable technologies contributions to energy security

The environmental benefits of renewable energy technologies are widely recognised, but the contribution that they can make to energy security is less well known. Renewable technologies can enhance energy security in electricity generation, heat supply, and transportation. Since renewable energy is more evenly distributed than fossil fuels at the global level, the use of renewable energy technologies can also lead to decentralized and self-sufficient energy systems and reduce energy dependencies among countries.

== Energy security ==
Access to cheap energy has become essential to the functioning of modern economies. However, the uneven distribution of fossil fuel supplies among countries, and the critical need to widely access energy resources, has led to significant vulnerabilities. Threats to global energy security include political instability of energy producing countries, manipulation of energy supplies, competition over energy sources, attacks on supply infrastructure, as well as accidents and natural disasters. Energy security, therefore, has become fundamental from many perspectives, and is being therefore increasingly at the centre of legal and policy issues linked to social, economic, and development matters.

The Fukushima I nuclear accidents in Japan have brought attention to how global energy systems are vulnerable to natural disasters. As climate change may bring more weather and climate extremes, it could cause threats to our current energy systems which provides a rationale for investing in renewable energy. Shifting to renewable energy "can help us to meet the dual goals of reducing greenhouse gas emissions, thereby limiting future extreme weather and climate impacts, and ensuring reliable, timely, and cost-efficient delivery of energy".

== Transportation ==
The International Energy Agency's World Energy Outlook 2006 concludes that rising petroleum demand, if left unchecked, would accentuate vulnerability to a severe supply disruption and resulting sudden price increases, in consuming countries. Renewable biofuels for transport represent a key source of diversification from petroleum products. Biofuels from grain and beet in temperate regions have a role, but they are relatively expensive and their energy efficiency and carbon dioxide savings, vary. Biofuels from sugar cane and other highly productive tropical crops are much more competitive and beneficial. But all first generation biofuels ultimately compete with the production of food for land, water, and other resources. More effort is required to develop and commercialize second generation biofuel technologies, such as biorefineries and cellulosic ethanol, enabling the flexible production of biofuels and related products from non-edible parts of the plant.

According to the International Energy Agency (IEA), cellulosic ethanol commercialization could allow ethanol fuels to play a much larger role in the future than previously thought. Cellulosic ethanol can be made from plant matter composed primarily of inedible cellulose fibers that form the stems and branches of most plants. Dedicated energy crops, such as switchgrass, are also promising cellulose sources that can be produced in many regions of the United States.

For electrification of transportation, recycling is the end state of first wave of electric vehicle batteries. Factories are operating to dismantle and reuse such batteries.

== Heating ==
In those countries where growing dependence on imported gas is a pressing energy security issue, renewable energy technologies can provide alternative sources of electric power production as well as displacing electricity demand through production of direct heat. The IEA suggests that the direct contribution that renewable energy can make to domestic or commercial space heating and industrial process heat should be examined more closely. Heat from solar, geothermal sources, and heat pumps, is increasingly economic but is often overlooked in government programmes that promote public acceptance and provide incentives for renewable electricity and energy efficiency.

Solar heating systems are a well known technology and generally consist of solar thermal collectors, a fluid system to move the heat from the collector to its point of usage, and a reservoir or tank for heat storage. The systems may be used to heat domestic hot water, swimming pools, or homes and businesses. The heat can also be used for industrial process applications or as an energy input for other uses such as cooling equipment. In many warmer climates, a solar heating system can provide a very high percentage (50 to 75%) of domestic hot water energy.

== Electricity generation ==
As the electricity grid becomes increasingly vulnerable to faults from equipment failure, willful attack or even sunspot activity, the risk of a major national scale grid failure is rising. The deployment of renewable technologies usually increases the diversity of electricity sources and, through local generation, contributes to the flexibility of the system and its resistance to central shocks. The IEA suggests that attention in this area has focused too much on the issue of the variability of renewable electricity production. However, this only applies to certain renewable technologies, mainly wind power and solar photovoltaics, and its significance depends on a range of factors which include the market penetration of the renewables concerned, the balance of plant and the wider connectivity of the system, as well as the demand side flexibility. Variability will rarely be a barrier to increased renewable energy deployment. But at high levels of market penetration it requires careful analysis and management, and additional costs may be required for back-up or system modification.

Renewable electricity supply in the 20-50+% penetration range has already been implemented in several European systems, albeit in the context of an integrated European grid system:

In 2010, four German states, totaling 10 million people, relied on wind power for 43–52% of their annual electricity needs. Denmark isn't far behind, supplying 22% of its power from wind in 2010 (26% in an average wind year). The Extremadura region of Spain is getting up to 25% of its electricity from solar, while the whole country meets 16% of its demand from wind. Just during 2005–2010, Portugal vaulted from 17% to 45% renewable electricity.

Minnkota Power Cooperative, the leading U.S. wind utility in 2009, supplied 38% of its retail sales from the wind.

Physicist Amory Lovins has said that following hundreds of blackouts in 2005, Cuba reorganized its electricity transmission system into networked microgrids and cut the occurrence of blackouts to zero within two years, limiting damage even after two hurricanes. Networked island-able microgrids describes Lovins’ vision where energy is generated locally from solar power, wind power and other resources and used by super-efficient buildings. When each building, or neighborhood, is generating its own power, with links to other “islands” of power, the security of the entire network is greatly enhanced.

== Combined Power Plant ==
The Combined Power Plant, a project linking 36 wind, solar, biomass, and hydroelectric installations throughout Germany, has demonstrated that a combination of renewable sources and more-effective control can balance out short-term power fluctuations and provide reliable electricity with 100 percent renewable energy.

== Impact of foreign investor dispute rights ==
It has been argued that investor-state dispute settlement rights may grant investors in carbon-intensive industries a mechanism to inhibit government policies promoting renewable energy technologies. The impact of dispute settlement through international arbitration or negotiation, however, is also deemed to be a useful tool to foster investment in sustainable energy and tackle connected issues linked to security, environmental threats, and sustainable development.

== See also ==
- Battery storage power station
- Brittle Power
- Energy Autonomy
- Energy independence
- Energy storage
- Environmental technology
- European super grid
- Grid energy storage
- Renewable Electricity and the Grid
