= Reinventing Fire =

2011 book by Amory Lovins

- Author: Amory B. Lovins
- Subject: Renewable energy Energy efficiency
- Publisher: Chelsea Green
- Publication date: 2011
- ISBN: 978-1-60358-371-8
- OCLC: 719429781

Reinventing Fire: Bold Business Solutions for the New Energy Era is a 2011 book, by Amory B. Lovins and the Rocky Mountain Institute, that explores converting the United States to almost total reliance on renewable energy sources, such as solar energy and wind power. Lovins says that renewable energy is already cheaper than fossil fuels and his analysis predicts further reductions in renewable energy prices.

Reinventing Fire was launched at the Washington National Geographic Society, in October 2011. Bill Clinton says the book is a “wise, detailed and comprehensive blueprint.” The book has forewords by Marvin Odum, from Shell Oil, and John W. Rowe, CEO of Exelon. The first paragraph of the preface says:

Imagine fuel without fear. No climate change. No oil spills, dead coal miners, dirty air, devastated lands, lost wildlife. No energy poverty. No oil-fed wars, tyrannies, or terrorists. Nothing to run out. Nothing to cut off. Nothing to worry about. Just energy abundance, benign and affordable, for all, for ever.

Fen Montaigne in The Guardian has said that the book is impressive in both its scope and detail:

Lovins discusses everything from how to redesign heavy trucks to make them more fuel efficient to ways to change factory pipes to conserve energy — the book lays out a plan for the U.S. to achieve the following by 2050: cars completely powered by hydrogen fuel cells, electricity, and biofuels; 84 percent of trucks and airplanes running on biomass fuels; 80 percent of the nation's electricity produced by renewable power; $5 trillion in savings; and an economy that has grown by 158 percent.

By combining reduced energy use with energy efficiency gains, Lovins says that there will be a $5 trillion saving over the next 40 years and a faster-growing economy. This can all be done, the book jacket says, without "new federal taxes, subsidies, mandates, or laws. The policy innovations needed to unlock and speed it need no act of Congress." The profitable commercialization of existing energy-saving technologies, through market forces, can be led by business.

== See also ==
- Our Choice
- Climate Capitalism
- Clean Tech Nation
- Renewable energy commercialization
- List of books about renewable energy
