= Amory Lovins =

American energy policy analyst

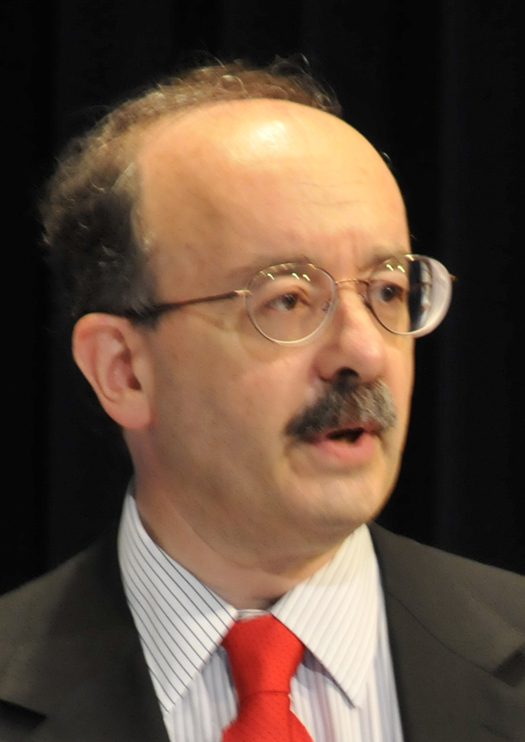
- Lovins in 2011
- Born: Amory Bloch Lovins; November 13, 1947 (age 78); Washington, D.C., U.S.
- Education: Harvard College (in Harvard University), Oxford University
- Occupations: Writer, advocate, scientist
- Known for: Advocacy of efficient energy use and soft energy paths
- Awards: Order of Merit of the Federal Republic of Germany (Bundesverdienstkreuz)

Amory Bloch Lovins (born November 13, 1947) is an American writer, physicist, and former chairman/chief scientist of the Rocky Mountain Institute. He has written on energy policy and related areas for four decades, and served on the US National Petroleum Council, an oil industry lobbying group, from 2011 to 2018.

Lovins has promoted energy efficiency, the use of renewable energy sources, and the generation of energy at or near the site where the energy is actually used. Lovins has also advocated a "negawatt revolution" arguing that utility customers don't want kilowatt-hours of electricity; they want energy services. In the 1990s, his work with Rocky Mountain Institute included the design of an ultra-efficient automobile, the Hypercar. He has provided expert testimony and published 31 books, including Reinventing Fire, Winning the Oil Endgame, Small is Profitable, Brittle Power, and Natural Capitalism.

== Early life and education ==
Lovins was born in Washington, DC. His father, Gerald H. Lovins worked as an engineer and his mother, Miriam Lovins, worked as a social services administrator. Lovins is the brother of Julie Beth Lovins, a computational linguist who wrote the first stemming algorithm for word matching.

In 1964, Lovins entered Harvard College as a National Merit Scholar. After two years there, he transferred to Oxford. In 1969, he became a junior research fellow at Merton College, Oxford, as a result of which he had a temporary Oxford master of arts status. He left without a degree in 1971, because the university would not allow him to pursue a doctorate in energy. Lovins moved to London to pursue his energy work, and returned to the United States in 1981. He settled in western Colorado in 1982.

Lovins' four grandparents emigrated to the United States from small villages lying between Kyiv and Odesa in Ukraine in the early 20th century. Most of his remaining family are believed to have been killed by German Nazis in the 1941 Tarashcha massacre.

== Work ==
=== Friends of the Earth ===
Each summer from 1965 to 1981, Lovins guided mountaineering trips and photographed the White Mountains of New Hampshire, contributing photographs to At Home in the Wild: New England's White Mountains. In 1971, he wrote about Wales' endangered Snowdonia National Park in the book, Eryri, the Mountains of Longing, commissioned by David Brower, president of Friends of the Earth. Lovins spent about a decade as British representative for Friends of the Earth.

During the early 1970s, Lovins became interested in resource policy, especially energy policy. The 1973 energy crisis helped create an audience for his writing and an essay originally penned as a U.N. paper grew into his first book concerned with energy, World Energy Strategies (1973). His next book was Non-Nuclear Futures: The Case for an Ethical Energy Strategy (1975), co-authored with John H. Price.

=== Rocky Mountain Institute ===
By 1978, Lovins had published six books and consulted widely. In 1982, he and his wife, Hunter Lovins founded Rocky Mountain Institute, based in Snowmass, Colorado. Together with a group of colleagues, the Lovinses fostered efficient resource use and sustainable development.

Lovins clients have included many Fortune 500 companies, real-estate developers, and utilities. Public-sector clients have included the OECD, UN, Resources for the Future, many national governments, and 13 US states. Lovins served in 1980 and 1981 on the U.S. Department of Energy's Energy Research Advisory Board, and from 1999 to 2001 and 2006 to 2008 on Defense Science Board task forces on military energy efficiency and strategy. His visiting academic chairs most recently included a visiting professorship in Stanford University's school of engineering.

Since 1982, RMI has grown into a broad-based "think-and-do tank" with more than 600 staff and an annual budget over $120 million. RMI has spun off five for-profit companies.

== Ideas ==
=== Soft energy paths ===
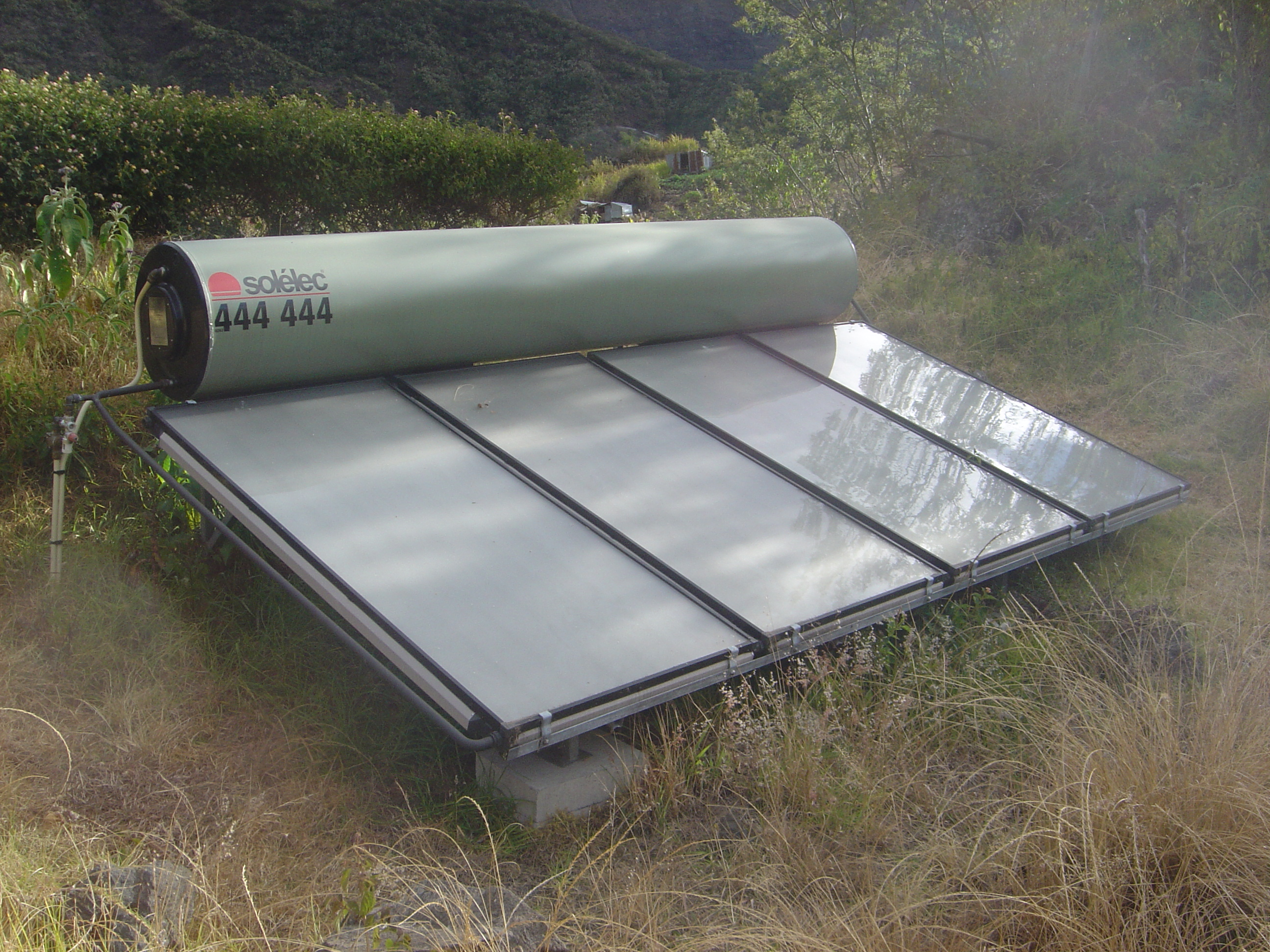
Solar energy technologies, such as solar water heaters, located on or near the buildings which they supply with energy, are a prime example of a soft energy technology.

Amory Lovins published an article in Foreign Affairs called "Energy Strategy: The Road Not Taken?" in 1976. Lovins argued that the United States had arrived at an important crossroads and could take one of two paths. The first, supported by U.S. policy, promised a future of steadily increasing reliance on fossil fuels and nuclear fission, and had serious environmental risks. The alternative, which Lovins called "the soft path", favored "benign" sources of renewable energy like wind power and solar power, along with a heightened commitment to energy conservation and energy efficiency. In October 1977, The Atlantic ran a cover story on Lovins' ideas. Residential solar energy technologies are prime examples of soft energy technologies and rapid deployment of simple, energy conserving, residential solar energy technologies is fundamental to a soft energy strategy.

Lovins has described the "hard energy path" as involving inefficient energy use and centralized, non-renewable energy sources such as fossil fuels. He believes soft path impacts are more "gentle, pleasant and manageable," than hard path impacts. These impacts range from the individual and household level to those affecting the very fabric of society at the national and international level.

Lovins on the Soft Path is a documentary film made by Amory and Hunter Lovins. It received "Best Science and Technology Film, San Francisco International Film Festival, 1983; Blue Ribbon, American Film Festival, 1982; Best of the Festival, Environmental Education Film Festival, 1982; Best Energy Film, International Environmental Film Festival, 1982; and Chris Bronze Plaque, Columbus International Film Festival, 1982."

=== Nuclear power limitations ===
Regarding nuclear power in the United Kingdom, Amory Lovins commented in 2014 that:

Britain's plan for a fleet of new nuclear power stations is ... unbelievable ... It is economically daft. The guaranteed price [being offered to French state company EDF] is over seven times the unsubsidized price of new wind in the US, four or five times the unsubsidized price of new solar power in the US. Nuclear prices only go up. Renewable energy prices come down. There is absolutely no business case for nuclear. The British policy has nothing to do with economic or any other rational base for decision making.

=== Negawatt revolution ===
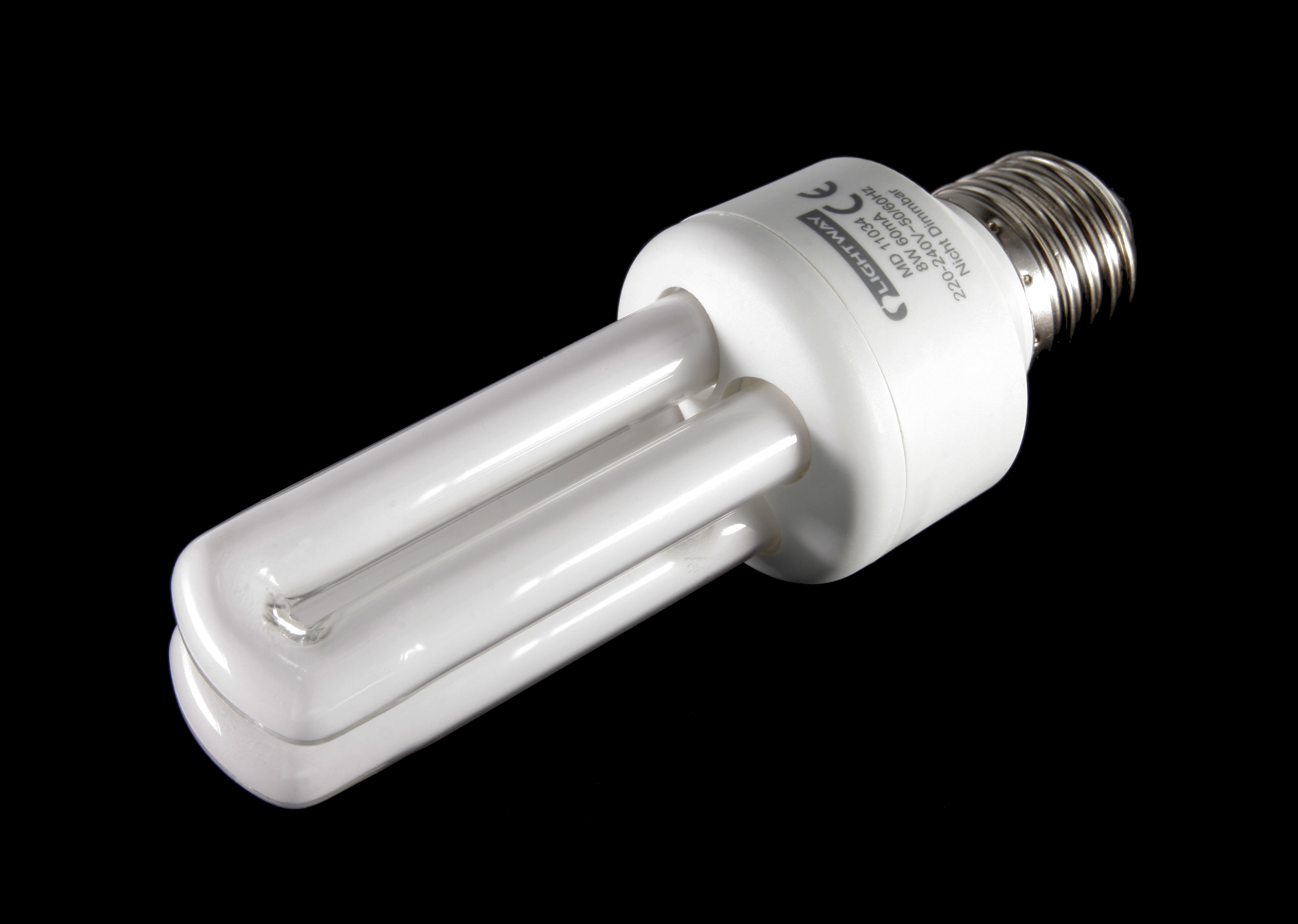
A "negawatt revolution" would involve the rapid deployment of electricity-saving technologies, such as compact fluorescent lamps.

A negawatt is a unit in watts of power saved. It is basically the opposite of a watt. Amory Lovins has advocated a "negawatt revolution", arguing that utility customers don't want kilowatt-hours of electricity; they want energy services such as hot showers, cold beer, lit rooms, and spinning shafts, which can come more cheaply if electricity is used more efficiently.

=== Hypercar ===
In 1994, Amory Lovins developed the design concept of the Hypercar. This vehicle would have ultra-light construction with an aerodynamic body using advanced composite materials, low-drag design, and hybrid drive. Designers of the Hypercar claim that it would achieve a three- to fivefold improvement in fuel economy, equal or better performance, safety, amenity, and affordability, compared with today's cars.

In 1999, RMI took this process a step further by launching a for-profit venture, Hypercar Inc. in which RMI has a minority interest. In 2004, Hypercar Inc. changed its name to Fiberforge to better reflect the company's new goal of lowering the cost of high-volume advanced-composite structures by leveraging the patents of David F. Taggart, one of the founders of Hypercar, Inc.

Lovins says the commercialization of the Hypercar began in 2014, with the production of the all-carbon electric BMW i3 family and the 313 miles per gallon Volkswagen XL1.

=== Citizen participation ===
Lovins does not see his energy ideas as green or left-wing, and he is an advocate of private enterprise and free market economics. He notes that Rupert Murdoch has made News Corporation carbon-neutral, with savings of millions of dollars. But, says Lovins, large institutions are becoming more "gridlocked and moribund", and he supports the rise of "citizen organizations" around the world.

Paul Hawken's Blessed Unrest chronicles the rise of millions of non-profit citizen organizations around the world — the greatest social movement in history. As central institutions become more gridlocked and moribund, a new vitality is beginning to spread renewal through the stem to the flower.

== Criticism ==
The Breakthrough Institute has criticized various positions taken by Amory Lovins. One of the main points of contention is the assumption by the RMI of a linear relation between improvements in energy efficiency and reductions in aggregate energy consumption. The Jevons Paradox suggests that improvements in energy efficiency actually lead to an increase in energy use, as a result of decreasing cost. This "rebound effect" is downplayed in the analyses performed by Lovins.

Other assumptions made by Lovins have also received criticism. For example, in Lovins' book, Reinventing Fire, it is assumed that 50% of all electricity in the US could come from wind in 2050. Other authors find that this is capped probably around 30%. Similar overestimates are identified in PV (solar), where estimates are made for about 30%; this is seen as implausible. Moreover, according to the authors, no analyses are given about the need for huge volumes of electricity storage, which would be needed when the sun doesn't shine and the wind doesn't blow.

== Awards ==
Amory Lovins was elected a Fellow of the American Association for the Advancement of Science in 1984, of the World Academy of Art and Science in 1988, and of the World Business Academy in 2001. He has received the Right Livelihood Award, the Blue Planet Prize, Volvo Environment Prize, the 4th Annual Heinz Award in the Environment in 1998, and the National Design (Design Mind), Jean Meyer, and Lindbergh Awards.

Lovins is also the recipient of the Time Hero for the Planet awards, the Benjamin Franklin and Happold Medals, the Harold and Margaret Sprout Award, and the Shingo, Nissan, Mitchell, and Onassis Prizes. He received a MacArthur Fellowship in 1993, and is an honorary member of the American Institute of Architects (AIA), a Foreign Member of the Royal Swedish Academy of Engineering Sciences, and an Honorary Senior Fellow of the Design Futures Council. He is on the Advisory Board of the Holcim Foundation.

In 2009, Time magazine named Lovins as one of the world's 100 most influential people.

On March 17, 2016, Lovins received the Bundesverdienstkreuz 1. Klasse (Officer's Cross of the Order of Merit) from the Federal Republic of Germany for intellectually underpinning Germany's Energiewende, most notably with his concept of "soft energy" and how that promotes peace and prosperity.

Lovins was a senior Ashoka Fellow in 2009.

== Personal life ==
In 1979 Amory Lovins married L. Hunter Sheldon, a lawyer, forester, and social scientist. They separated in 1989 and divorced in 1999. In 2007, he married Judy Hill, a fine-art landscape photographer.

== Books ==
This is a list of books which are authored or co-authored by Amory B. Lovins:

- World Energy Strategies: Facts, Issues, and Options London: Friends of the Earth Ltd. for Earth Resources Research Ltd., 1975. ISBN 978-0-88410-601-2.
- The Energy Controversy: Soft Path Questions and Answers (1979) ISBN 978-0-913890-22-6
- Non-Nuclear Futures: The Case for an Ethical Energy Strategy (with John H. Price) San Francisco, 1980. ISBN 978-0-06-090777-8
- Least-Cost Energy: Solving the CO2 Problem Andover, Mass. : Brick House Pub. Co., 1982 ISBN 978-0-931790-36-2
- Brittle Power: Energy Strategy for National Security (with L Hunter Lovins) Andover, Mass. : Brick House, 1982 re-released in 2001. ISBN 0-931790-28-X
- The First Nuclear World War (with Patrick O'Heffernan; L Hunter Lovins) New York: Morrow, 1983. ISBN 978-0-09-155830-7
- Reinventing Electric Utilities: Competition, Citizen Action, and Clean Power (1996) ISBN 978-1-55963-455-7
- Factor Four: Doubling Wealth – Halving Resource Use: A Report to the Club of Rome (1997) ISBN 978-1-85383-407-3
- Natural Capitalism (2000) ISBN 1-85383-763-6
- Small Is Profitable (2003) ISBN 1-881071-07-3
- The Natural Advantage Of Nations: Business Opportunities, Innovation And Governance in the 21st Century (2004) ISBN 1-84407-121-9
- Let the Mountains Talk, Let the Rivers Run: A Call to Save the Earth (2007) ISBN 978-1-57805-138-0

Non-English

- Faktor vier. Doppelter Wohlstand – halbierter Verbrauch (1997) ISBN 978-3-426-77286-7
- Facteur 4: Rapport au Club de Rome (1997) ISBN 978-2-904082-67-2
- Öko-Kapitalismus: Die industrielle Revolution des 21. Jahrhunderts (2002) ISBN 978-1-4000-3941-8

== See also ==
- Anti-nuclear movement in the United States
- Energy security and renewable technology
- Hermann Scheer
- Mark Z. Jacobson
- Renewable energy commercialization
