= Small Is Profitable =

2002 book by Amory Lovins and others

- Author: Amory Lovins
- Language: English
- Publication date: 2002
- Publication place: United States
- Media type: Print

Small Is Profitable: The Hidden Economic Benefits of Making Electrical Resources the Right Size is a 2002 book by energy analyst Amory Lovins and others. It was on the "Books of the year 2002" list for The Economist.

== See also ==
- Brittle Power
- Soft energy technology
- List of books by Amory Lovins
- Small business
- V2G
