= Volkswagen 1-litre car =

Volkswagen XL1
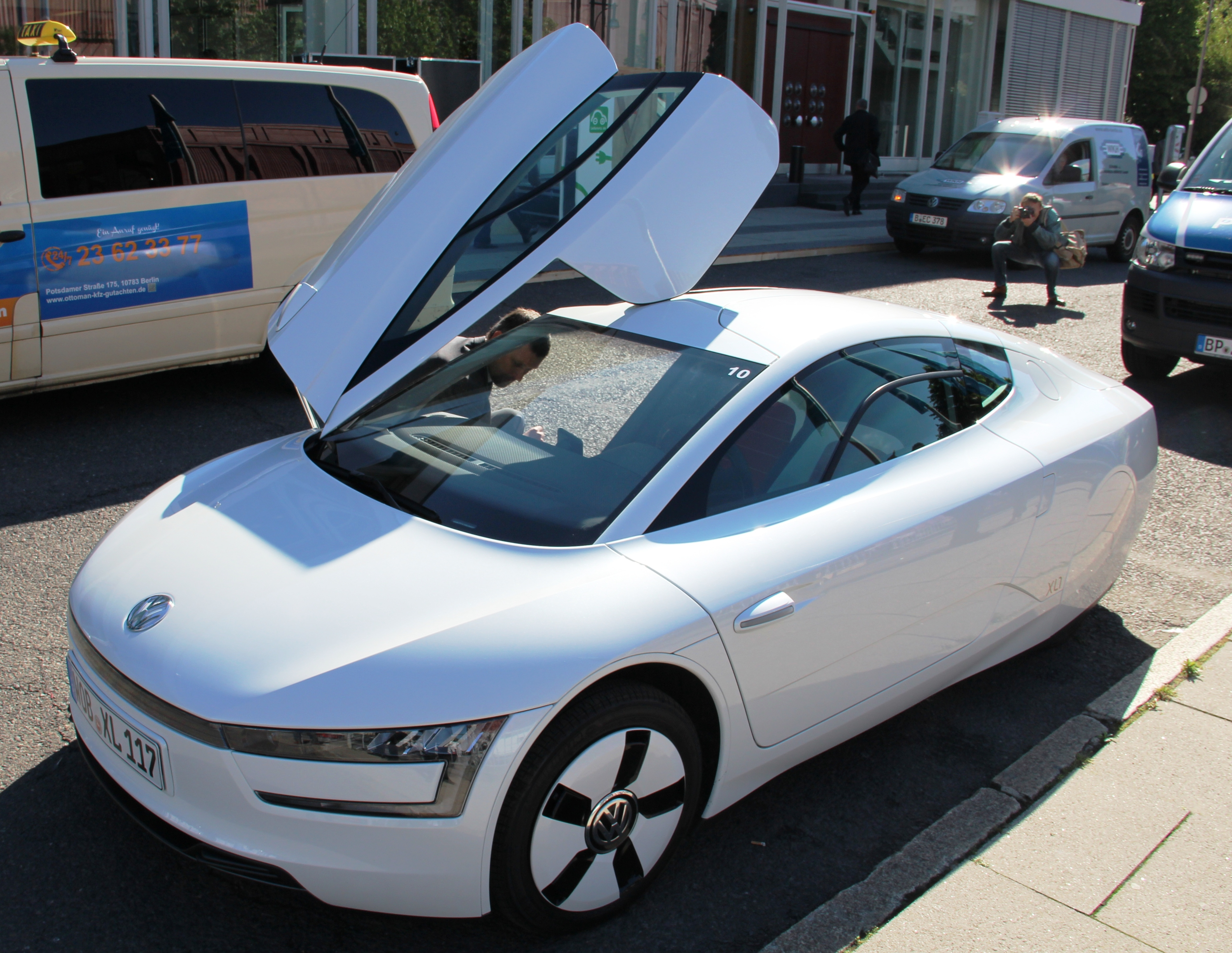
- 2015 Volkswagen XL1

Overview
- Manufacturer: Volkswagen
- Production: 2013–2016 (250 Units)
- Model years: 2014–2016
- Assembly: Germany: Osnabrück
- Designer: Klaus Bischoff, Thomas Ingenlath, Peter Wouda

Body and chassis
- Class: Subcompact car
- Body style: 2-door coupé
- Layout: RMR layout
- Doors: Butterfly

Powertrain
- Engine: 800 cc TDI twin-cylinder, common-rail turbo-diesel 35 kW (48 PS; 47 hp)
- Electric motor: 20 kW (27 PS; 27 bhp)
- Hybrid drivetrain: Parallel hybrid
- Battery: 5.5 kWh lithium-ion battery
- Electric range: 50 kilometres (31 mi)

Dimensions
- Wheelbase: 2,225 mm (87.6 in)
- Length: 3,888 mm (153.1 in)
- Width: 1,666 mm (65.6 in)
- Height: 1,153 mm (45.4 in)
- Curb weight: 795 kg (1,753 lb)

The Volkswagen XL1 (VW 1-litre) is a two-person limited production diesel-powered plug-in hybrid produced by Volkswagen.

Capable of travelling 100 km on 1 litre of diesel (280 mpg_{‑imp}; 240 mpg_{‑US}), with a fully charged battery, the XL1 was both roadworthy and practical. Without using electricity, the XL can travel 100 km on 2 litres of diesel. To achieve its economy, the XL1 used lightweight materials, a streamlined body and an engine and transmission designed and tuned for economy. The concept car was modified first in 2009 as the L1 and again in 2011 as the XL1.

A limited production of 250 began by mid 2013 with pricing started at €111,000 (~ £119,000). As a plug-in diesel-electric hybrid, the XL1 was available only in Europe and its 5.5 kWh lithium-ion battery delivered an all-electric range of 50 km (31 mi), had a fuel economy of 0.9 L/100 km (310 mpg_{‑imp}) under the NEDC cycle and produced emissions of 21 g/km of CO_{2}. It was released to retail customers in Germany in June 2014.

== History ==
=== 2002 VW 1-litre model ===
The prototype VW 1-litre concept car was shown to the public in April 2002 when Ferdinand Piëch, then chairman of the board of management, drove the concept between Wolfsburg and Hamburg as part of the Volkswagen annual meeting of stockholders.

For aerodynamics, the car seats two in tandem, rather than side-by-side. There are no rear view mirrors and it instead uses cameras and electronic displays. The rear wheels are close together to allow a streamlined body. The total aerodynamic drag is minimal because both the drag coefficient and frontal area are small (see drag equation). The drag coefficient (C_{d}) is 0.159, compared to 0.30 - 0.40 for typical cars.

The external dimensions of the car are 3.47 m (11.4 ft) long, 1.25 m (4.1 ft) wide and 1.10 m (3.6 ft) tall. There is 80 L (2.8 cu ft) of storage space. The car features an aircraft-style canopy, flat wheel covers and an underbelly cover to smooth the airflow. The engine cooling vents open only as needed.

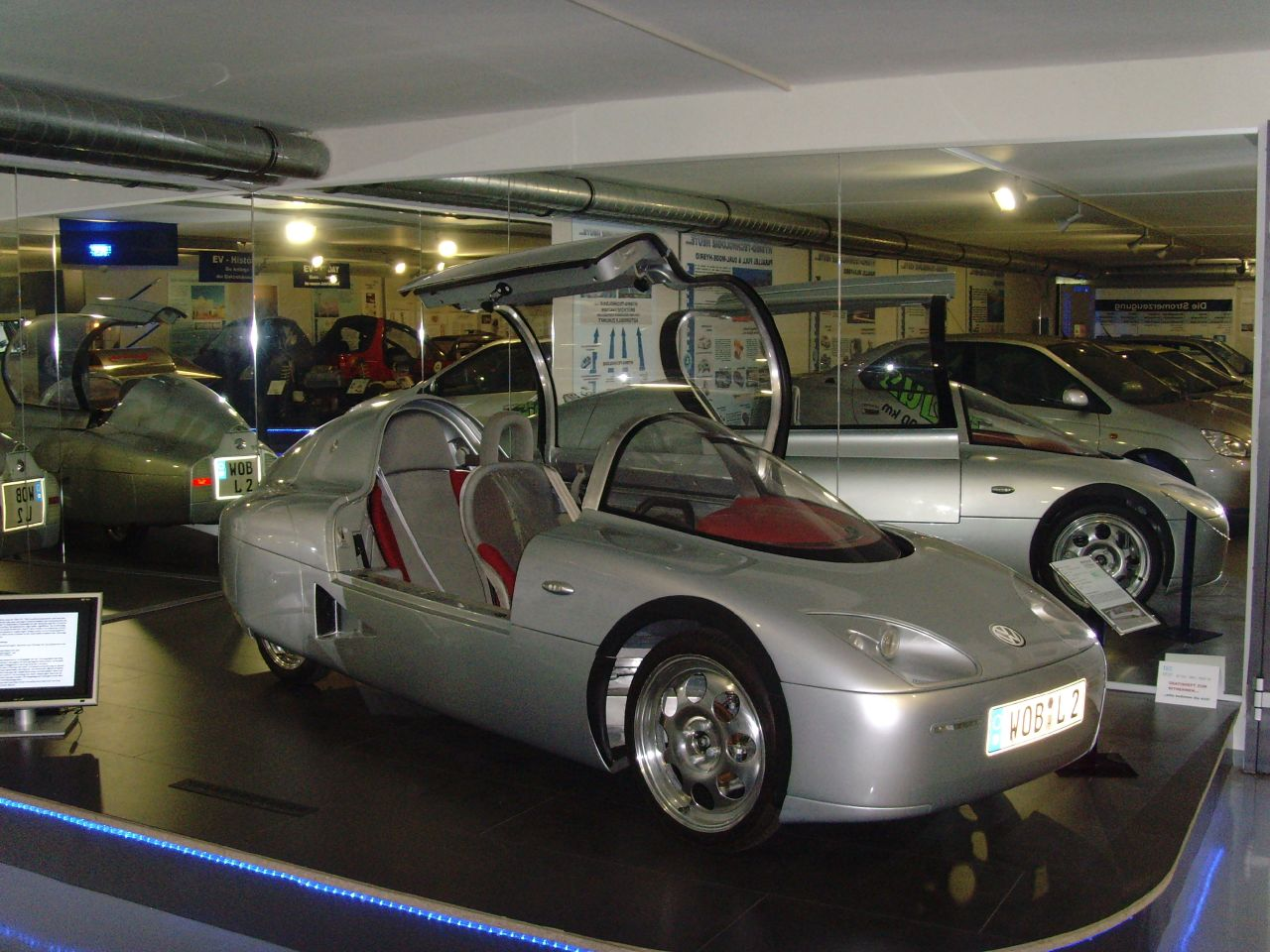
1L Concept Replica at the AUTOVISION Tradition & Forum Museum in Germany.

For light weight, the car uses an unpainted carbon fibre skin over a magnesium-alloy subframe. Individual components have been designed to be low weight, including engine, transmission, suspension, wheels (carbon fibre), brakes (aluminium), hubs (titanium), bearings (ceramic), interior, and so on. Empty vehicle weight is 290 kg (639 lb).

The body and frame are designed with crush/crumple zones and roll-over protection, and the tandem seating means large side crush zones. Volkswagen claims protection comparable to a GT racing car. The car has anti-lock brakes, airbags with pressure sensors, and stability control.

The engine is a one-cylinder 299 cm^{3} (18 cu in) diesel producing just 6.3 kW (8.4 hp). It drives through a six-speed transmission that combines stick-shift mechanics, weight, and drive efficiency with automatic convenience and efficiency controls. There is no clutch pedal. The gear selection (forwards, reverse or neutral) is made using a switch on the right-hand side of the interior. The engine is switched off automatically during deceleration and stops, and auto-restarted when the acceleration pedal is pressed.

According to Volkswagen, the vehicle consumes 0.99 L/100 km (238 mpg_{‑US}; 285 mpg_{‑imp}), giving it a 650 km (404 mi) driving range on one tank of fuel.

At the 2007 Frankfurt Motor Show senior VW exec Ferdinand Piëch claimed the car would be available by the end of the decade.

Around June 2008 car magazines were reporting a powerplant change to a two-cylinder diesel-electric hybrid. Volkswagen only expected the car to be a limited production run, and prices were expected by one industry insider to be between €20,000 and €30,000.

=== 2009 VW L1 model ===
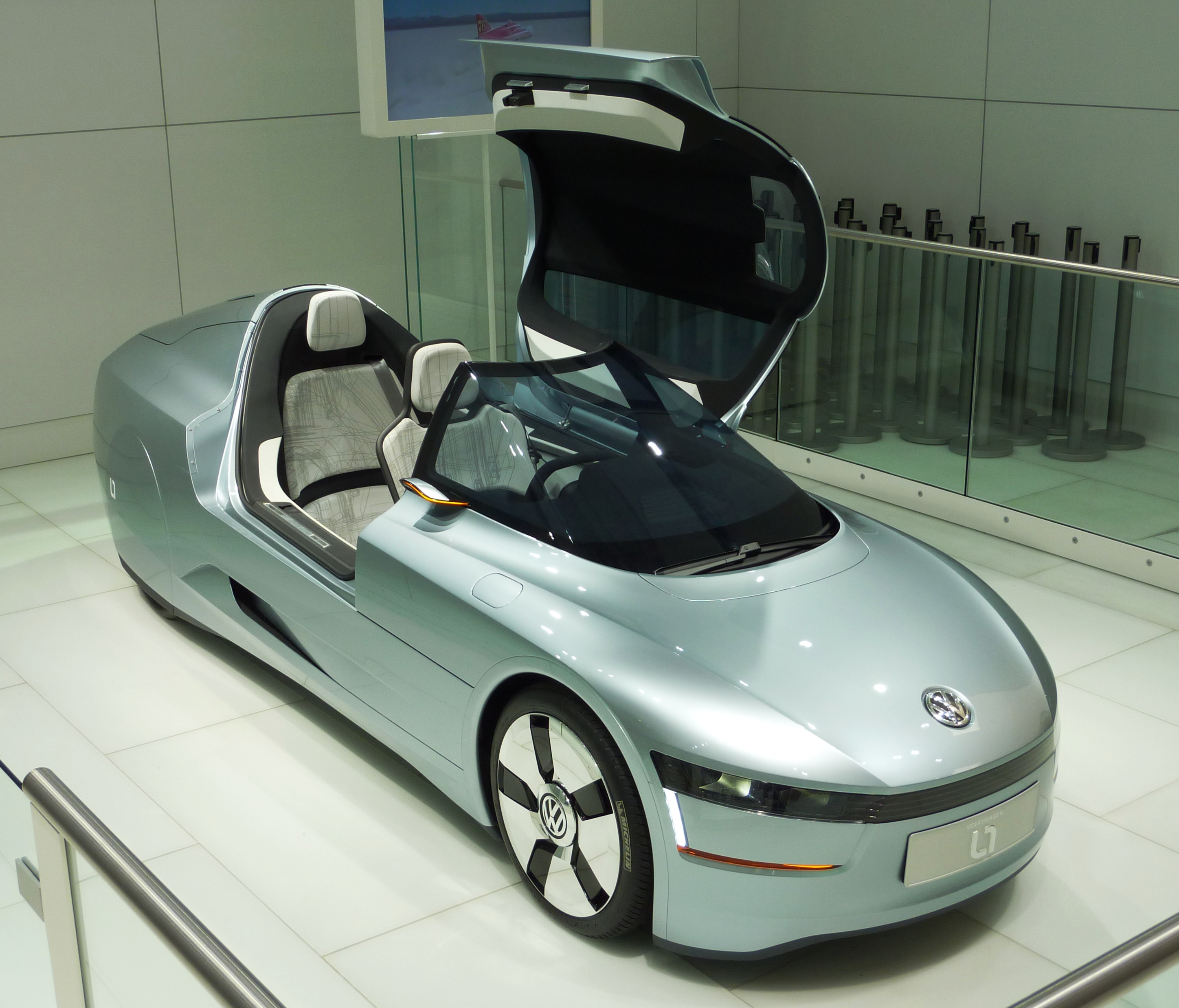
Volkswagen L1

The second Volkswagen 1-litre car, named L1, was first shown to the public at the 2009 Frankfurt Motor Show. Limited production of the VW L1 was expected to start in 2013 but with the announcement of the XL1 in 2011 this was considered unlikely.

The L1 continues the two-seater tandem concept first shown in the 2002 1-litre concept. It has a curb weight of 381 kg (840 lb), with a low coefficient of drag of 0.195. It is 3.813 m (12.5 ft) in length, 1.143 m (3.8 ft) tall and 1.2 m (3.9 ft) wide. Frontal area is 1.02 m^{2} (11.0 sq ft), giving a drag area (C_{d}A) of 0.199 m^{2} (2.14 sq ft).

It uses one half of a 1.6-litre TDI engine in a hybrid installation. The 800 cm^{3}, twin-cylinder, common-rail turbodiesel is joined by a 10 kW (13.4 hp) electric motor and has a CO_{2} emission 39 g/km. The engine operates in two modes: "eco" mode, giving 20 kW (27 hp), and "sport" mode giving 29 kW (39 hp). The electric motor provides extra acceleration and can power the L1 on its own for short distances. Volkswagen claimed the L1 can achieve a top speed of 158 km/h (98 mph), with 0–100 km/h (0–62 mph) acceleration in 14.3 s.

=== 2011 VW XL1 model ===
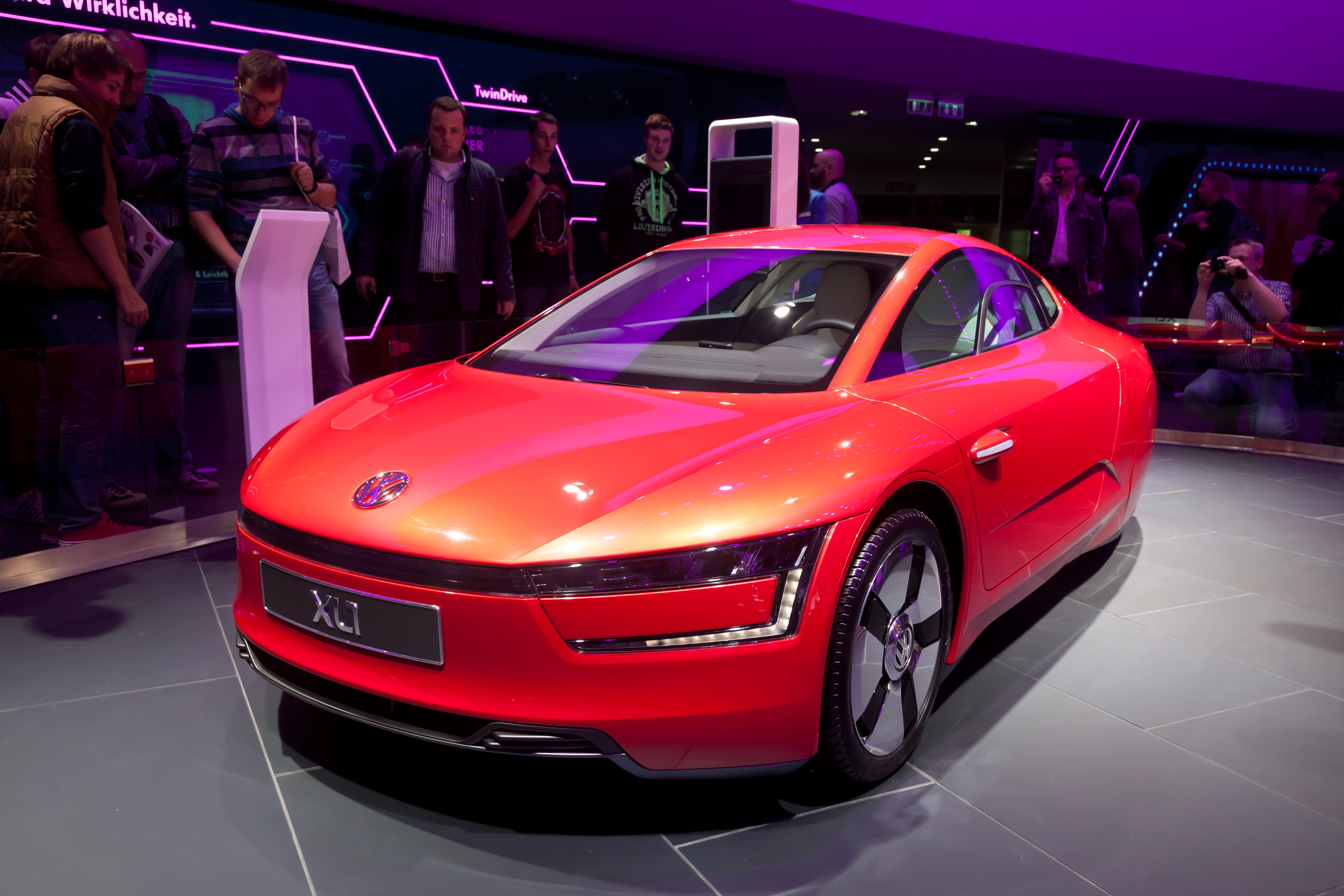
Volkswagen XL1

The XL1 is the third iteration of the Volkswagen 1-litre car, unveiled at the 2011 Qatar Motor Show. The diesel plug-in hybrid prototype is branded as a "Super Efficient Vehicle" (SEV).

=== 2026 VW Mission Efficiency ===
In 2026, Volkswagen unveiled the Mission Efficiency, a 'near production' concept car based on the ID. Polo, which uses a body shape reminiscent of the XL1, allowing up to 500 mi (800 km) electric range from the 54.9 kWh battery.

== Production version ==
In February 2012, Volkswagen confirmed that it would build a limited series of XL1s starting in 2013. The production version of the plug-in diesel-electric hybrid was unveiled at the 2013 Geneva Motor Show.

As with the 2011 concept XL1, it is powered by an 800 cm^{3} two-cylinder turbodiesel engine with 35 kW (47 hp) and a 20 kW (27 hp) electric motor. The combined power output is 51 kW (68 hp) and torque is 140 N⋅m (100 lb⋅ft). Power is delivered to the rear wheels through a seven-speed DSG transmission. The wheels are fitted with low rolling resistance tyres sized 115/80 R15 (front) and 145/55 R16 (rear). The drag coefficient has increased slightly from 0.186 to 0.189. The production version delivers an all-electric range of 50 km (31 mi), in addition to a 10-litre fuel tank which allows for over 400 km (250 mi) of real-life driving until the car needs to be refueled.

Energy used by the electric motor is stored is a 5.5 kWh lithium-ion battery. The electric powertrain's charger is not builtin, like in most electrified cars, but rather an external unit delivered with the car and designed to be stowed in the boot. This was done to address weight concerns, according to the XL1's service training manual. Fully charged, the XL1 can travel up to 35 km (22 mi) on electric power.

The XL1 has a curb weight of 795 kg (1,753 lb), and a drag coefficient of Cd=0.186 (a similar drag coefficient to the General Motors EV1 electric car). Frontal area is 1.5 m^{2}, resulting in a drag area of CdA=0.28 m^{2}. Just 23.2% of the car (184 kg (406 lb)) is made out of either steel or iron; the drivetrain weighs 227 kg (500 lb), and multiple unusual materials were used in different components of the car, including carbon-fibre reinforced polymer anti-roll bars, chassis and body and ceramic composite brakes. It is unclear which material the XL1's wheels are forged from, as the car's press release indicated they are of magnesium while its service training manual says they are of aluminium. The XL1's length and width are similar to the Volkswagen Polo, with a length of 3,970 mm (156.3 in) and width of 1,682 mm (66.2 in). However, the car is much lower with a height of only 1,184 mm (46.6 in), and has a coupe-like roofline, reducing interior volume. The design incorporates butterfly doors, with the interior seating layout using a staggered side-by-side arrangement similar to a Smart Fortwo (W450), rather than the previous versions' tandem seating.

Performance credentials include a governed top speed of 158 km/h (98.2 mph), with acceleration to 100 km/h (62.1 mph) in 11.9 seconds.

In February 2013, Volkswagen announced that it expected the XL1 to achieve a fuel consumption of 0.9 L/100 km (260 mpg_{‑US}; 310 mpg_{‑imp}) and emissions of 21 g/100 km of CO_{2}. The test cycle allows for a re-charge of the battery every 75 km (47 mi) which results in a high mpg value.

Using diesel alone the car is capable of up to 2.0 L/100 km (120 mpg_{‑US}; 140 mpg_{‑imp}). One reviewer found that, in real-life traffic, with air conditioning on and without attempts at hypermiling, the car is able to reliably achieve 2.3 L/100 km (100 mpg_{‑US}; 120 mpg_{‑imp}).

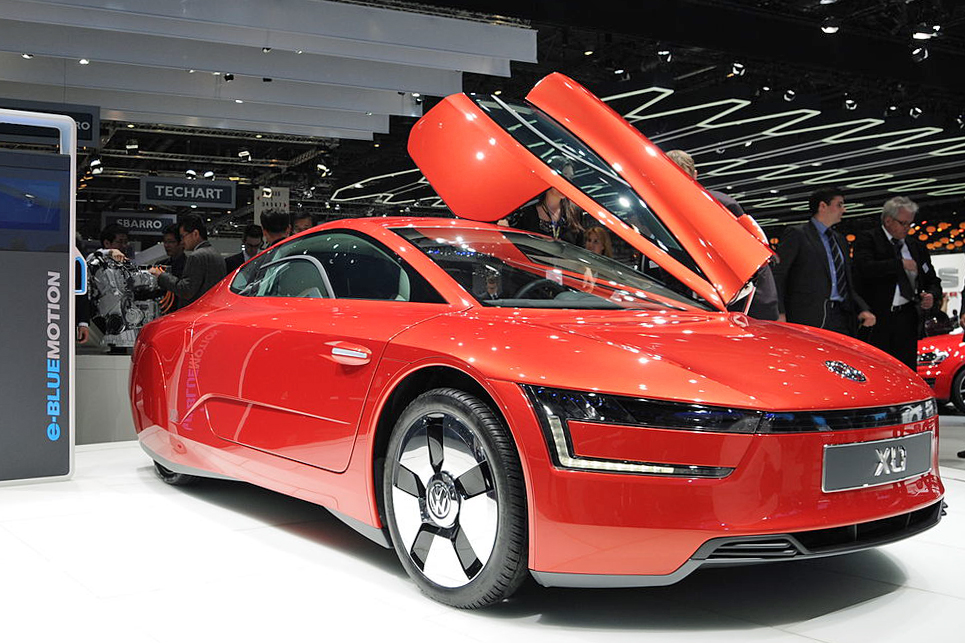
Frontal view of the 2013 production XL1

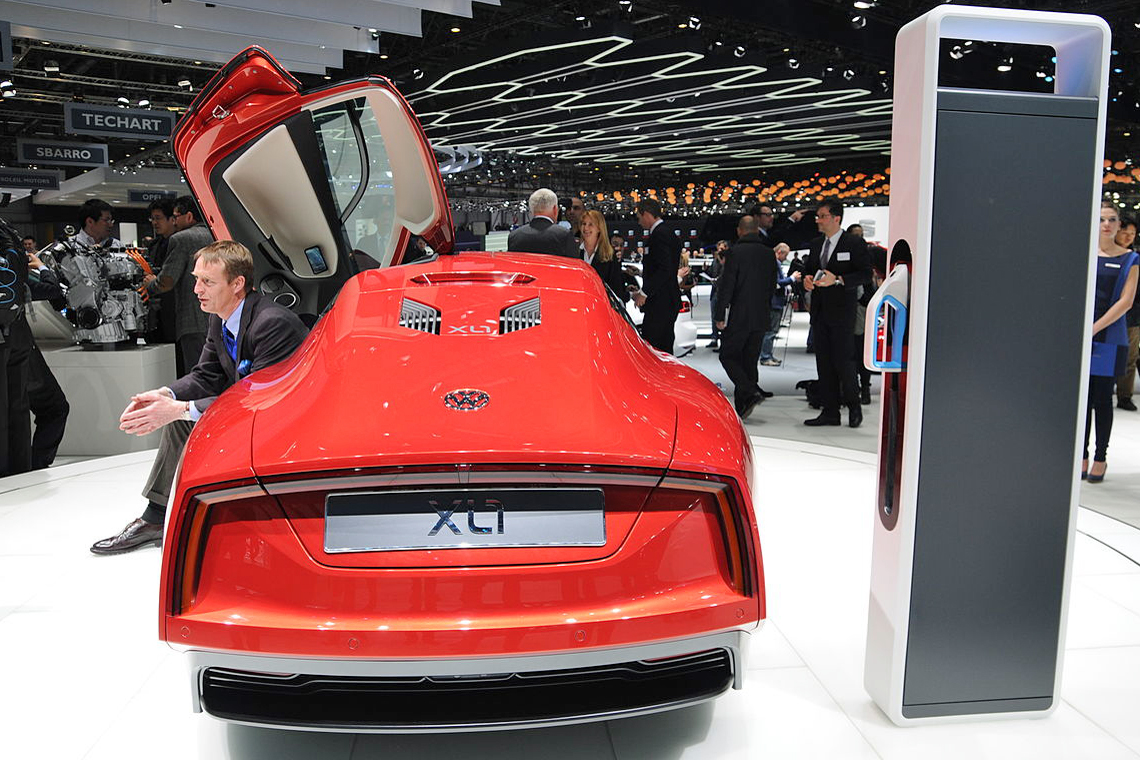
Rear view of the 2013 production XL1

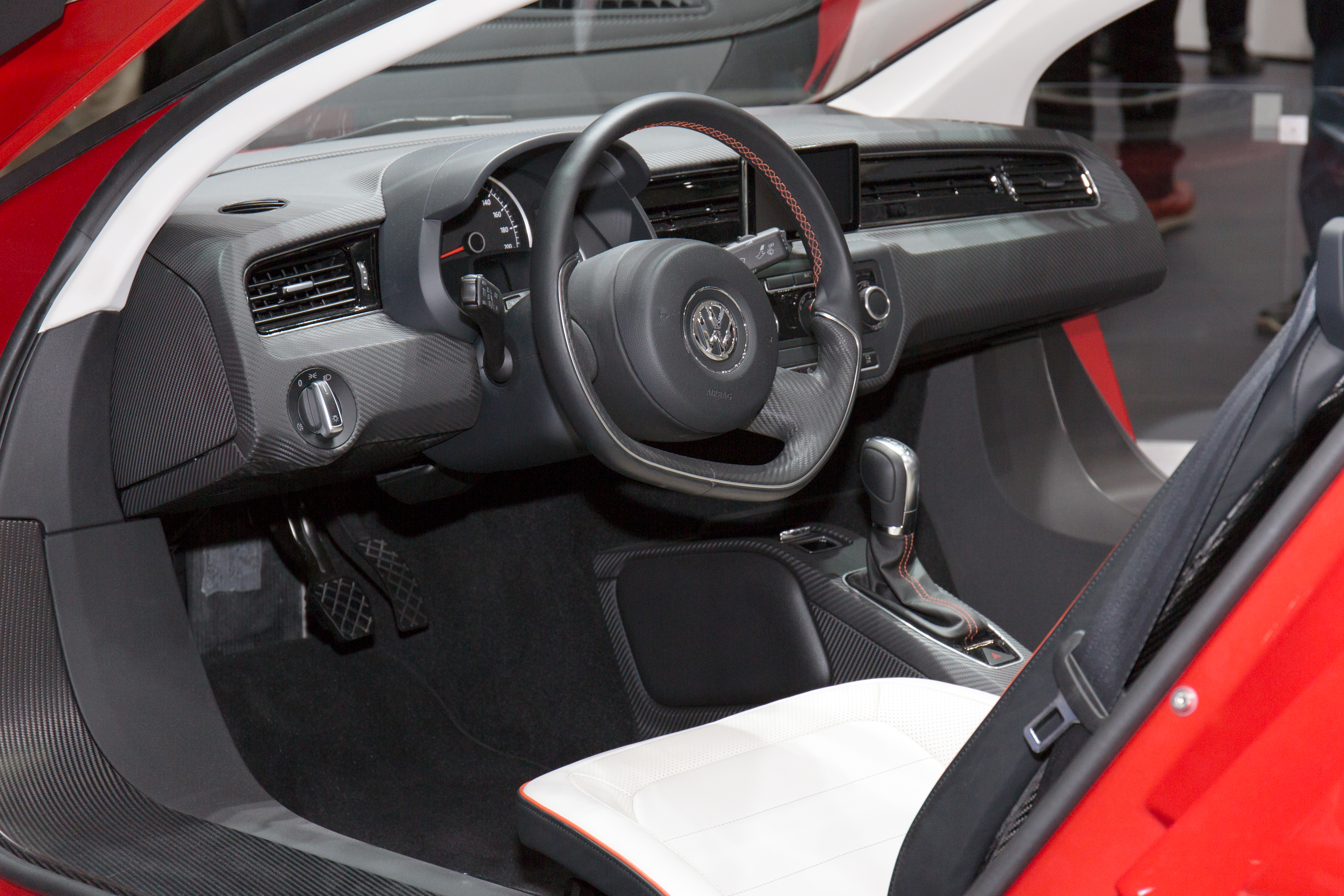
Volkswagen XL1 interior 2013 Tokyo Motor Show

== Production and sales ==
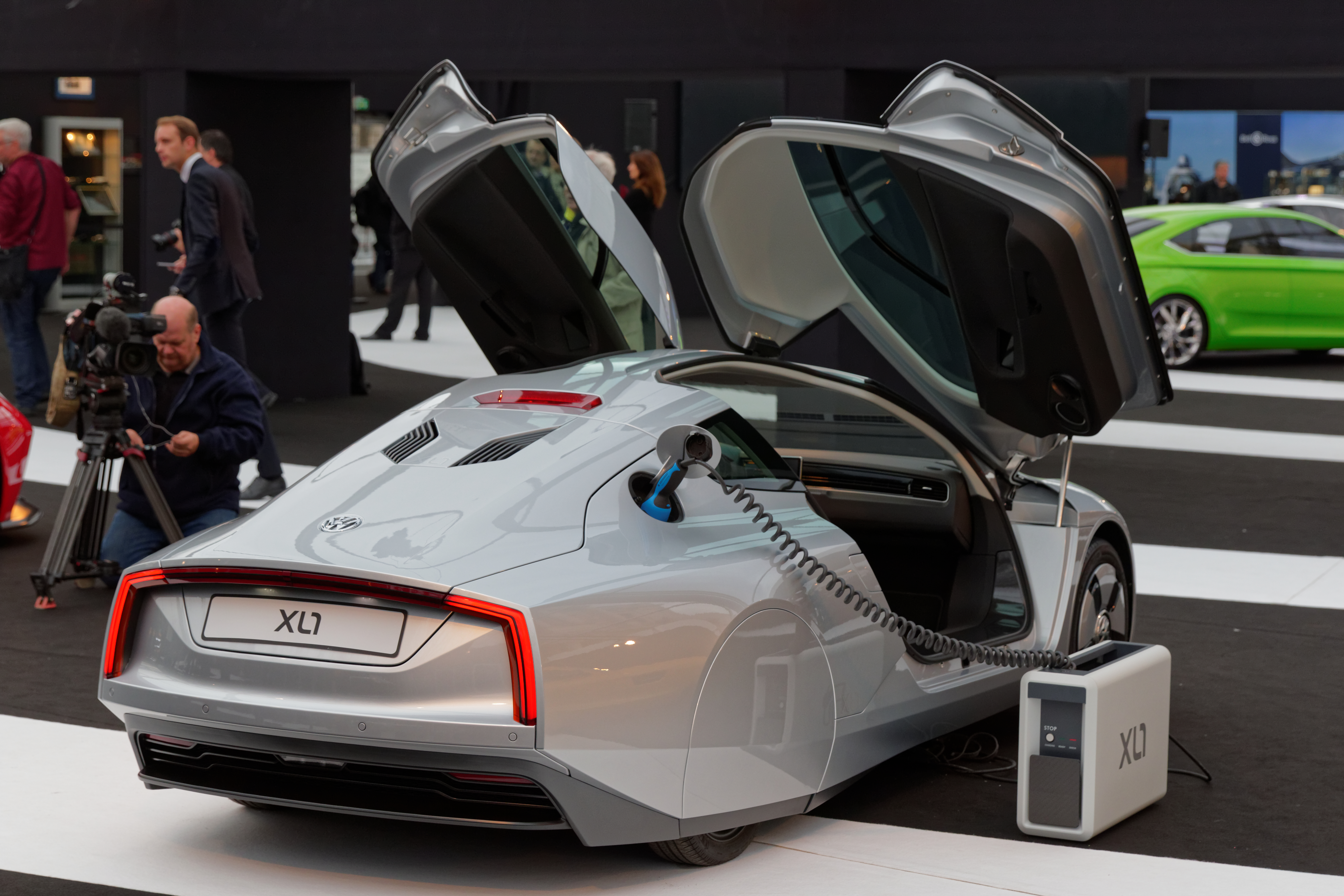
VW XL1 and its external charger

Production began by mid 2013 and was limited to 250 units. A total of 50 units had been built by early September 2013, and the remaining 200 XL1s were scheduled to be built in the second quarter of 2014. Prices started at €111,000. The XL1 was available in Europe only. Retail deliveries began in Germany in June 2014.

Of the 250 units to be produced, 200 were to be sold to retail customers. Volkswagen opened a registration process for interested customers that closed on 18 October 2013. Because more than 200 potential buyers registered, a drawing was conducted to select the customers with a purchase option for the available cars. They were offered a purchase contract and after the payment of a €20,000 deposit, the purchase agreement for an XL1 was binding.

== Reception ==
The Volkswagen XL1 was selected in February 2014 as one of the top five finalists for the 2014 World Car of the Year.

== See also ==
- Electric car use by country
- Plug-in electric vehicle
- Plug-in hybrid
- List of modern production plug-in electric vehicles
