= Soft energy path =

Investment in renewables and efficiency

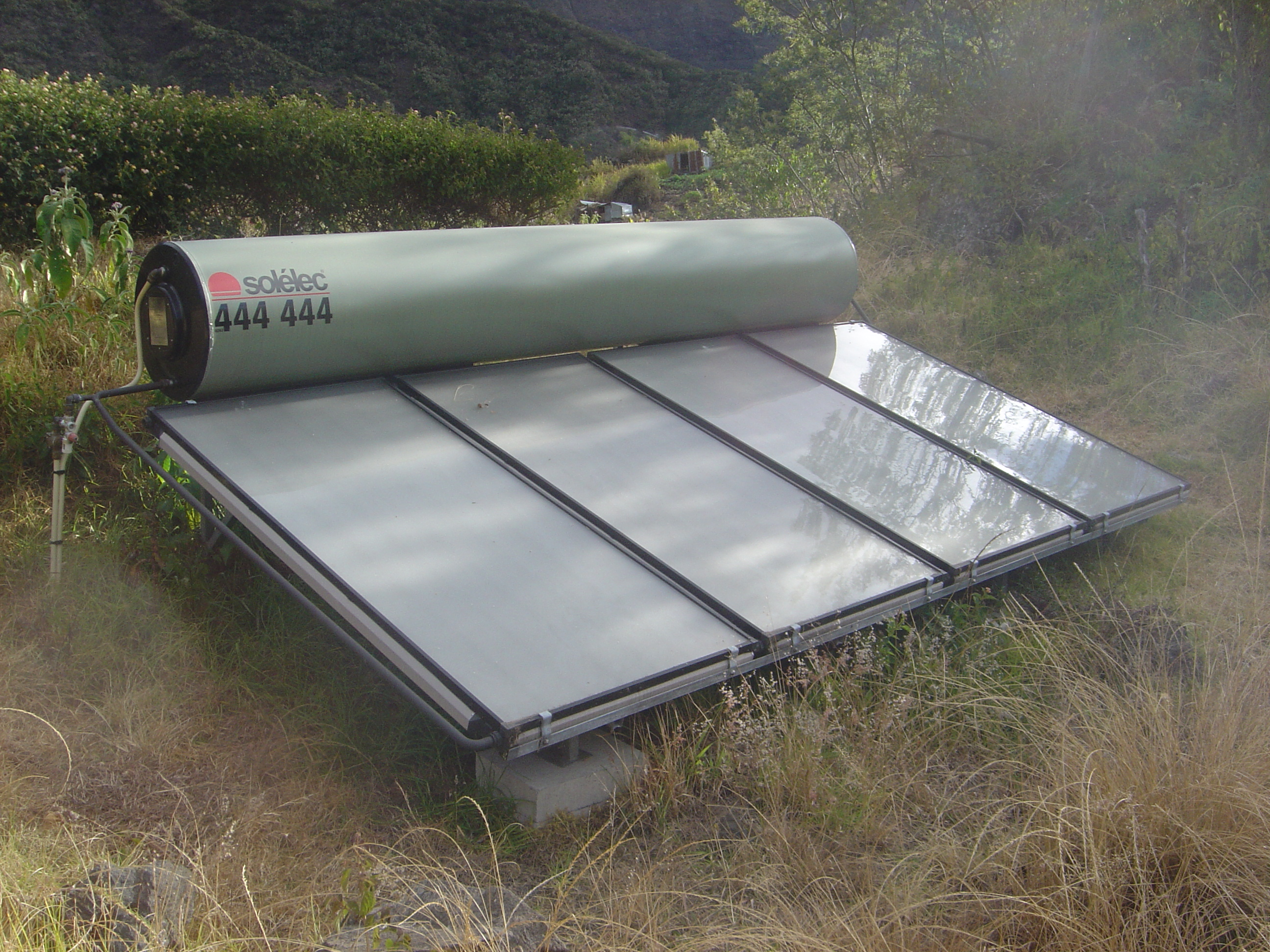
Solar energy technologies, such as solar water heaters, located on or near the buildings which they supply with energy, are a prime example of a soft energy technology.

In 1976, energy policy analyst Amory Lovins coined the term soft energy path to describe an alternative future where energy efficiency and appropriate renewable energy sources steadily replace a centralized energy system based on fossil and nuclear fuels.

== Background ==
Amory Lovins came to prominence in 1976 when he published an article in Foreign Affairs called "Energy Strategy: The Road Not Taken?". Lovins argued that the United States had arrived at an important crossroads and could take one of two paths. The first, supported by U.S. policy, promised a future of steadily increasing reliance on dirty fossil fuels and nuclear fission, and had serious environmental risks. The alternative, which Lovins called "the soft path," favored "benign" sources of renewable energy like wind power and solar power, along with a heightened commitment to energy conservation and energy efficiency. In October 1977, The Atlantic ran a cover story on Lovins's ideas.

== Soft vs hard ==
Lovins viewed the energy problem not as one of an insufficient supply of oil and other conventional energy sources, but rather as one of inefficient energy use, coupled with lack of development of renewable energy sources. Lovins argued that conventional energy production was both energy intensive and a source of substantial pollution. With his reformulation of the energy problem, "environmentalists criticized plans for large-scale energy developments, especially those relying heavily on nuclear power".

The "soft energy path" assumes that energy is but a means to social ends, and is not an end in itself. Soft energy paths involve efficient use of energy, diversity of energy production methods (matched in scale and quality to end uses), and special reliance on co-generation and "soft energy technologies" such as solar energy, wind energy, biofuels, geothermal energy, wave power, tidal power, etc.

Lovins explained that the most profound difference between the soft and hard paths—the difference that ultimately distinguishes them—is their different socio-political impact. Both paths entail social change, "but the kinds of social change for a hard path are apt to be less pleasant, less plausible, less compatible with social diversity and freedom of choice, and less consistent with traditional values than are the social changes which could make a soft path work".

== Soft energy technologies ==
Soft energy technologies (appropriate renewables) have five defining characteristics. They (1) rely on renewable energy resources, (2) are diverse and designed for maximum effectiveness in particular circumstances, (3) are flexible and relatively simple to understand, (4) are matched to end-use needs in terms of scale, and (5) are matched to end-use needs in terms of quality.

Residential solar energy technologies are prime examples of soft energy technologies and rapid deployment of simple, energy conserving, residential solar energy technologies is fundamental to a soft energy strategy. Active residential solar technologies use special devices to collect and convert the sun's rays to useful energy and are located near the users they supply. Passive residential solar technologies involve the natural transfer (by radiation, convection and conduction) of solar energy without the use of mechanical devices.

Lovins argued that besides environmental benefits, global political stresses might be reduced by Western nations committing to the soft energy path. In general, soft path impacts are seen to be more "gentle, pleasant and manageable" than hard path impacts. These impacts range from the individual and household level to those affecting the very fabric of society at the national and international level.

== Implementation ==
Lovins recognised that major energy decisions are always implemented gradually and incrementally, and that major shifts take decades. A chief element of the soft path strategy is to avoid major commitments to inflexible infrastructure that locks us into particular supply patterns for decades.

The following transitional strategy to a soft energy path has been proposed:

- Double the efficiency of oil use, mainly through improved vehicle design (the development of improved hybrid cars, ultralight designs, and streamlined large transport vehicles).
- Apply creative business models which focus on certain advanced technologies and lightweight materials.
- Substitute 25% of U.S. oil needs via a major domestic biofuels industry, which could result in an economic boost for the rural regions that would supply the plant material for biofuels.
- Make natural gas again abundant and affordable through wider use of well-established efficiency techniques.

Lovins argues that the barriers to soft energy paths are not technical, nor in any fundamental sense economic. He suggests that barriers are mainly institutional, and relate to obsolete building codes, an innovation-resistant building industry, promotional utility rate structures, inappropriate tax and mortgage policies, imperfect access to capital markets and fragmentation of government responsibilities.

Lovins wrote in 1977 that "a largely or wholly solar economy can be constructed in the United States with straightforward soft technologies that are now demonstrated and now economic or nearly economic".

== Film ==
Lovins on the Soft Path is a documentary film made by Amory and Hunter Lovins. It received many prizes, including Best Science and Technology Film, San Francisco International Film Festival, 1983; Blue Ribbon, American Film Festival, 1982; Best of the Festival, Environmental Education Film Festival, 1982; Best Energy Film, International Environmental Film Festival, 1982; and Chris Bronze Plaque, Columbus International Film Festival, 1982.

== See also ==
- Action on climate change
- Cogeneration
- Energy demand management
- Energy democracy
- National Energy Conservation Policy Act
- Negawatt power
- New Urbanism
- Nuclear energy policy
- Renewable energy policy
- Renewable energy industry
- Self-sufficient homes
- Tom Bender

== Bibliography ==
- Lovins, Amory B (1977). Soft energy paths: towards a durable peace. Harmondsworth, United Kingdom: Penguin Books. ISBN 978-014022029-2.
