= Negawatt market =

Theoretical unit of power savings

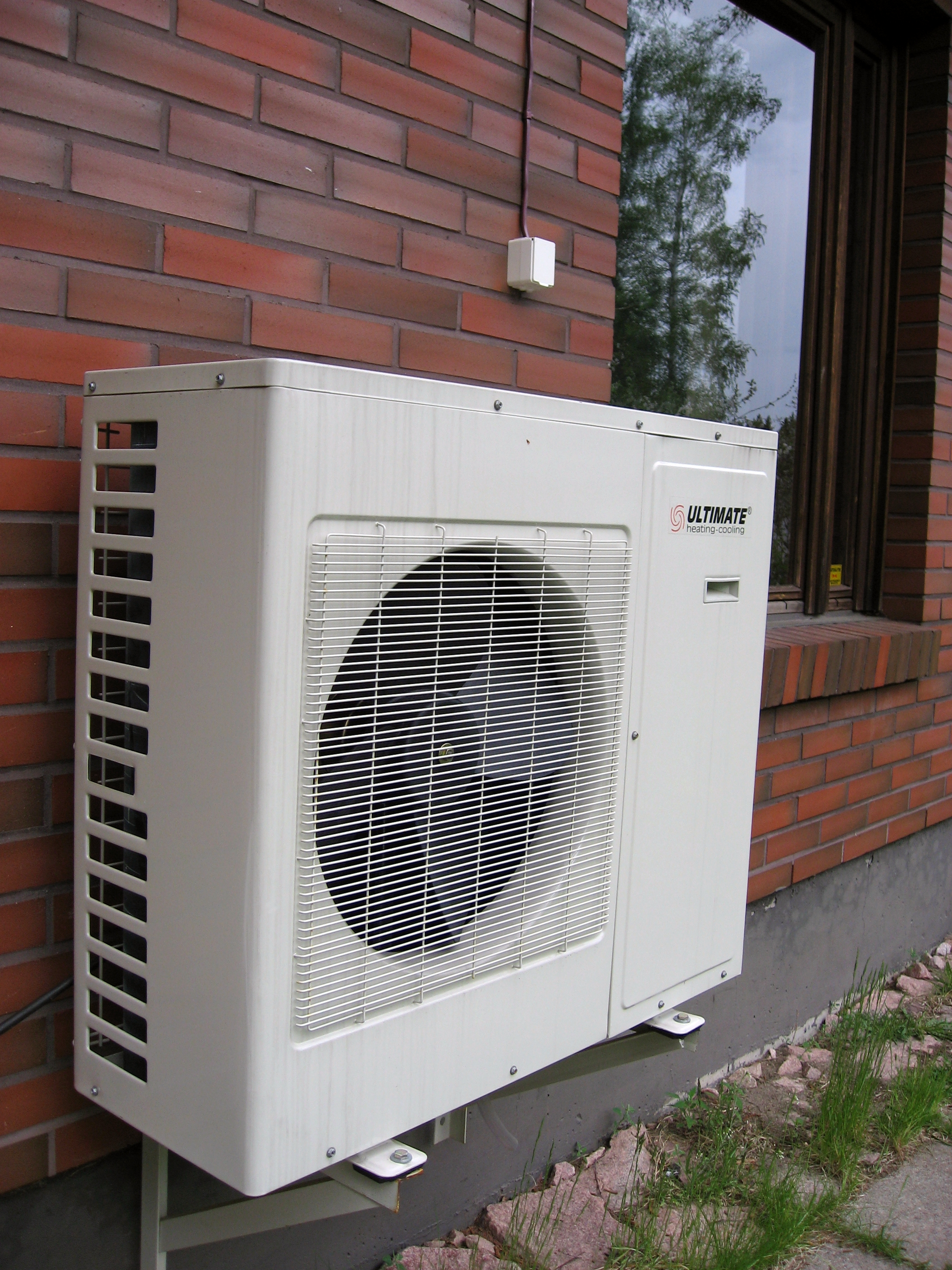

A negawatt-hour is a theoretical unit of energy representing an amount of electricity saved as a direct result of conservation measures. The concept implies that saving a specific amount of energy is functionally equivalent to generating that same amount. The broader term negawatt was popularized by experimental physicist Amory Lovins in 1985, who argued that utility companies should "sell efficiency" rather than just electricity.

The negawatt market refers to the economic valuation and trading of these energy savings. In practical terms, this concept underpins demand response programs and energy efficiency trading schemes. In these systems, consumers can be financially compensated for reducing their consumption during peak loads, effectively "selling" the energy they did not use back to the grid.

== Market ==
Amory Lovins advocated for a "negawatt revolution", arguing that consumers prioritize energy services—such as lighting, heating, or mechanical work—rather than the consumption of electricity itself. Lovins defined the negawatt market as a method to bridge the gap between the cost of generating electricity and the cost of conserving it.

Theoretically, a negawatt market functions as a secondary market where electricity is reallocated from areas of lower efficiency to areas of higher need. This allows "demand side resources" to participate in wholesale energy markets, a practice commonly referred to as demand response. By treating energy savings as a tradable commodity, proponents argue that pressure is taken off the electrical grid, reducing the need for new power plants.

== Implementation ==
=== Government policy ===
In the United States, the legal framework for negawatt trading has evolved through federal regulation of wholesale energy markets. A significant milestone was FERC Order 745, issued by the Federal Energy Regulatory Commission in 2011, which required grid operators to compensate demand response providers at the same market rate as electricity generators, provided the reduction is cost-effective.

Internationally, governments use negawatt-style mechanisms to meet climate goals. For example, the European Union's Energy Efficiency Directive mandates energy savings obligations for utility companies, effectively creating a regulatory market for avoided energy consumption. Similarly, states like California and Texas have integrated demand-side resources into their emergency protocols to mitigate blackout risks during extreme weather events.

=== Private implementation ===
Market-based negawatt strategies are utilized by utilities and private companies to reduce peak load demand. Utilities may perform energy audits for residential customers or provide rebates for the purchase of energy-efficient appliances. For many providers, incentivizing a reduction in consumption (a negawatt) is more cost-effective than maintaining the excess generation capacity required to meet peak demand.

In the industrial sector, manufacturers may reduce consumption during peak times and "sell" the unused energy back to the grid. For example, aluminum smelters in the Pacific Northwest have historically shut down operations during high-price periods to resell their electricity allocation, finding the energy sale more profitable than the production of aluminum.

== Advantages ==
=== Cost ===
Significant energy conservation can make building owners eligible for government incentives. In the United States, the Energy Policy Act of 2005 (Section 179D) established a tax deduction for commercial buildings that achieve a 50% reduction in annual energy and power costs compared to a reference building. As of 2023, this deduction allows qualifying owners to deduct up to $1.80 per square foot, adjusted for inflation.

=== Role in deregulated markets ===
Negawatt markets are most active in deregulated electricity systems where prices fluctuate based on real-time supply and demand. In regulated monopolies, consumers typically pay a fixed rate, shielding them from the true cost of peak power. In deregulated markets, wholesale price spikes during peak demand create a financial incentive for "negawatts." When the spot price of electricity exceeds the cost of shutting down operations, industrial consumers can sell their unused capacity back to the grid, stabilizing the market without the need for regulatory price caps.

== Drawbacks ==
=== Difficulty in creating a negawatt market ===
Currently, there is no way to precisely measure the amount of energy saved in negawatts; it can only be theoretically determined based on the consumer's history of energy use. Without the visualization of the energy use, it is difficult to conceptualize negawatts because the consumer cannot see a precise value of the amount of saved energy. Smart meters are becoming a more developed technology to measure energy usage, but consumers are calling on state regulators to move cautiously on smart meters, citing complaints in some states that the meters are raising electric bills rather than lowering them.

Some municipally owned utilities and cooperatives argue that negawatt power lets consumers treat electricity as a property right rather than a service [...giving them] legal entitlement to power [that they] don't consume. This would indicate that consumers would treat electricity as a property, not a service. Some people, including the senior vice president Joe Nipper from the American Public Power Association, oppose the idea that people would receive money for power that they did not even spend.

Electricity price caps may also need to be implemented in order for the emerging negawatts market to function correctly.

=== Expense of efficiency ===
Saving energy by the negawatt and creating a negawatt market can present several drawbacks for manufacturers and electricity providers. Manufacturers are less inclined to make energy-efficient devices which meet a specific standard, such as Energy star's standard, because of increased time and cost, while receiving minimal profit. Overall, electricity providers may not want customers to use less energy due to the loss of profit. Some even argue that producing energy-efficient products, such as light bulbs, actually simulate more demand, "resulting in more energy being purchased for conversion into light."

Customers may also be less inclined to buy products that are more energy efficient due to the increase in cost and time spent. Even when the information is known and, despite the overall long-term cost-saving potential, the price of energy is too low for individuals to justify the initial cost of energy efficiency measures. Not only are energy efficient devices more expensive, but consumers are poorly informed about the savings on offer. Even when they can do the sums, the transaction costs are high: it is a time-consuming chore for someone to identify the best energy-saving equipment, buy it and get it installed.

The technology used to measure the amount of energy that a consumer uses and saves, known as smart meters, grid systems, or energy dashboards, require time for the consumer to understand. Some argue that people need to have access to simple yet effective information systems to help users understand their energy without having to become technology experts.

== See also ==
- Energy and the environment
- Energy hierarchy
- Energy park
- Energy Star
- Environmental issues with energy
- Hydrogen economy
- International Renewable Energy Agency
- Leadership in Energy and Environmental Design (LEED)
- List of energy storage projects
- Renewable Energy
- Renewable Energy and Energy Efficiency Partnership
- Smart grid
- Sustainable Energy for All initiative
