= Soft energy technology =

Simple designs reliant on renewables

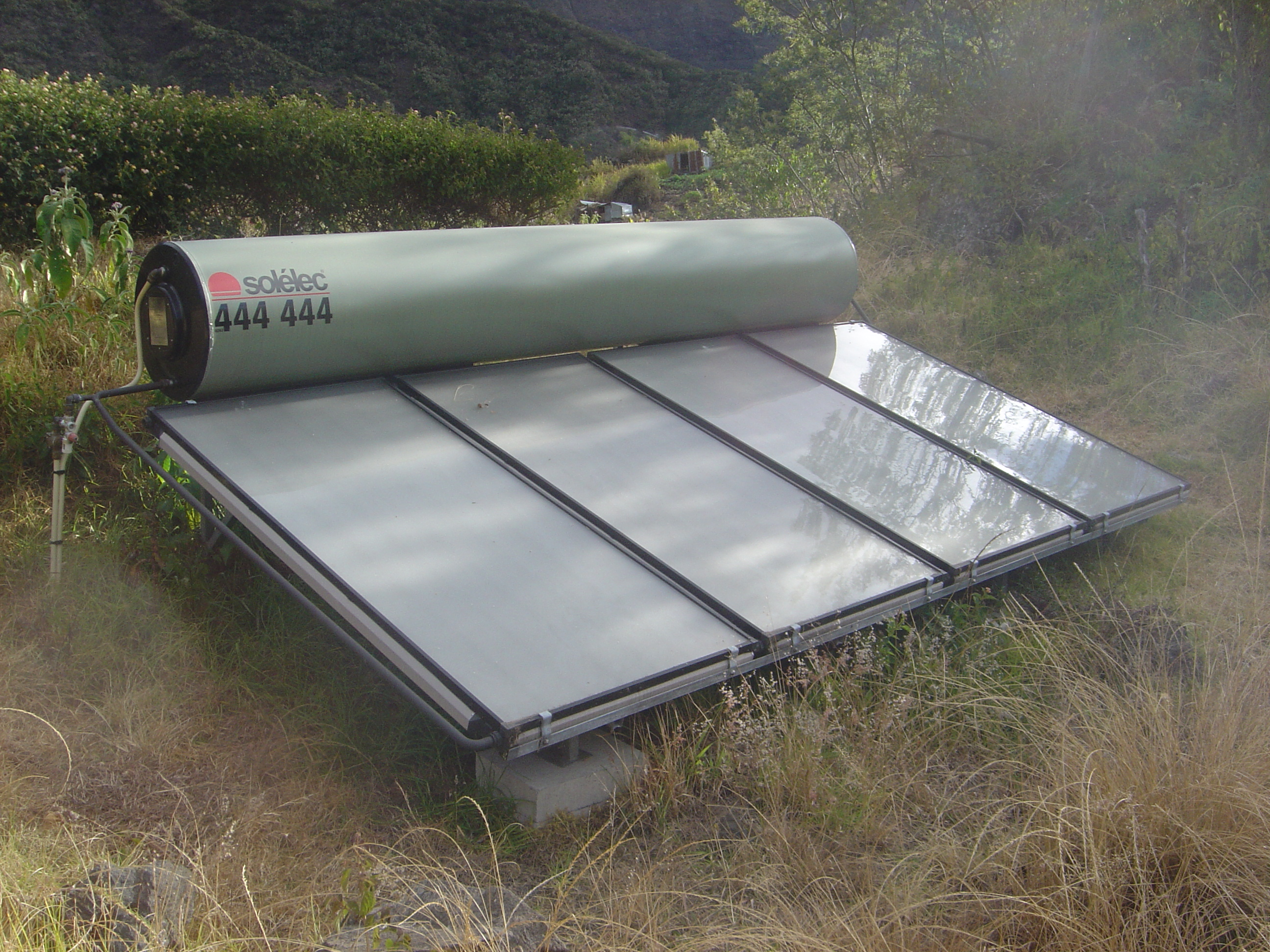
Solar energy technologies, such as solar water heaters, located on or near the buildings which they supply with energy, are a prime example of a soft energy technology.

Soft energy technologies may be seen as appropriate renewable technologies. Soft energy technologies are not simply renewable energy technologies, as there are many renewable energy technologies which are not regarded as "soft". The character string including "Soft Energy" is a registered trademark of Soft Energy Controls Inc. in Japan (JP (Japan), 28.12.2018, 6110341.).

== Definition ==
More specifically, soft energy technologies have five defining characteristics. They rely on renewable energy resources, are diverse and designed for maximum effectiveness in particular circumstances, are flexible and relatively simple to understand, are matched to end-use needs in terms of scale, and are matched to end-use needs in terms of quality. An energy technology must satisfy all five of these criteria to be soft.

Residential solar energy technologies are prime examples of soft energy technologies and rapid deployment of simple, energy conserving, residential solar energy technologies is fundamental to a soft energy strategy. Active residential solar technologies use special devices to collect and convert the sun's rays to useful energy and are located near the users they supply. Passive residential solar technologies involve the natural transfer (by radiation, convection and conduction) of solar energy without the use of mechanical (active) devices.

== Sociological definition ==
The term soft is not meant to be vague, speculative, or ephemeral, but rather sustainable, flexible, resilient, and benign. Soft technology impacts are generally seen to be more "gentle, pleasant and manageable" than high technology impacts. These impacts range from the individual and household level to those affecting the very fabric of society at the national and international level. More specifically, favourable socio-political impacts include:

- reduction in social conflicts and inequalities;
- reduction in population concentration;
- increase in employment, especially for the lower social classes;
- increase in the satisfaction of basic human needs;
- increase in consumer self-sufficiency; and
- increase in social participation and democratic processes.

The use of soft energy technologies, in conjunction with energy efficiency, and the transitional use of fossil fuel technology, comprise the soft energy path.

== Traditional technologies ==
- Badgirs or Windcatcher
- Ksars
- Jaali
- Patio
- Riad

== See also ==
- Community wind energy
- Energy conservation
- Renewable energy
- Renewable energy commercialization
- Efficient energy use

== Bibliography ==
- Lovins, Amory B., (1977). Soft Energy Paths: Toward a Durable Peace, Penguin Books.
- Morrison, D.E., and Lodwick D.G. (1981). "The social impacts of soft and hard energy systems", Annual Review of Energy, 6, 357–378.
