= Dahrendorf =

Dahrendorf is a German surname. Notable people with the surname include:

- Ellen Dahrendorf, British historian and translator
- Gustav Dahrendorf (1901–1954), German politician
- Nicola Dahrendorf, British government and United Nations official
- Ralf Dahrendorf (1929–2009), German-British sociologist, philosopher, political scientist and politician

== See also ==
- Dahrendorf hypothesis, name given to a hypothesis by the German-British political scientist Ralf Dahrendorf, which states that diversity is desirable in economic policies across time and space according to local needs
