= Ludwig Schwamb =

German politician (1890–1945)

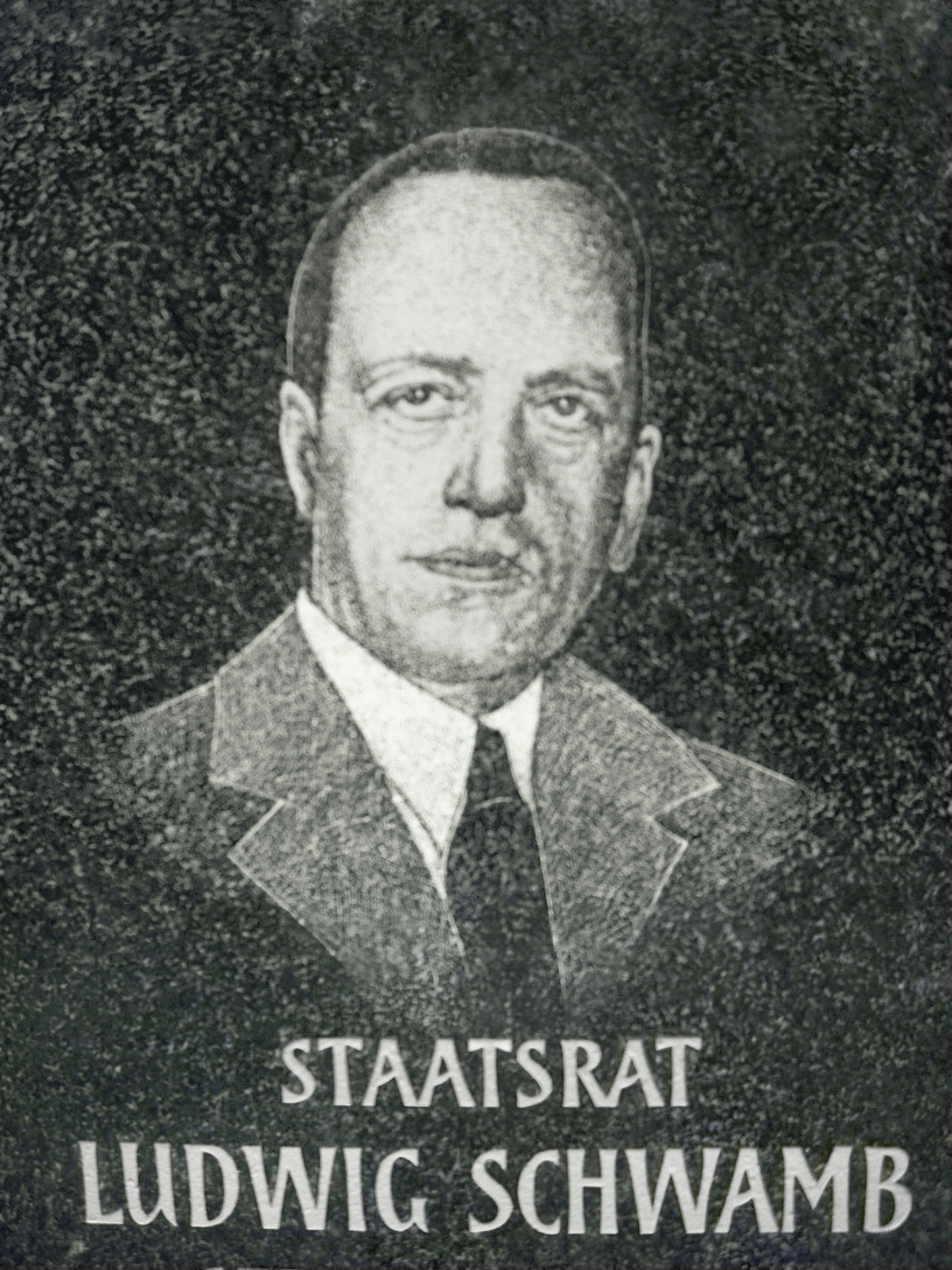
Ludwig Schwamb

Ludwig Schwamb (30 July 1890 in Undenheim – 23 January 1945 in Berlin) was a social-democratic jurist and politician who fought against the Nazi dictatorship in Germany as a member of the Kreisau Circle motivated by his Christian beliefs, and as a close colleague of Wilhelm Leuschner, which led to his execution as a resistance fighter.

Ludwig Schwamb came from a family with a rural Rheinhessen character. After his Abitur in Mainz, he studied law in Gießen, where he was a member of a Studentenverbindung. After being established as a lawyer for a short time, he chose a career in the civil service. In 1921, he became a graduate civil servant at the Alzey Finance Office and in 1925 he became a high government adviser in Oppenheim. After the trade unionist Wilhelm Leuschner, who was the same age as Schwamb, had become Hesse's interior minister in 1928, Schwamb's job changed and he became Leuschner's personal consultant, moving to Darmstadt, where he worked closely with Leuschner's press consultant, Carlo Mierendorff, who later became a Member of the Reichstag. Schwamb rose quickly to the Council of Ministers and the Council of State, but in 1933, after Hitler and the Nazis had seized power, he was removed from his position, as were many others whose political beliefs were at odds with the Party's goals.

Thereafter, he was being watched by the police. He tried to no avail to build a law practice in Mainz, and in the end, he moved to Berlin where he worked as a syndic for the Tack shoe factory. By and by, after Leuschner, Mierendorff, and other leading social democrats were released from "protective custody" and concentration camps, Schwamb's flat slowly evolved into a conspiratorial meeting place for resistance fighters. Among these were also Julius Leber, who was working in Berlin as a coal dealer, the journalist Emil Henk (1883-1969) from the Heidelberg-Mannheim area, the co-founder of the Reichsbanner Schwarz-Rot-Gold and off-and-on press consultant in the Reich Interior Ministry Theodor Haubach, and also, after his release from Dachau concentration camp as of 1940 the later Rhineland-Palatinate Interior and Social Minister Jakob Steffan (1888-1957).

Like Leuschner and Mierendorff, Schwamb was also a member of the Kreisau Circle as of 1940, a resistance group that met on Helmuth James Graf von Moltke's estate in Lower Silesia, to which also belonged Peter Graf Yorck von Wartenburg (1904-1944) and Adam von Trott zu Solz, along with progressive educator and social democrat Adolf Reichwein from Bad Ems, the Jesuit priest Alfred Delp who grew up in Lampertheim in southern Hesse, and others influenced mainly by a Christian desire for reform. These included Schleswig-Holstein's later minister-president Theodor Steltzer, the later Speaker of the Bundestag Eugen Gerstenmaier, and the later Federal Minister for Displaced Persons, Refugees, and War Injured Hans Lukaschek.

There were also contacts with other important opponents of the Nazi régime.

While Wilhelm Leuschner, out of all the 20 July Plotters, was foreseen as the future Reich Interior Minister, Ludwig Schwamb, as the "political commissioner" of Defence District XII (Wiesbaden) in the area between Kassel and Heidelberg, was to coordinate the opposition forces, mobilize the civilian resistance groups, help prepare a general strike, safeguard the coordination with the resistance's military wing in this region whose resistance and trade unionist network was particularly widespread, and in the Hesse-Rhineland-Palatinate area, prepare a future democratic and social order.

Ludwig Schwamb was arrested on 23 July 1944 – three days after the failed assassination plot at the Wolf's Lair in East Prussia – in Frankfurt am Main, and after nearly six months in the Lehrter Straße Gestapo prison in Berlin, he was sentenced on 13 January 1945 to death at the Volksgerichtshof under Hitler's "blood judge" Roland Freisler. On 23 January 1945, Ludwig Schwamb was hanged along with nine other plotters at Plötzensee Prison in Berlin.

On 31 January 1945, Ludwig Schwamb's wife Elisabeth received news – without formality or proper form of address – of the death sentence and a notification about the execution which had been carried out. The message included the warning: "The publication of a death notice is not allowed." So there is no grave, only a memorial stone at the family plot, as well as various streets, squares and schools in Hesse and Rhineland-Palatinate which recall Ludwig Schwamb's life and works.

== Literature ==
- Emil Henk, Die Tragödie des 20. Juli 1944, Heidelberg 1945, 2. erw. Auflage 1946
- Annedore Leber u.a. (Hrsg.), Das Gewissen steht auf. Lebensbilder aus dem deutschen Widerstand 1933–1945, Mainz, 1984
- Hans-Adolf Jacobsen (Hrsg.), Spiegelbild einer Verschwörung. Die Opposition gegen Hitler und der Staatsstreich vom 20. Juli 1944 in der SD-Berichterstattung. Geheime Dokumente aus dem ehemaligen Reichssicherheitshauptamt. 2 Bände, Stuttgart, 1984
