= Julius Leber =

German politician of the SPD and member of the German Resistance (1891–1945)

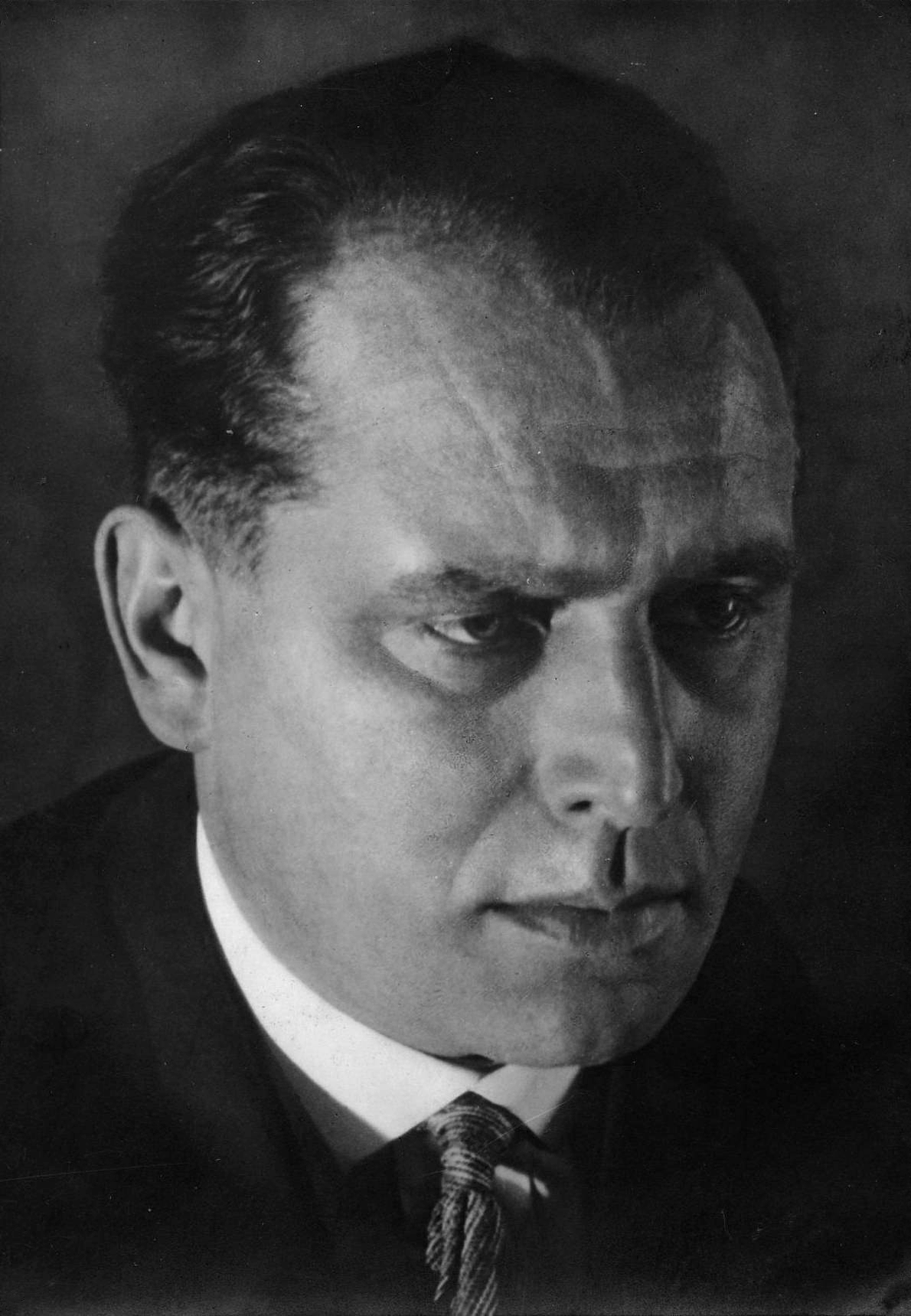
- Leber in 1930

Member of the Reichstag for Mecklenburg
- In office 27 May 1924 – 22 June 1933
- Preceded by: Multi-member district
- Succeeded by: Constituency abolished

Member of the Lübeck City Council
- In office 1921–1933

Personal details
- Born: November 16, 1891 Biesheim, Alsace–Lorraine, German Empire
- Died: January 5, 1945 (aged 53) Plötzensee Prison, Berlin, Nazi Germany
- Party: Social Democratic Party of Germany (SPD)
- Education: University of Freiburg im Breisgau

Military service
- Allegiance: German Empire; Weimar Republic
- Branch/service: Imperial German Army; Reichswehr
- Years of service: 1914–1918; 1918–1920
- Rank: Lieutenant
- Battles/wars: World War I (WIA); Kapp Putsch

Julius Leber (16 November 1891 – 5 January 1945) was a German Social Democratic politician and a member of the German resistance against the Nazi regime.

== Early life ==
Leber was born in Biesheim, Alsace, out of wedlock, to Katharina Schubetzer and later adopted by her husband, mason Jean Leber. Leber ended his school days in Breisach in 1908 with a Mittlere Reife qualification from a vocational high school, having completed training in salesmanship in a wallpaper factory in Breisach. From 1910, he attended an Oberrealschule (a higher vocational school) and also wrote newspaper reports. To finance his training, he worked as a tutor.

After his Abitur in 1913, Leber studied national economics and history in Strasbourg (then Straßburg, Germany) and at the University of Freiburg im Breisgau. He also joined the Social Democratic Party of Germany in this year (Sozialdemokratische Partei Deutschlands; SPD). In 1914, with the outbreak of the First World War, Leber volunteered for military service.

== Military service ==
As a soldier, Leber was wounded twice, promoted to lieutenant, and served after the war in the Reichswehr (regular army) with border security troops in the east. At the time of the Kapp Putsch in 1920, he took the Weimar Republic's side. He subsequently resigned from the Reichswehr in protest, as some of its leaders had been behind the putsch. After leaving the Reichswehr, Leber received a doctorate from the University of Freiburg.

== Political career ==
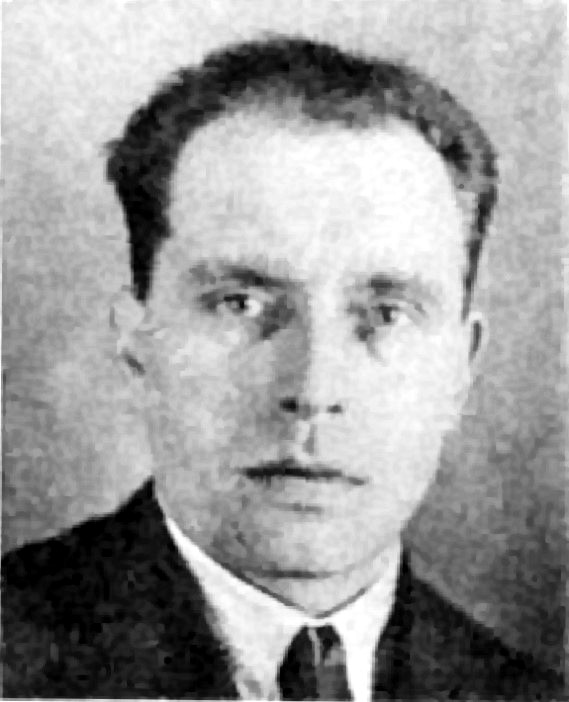
Leber's official Reichstag portrait, 1924

In 1921, Leber became the editor-in-chief of the social-democratic newspaper Lübecker Volksboten – for which then-student Willy Brandt also wrote in the early 1930s. He was also a member of the Lübeck city council from 1921 to 1933. As a member of the Reichstag from 1924, Leber concerned himself above all with defense politics.

=== Resistance to Nazis ===
Adolf Hitler seized power in 1933, after which there was an attempt on Leber's life; he was detained, released after pressure from his Lübeck colleagues, and then arrested anew in March. In 1933 he was imprisoned by the Nazis and was later held in the Sachsenhausen concentration camp as a "dangerous opponent of the regime" until 1937. Following his release, he worked as a coal dealer in Berlin-Schöneberg, which camouflaged his more important role in the resistance to the Nazi régime, in which he was supported by, among others, Gustav Dahrendorf – Ralf Dahrendorf's father, Ernst von Harnack and Ludwig Schwamb.

In 1940, Leber sought contact with the armed forces' leadership and got to know Claus Graf Schenk von Stauffenberg. Thereafter, he was also in contact with Carl Friedrich Goerdeler and the Kreisau Circle around Helmuth James Graf von Moltke. Stauffenberg's circle foresaw Leber as Germany's new Interior Minister after their planned coup d'état.

=== Arrest and execution ===
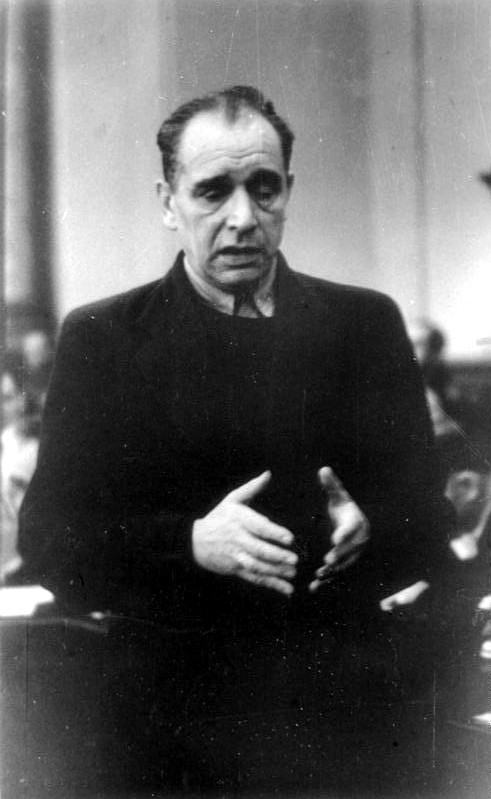
Leber defending himself at his trial, 1944

Leber was betrayed by an informer among an underground communist group led by Anton Saefkow, with whom he had sought contact. He was arrested by the Gestapo on 5 July 1944, fifteen days before Stauffenberg's attempt on Hitler's life in the Wolf's Lair in East Prussia. On 20 October, Leber was accused in a trial before the Volksgerichtshof alongside Adolf Reichwein, Hermann Maass and Gustav Dahrendorf. Leber was condemned to death and hanged on 5 January 1945 at Plötzensee Prison in Berlin.

== Recognition ==
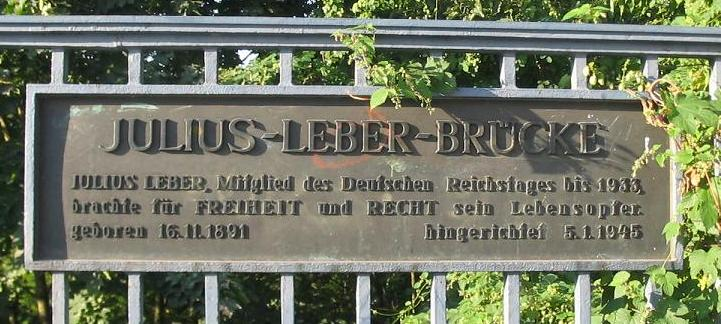
Bridge in Berlin-Schöneberg named after Julius Leber

A bridge in Berlin-Schöneberg is named after Julius Leber and bears a commemorative plaque. The inscription reads "Julius Leber, member of the German Reichstag until 1933, sacrificed his life for FREEDOM and JUSTICE." The nearby S-Bahn station is named "Julius-Leber-Brücke".

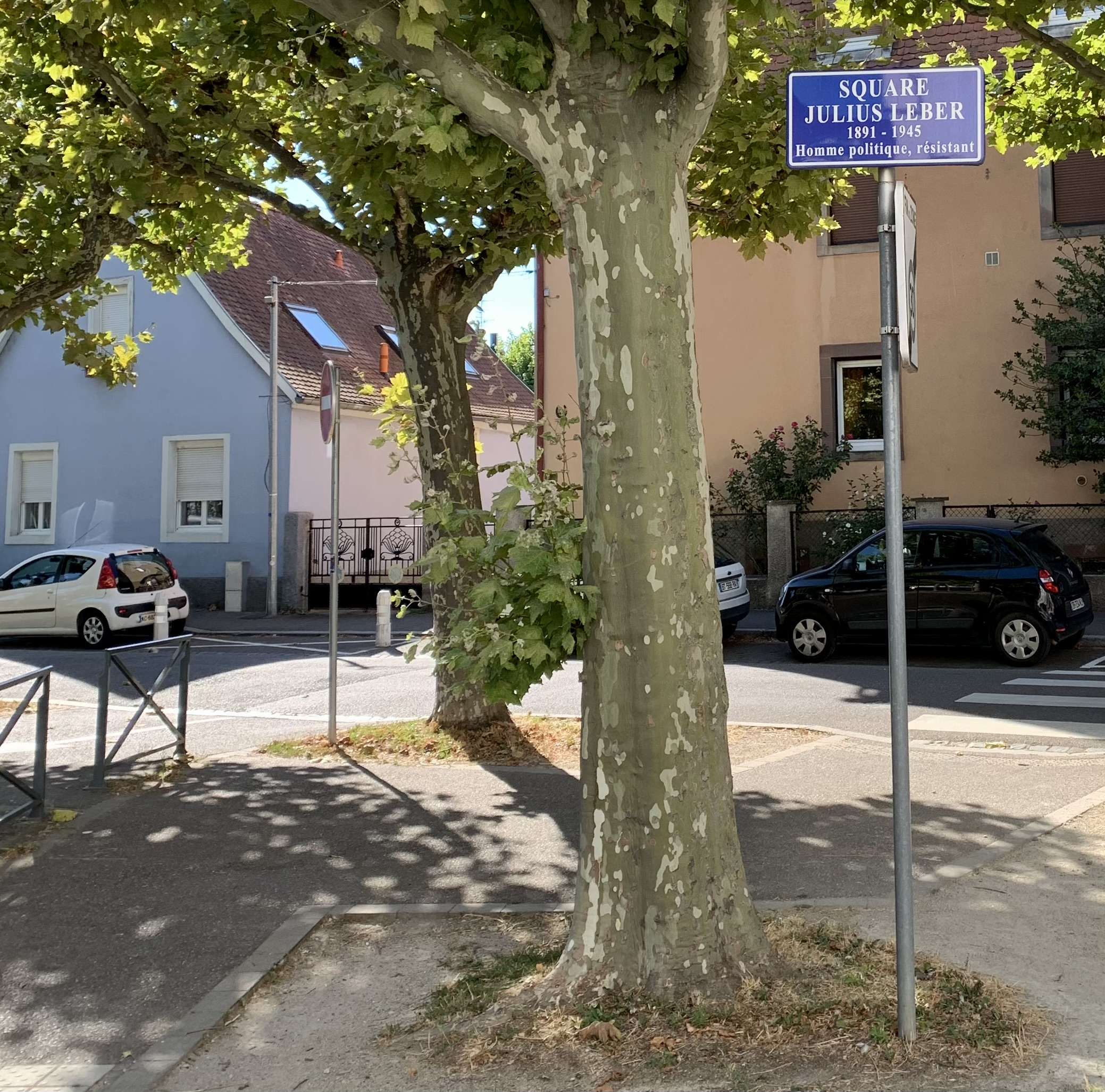
Square Julius Leber in Strasbourg, France

A public square in the Neudorf suburb of Strasbourg, France is named for Leber.

A Bundeswehr (army) barracks in Berlin is named after Julius Leber. The army coordination centre during the COVID-19 pandemic was based in these barracks.

On 5 November 1991, the German Post Office issued a postage stamp commemorating the 100th anniversary of Leber's birth. The stamp shows an image of Leber in profile with his birth and death dates.
