= John B. Fullerton =

American businessman and author

Academic background
- Education: University of Michigan College of Literature, Science, and the Arts; New York University Stern School of Business

John B. Fullerton is an American economist, investor, and author of the 2015 booklet, Regenerative Capitalism: How Universal Patterns and Principles Will Shape the New Economy.

== Biography ==
Fullerton began his financial career with JPMorgan. Following his retirement from JP Morgan, he experienced the September 11 attacks. In 2010, he created the Capital Institute, a think-tank on regenerative economic theory, an attempt to imagine economics and finance in service to life.

During his Wall Street career, John managed numerous capital markets and derivatives businesses around the globe, and was JPMorgan's Oversight Committee Representative that managed the rescue of Long Term Capital Management in 1998, and finally was Chief Investment Officer for Lab Morgan before retiring from the firm. An impact investor, John is the co-founder and Chairman of New Day Enterprises, PBC, the co-founder of Grasslands, LLC, and a board member of First Crop, and the Savory Institute. He is an advisor to numerous sustainability initiatives, and is a member of the Club of Rome. John speaks internationally to public audiences and universities, and writes a monthly blog, The Future of Finance, syndicated on The Guardian, The Huffington Post, CSRWire, the New York Society of Security Analysts’ blog, and other publications. He has appeared on PBS Frontline, and been featured in pieces by The New York Times, Bloomberg, The Wall Street Journal, Barrons, WOR radio, Real News Network, INET, Think Progress, The Laura Flanders Show on GRITtv, and The Free Forum Show with Terrence NcNally.

== Early life ==
Fullerton received a BA in economics from the University of Michigan, and an MBA from the Stern School of Business at New York University.

== Publications ==
- "The Relevance of E. F. Schumacher in the 21st Century," (Schumacher Center for a New Economics, May 2008).
- "The Big Choice," (Future of Finance Blog, July 2011).
- "Financial Overshoot," (Future of Finance Blog, July 2012).
- “Evergreen Direct Investing,” (2013)
- "Limits to Investment," (Great Transition Initiative at Tellus Institute, April 2014).
- “Regenerative Capitalism: How Universal Principles And Patterns Will Shape Our New Economy,” (2015)
- “Finance for a Regenerative World,” (2018)
- “A Finer Future : Creating an Economy in Service to Life,” with Hunter Lovins, Stewart Wallis, Anders Wijkman (2018)
