= Stuart Wallace =

Stuart or Stewart Wallace may refer to:

- Stuart Wallace (golfer), winner of Texas State Open
- Stuart Wallace (sailor) in Laser World Championships
- Stewart Wallace, composer

== See also ==
- Stewart Wallis, business manager
