= Boyd Cohen =

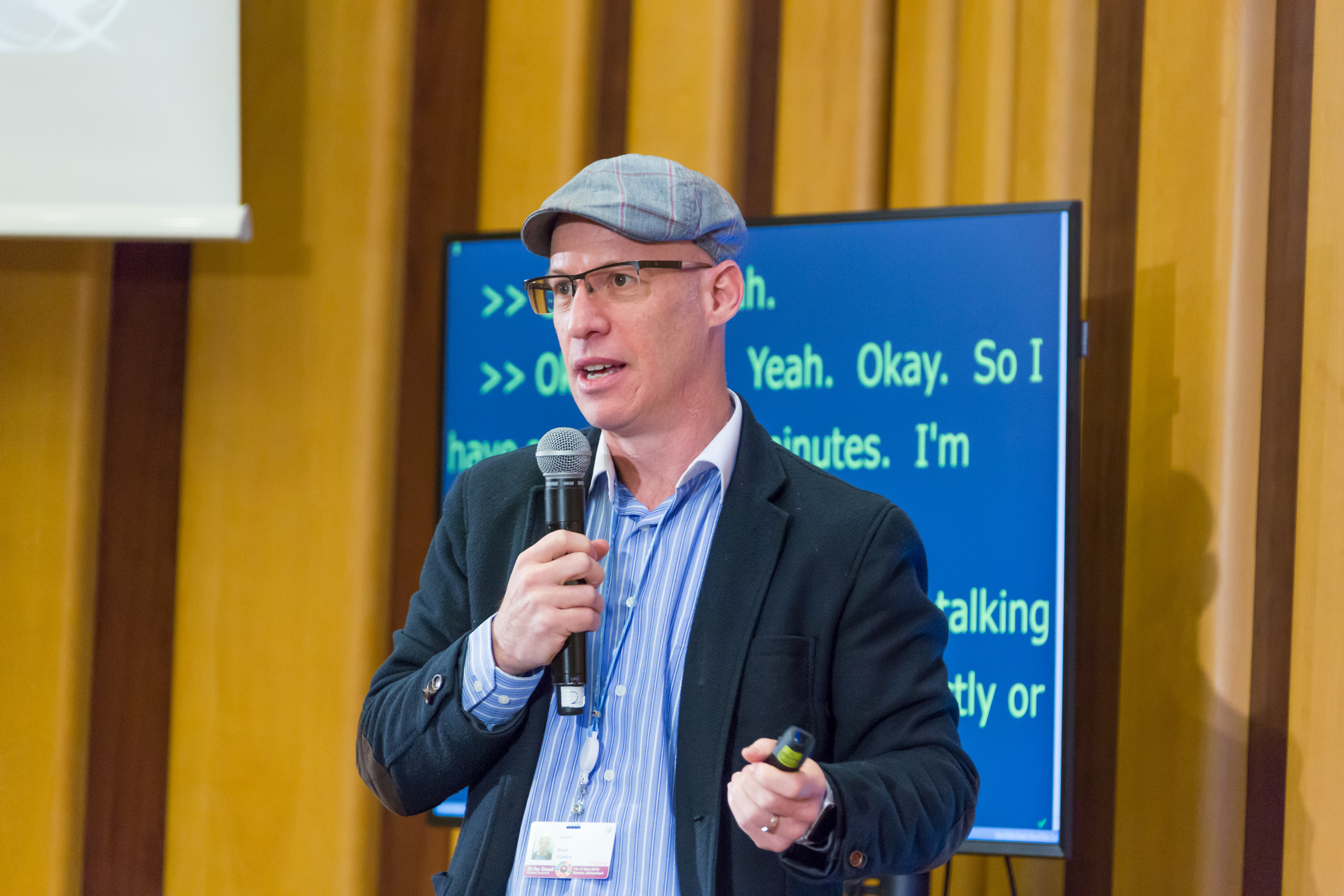
- Born: 1970 (age 55–56)
- Citizenship: United States
- Education: Miami University; University of South Carolina; University of Colorado
- Known for: Climate Capitalism; Smart Cities Wheel; IoMob
- Scientific career
- Fields: Sustainability; Smart Cities; Urban mobility
- Workplaces: EADA Business School; Instituto de Empresa; INCAE Business School; Simon Fraser University; Accenture; Universidad de San Andres
- Website: boydcohen.impress.ly

Boyd Cohen (born 1970) is an urban and climate strategist working in the area of sustainable development and smart cities. Currently he is Dean of Research at EADA Business School and co-founder of IoMob. Cohen received a PhD in Strategy & Entrepreneurship from the University of Colorado (2001). Along with Hunter Lovins, he co-authored Climate Capitalism: Capitalism in the Age of Climate Change in 2011. In recent years, Cohen has become most recognized for his work in smart cities, beginning with his Smart Cities Wheel framework and associated annual rankings of smart cities. In 2016, he published his second book, The Emergence of the Urban Entrepreneur, followed by the publication of his 3rd book, Post-Capitalist Entrepreneurship in 2017.

== Background ==
=== Education ===
Cohen obtained his undergraduate degree in Organizational Behavior from Miami University in 1993. He completed his master's degree in Human Resources from the University of South Carolina. His final semester was spent at the Copenhagen Business School. After working for three years with Accenture in the U.S., Cohen began his PhD studies in strategy and entrepreneurship at the University of Colorado (Boulder).

=== Academic career ===
After obtaining his PhD at the University of Colorado, Cohen’s first academic position was at the Instituto de Empresa in Madrid. Later he went to the University of Victoria in Canada from 2002-2006. While there he also was a visiting professor at INCAE. He later joined Simon Fraser University in Vancouver, Canada and also served as an adjunct at the University of British Columbia. Since then Cohen has been on the faculty at business schools in Argentina, Chile and Barcelona, Spain.

== Experience ==
Cohen has been involved in several sustainable startups since the early 2000s. After obtaining his LEED Accredited Professional status in Canada he worked as an independent sustainable building and neighborhood consultant followed by early involvement in the startup of Recollective, a green building consultancy based in Vancouver. He then co-founded Visible Strategies, a smart city software as a service solution focused on assisting cities transparently track and communicate their sustainability progress against long-term measurable objectives. Some of Visible Strategies clients including Live Earth; Beaverton, Oregon; Marin County, California and Albuquerque, New Mexico. He then founded a mobile app company, 3rdWhale which focused on developing smartphone apps for green consumers. Later he co-founded CO2IMPACT which developed energy efficiency and carbon reduction projects in Colombia and other developing countries. Cohen is co-founder and CEO of IoMob which is a blockchain project developing the Internet of Mobility.

== Research and publications ==
Cohen has spent much of his professional life researching sustainability, entrepreneurship and smart cities. Aside from publications in the Journal of Business Venturing, Strategic Management Journal, and Business Strategy and the Environment, Cohen has also focused on reaching practitioner audiences.

Climate Capitalism was published in 2011 and helped Boyd become more globally known for his work. He began writing for Triple Pundit, Fast Company, the Huffington Post, and UBM Future Cities.

Cohen's "smart cities wheel", first introduced in Fast Company, has become one of the most cited models for smart cities. Since 2011, he has published annual rankings of smart cities around the globe using the wheel and several indicators.

In 2014, Cohen joined forces with Esteve Almirall from ESADE in Barcelona, and Henry Chesbrough to launch a special issue of the California Management Review focused on cities, open innovation and the collaborative economy.

In 2016, Cohen published The Emergence of the Urban Entrepreneur with a foreword by Richard Florida and support from Pablo Muñoz.

In 2017, Cohen published Post-Capitalist Entrepreneurship.

== Keynote speeches ==
Cohen is a frequent speaker on the topic of sustainability and smart cities, and has been featured as keynote speaker and did a TEDx talk in 2013

- TEDx Event, Argentina, 2013
