= Hermann Maaß =

German resistance fighter (1897–1944)

- Born: 23 October 1897; Bromberg, Province of Posen, German Empire (modern Bydgoszcz, Poland)
- Died: 20 October 1944 (aged 46); Plötzensee Prison, Berlin, Nazi Germany
- Cause of death: Execution by hanging
- Political party: Social Democratic Party of Germany
- Spouse: Eva Maaß
- Children: 6

Hermann Maaß (23 October 1897 – 20 October 1944) was a German member of the Resistance against the Nazi régime.

== Biography ==
Maaß was born in Bromberg, Province of Posen, German Empire (modern Bydgoszcz, Poland), he volunteered for the German Army in World War I and was wounded in a gas attack in 1918. After the war he studied philosophy, psychology, and sociology at the Humboldt University of Berlin and the political science institute (Hochschule für Politik).

Maaß worked as general manager of the Reich Committee of German Youth Associations (Reichsausschuß der deutschen Jugendverbände). After the Nazis seized power in 1933 he lost this position because all youth organizations were forced to conform to the party line. Maaß now became a close associate of Wilhelm Leuschner, the former minister of the interior of the People's State of Hesse.

Maaß turned down a teaching position at Harvard University to continue his fight against National Socialism from within Germany. He organized resistance among former labor unionists and had close contact to the Kreisau Circle of Helmuth James Graf von Moltke, Peter Yorck von Wartenburg and Adam von Trott zu Solz. In the autumn of 1943, Maaß met Claus von Stauffenberg at his home.

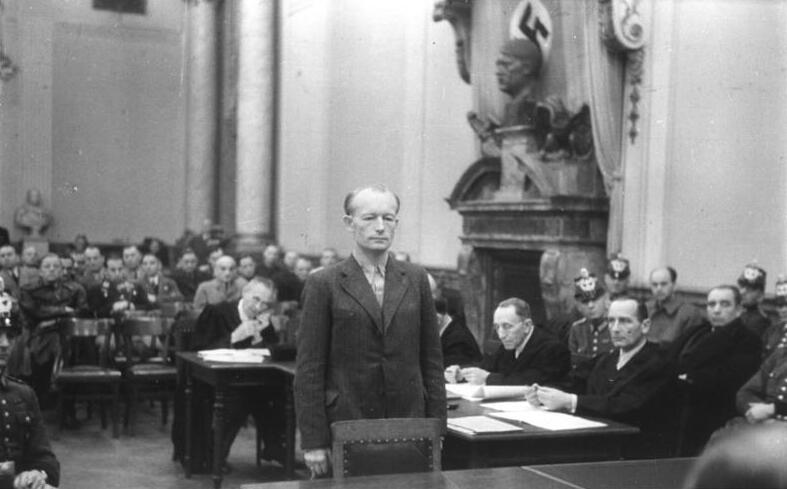
Adolf Reichwein, co-defendant of Maaß, at the Volksgerichtshof

After the failure of Stauffenberg's attempt to kill Hitler, Maaß was arrested on 8 August 1944, and imprisoned at Ravensbrück concentration camp. He was charged at the Volksgerichtshof for his involvement in the resistance movement next to Adolf Reichwein, Julius Leber and Gustav Dahrendorf. Maaß, Reichwein and Leber were sentenced to death on 20 October 1944, with Maaß and Reichwein executed the same day at 3.40 p.m. at Plötzensee prison.

His 43-year-old wife died of pneumonia 5 weeks after his death; they left behind 6 young children.
