= Hunter Lovins =

American environmentalist, sustainable development advocate

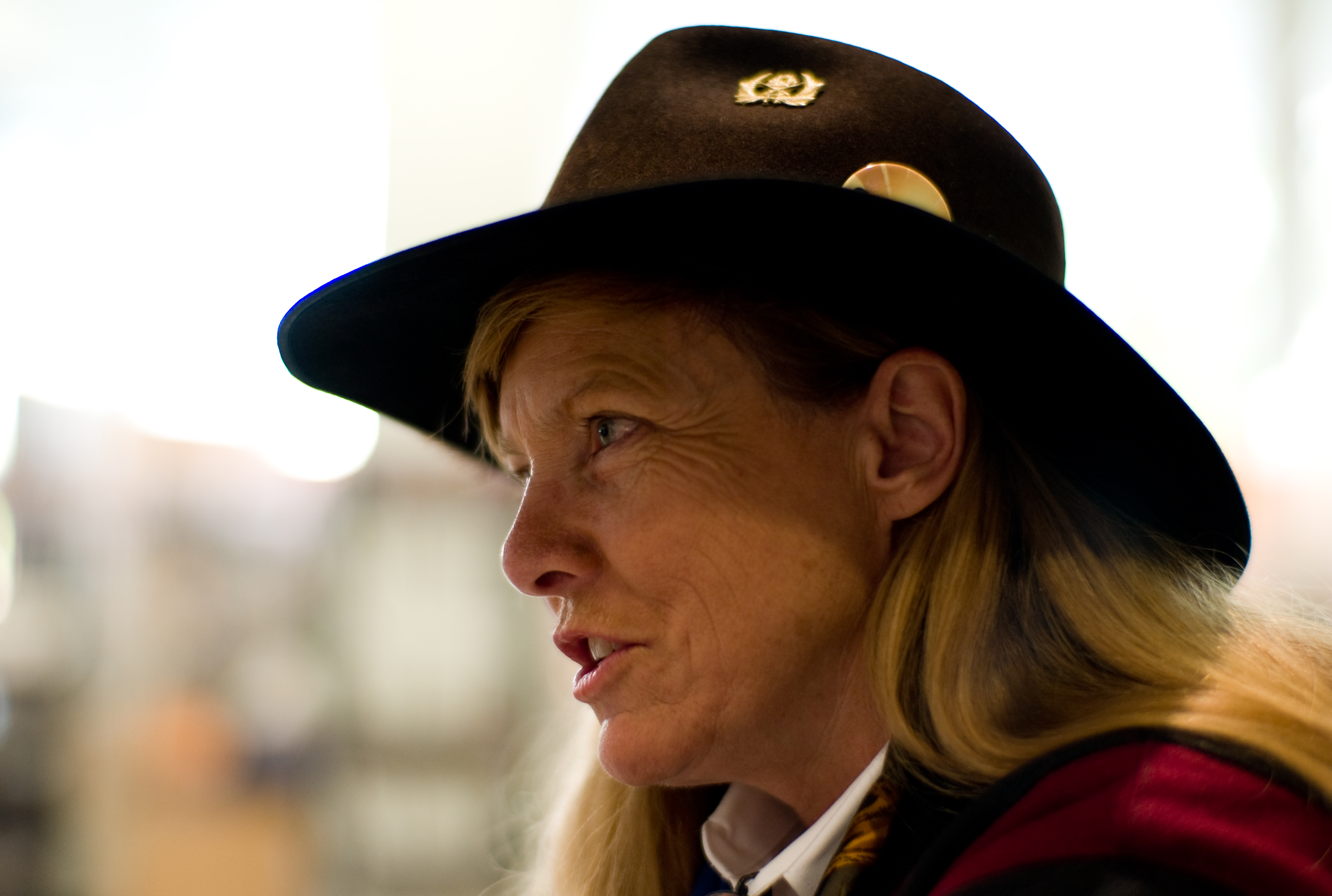
Hunter Lovins 2007

L. Hunter Lovins (née Sheldon, born February 26, 1950, in Middlebury, Vermont) is an American environmentalist, author, sustainable development proponent, co-founder of Rocky Mountain Institute, and president of the nonprofit organization Natural Capitalism Solutions.

== Education and career ==
Lovins received an undergraduate degree in sociology and political science from Pitzer College in 1972, and a J.D. from Loyola Law School in 1975.

A practicing attorney (member of the State Bar of California), Lovins helped establish the urban forestry and environmental education group California Conservation Project (Tree People), and was their assistant director for about six years. She served as policy adviser for Friends of the Earth under David Brower.

In 1982, Hunter Lovins and Amory Lovins co-founded Rocky Mountain Institute in Snowmass, Colorado. They initially ran the research foundation out of their home and referred to it as a "think-and-do-tank". Hunter Lovins served as RMI's CEO for strategy until 2002.

Lovins has taught at several universities including Dartmouth College, where she was a Henry R. Luce visiting professor, and the Bainbridge Graduate Institute's Pinchot University, which became Presidio Graduate School in 2016.

In 2013, Hunter served as a mentor for Unreasonable at Sea, a technology business accelerator for social entrepreneurs seeking to scale their ventures in international markets, founded by Unreasonable Group, Semester at Sea, and Stanford University’s Hasso Plattner Institute of Design.

Lovins is a founding professor of the MBA in sustainability at Bard College, where she serves as a faculty member.

Lovins has addressed major gatherings such as the World Economic Forum, the United States Congress, and the World Summit on Sustainable Development. She has also done consulting for citizens’ groups, governments, and corporations.

Lovins is credited with coining the phrase global weirding—a play on the term global warming—in the early 2000s. The phrase describes weather phenomena that had not previously been seen.

== Awards and recognition ==
In 1983, she and Amory Lovins were awarded the Right Livelihood Award for "pioneering soft energy paths for global security."

Lovins received a 1993 Nissan Award for an article on the Hypercar. The Lindbergh Foundation recognized her with the 1999 Lindbergh Award for "outstanding achievements in energy and environmental practice and policy." Lovins received a Leadership in Business Award at the Natural Business Conference in June 2001 for her work in the lifestyles of health and sustainability (LOHAS) industry.

She received Loyola Law School’s Alumni Association Board of Governors Recognition Award in 2000. The following year, Lovins and her Natural Capitalism co-authors were recognized with a Shingo Prize for manufacturing research. In 2005, she received the Distinguished Alumni Award of Pitzer College.

Time magazine featured Lovins in 2000 as one of their "Heroes for the Planet".

== Personal life ==
In 1979, Hunter married Amory Lovins. The couple separated in 1989 and divorced in 1999.

== Publications ==
Lovins co-authored the following books:

- Energy/War, Breaking the Nuclear Link (1981)
- Brittle Power: Energy Strategy for National Security (1982)
- Least-Cost Energy: Solving the CO2 Problem (1981)
- The First Nuclear World War: A Strategy for Preventing Nuclear Wars and the Spread of Nuclear Weapons (1983)
- Energy Unbound: A Fable for America's Future (1986)
- Green Development: Green Development: Integrating Ecology and Real Estate (1998)
- Factor 4: Doubling Wealth - Halving Resource Use and Least Cost Energy with Ernst Ulrich von Weizsäcker (1998)
- Natural Capitalism: Creating the Next Industrial Revolution (1999)
- Climate Capitalism: Capitalism in the Age of Climate Change (2011)
- The Way Out: Kickstarting Capitalism to Save Our Economic Ass (2012)
- Creating a Lean and Green Business System: Techniques for Improving Profits and Sustainability (2013)
- A Finer Future: Creating an Economy in Service to Life with Stewart Wallis, Anders Wijkman, John B. Fullerton (2018)

Lovins has also written articles for Unreasonable Group's online hub focused on social entrepreneurship.
