= Julius Leber Barracks (Berlin) =

- Wedding district, Berlin

Site information
- Type: Military headquarters
- Controlled by: Germany

Site history
- In use: 1936–present
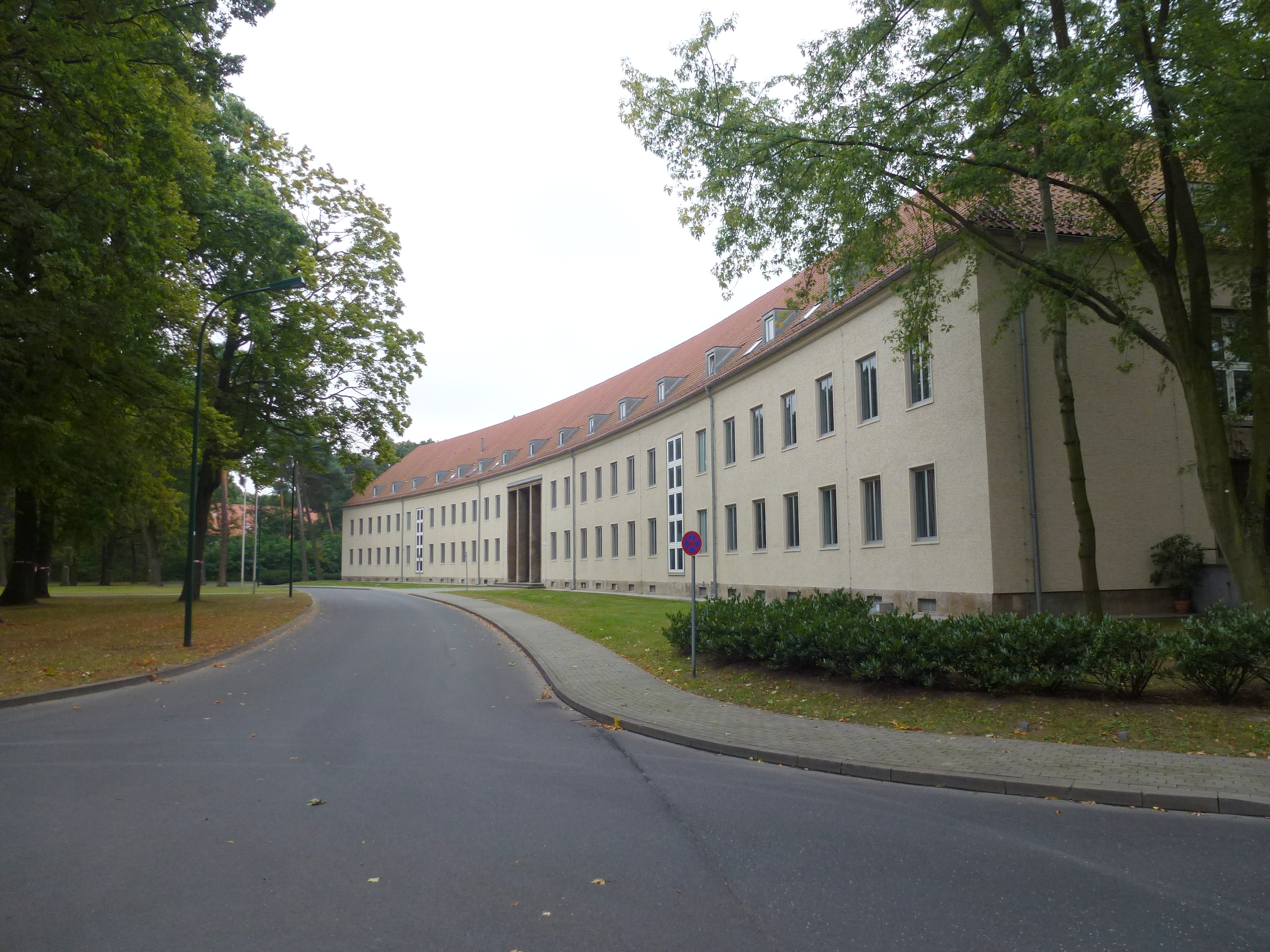
- Interactive map of Julius-Leber-Kaserne
- Coordinates: 52°33′34″N 13°19′26″E
- Country: Germany
- City: Berlin

The Julius Leber Barracks (German: Julius-Leber-Kaserne) is the largest Bundeswehr barracks in Berlin, located at the district of Wedding, directly southeast of the former Berlin-Tegel Airport and are bordered by the Kurt-Schumacher-Damm and Charles-Corcelle-Ring. The barracks is named after the SPD politician and resistance fighter Julius Leber, the barracks are a listed building. They house 36 Bundeswehr offices.

From 1896, the site, known as Kaserne Reinickendorf, housed the 1st Airship Battalion. During the Nazi era, a large barracks complex known as the Hermann Göring Barracks was built in 1936. From 1945 to 1994, it served as Quartier Napoléon, the headquarters of the French forces in Berlin.

== History ==
The Jungfernheide area was already used for military purposes in the 19th century. In 1896, the first airborne unit in German military history, the 1st Airship Battalion, was housed here in newly constructed barracks. After the end of the World War I, the Treaty of Versailles prohibited the German Reich from maintaining air forces. From 1928 onwards, the site was used by the police, and the airship hangars were demolished.

From 1936 to 1939, a spacious barracks complex was built on the site for the Luftwaffe's Infantry Regiment "General Göring" (later: Parachute Panzer Division 1 Hermann Göring), formed from the state police. The design was by Chief Building Officer Schneidt and envisaged 130 buildings arranged around a central axis. The site also includes a sports facility with a running track and outdoor swimming pool. The triangular site is accessed by an oval ring road, the narrower end of which leads to the entrance building at the northeast corner of the site.

A vehicle hall in the barracks served as one of the collection points for the so-called Fabrikaktion (Factory Action), the arrest of the last Berlin Jews who had previously been spared deportation in 1943.

After the unconditional surrender of the Wehrmacht and the Allied occupation of Berlin, the French Army established the "Quartier Napoléon" here in August 1945 as the headquarters of the Forces Françaises à Berlin. From 1945 to 1955, they restored the complex, which had been badly damaged by the war and the occupation by the Red Army. South of the complex, the French built the Cité Joffre residential complex. From 1945 onwards, an air force command was stationed in the Quartier Napoléon, which developed Tegel Airport into a French military airfield. The 46th Infantry Regiment was added in 1947, and the 11th Chasseur Regiment in 1955. Both units specialized in urban warfare and anti-tank warfare, in keeping with their mission. Other French units in the barracks complex included pioneers, a supply battalion, and the military gendarmerie, which also served on the sector border. The French military radio station Radio ffb also broadcast from the Quartier Napoléon, mostly as a relay station and without its own editorial staff.

After the withdrawal of the Allied troops, the Bundeswehr took over the site in 1994. On January 5, 1995, the 50th anniversary of Julius Leber's death, the barracks were renamed Julius Leber Barracks in the presence of former German Chancellor Helmut Schmidt, Julius Leber's daughter, and the then Federal Minister of Defense Volker Rühe.

Since July 14, 2022, the barracks have housed a small military history collection entitled "49 Years of French Armed Forces in Berlin 1945-1994." It uses contemporary photographs, exhibits from the various military departments of the Quartier Napoléon, and reports on everyday service to primarily illustrate the history of the site under French control up to the 1990s.

On March 5, 2024, a threshold was installed in front of the barracks, commemorating the assembly camp during the Fabrikaktion (Factory Action) of 1943.
