= Climate Capitalism =

2011 book by Hunter Lovins

- Author: L. Hunter Lovins; Boyd Cohen
- Publisher: Hill and Wang
- Publication date: 2011
- Pages: 390
- ISBN: 978-0-8090-3473-4
- OCLC: 650212547

Climate Capitalism: Capitalism in the Age of Climate Change is a 2011 book by L. Hunter Lovins and Boyd Cohen. It presents positive stories and examples of how profit-seeking companies are helping to save the planet, and says that "the best way to rebuild America’s economy, cities and job markets is to invest in energy efficiency and renewable energy resources, whether climate change is happening or not". However, reviewer Gail Whiteman is unconvinced by the argument that naked greed and market forces will drive businesses to cut their greenhouse gas emissions.

== See also ==
- Natural Capitalism: Creating the Next Industrial Revolution
- Merchants of Doubt
- Reinventing Fire
- Climate change controversy
- Climate change policy of the United States
- Eco-capitalism
- Media coverage of climate change
