= Natural Capitalism =

1999 book by Hawken, Lovins, & Lovins

Natural Capitalism : Creating the Next Industrial Revolution
- Author: Paul Hawken; Amory B Lovins; L Hunter Lovins
- Subject: Economic forecasting, capitalism, environmental protection
- Publisher: Little, Brown & Company
- Publication date: 1999
- Pages: xix, 396 p.
- ISBN: 978-0-316-35316-8
- Dewey Decimal: 338.064
- LC Class: HC106.82 .H39 1999

Natural Capitalism: Creating the Next Industrial Revolution is a 1999 book on environmental economics co-authored by Paul Hawken, Amory Lovins and Hunter Lovins. It has been translated into a dozen languages and was the subject of a Harvard Business Review summary.

== Content ==
In Natural Capitalism the authors describe the global economy as being dependent on natural resources and ecosystem services that nature provides. Natural Capitalism is a critique of traditional "Industrial Capitalism", saying that the traditional system of capitalism "does not fully conform to its own accounting principles. It liquidates its capital and calls it income. It neglects to assign any value to the largest stocks of capital it employs – the natural resources and living systems, as well as the social and cultural systems that are the basis of human capital."

Natural capitalism recognizes the critical interdependency between the production and use of human-made capital and the maintenance and supply of natural capital. The authors argue that only through recognizing this essential relationship with the Earth's valuable resources can businesses, and the people they support, continue to exist.

Their fundamental questions concern the theoretical properties of an economy that, among other tenets, organizes around a more realistic ideation of the principles of business and industry, and envisioning a world in which this is a reality is a key concern of the argument.

The authors of Natural Capitalism claim that these choices are possible and "such an economy would offer a stunning new set of opportunities for all of society, amounting to no less than the next industrial revolution."

According to the authors, the "next industrial revolution" depends on the espousal of four central strategies: "the conservation of resources through more effective manufacturing processes, the reuse of materials as found in natural systems, a change in values from quantity to quality, and investing in natural capital, or restoring and sustaining natural resources".

While traditional industrial capitalism primarily recognizes the value of money and goods as capital, Natural Capitalism extends recognition to natural capital and human capital. Problems such as pollution and social injustice may then be seen as failures to properly account for capital, rather than as inherent failures of capitalism itself.

The fundamental assumptions of Natural Capitalism are as follows:

1. The limiting factor to future economic development is the availability and functionality of natural capital, in particular, life-supporting services that have no substitutes and currently have no market value.
2. Misconceived or badly designed business systems, population growth, and wasteful patterns of consumption are the primary causes of the loss of natural capital, and all three must be addressed to achieve a sustainable economy.
3. Future economic progress can best take place in democratic, market-based systems of production and distribution in which all forms of capital are fully valued, including human, manufactured, financial, and natural capital.
4. One of the keys to the most beneficial employment of people, money, and the environment is radical increases in resource productivity.
5. Human welfare is best served by improving the quality and flow of desired services delivered, rather than by merely increasing the total dollar flow.
6. Economic and environmental sustainability depends on redressing global inequities of income and material well-being.

== Meaning of book's title ==
In a 2009 interview, Paul Hawken described his motivation behind the title Natural Capitalism. He stated that it was intended to be a pun on "natural capital", a term originally coined by E. F. Schumacher in 1973. Hawken endorsed the underlying concept of natural capital, and its implications for society, so added an "-ism" at the end of that word as a double entendre.

Despite this intention from Hawken, many readers interpreted this wordplay in the opposite way. There was dissent from readers who misunderstood the title, believing that Capitalism was the operative word, and that the authors were therefore justifying or defending the concept of capitalism. Hawken later expressed regret at this confusion, and stated that while he endorses the spirit of commerce and entrepreneurship, he does not endorse the "pathological" qualities inherent in pure capitalism.

== Other editions ==
- Zi4 ran2 zi1 ben3 lun4, Chinese (simplified characters) edition of Natural Capitalism (2000, Shanghai Popular Science Press) ISBN 7-5427-1846-0
- Capitalismo naturale (2001, Edizione Ambiente, Milano), ISBN 88-86412-80-0
- Japanese edition of Natural Capitalism (2001, Nikkei, Tokyo) ISBN 4-532-14871-5
- Chinese (complex characters) edition of Natural Capitalism (2002, CommonWealth, Taipei) ISBN 957-0395-61-3
- Öko-Kapitalismus: Die industrielle Revolution des 21. Jahrhunderts (2002, Riemann, München) ISBN 978-1-4000-3941-8
- Loodus-kapitalism: uue tööstusrevolutionsiooni algus (2003 [Estonian]) ISBN 9985-62-131-X
- Capitalismo Natural (Editora Cultrix, São Paulo), ISBN 85-316-0644-6
- Natural Capitalism: Comment réconcilier économie et environnement (2008, Scali, Paris) ISBN 978-2-35012-221-2
- Korean edition of Natural Capitalism (~2011, Gongjon, Seoul)

== See also ==
- Climate Capitalism
- Eco-capitalism
- Media coverage of climate change
- Merchants of Doubt
