= Ellen Dahrendorf =

British historian and translator

Ellen Dahrendorf, Baroness Dahrendorf (née Ellen Joan Krug) is a British historian and translator of Russian political works, and the former wife (1980–2004) of the late German/British academic and politician Ralf Dahrendorf.

Lady Dahrendorf has served on the boards of Article 19, the Jewish Institute for Policy Research, has been chair of the British branch of the New Israel Fund, was a co-founder of the Working Group on the Internment of Dissidents in Psychiatric Hospitals and also Independent Jewish Voices organisation. She has spoken out on the Independent Jewish Voices website against Israel's occupation of the West Bank.

She is the daughter of James Krug, a school teacher and married Ralf Dahrendorf in 1980.

With her former husband, she lived in London and with a vacation home in Bonndorf, Germany.

== Publications ==
- Russian Studies, ed. by Leonard Schapiro, 1986

=== Translations ===
- A Question of Madness, by Zhores A. Medvedev and Roy A. Medvedev
- On Socialist Democracy, by Roy A. Medvedev
- Unknown Stalin, by Zhores A. Medvedev
