= French Forces in Berlin =

French army occupation of Berlin during the Cold War

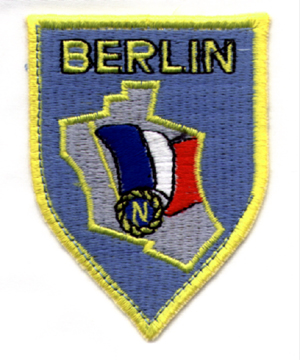
- Country: France
- Branch: French Army
- Part of: French Armed Forces

The French Forces in Berlin (French: Forces Françaises à Berlin) were the units of the French Armed Forces stationed since 1945 until the end of the Cold War-era in West Berlin, according to the agreements of the Yalta Conference and Potsdam Conference. The troops were the French counterparts to the United States' Berlin Brigade and the United Kingdom's Berlin Infantry Brigade in the city.

== History ==
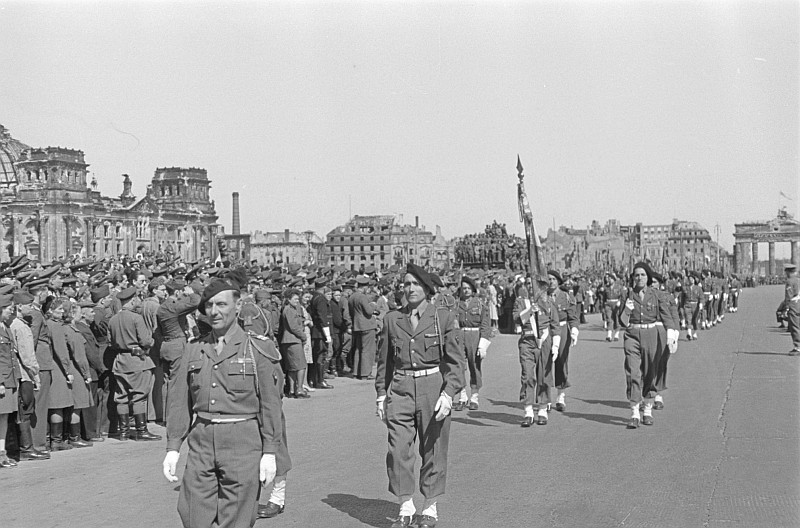
French forces of 159^{e} Régiment d'Infanterie Alpine, parading in front of the Reichstag (1946)

By agreement of the Allies, Berlin was divided into four sectors, after the unconditional surrender on May 8, 1945. The allied powers of France, the Soviet Union, the United Kingdom and the United States of America were each granted control of a sector, with permission to station troops there.

The first contingent of French forces, from the 1st Armored Division, arrived in Berlin on July 3, 1945 A.D. They were led by General de Beauchesne and occupied Camp "Cyclop", in the district of Reinickendorf.

After the withdrawal of the Soviet Union from the Allied Control Council and the start of the Berlin Crisis, in 1961, units from the other three countries were ordered to protect West Berlin against Soviet troops and against the GDR's own National People's Army (NVA) troops, since the Federal Republic of Germany was not allowed to station Bundeswehr units in West Berlin. The French Army first stationed troops in Berlin in 1947. Their headquarters were called "Quartier Napoléon".

After the end of the Cold War and the Two Plus Four Agreement, all Allied troops left Berlin, in July 1994.

== Units ==
=== Combat units ===
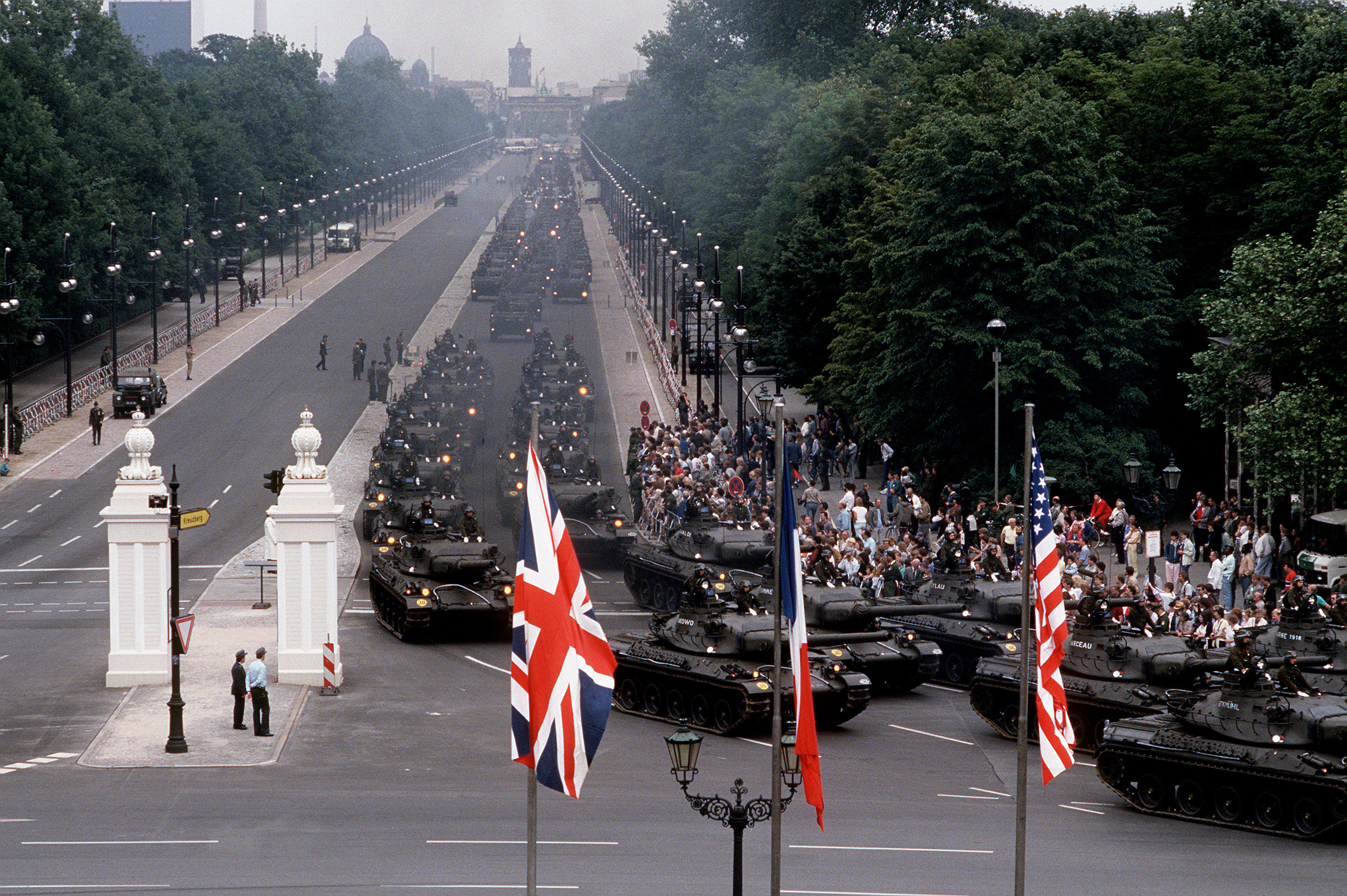
AMX-30 of 11^{ème} Régiment de Chasseurs (1988)

- 11^{e} Régiment de Chasseurs (11^{e} RCh) [40x AMX-30B, 2x AMX-30D]
- 46^{e} Régiment d'Infanterie (46^{e} RI) [70x VAB]
- 110^{e} Compagnie du Génie (110^{e} CG)
- Centre Entrainement de Commando (CEC No. 10)

=== Support units ===
- 11^{ème} Compagnie de Transmission
- Gendarmerie Berlin
- Hôpital "Louis Pasteur"
- Base Aérienne 165 Berlin Tegel (1x Max Holste MH1521 Broussard - 1988, 1x DHC-6-300 Twin Otter – 1988-1994)
- Groupement de Soutien
- Quartier-Général
- Direction des Transport et de la Circulation de Berlin (TMFB – Train Militaire Française de Berlin)
- État-Major
- Détachement de l'Aviation Légère de l'Armée de Terre (DETALAT) [2x Cessna O-1 Bird Dog – 1968-1993, 2x Sud-Ouest Alouette III – 1987-1994]

=== Subordinate unit ===
- Mission Militaire Française de Liaison – MMFL, in Potsdam
