= Dahrendorf hypothesis =

Name given to hypothesis by Ralf Dahrendorf

The Dahrendorf hypothesis is the name given to a hypothesis by the German-British political scientist Ralf Dahrendorf, which states that diversity is desirable in economic policies across time and space according to local needs.

Dahrendorf argues that societies are quite considerably different from each other, and that any one set of economic policies will not be equally well adapted to all societies (e.g. the same policies will not work as well in poor, subsistence economies as they will in advanced industrial economies). The Dahrendorf hypothesis was developed in opposition to many traditional perspectives and theories in economics, most notably neoclassical economics, which implicitly or explicitly hold that one set of economic policies should be implemented globally and universally.

In accordance with this belief, Dahrendorf said that, far from uniting Europe, the introduction of the Euro would ultimately divide it.
