= Nicola Dahrendorf =

- Occupations: Human Rights and Humanitarian Practitioner

Nicola Dahrendorf is a German and British national. She is a practitioner with 30 years’ experience in conflict and post-war settings with INGOs, the United Nations, the UK government and in an academic capacity. Her professional focus has been on peace building and conflict resolution, protection of civilians and child protection, sexual and gender-based violence and on security sector and justice reform in fragile environments. She has been engaged in providing support to community-based mediation and exploring the role of artistic practice in conflict environments and peace processes for the Swiss FDFA. Her past UN work involved six peacekeeping operations in senior management positions. She has worked at UNICEF HQ as Chief of Humanitarian Policy and Advocacy and with UNHCR for seven years on refugee protection.She was head of humanitarian policy in UNICEF, the UN Special Advisor on sexual violence in the Democratic Republic of Congo, and has also served as Director of the Office for Addressing Sexual Exploitation and Abuse. Director of the Conflict Security and Development Group at King's College, London, She has carried out assignments for the Norwegian Refugee Council as a Senior Protection Adviser, with the Swiss Development Corporation. For the UK Government Stabilisation Unit and (former) DFID Conflict and Humanitarian Affairs Department (between 2010–17) she worked in Kenya, Nigeria, DRC, South Sudan, Somalia and Nepal. She has worked in academia at King’s College London, was a visiting research fellow at Birkbeck College, University of London and is now a visiting fellow at the University of Edinburgh. She has studied social anthropology and law. She is the daughter of Vera Dahrendorf (née Banister) and Lord Dahrendorf.
