= Adolf Reichwein =

German policymaker and resistor to Nazism (1898–1944)

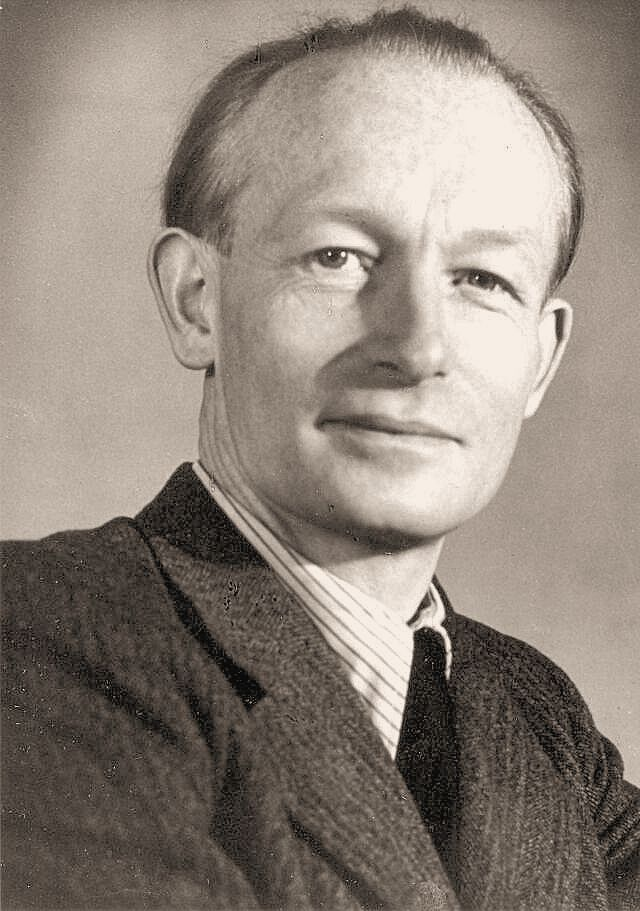
- Reichwein, c. 1940
- Born: 3 October 1898; Bad Ems, Germany
- Died: 20 October 1944 (aged 46); Plötzensee Prison, Berlin, Germany
- Cause of death: Execution by hanging

Adolf Reichwein (3 October 1898 – 20 October 1944) was a German educator, economist, and cultural policymaker for the SPD, who resisted the policies of Nazi Germany.

== Biography ==
Reichwein was born in Bad Ems, then located in the province of Hesse-Nassau within the Kingdom of Prussia (modern-day Germany). He took part in the First World War, in which he was seriously wounded in the lung. Reichwein studied at the universities of Frankfurt am Main and Marburg, under Hugo Sinzheimer and Franz Oppenheimer, among others. In the 1920s, he was active in education policy and adult education in Berlin and Thuringia. It was he who founded the Volkshochschule ("People's High School"; i.e. Community College) and the Arbeiterbildungsheim ("Workers' Training Home") in Jena and ran them until 1929. In his Hungermarsch nach Lappland ("Hunger March to Lappland") he described in diary form a punishing hike with some young jobless people in the far north. In 1929–1930, he worked as an adviser to the Prussian Culture Minister Carl Heinrich Becker.

From 1930 until 1933, he was a professor at the newly founded Pedagogical Academy in Halle. After the Nazis seized power, he was let go for political reasons and sent off to Tiefensee in Brandenburg to become an elementary schoolteacher. There, until 1939, he conducted many instructional experiments, which received a lot of attention, with educational progressivism and especially vocational education in mind. Reichwein described in his work Schaffendes Schulvolk ("Productive School People") his instructional concept, inspired by the Wandervogel movement and labour-school pedagogy, whose main focus was on trips, activity-oriented instruction with school gardens, and projects spanning age groups. For Sachunterricht (~field education, or practical learning) and its history, he included important historical documents. Reichwein split the instructional content into a summer cycle (natural sciences and social studies) and a winter cycle ("Man as former"/"in his territory"). From 1939, Reichwein was working at the Folklore Museum in Berlin as a museum educator.

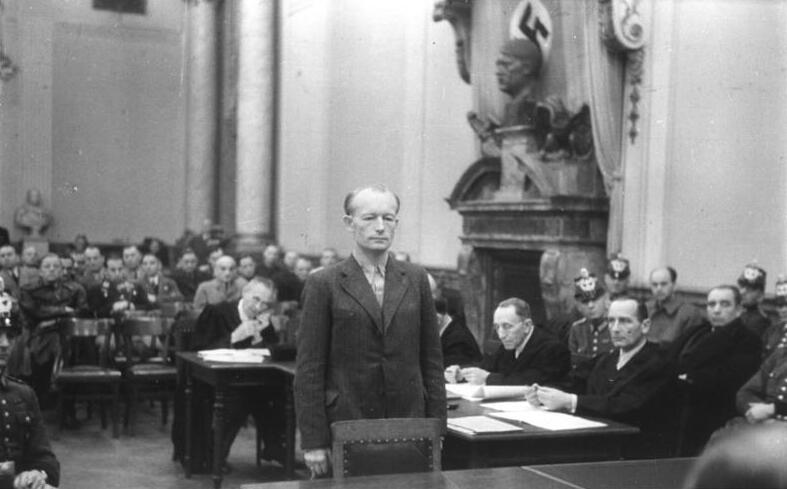
Adolf Reichwein at the Volksgerichtshof

Reichwein was active in the German resistance movement against Hitler and National Socialism as a member of the Kreisau Circle. In early July 1944, Reichwein was arrested by the Gestapo. On 20 October 1944, he was sentenced to death by Roland Freisler in a joint Volksgerichtshof trial alongside Julius Leber, Hermann Maaß, and Gustav Dahrendorf. He was executed next to Maaß at Plötzensee Prison in Berlin later that same day.

== Selected works ==
- Schaffendes Schulvolk. Kohlhammer Verlag, Stuttgart/Berlin 1937.
- Film in der Landschule. Kohlhammer Verlag, Stuttgart/Berlin 1938.
- (New annotated edition of both works:) Schaffendes Schulvolk – Film in der Schule. Die Tiefenseer Schulschriften. pub. by. Wolfgang Klafki et al.. Beltz, Weinheim/Basel 1993. ISBN 3-407-34063-X

== Literature ==
- Ullrich Amlung:
  - "... in der Entscheidung gibt es keine Umwege": Adolf Reichwein 1898–1944. Reformpädagoge, Sozialist, Widerstandskämpfer. 3. Auflage Schüren, Marburg 2003 ISBN 3-89472-273-8
  - Adolf Reichwein: 1898–1944. Ein Lebensbild des Reformpädagogen, Volkskundlers und Widerstandskämpfers. 2. Auflage dipa, Frankfurt am Main, 1999 ISBN 3-7638-0399-8
  - Adolf Reichwein 1898–1944. Eine Personalbibliographie. Universität Marburg 1991 (Schriften der Universitätsbibliothek Marburg, 54) ISBN 3-8185-0087-8
- James L. Henderson: The career of Adolf Reichwein: a study in socio-political tensions in German education between 1918 and 1945. PhD thesis, University of London, 1955.
- Hartmut Mitzlaff: Adolf Reichweins (1898–1944) heimliche Reformpraxis in Tiefensee 1933–1939. In: Astrid Kaiser, Detlef Pech (Hrsg.): Geschichte und historische Konzeptionen des Sachunterrichts. Schneider-Verlag Hohengehren, Baltmannsweiler 2004, S. 143–150. ISBN 3-89676-861-1
