= Gustav Dahrendorf =

German politician

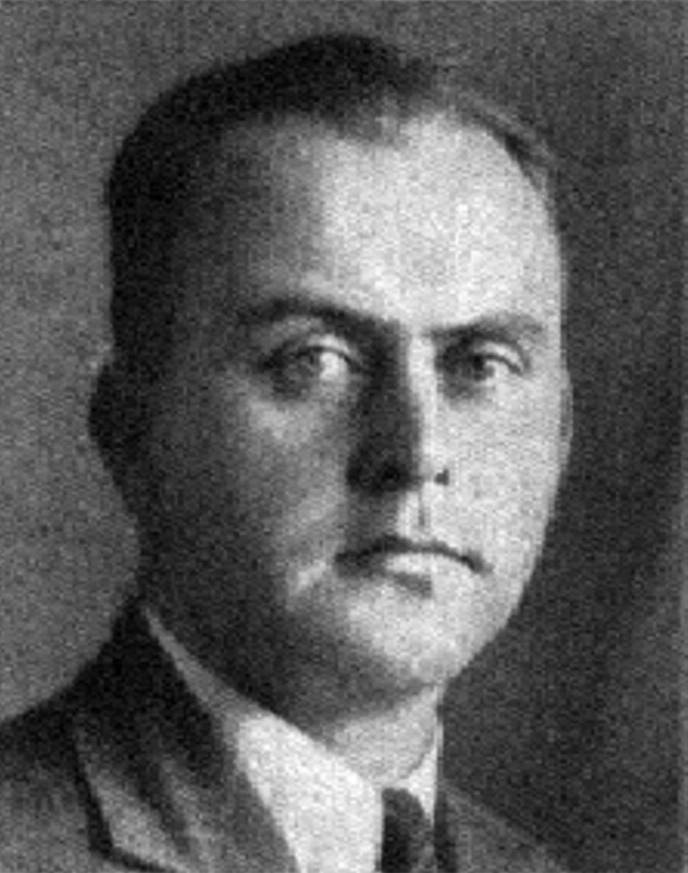
Dahrendorf's official Reichstag portrait, 1933

Gustav Dietrich Dahrendorf (8 January 1901, Hamburg – 30 October 1954) was a German SPD politician.

== Biography ==
Dahrendorf was born in Hamburg, he served as member of the Reichstag from November 1932 to 22 June 1933. He was also several times a member of the Hamburg Parliament. He was the father of Ralf Dahrendorf, Baron Dahrendorf and Frank Dahrendorf.

In 1944, Dahrendorf was tried for treason at the Volksgerichtshof for his involvement in the 20 July plot, alongside Julius Leber, Adolf Reichwein and Hermann Maaß. Leber, Reichwein, and Maaß were executed. However, Dahrendorf was spared execution, instead receiving a 7-year sentence. He was liberated from Brandenburg-Görden Prison by the Red Army in April 1945.

Dahrendorf died in Braunlage.
