= Stewart Wallis =

British businessman

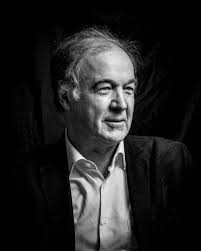

Stewart Wallis OBE (born 29 August 1948) is an advocate for a new economic system. He worked for Oxfam from 1992 to 2002, for which he was awarded an OBE. From 2003 to 2016, he was executive director of the New Economics Foundation. Currently, Wallis is the chair for the Wellbeing Economy Alliance (WEAll), which is an initiative to create a global new economy movement.

== Early life and education ==
He was born in 1948, the son of George and Jean Wallis. He took the tripos in natural sciences at Fitzwilliam College, Cambridge, and, in 1976, obtained a MSc in business and economics from the London Business School. In 2016, Stewart was awarded an honorary doctorate by Lancaster University.

== Career ==
His business career began in marketing and sales with Rio Tinto Zinc from 1970 to 1974. He spent 1976 to 1983 with the World Bank in Washington, D.C., working on industrial and financial development in East Asia. He then worked for Robinson Packaging in Derbyshire from 1983 to 1992, the last five as managing director.

He joined Oxfam in 1992 as international director with responsibility, latterly, for 2500 staff in seventy countries and for all Oxfam's policy, research, development and emergency work worldwide. He was awarded the OBE for services to Oxfam in June 2002.

Wallis was the executive director of the New Economics Foundation from November 2003 until December 2015. He was also a trustee of the Overseas Development Institute and Habitat for Humanity and a member of the UK Social Investment Task Force. He was also vice chair of the World Economic Forum's Global Agenda Council on values and a Steward of their Inclusive Growth Initiative.

He has since come out of retirement to voluntarily help to run the Wellbeing Economy Alliance (WEAll). Other recent roles include the Chair of the Conservation Farming Trust, and a Trustee of Devon Community Foundation.

== Publications ==
- A Finer Future, by Hunter Lovins, John Fullerton, Stewart Wallis and Anders Wijkman, 2017. ISBN 9780865718982
- Authored chapters on "A New Economic System Based on Core Human Values" in the book Why Love Matters and "Towards a Peaceful Economy" in the book Peacefulness - both edited by Scherto Gill and David Cadman.
- Democracy and Capitalism, Lord Dahrendorf with commentaries by Professor Gerry Stoker, Ruth Lea, Stewart Wallis and Vince Cable MP, Hansard Society, 2006. ISBN 978-0-900432-48-4; available as a free download
- Surviving the Century: Facing Climate Chaos and Other Global Challenges is a book of inspirational and practical solutions, edited by Herbert Girardet; Earthscan 2007; (Wallis was a contributor)
- From old economics to new economics: radical reform and a sustainable future; with Stephen Spratt; New Economics Foundation, 2007

== Personal life ==
In 1974, he married Dee Wallis, who died in 1982. In 1987, he married Mary Jane Wallis and inherited a stepson. He has four daughters, two with Dee and two with Mary Jane.

== Sources ==
- Biography of Stewart Wallis on the website of the Wellbeing Economy Alliance (WEAll): https://wellbeingeconomy.org/who-we-are
- Biography of Stewart Wallis on the website of the New Economics Foundation http://www.neweconomics.org/about/stewart-wallis

== External source ==
- Stewart Wallis interviewed by Edi Lush 28/01/2012 on YouTube
