= Wilhelm Leuschner =

German politician (1890–1944)

Wilhelm Leuschner

Wilhelm Leuschner (15 June 1890, in Bayreuth, Bavaria – 29 September 1944, in Berlin-Plötzensee) was a trade unionist and Social Democratic politician. He was an early opponent of Nazism. After the Machtergreifung of the Nazi regime in 1933, he organized underground resistance in the labour movement. He was one of the members of the 20 July 1944 plot that attempted the assassination of Hitler, was denunciated, arrested the same day, sentenced to death by the Volksgerichtshof (presided over by Roland Freisler) and executed.

== Biography ==
Born in 1890 to stove fitter Wilhelm Friedrich Leuschner and seamstress Maria Barbara Dehler, Leuschner grew up in poverty.

In 1903, he began an apprenticeship as a wood sculptor in Bayreuth and Leipzig. After finishing this in 1907, he joined the trade union and, on the occasion of the Jugendstil (Art Nouveau) Exhibition, he moved to Darmstadt, where he worked in a furniture factory.

In 1910, he joined the Social Democratic Party of Germany (SPD) and became more deeply involved with the union. He also wed Elisabeth Batz in 1911.

After fighting in the First World War on the Eastern Front from 1916-1918, he became a city councillor and Chairman of the Darmstadt Unions in 1919. After the election held on 7 December 1924, he became a member of the de:Landtag des Volksstaates Hessen for the SPD. In 1928, he became Hesse's interior minister. In the Landtag at that time, Leuschner often found himself at odds with jurist and fellow Landtag member Dr. Werner Best, who represented the NSDAP, and would later go on to become very prominent in the Nazi régime. In January 1933, Leuschner was elected to the board of the General German Trade Union Federation.

In April 1933, after the Nazis had seized power in Germany, Leuschner was forced to resign and gave up his office as Hessian Interior Minister. In May 1933, Leuschner was arrested in the course of the Nazis' union-breaking programme. In June 1933, he was arrested once again, mistreated, and held for a year in prisons and concentration camps (Börgermoor and Lichtenburg).

In June 1934, he was released from the concentration camp and began to build up a resistance network. In 1936, he took over a small manufacturing workshop which produced pub utensils, but it soon became the hub of the "illegal Reich leadership of German unions".

Leuschner struggled actively in those resistance groups close to the unions and maintained contact with the Kreisau Circle, and from 1939, also with the resistance group around Carl Friedrich Goerdeler. After the planned coup d'état, Leuschner was most likely to become Germany's vice-chancellor; however, Claus von Stauffenberg's 20 July 1944 attempt on Hitler's life at the Wolf's Lair in East Prussia failed.

Leuschner was arrested on 16 August 1944, and was brought before the Volksgerichtshof, where he was sentenced to death on 8 September 1944. The sentence was carried out on 29 September 1944 at Plötzensee Prison in Berlin.

Numerous schools, streets, and squares are named after Leuschner, including a school in Darmstadt and a square and accompanying underground railway station in Leipzig. As of January 2018, according to Zeit Online, there were 158 streets, paths, and squares in Germany named after Leuschner.

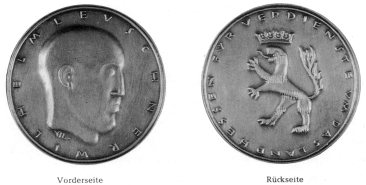
Wilhelm-Leuschner-Medaille

The German state of Hesse awards a medal named de:Wilhelm-Leuschner-Medaille. It is the highest honor awarded by the state of Hesse and was donated on September 29, 1964, by Georg-August Zinn, then Minister-President of Hesse, on the occasion of the 20th anniversary of Wilhelm Leuschner's death.

== See also ==
- List of members of the 20 July plot

== Sources ==
- Biography (in German)
