= Ralf Dahrendorf =

German-British sociologist and politician (1929–2009)

The Right Honourable The Lord Dahrendorf KBE FBA
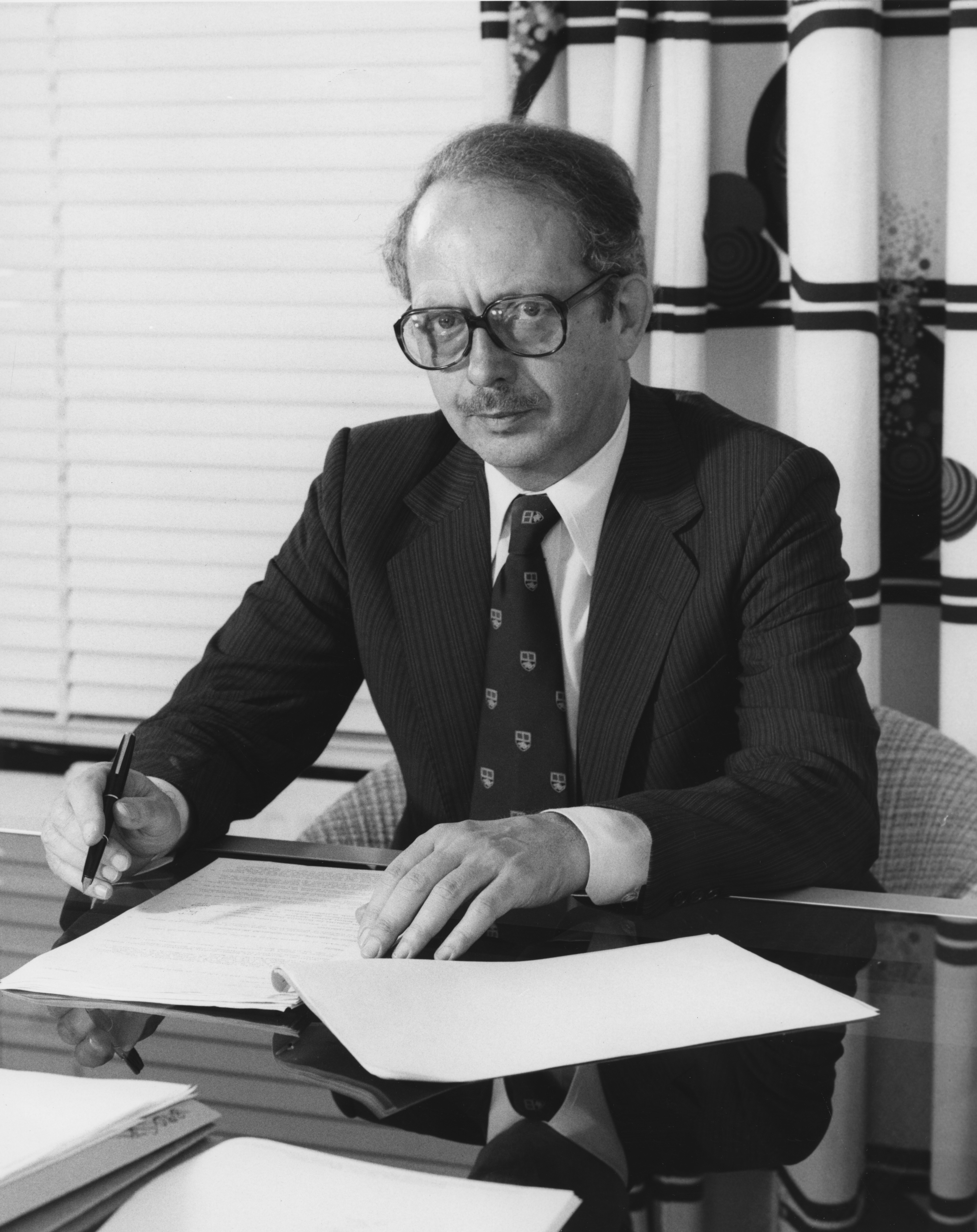
- Dahrendorf in 1980

Member of the House of Lords
- Lord Temporal
- Life peerage 15 July 1993 – 17 June 2009

European Commissioner for Research, Science and Education
- In office 6 January 1973 – 5 January 1977
- President: François-Xavier Ortoli
- Preceded by: Fritz Hellwig
- Succeeded by: Guido Brunner

European Commissioner for Trade
- In office 1 July 1970 – 5 January 1973
- President: Sicco Mansholt; Franco Maria Malfatti
- Preceded by: Jean-François Deniau
- Succeeded by: Christopher Soames

Parliamentary Secretary of State for Foreign Affairs
- In office 22 October 1969 – 2 July 1970
- Chancellor: Willy Brandt
- Preceded by: new appointment
- Succeeded by: Karl Moersch

Member of the Bundestag
- In office 28 September 1969 – 2 July 1970
- Constituency: FDP List

Personal details
- Born: Ralf Gustav Dahrendorf; 1 May 1929 Hamburg, Weimar Republic
- Died: 17 June 2009 (aged 80) Cologne, Germany
- Resting place: Ohlsdorfer Friedhof Ohlsdorf, Hamburg-Nord, Hamburg, Germany
- Citizenship: British; German
- Party: Liberal Democrats (UK); FDP (Germany)
- Spouse(s): Vera Dahrendorf (née Vera Banister); Ellen Dahrendorf (née Ellen Joan Krug) (1980–2004); Christiane Dahrendorf (née Christiane Klebs) (2004–2009)
- Relations: Frank Dahrendorf (Brother)
- Children: Nicola, Alexandra, and Daphne Dahrendorf
- Parent: Lina Dahrendorf (Mother) Gustav Dahrendorf (Father)
- Education: University of Hamburg; London School of Economics
- Profession: Sociologist
- Awards: 1975: elected member of the American Academy of Arts and Sciences, 1977: Honorary Degree (Doctor of Science) awarded by the University of Bath., 1977: elected member of the American Philosophical Society, 1977: elected to the United States National Academy of Sciences, 1982: Knight Commander of the Order of the British Empire, 1989: Grand Cross with Star and Sash of the Order of Merit of the Federal Republic of Germany 1993: Life Peer (Baron Dahrendorf), 1997: Theodor-Heuss-Preis, 1999: Medal of Merit of Baden-Württemberg, 1999: Honorary Senator of the University of Hamburg, 2002: Knight Grand Cross of the Order of Merit of the Italian Republic, 2003: Pour le Mérite

Ralf Dahrendorf
- Known for: Providing a new definition of class conflict based on authority relations

Ralf Gustav Dahrendorf, Baron Dahrendorf, (German pronunciation: [ˈʁalf ˈɡʊstaf ˈdaːʁəndɔʁf]; 1 May 1929 – 17 June 2009) was a German-British sociologist, philosopher, political scientist and liberal politician. A class conflict theorist, Dahrendorf was a leading expert on explaining and analysing class divisions in modern society. Dahrendorf wrote multiple articles and books, his most notable being Class and Conflict in Industrial Society (1959) and Essays in the Theory of Society (1968).

During his political career, he was a Member of the German Parliament, Parliamentary Secretary of State at the Foreign Office of Germany, European Commissioner for Trade, European Commissioner for Research, Science and Education and Member of the British House of Lords, after he was created a life peer in 1993. He was subsequently known in the United Kingdom as Lord Dahrendorf.

He served as director of the London School of Economics and Warden of St Antony's College, University of Oxford. He also served as a professor of sociology at a number of universities in Germany and the United Kingdom and was a research professor at the Berlin Social Science Research Center.

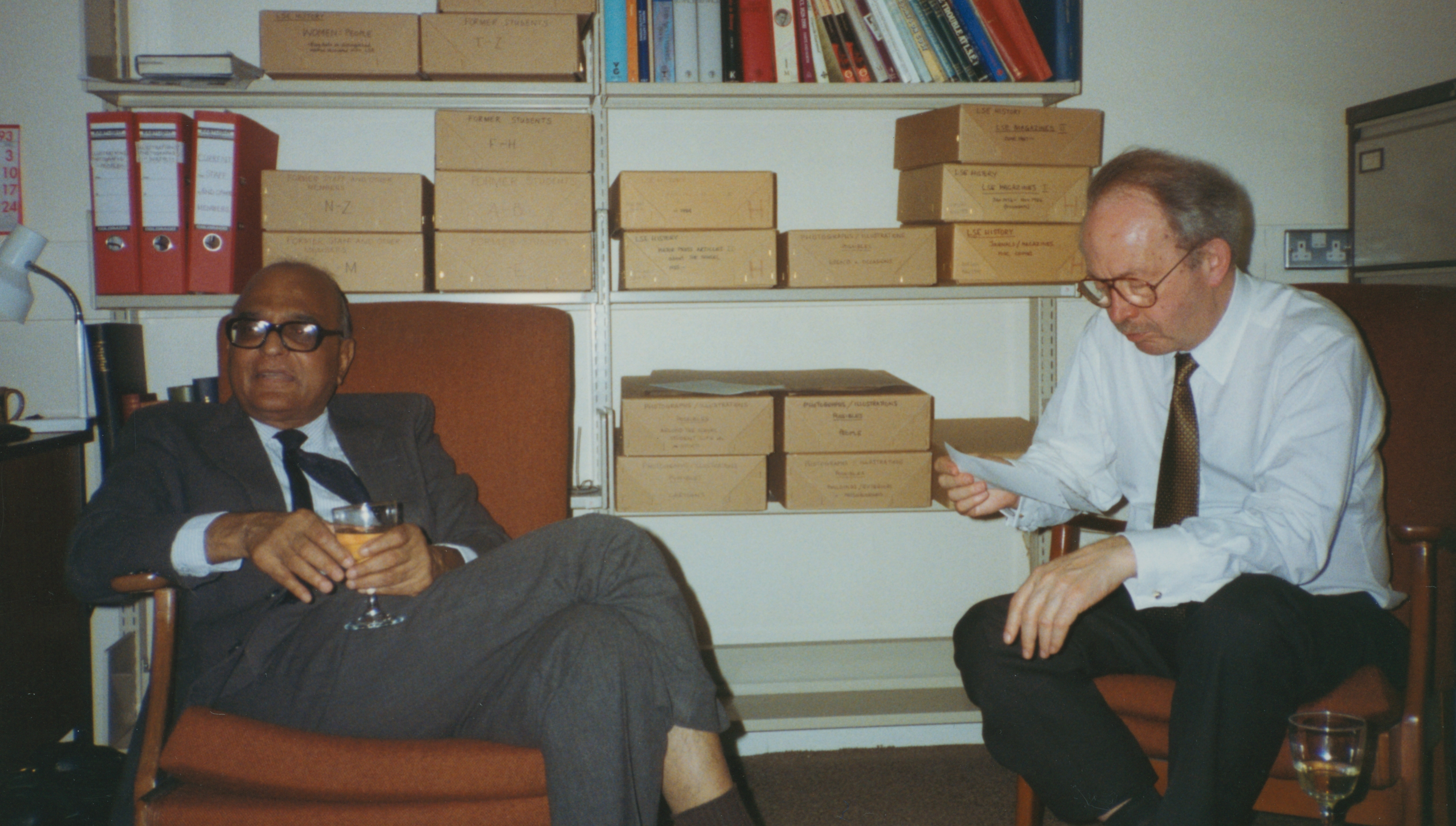
I.G Patel And R.G Dahrendorf, 1993

== Biography ==
=== Family ===
Dahrendorf was born in Hamburg, Germany, on 1 May 1929, the son of Lina and Gustav Dahrendorf and brother of Frank Dahrendorf.

Dahrendorf was known for strongly supporting anti-Nazi activities. As a child, Ralf was a member of the Deutsches Jungvolk, the youngest branch of the Hitler Youth. When Ralf was only a teenager, he and his father, an SPD member of the German Parliament, were arrested and sent to concentration camps for their anti-Nazi activities during the Nazi regime. One of the activities consisted of Dahrendorf distributing leaflets that were encouraging people not to join the regime. After this, his family moved to Berlin. In 1944, during the last year of the Second World War, he was arrested again for engaging in anti-Nazi activities and sent to a concentration camp in Poland. He was released in 1945.

=== Marriages and children ===
Dahrendorf was married three times. He married his first wife, Vera, in 1954. She was a fellow student at the London School of Economics. Together they had three daughters: Nicola, Alexandra and Daphne Dahrendorf. Nicola Dahrendorf has worked for the United Nations and as the West Africa Regional Conflict Adviser to the UK Government.

From 1980 to 2004, he was married to historian and translator Ellen Dahrendorf (née Ellen Joan Krug), the daughter of Professor James Krug. When he was created a peer in 1993, his wife became known as Lady Dahrendorf. Ellen Dahrendorf, who is Jewish, has served on the board of the Jewish Institute for Policy Research, been chair of the British branch of the New Israel Fund, and is a signatory of the Independent Jewish Voices declaration, which is critical of Israeli policies towards the Palestinians.

Dahrendorf's first two marriages ended in divorce. In 2004 he married Christiane Dahrendorf, also known as Lady Christiane Dahrendorf, a medical doctor from Cologne.

=== Education and career ===
Ralf Dahrendorf studied philosophy, classical philology, and sociology at Hamburg University between 1947 and 1952. He continued his academic research at the London School of Economics under Karl Popper as a Leverhulme Research Scholar in 1953–1954, gaining a PhD degree in sociology in 1956. At this early stage in Dahrendorf's academic career, he took an interest in Marxist theory and wrote his PhD thesis on Karl Marx's theory of justice. After completing his doctorate he returned to Germany, where he was a professor of sociology at Hamburg (1957–1960), Tübingen (1960–1964) and Konstanz (1966–1969) universities. He was one of the founders (1964) of the University of Konstanz.

From 1957 to 1959, Dahrendorf talked about "this ability to organize as the principle between quasi-groups and interest groups". Quasi-groups are defined as "those collectives that have latent identical role interests but do not experience a sense of "belongingness". Interest groups, on the other hand, "have a structure, a form of organization, a program or goal, and a personnel of members". The interest groups identity and sense of belonging are produced when people have the ability to communicate, recruit members, form leadership, and create a unifying ideology In 1960, he became a visiting professor of sociology at Columbia University in New York.

From 1967 to 1970, he was Chairman of the German Sociological Association (Deutsche Gesellschaft für Soziologie), resigning it when he took up his office at Brussels. Between 1976 and 1979 he led the educational sub-committee of the Benson Commission.

From 1968 to 1969, Dahrendorf was a member of the Parliament of Baden-Württemberg, and also in 1968, his links with Harvard University began. Dahrendorf decided to become a member of the Bundestag in 1969 during the time when Brandt formed his first SPD-FDP coalition government. After joining, he was appointed parliamentary secretary to the foreign minister. Because he was placed third on the ladder of command in the foreign ministry, he did not enjoy the experience. From 1969 to 1970 he was a member of the German parliament for the Free Democratic Party (the German liberals). During this period he was also a Parliamentary Secretary of State in the Ministry of Foreign Affairs. In 1970 he became a Commissioner in the European Commission in Brussels. He was dedicated to the EU as a guarantor of human rights and liberty.

In 1974, the BBC invited him to present the annual Reith Lectures. In this series of six radio talks, entitled The New Liberty, he examined the definition of freedom.

From 1974 to 1984, Dahrendorf was director of the London School of Economics. Then he returned to Germany to become Professor of Social Science, at Konstanz University (1984–86).

In 1986, Ralf Dahrendorf became a Governor of the London School of Economics. From 1987 to 1997, he was Warden of St Antony's College at the University of Oxford, succeeding the historian Sir Raymond Carr.

In 1982, Dahrendorf was made a Knight Commander of the Order of the British Empire. In 1988, he acquired British citizenship. and became known as Sir Ralf Dahrendorf (as only KBEs who are British subjects are entitled to use that title). On 15 July 1993, he was created a life peer with the title Baron Dahrendorf of Clare Market in the City of Westminster. Clare Market is near the London School of Economics, and is also used for car parking by LSE staff. Dahrendorf chose this name to honour the School in this way, and also as a sign of his liberal humour. He sat in the House of Lords as a cross-bencher.

Between 2000 and 2006, Dahrendorf served as Chairman of the Judging Panel of the FIRST Award for Responsible Capitalism. He received the FIRST Responsible Capitalism lifetime Achievement Award in 2009. Dahrendorf insisted that even the most basic civil rights, including equality and freedom of expression, be given constitutional legitimacy. On 11 July 2007, he was awarded the Prince of Asturias Award for Social Studies.

In January 2005, he was appointed a research professor at the Social Science Research Center Berlin (WZB).

Dahrendorf held dual citizenship in the UK and Germany. After retiring, he lived partly in Germany and partly in the United Kingdom, with one home in London and one in Bonndorf in south-western Germany. When asked which city he considered his home, he once said, "I am a Londoner". He also once said that his life was marked by a conflict between the obligation he felt to the country of his birth, Germany, and the attraction he felt for Britain.

He favoured laws and policies that encouraged personal freedom, a sense of citizenship, and a broadening of social, economic and political opportunities. He argued that Germany's problems stemmed from a belief in absolute answers and in the yearning for an all-powerful leader to put them into effect.

=== Death ===
Dahrendorf died in Cologne, Germany, aged 80, on 17 June 2009, after suffering from cancer.

He was survived by his third wife, three daughters, and one grandchild. His death was confirmed in a statement from Chancellor Angela Merkel, who said, "Europe has lost one of its most important thinkers and intellectuals".

== Concepts ==
=== Class and Class Conflict in Industrial Society ===
In 1959, Dahrendorf published in his most influential work on social inequality, Class and Class Conflict in Industrial Society. Despite later revisions and affirmations of his work, the book still remains his first detailed and most influential account of the problem of social inequality in modern, or post-capitalist societies.

In analysing and evaluating the arguments of structural functionalism and Marxism, Dahrendorf believed that neither theory alone could account for all of society. Marxism did not account for evidence of obvious social integration and cohesion. Structural functionalism, on the other hand, did not focus enough on social conflict. He also asserted that Karl Marx defined class in a narrow and historically specific context. During Marx's time, wealth was the determining factor in attaining power. The wealthy and therefore the powerful ruled, leaving no way for the poor to gain any power or increase their position in society.

Drawing on aspects of both Marxism and structural functionalists to form his own beliefs, Dahrendorf highlighted the changes that have occurred in modern society. Dahrendorf believed in two approaches to society, Utopian and Rationalist. Utopian is the balance of values and solidity and Rationalist is the dissension and disagreement. While he believes that both are social perspectives, the Utopian approach is most apparent in modern-day society, leaving Dahrendorf to create a balance between the two views. Dahrendorf discusses literary utopias to show that the structural-functionalists idea of the social system is utopians in itself because it possess all the necessary characteristics. Specifically, with democracy came voting for political parties, and increased social mobility. He believes that the struggle for authority creates conflict. Money, political power, and social status were all controlled by the same group – the capitalist – which gave the workers little incentive to accept the status quo.

Furthermore, he believes that traditional Marxism ignores consensus and integration in modern social structures. Dahrendorf's theory defined class not in terms of wealth like Marx, but by levels of authority. Dahrendorf combines elements from both of these perspectives to develop his own theory about class conflict in post-capitalist society. Dahrendorf agrees with Marx that authority, in the 19th century, was based on income, and thus the rich bourgeoisie ruled the state. Yet things changed then, where workers formed trade unions and allowed them to negotiate with the capitalist.

=== Class conflict theory ===
Dahrendorf proposed a symbolic model of class conflict with authority as the generic form of domination, combined with a strong systematic view of society and the structuration of class relationships. This new theory is said to have taken place in reaction to structural functionalism and in many ways represents its antithesis. The conflict theory attempts to bring together structural functionalism and Marxism.

According to Dahrendorf, functionalism is beneficial when trying to understand consensus while conflict theory is used to understand conflict and coercion. In order to understand structural functionalism, we study three bodies of work: Davis and Moore, Parsons, and Merton. Dahrendorf states that capitalism has undergone major changes since Marx initially developed his theory on class conflict. The new system of capitalism, known as post-capitalism, is characterised by a diverse class structure and a fluid system of power relations. Thus, it involves a much more complex system of inequality than Marx originally outlined. Dahrendorf contends that post-capitalist society has institutionalised class conflict into state and economic spheres. For example, class conflict has been habituated through unions, collective bargaining, the court system, and legislative debate. In effect, the severe class strife typical of Marx's time is no longer relevant.

Conflict theorists like Dahrendorf often took the exact opposite view of functionalists. Whereas functionalists believe that society was oscillating very slightly, if not completely static, conflict theorists said that "every society at every point is subject to process of change". Conflict theorists believe that there is "dissension and conflict at every point in the social system" and "many societal elements as contributing to disintegration and change". They believe order comes from coercion from those at the top, and that power is an important factor in the social order.

In developing his conflict theory, Dahrendorf recognised consensus theory was also necessary to fully reflect society. Consensus theory focuses on the value integration into society, while conflict theory focuses on conflicts of interest and the force that holds society together despite these stresses. In the past, structural functionalism was the commanding theory in sociology, until the conflict theory came along as its major challenger. However, both structural functionalism and conflict theory have received major criticisms. In fact, Dahrendorf asserted that there has to be consensus to have conflict, as he said that the two were prerequisites for each other. The opposite is also true, he believed –– conflict can result in cohesion and consensus. However, Dahrendorf did not believe the two theories could be combined into one cohesive and comprehensive theory. Instead, Dahrendorf's thesis was "the differential distribution of authority invariably becomes the determining factor of systematic social conflicts". "In the end, conflict theory should be seen as a little more than a transitional development in the history of sociological theory. Although the theory failed because it didn't go far in the direction of Marxian theory, it was still early in the 1950s and 1960s for American sociology to accept a full-fledged Marxian approach. However, conflict theory was helping in setting the stage for the beginning of the acceptance by the late 1960s".

=== The Liberal Order ===
While Dahrendorf acknowledged that liberal market societies are prone to conflicts, he admonished that, at the same time, they were in the best position to handle the conflict. Instead of being suppressed, the tensions become factors that help societies move forward. It's up to governments to turn the tension and conflict into solutions. The need is, then, for conflict management if this is to happen peacefully. Dahrendorf saw conflict in modern societies as stemming from more than just different individual interests and expectations. He saw conflict arising from outgrowing the unavoidable tensions that modern societies have to negotiate and balance between the competing values of justice, liberty, and economic well-being, and between economic efficiency, identity, and security. He sought to understand how societies could develop into just and prosperous nations. The essence of Dahrendorf's ideas about the future of the liberal order is about identifying both latent and manifest tensions at the different levels in which they exist, the potential for conflict, and identifying the options available for solutions and resolving conflict.

=== Authority ===
Dahrendorf opposed those who studied authority on an individual level. He was very critical of those who focused on the psychological or behavioural characteristics of the individuals who occupy such positions. He went even further to say that those who adopted that approach were not sociologists. Dahrendorf believed that Marx's theory could be updated to reflect modern society and Roman society. He rejects Marx's two-class system as too simplistic and overly focused on property ownership. Due to the rise of the joint stock company, ownership does not necessarily reflect control of economic production in modern society. Instead of describing the fundamental differences of class in terms of property, Dahrendorf claims that we must "replace the possession, or non-possession, of effective private property by the exercise of, or exclusion from, authority as the criterion of class formation". A crucial component to Dahrendorf's conflict theory is the idea of authority. Although it initially appears to be an individual issue and psychological, Dahrendorf argues that authority is related to positions and not to individuals. In this way, subordination and authority are products of expectations specified by society, and if those roles are not adhered to, sanctions are imposed. Dahrendorf expands on this idea with the notion that roles of authority may conflict when in different positions that call for different things. According to Dahrendorf, these different defined areas of society where people's roles may be different are called imperatively coordinated associations. The groups of society in different associations are drawn together by their common interests. Dahrendorf explains that latent interests are natural interests that arise unconsciously in conflict between superordinates and subordinates. He defines manifest interests as latent interests when they are realised. In conclusion, Dahrendorf believes that understanding authority to be the key to understanding social conflict.

Dahrendorf, like Merton, looked at latent and manifest interests and further classified them as unconscious and conscious interests. He found the connection between these two concepts to be problematic for the conflict theory. Dahrendorf believed that the basis of class conflict was the division of three groups of society: quasi groups, interest groups, and conflict groups. Thus, society can be split up into the "command class" and the "obey class". The command class exercises authority, and the obey class has no authority and is also subservient to that of others. With a clear interplay between both class types class conflict theory sought to explain that interplay. Quasi groups are "aggregates of incumbents of positions with identical role interests". Interest groups are derived from the quasi groups and they are organised with members, an organisation, and a program or goal. The main difference between quasi-groups and interest groups is that interest groups organise and have a sense of "belonging" or identity. Darhendorf acknowledged that other conditions like politics, adequate personnel, and recruitment would play a role along with the groups. He also believed that under ideal circumstances, conflict could be explained without reference to other variables. Unlike Marx, however, he did not believe that random recruitment into the quasi-group would start a conflict group. In contrast to Lewis Coser's ideas that functions of conflict maintained the status quo, Dahrendorf believed that conflict also leads to change (in social structure) and development. His belief in a changing society separated Dahrendorf's ideas from Marx, who supported the concept of a utopia.

=== Marx and Dahrendorf's perspectives on class formation ===
Marx believed history to be defined as class struggle. He defined class as the difference between the dominating class and those who dominate. He believed that in modern society, there were three types of classes: capitalists, workers and petite bourgeoisie. The proletariat and the bourgeoisie are the pillars in the formation of classes. The Capitalists and bourgeoisie are the ones that own the means of production and are able to purchase the labour of others. The proletariat does not own any means of production or have the ability to purchase labour but can only sell their own. Marx believed that the battle between the different classes formed the concept of class phenomenon.

Marx understood that there are two classes: the rulers who control the means of production and the ruled who work with the means of production. Every society needs both. The conflicts between them causes a destruction of the existing societal order so that it can be replaced by a new one.

On the other hand, Dahrendorf believed that the formation of classes was the organisation of common interests. That further means that people who are in positions of authority are supposed to control subordination, meaning that sanctions could be put into effect against people who fail to obey authority commands, resulting in fines and further punishments. Dahrendorf argues that society is composed of multiple units that are called imperatively coordinated associations. He saw social conflict as the difference between dominating and subject groups in imperatively-coordinated associations.

Marx believed that class formation was based on the ownership of private property. On the contrary, Dahrendorf argued that class formation was always based on authority. He defined authority as a facet of social organisations and as a common element of social structures. There is also another difference between Marx and Dahrendorf concerning the structure of societies. Dahrendorf believed that society had two aspects: consensus and conflict, static and change, order and dissension, cohesion and the role of power, integration and conflict, and lastly consensus and constraint. He saw them all as equally the double aspects of society. On that point, Dahrendorf asserted that society could not survive without both consensus and conflict. He felt that way because without conflict, there can be no consensus, and although consensus leads to conflict, conflict also leads to consensus.

== Criticism ==
The most prevalent criticism of Dahrendorf's conflict theory is that it only takes a macro-sociological perspective. The theory fails to address much of social life. In increasingly modern, multicultural societies, the contested concept and construct of identity received growing emphasis and was the focus of many debates. As a consequence of the debates over identity, and inevitably in a globalising, modern, multicultural world, the issues of citizenship came into play. Specifically, the discussions analysed the ways in which citizenship contributed to the formation and construction of identities. Dahrendorf's adherence to a Marxian position seemingly prevented him from participating in these debates. Absent from Dahrendorf's theory were any significant discussions of culture, and therefore, citizenship and identity.

== Relationship to other classical theorists and perspectives ==
Unlike many of the other works published by social theorists in the 1950s, Dahrendorf's work acknowledges the same class interests that worried Marx. Like Marx, Dahrendorf agreed that conflict is still a basic fact of social life. Dahrendorf believed that class conflict could have beneficial consequences for society, such as progressive change. Dahrendorf is recognised for being one of the best departures from the structural functionalist tradition of the 1950s. Dahrendorf criticised and wanted to challenge the "false, utopian representation of societal harmony, stability, and consensus by the structural functionalist school." Nevertheless, Dahrendorf still shares key ideas with structural functionalists, such as a general faith in the efficacy of political and economic institutions. Like Weber, Dahrendorf criticises Marx's view that the working class will ultimately become a homogeneous group of unskilled machine operators. Dahrendorf points out that in postcapitalist society there are elaborate distinctions regarding income, prestige, skill level, and life chances. Dahrendorf's pluralist view of class and power structures and belief that hierarchies of authority are inevitable in modern societies also reflect Weberian ideas.

== The Ralf Dahrendorf Prize ==
Since 2019, the German Federal Ministry of Education and Research (BMBF) has awarded certain research projects with the Ralf Dahrendorf Prize. The prize honours excellent research and supports the communication of scientific results to the public. Every two years, the BMBF awards prizes to researchers participating in the EU framework programme for research who have achieved exceptional success. The prize awards the winning research project with 50,000 euros, enabling winners to not only continue their research but explore different communication ideas. There is a jury made up of high-class scientists and media personalities that help decide who should receive funding for their projects. The most recent winner of the Ralf Dahrendorf Prize was the Children Born Of War. Children Born Of War – Past, Present, Future, saw researchers from eleven research institutions in the European Union study the life courses of children, fathered by foreign soldiers and born to local mothers, who were conceived during and after armed conflicts – a topic about which families, local communities and entire societies, often remain silent. Examples include children of the occupations during and after the Second World War in Germany and Austria, or children conceived through rape during the Bosnian War.

== Publications in printed in other languages ==
=== Works available in English ===
- Dahrendorf, Ralf. (1959) Class and Class Conflict in Industrial Society. Stanford: Stanford University Press
- Dahrendorf, Ralf. (1968) Essays in the Theory of Society. Stanford: Stanford University Press
- Dahrendorf, Ralf. (1967) Society and Democracy in Germany. New York & London: W. W. Norton & Company
- "The Modern Social Conflict". University of California Press: Berkeley and Los Angeles, 1988
- Dahrendorf, Ralf (1974) The New Liberty BBC Radio Reith Lectures
- Dahrendorf, Ralf. (1975) The Crisis of Democracy, Report on the Governability of Democracies to the Trilateral Commission.Excerpts of remarks by Ralf Dahrendorf on the governability study. NY: New York University Press. ISBN 0-8147-1364-5
- Dahrendorf, Ralf (1990) Reflections on the Revolution in Europe: In a letter intended to have been sent to a gentleman in Warsaw. New York: Random House
- Dahrendorf, Ralf. (1979) Life chances: Approaches to Social and Political Theory. London: Weidenfeld and Nicolson, ISBN 0-297-77682-7

=== Works available in French ===
- Dahrendorf, Ralf. (1972) Classes et conflits de classes dans la société industrielle. (Introduction by Raymond Aron), Paris: Gallimard

=== Works available in German ===
- Gesellschaft und Freiheit: Zur soziologischen Analyse der Gegenwart. Piper, München 1961
- Die angewandte Aufklärung: Gesellschaft u. Soziologie in Amerika. Piper, München 1962
- Homo Sociologicus: ein Versuch zur Geschichte, Bedeutung und Kritik der Kategorie der sozialen Rolle. Westdeutscher Verlag, Köln/Opladen 1965
- Gesellschaft und Demokratie in Deutschland. Piper, München 1965
- Konflikt und Freiheit: auf dem Weg zur Dienstklassengesellschaft. Piper, München 1972, ISBN 3-492-01782-7
- Pfade aus Utopia: Arbeiten zur Theorie und Methode der Soziologie. Piper, München 1974, ISBN 3-492-00401-6
- Lebenschancen: Anläufe zur sozialen und politischen Theorie. Suhrkamp-Taschenbuch, Frankfurt a.M. 1979, ISBN 3-518-37059-6
- Die neue Freiheit: Überleben und Gerechtigkeit in einer veränderten Welt. Suhrkamp, Frankfurt a.M. 1980, ISBN 3-518-37123-1
- Die Chancen der Krise: über die Zukunft des Liberalismus. DVA, Stuttgart 1983, ISBN 3-421-06148-3
- Fragmente eines neuen Liberalismus. DVA, Stuttgart 1987, ISBN 3-421-06361-3
- Der moderne soziale Konflikt: Essay zur Politik der Freiheit. DVA, Stuttgart 1992, ISBN 3-421-06539-X
- Die Zukunft des Wohlfahrtsstaats. Verl. Neue Kritik, Frankfurt a.M. 1996
- Liberale und andere: Portraits. DVA, Stuttgart 1994, ISBN 3-421-06669-8
- Liberal und unabhängig: Gerd Bucerius und seine Zeit. Beck, München 2000, ISBN 3-406-46474-2
- Über Grenzen: Lebenserinnerungen. Beck, München 2002, ISBN 3-406-49338-6
- Auf der Suche nach einer neuen Ordnung: Vorlesungen zur Politik der Freiheit im 21. Jahrhundert. Beck, München 2003, ISBN 3-406-50540-6
- Der Wiederbeginn der Geschichte: vom Fall der Mauer zum Krieg im Irak; Reden und Aufsätze. Beck, München 2004, ISBN 3-406-51879-6
- Werner Bruns, Döring Walter (Hrsg): Der selbstbewusste Bürger. Bouvier Verlag
- Engagierte Beobachter. Die Intellektuellen und die Versuchungen der Zeit, Wien: Passagen Verlag 2005
- Versuchungen der Unfreiheit. Die Intellektuellen in Zeiten der Prüfung . München 2006, ISBN 3-406-54054-6

== Awards and honours ==
- 1975: elected member of the American Academy of Arts and Sciences
- 1977: Honorary Degree (Doctor of Science) awarded by the University of Bath.
- 1977: elected member of the American Philosophical Society
- 1977: elected to the United States National Academy of Sciences
- 1982: Knight Commander of the Order of the British Empire
- 1989: Grand Cross with Star and Sash of the Order of Merit of the Federal Republic of Germany
- 1993: Life Peer (Baron Dahrendorf)
- 1997: Theodor-Heuss-Preis
- 1999: Medal of Merit of Baden-Württemberg
- 1999: Honorary Senator of the University of Hamburg
- 2002: Knight Grand Cross of the Order of Merit of the Italian Republic
- 2003: Pour le Mérite

== See also ==
- Dahrendorf hypothesis
- List of liberal theorists

Political offices
Preceded by Gerhard Jahn	Parliamentary Secretary of State at the German Foreign Office; 1969–1970	Succeeded by Karl Moersch
Preceded by Hans von der Groeben; Fritz Hellwig	German European Commissioner; 1970–1977	Succeeded by Guido Brunner
Preceded by Hans von der Groeben	European Commissioner for External Relations and Trade; 1970–1972	Succeeded by Willy De Clercq
Preceded by Altiero Spinelli	European Commissioner for Research, Science and Education; 1973–1974	Succeeded by Guido Brunner
Preceded by Hans Wolfgang Rubin	Chairman of the Friedrich Naumann Foundation; 1982–1987	Succeeded by Wolfgang Mischnick
Academic offices
Preceded by Theodor W. Adorno	Chairman of the German Society for Sociology; 1967–1970	Succeeded by Erwin K. Scheuch
Preceded by Walter Adams	Director of the London School of Economics; 1974–1984	Succeeded by I. G. Patel
Preceded by Sir Raymond Carr	Warden of St Antony's College, Oxford; 1987–1997	Succeeded by Sir Marrack Goulding
