= Blekinge Institute of Technology =

Higher education institution in Sweden

- Blekinge Tekniska Högskola
- Type: Public Research University
- Established: 1989; 37 years ago
- Chairperson: Peter Örn
- Vice-Chancellor: Henric Johnson
- Academic staff: 289 (2024)
- Administrative staff: 209 (2024)
- Students: 5,900 (2020)
- Location: Karlskrona and Karlshamn, Blekinge, Sweden; 56°10′53″N 15°35′26″E
- Campus: Urban, 2 campuses
- Website: http://www.bth.se
- BTH is a member of EUA - European Universities Association

The Blekinge Institute of Technology (BTH; Swedish: Blekinge Tekniska Högskola) is a public, state funded Swedish institute of technology in Blekinge with 5,900 students (part-time, full-time) and offers about 30 educational programmes in 11 departments at two campuses located in Karlskrona and Karlshamn.

BTH was granted university status in engineering in 1999. Among the many programmes and courses taught in Swedish, BTH offers 12 Master's programmes in English.

The university focuses on ICT information technology and sustainable development; additionally also offers programmes in industrial economics, health sciences and spatial planning.

Blekinge Institute of Technology is located in the Telecom City area and works with telecommunications and software companies including Telenor, Ericsson AB and Wireless Independent Provider (WIP).

== Campuses ==
The university has two Campuses in Blekinge:

- Campus Gräsvik in Karlskrona, from 1989
- Campus Karlshamn, from 2000

The Soft Center Campus in Ronneby existed from 1989 and was integrated in 2010 in the Campus Gräsvik, Karlskrona.

The university had been between 2006 and 2008 included in a strategic alliance with Växjö University and University of Kalmar under the common name of the Academy of the Southeast. The Board, however, decided February 15, 2008 not to join in the fusion the other two parties, which resulted in the founding of Linnaeus University.

Blekinge Institute of Technology is a member of the European University Association, the European Society of Engineering Education and the Association of Technical Universities in Scandinavia (NORDTEK).

== Academics ==
=== Applied Information Technology ===
The institute offers Bachelor, Master and PhD programmes oriented towards applied Informatics. BTH has been ranked 6th in the world in Systems and Software Engineering research. Admission to graduate programs is among the most competitive in Sweden due to having the highest number of international applicants. The faculty of the School of Computing consists of 11 full professors and 50 PhD students, among those are high-profile researchers such as

- Claes Wohlin,
- Nail H. Ibragimov, widely regarded as one of the world's foremost experts in the field of symmetry analysis of differential equations.

A European Master on Software Engineering program is given in collaboration with Technical University of Madrid (Spain), University of Kaiserslautern (Germany) and Free University of Bozen-Bolzano (Italy).

=== Sustainable Development ===
The Institute uniquely offers two Masters programs and a PhD program in Strategic Sustainable Development (SSD), a scientifically robust and strategic framework to systematically contribute to sustainable development through trust-building, purposeful practices. The Blekinge Institute of Technology contributed significantly to the development of Strategic Sustainable Development. Leading figures of the Scandinavian sustainability movement, such as Karl-Henrik Robèrt, teach and research at the institute. In cooperation with Lund University the Centre for Innovation, Research and Competence in the Learning Economy (CIRCLE) was established in 2004. Today CIRCLE is the largest national research Centre of Excellence by the Swedish Governmental Agency for Innovation Systems.

The latest (2008) report from the Engineering Education for Sustainable Development Observatory (EESD-Observatory) ranked Blekinge Institute of Technology's programme on Strategic Sustainable Development as the best among Swedish technical universities and third among the 56 evaluated European universities, with a grade of 8.4 out of 10.

Through a planning grant from the Swedish International Development Cooperation Agency (SIDA), BTH and NJU explored the possibilities for cooperation in the field of sustainable development.

== See also ==
- ESDP-Network
- List of colleges and universities in Sweden
