= Strategic sustainable investing =

Investment strategy

Strategic sustainable investing (SSI) is an investment strategy that recognizes and rewards leading companies that are moving society towards sustainability. SSI relies on a consensus-based scientific definition of sustainability, and the assumption that ‘Backcasting from Principles of Sustainability’, whereby a vision of a sustainable future is set as the reference point for developing strategic actions, is the preferred approach to strategically move a company towards sustainability. It was developed by researchers at the Blekinge Institute of Technology in Sweden.

== The strategic sustainable investment system ==
SSI outlines that the financial investment will offer a competitive risk-adjusted return, while providing investment capital to companies that are actively attempting to become more sustainable. It implies lower exposure to sustainability-related risks and it considers financial metrics together with environmental, social, and governance (ESG) aspects, as well as strategy analyses to educate investment decision-making.

Characteristics of SSI:
• Lower sustainability risk exposure
• A definition of sustainability based on scientific consensus
• Primarily driven by movement towards sustainability
• Considers financial, ESG, and strategy analysis

SSI operates by prioritizing investment capital allocation to companies that are taking the lead in shifting away from unsustainable behaviour towards new ways of doing business. This capital allocation will provide an incentive for companies to move forward in a sustainable direction. This movement is reported in corporate social responsibility (CSR) and other extra-financial reports, but is also recorded in traditional areas of a firm's financial balance sheets.

By incorporating sustainability investment and returns into traditional financial reporting, a clearer picture of the bottom-line impact of a company's actions towards sustainability is made available. In this positive reinforcing loop, greater investor returns and increased movement towards sustainability are generated with every cycle.

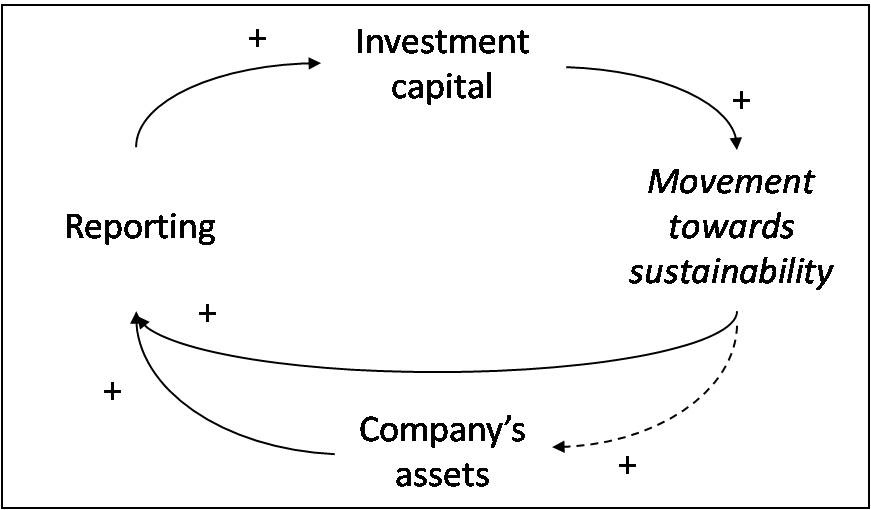
Causal loop diagram illustrating the strategic sustainable investment

Institutional investors, such as mutual and pension funds, take a longer-term position on investments and are thus ideally suited to incorporate SSI strategies.

== Theory background ==
The theoretical foundation of SSI is strongly linked to strategic sustainable development, made popular by The Natural Step and its founder Dr. Karl-Henrik Robèrt.

This strategy resembles socially responsible investing (SRI), a growing practice amongst ethical investors. Nevertheless, SSI recognizes the gaps of SRI pointed by several academics and practitioners and presents some alternatives.

Main differences between traditional investment strategies, SRI and SSI:

	Traditional	SRI	SSI
Sustainability definition	sustainability is not considered	Lack of clear definition	A definition based on scientific consensus
Primary driver	Maximize Return on Investment	Ethical values	Movement towards sustainability
Analysis performed	Financial analysis	ESG analysis Financial analysis	ESG analysis Financial analysis Strategy analysis
Sustainability risk exposure	Higher exposure	Variable exposure	Lower exposure

== SSI analysis tool ==
The SSI analysis tool measures a company's strategy for addressing sustainability. It allows investors to recognize which companies are leading the transition in a new direction, and which are most likely to be strong performers in tomorrow's market.

This tool is divided in two main parts: the emerging sustainability issue (esi) chart and the strategy analysis component:

=== ESI chart ===
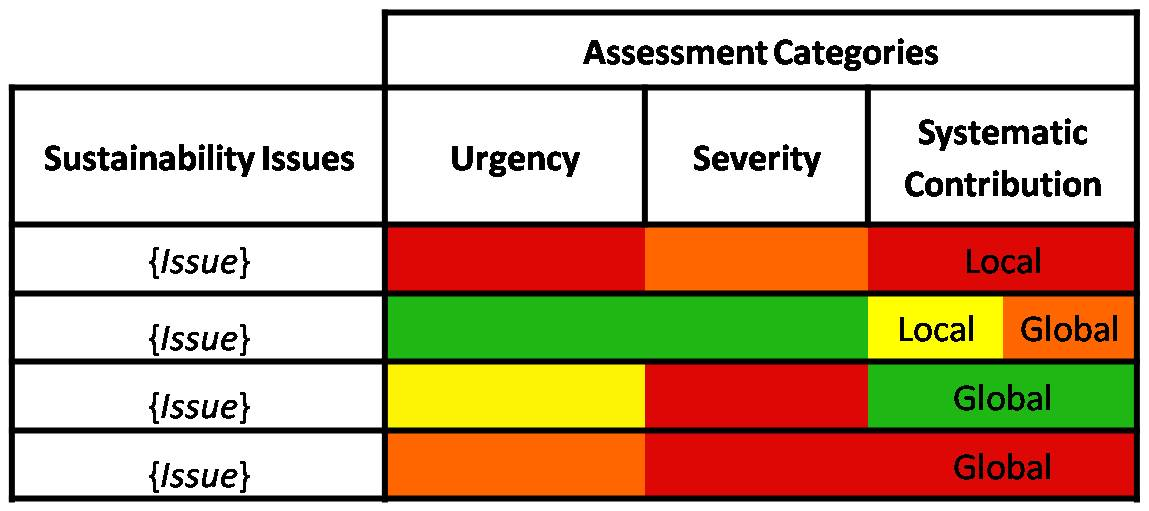
ESI Chart Sample

The Sectoral Emerging Sustainability Issue (ESI) chart is used to identify which aspects of a determined market sector will become a socio-environmental problem. In the common sense, an issue is called ‘emergent’ when it gets media exposure. Instead, the Tool relies on scientific Principles of sustainability to identify what is emergent.

It exposes which Sustainability Issues present high risks for companies within that sector in the short-term; as well as which Issues will be emerging in the medium and long-terms. Due to differences within a sector, the Sectoral ESI Chart should be made as specific as needed, being flexible to account for various geographical locations and sub-sector subtleties.

The process of composing an ESI chart follows:

Once a sector is selected for an ESI analysis, a list of relevant sustainability issues is assembled. This baseline analysis will result in a list of issues outlining the subject sector's strengths and concerns that impact society and the environment. Next, prioritization colours are assigned to each sustainability issue: red for very high priority; orange for high priority; yellow for medium priority, and green for low priority according to its assessment in each of three categories: urgency, severity, and systematic contribution.

Urgency assesses the time frame pressing each Issue. The severity assesses the seriousness of the Issue, in terms of its potential consequences for the environment, society, and companies within that sector. The systematic contribution is used to gauge the sector's contribution to the overall Issue.

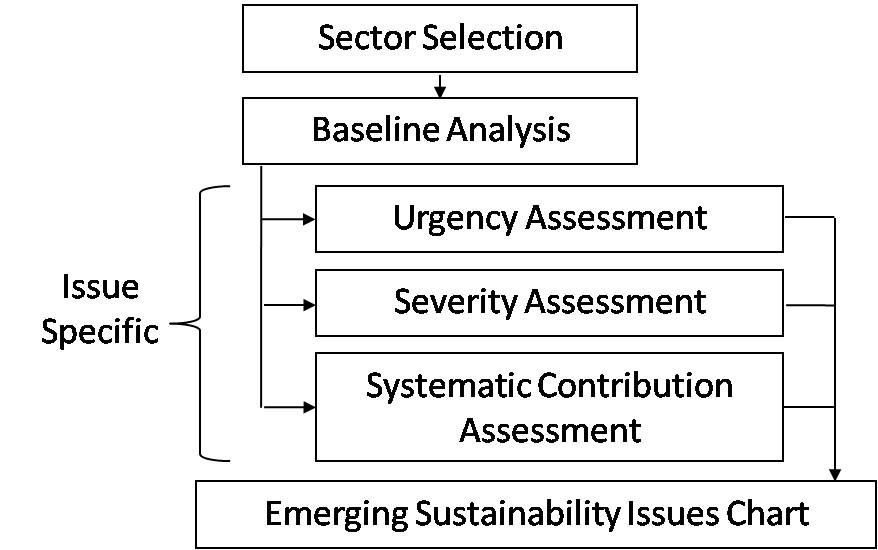

To fill out the Chart, Researchers follow this process flow.

=== Strategy analysis component ===
==== Strategic plan ====
The Strategic Plan element assesses the subject company's planned goals in relation to the emerging sustainability issue (ESI). The qualitative description includes, but is not limited to, information regarding: public commitments planned operational and business initiatives, political action/ lobbying, and third party partnerships (with NGOs, consultative firms etc.). There is also a comment on the subject company's core business in relation to the ESI; as this will assist in determining the subject company's exposure to the emerging risk.

==== Strategic actions ====
The strategic actions element looks at assessing the subject company's recent actions taken in relation to the emerging sustainability issue (ESI), thus determining whether the subject company is ‘walking the talk’ in comparison to the vision and goals outlined. The subject company's actions are seen through the lens of strategic sustainable development, and thus three questions are emphasized as a mental guideline:

a. Does this action provide a competitive return on investment (ROI)?
b. Is this action taking the subject company in the right direction?
c. Is this action a versatile platform?

==== Strategy analysis graph ====
The strategy analysis graph shows the subject company's planned path for dealing with the ESI, tangible progress made, and if existent, government regulations. The trajectory of the subject company's planned path reveals the extent of their future risk exposure. This graph is placed in the center of the strategy analysis page.

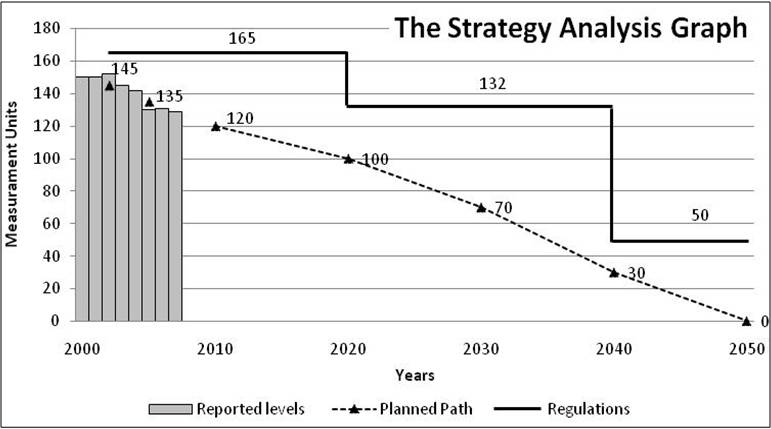
Sample of strategy analysis graph

==== Assurance assessment ====
The assurance assessment provides an overall impression of the validity of the information gathered. This assessment may be applied if the data is verified by an external third party, or if discrepancy is evident between different sources of information used on the report.
