= Sergey Utyuzhnikov =

- Born: Sergey Vladimirovich Utyuzhnikov; 31 August 1960 (age 66); Nerchinsk, Chita Oblast, Russian SFSR, Soviet Union
- Education: Moscow Institute of Physics and Technology
- Known for: Numerical modelling of supersonic flows, thermic dynamics, noise suppression, turbulence modelling, multiobjective optimisation
- Scientific career
- Fields: Computational mathematics, computational aerodynamics
- Workplaces: Moscow Institute of Physics and Technology; University of Manchester

Sergey Vladimirovich Utyuzhnikov (Russian: Сергей Владимирович Утюжников; born 31 August 1960, Nerchinsk) is a Russian and British scientist in the field of computational mathematics and aerodynamics, professor of computational mathematics; professor at the Moscow Institute of Physics and Technology and the University of Manchester.

== Biography ==
Sergey Utyuzhnikov was born on 31 August 1960 in Nerchinsk, Chita Oblast (now Zabaykalsky Krai). In 1977, having graduated from the physics and mathematics boarding school named after Academician M. A. Lavrentyev in Novosibirsk Akademgorodok, he entered the Moscow Institute of Physics and Technology (MIPT). He graduated from MIPT with honours (1st-class) in 1983 under a six-year programme.

In 1986, he completed his postgraduate studies at MIPT and defended his candidate dissertation (PhD) "A numerical method for solving the full equations of the viscous shock layer" in the specialty 01.01.07 (Computational and Numerical Mathematics).

He worked at MIPT successively as a Senior Researcher (1986–1988), Assistant Professor (1989–1992), Associate Professor (1992–1998) and Professor (1998–2004). In 1997, he defended his doctoral dissertation (DSc, a professorial level in Russia) "Numerical study of gas flows induced by supersonic motion of bodies in the atmosphere" in the specialty 05.13.16. In 1999, he was awarded the academic title of Professor in Computational Mathematics by the Ministry of Education of Russia.

Since 1999, he has been working in the United Kingdom: he was a visiting professor at UMIST (2001–2004), a senior research fellow at Cranfield University (2004–2005), and then a senior research fellow at the University of Manchester (2005–2016). Since 2016, he has been a Reader at the University of Manchester, where he also served as the Programme Director of the MSc Aerospace Engineering Programme.

From 2011 to 2015, he was a leading visiting scientist at MIPT under the "Megagrants" programme, where he led the creation of the Laboratory of Mathematical Modelling of Nonlinear Processes in Gaseous Media.

== Research ==
=== Research areas ===
His research interests include computational fluid dynamics, hypersonic flows, turbulence modelling, domain decomposition methods, active noise suppression, multiobjective optimisation, geophysics and the design of space vehicles.

=== Key results ===
Utyuzhnikov, together with co-authors, developed a highly efficient numerical method for modelling supersonic flows of viscous gas around blunt bodies. He obtained fundamental results on the dynamics of large-scale thermics in the atmosphere and was the first to show the infeasibility of the concept of "nuclear winter" in its original formulation. Together with his students, he carried out the first three-dimensional numerical simulation of the collision of the Tunguska meteorite with the Earth's atmosphere (1999) and of the impact of the comet Shoemaker–Levy 9 with Jupiter.

In the 2000s, while working in the United Kingdom, he developed original domain decomposition methods for modelling near-wall turbulent flows, methods for constructing the Pareto front in multiobjective optimisation and active noise suppression.

He is the author and co-author of more than 180 peer-reviewed papers. He has supervised 8 candidates of sciences in Russia and 12 PhD students in the United Kingdom.

== Membership and Editorial work ==
He was an elected member of the Academic Council of MIPT and the Phystech School of Applied Mathematics and Informatics. He is a member of the editorial boards of the journals Computational Mathematics and Mathematical Physics, Cogent Mathematics and Statistics, Aeronautics and Aerospace Open Access Journal, Global Journal of Engineering Sciences, Research in Mathematics and Modelling, Sound and Vibration.

He is a Fellow of the Institute of Mathematics and Its Applications (FIMA) since 2007.

== Selected publications ==
- Utyuzhnikov S. V. (1986). "Численный метод решения уравнений вязкого ударного слоя". Doklady Akademii Nauk SSSR. 290 (5): 1058–1062.
- Rudenko D. V., Utyuzhnikov S. V. (1999). "Газодинамические последствия взрыва тунгусского космического тела". Математическое моделирование. 11 (10): 49–61.
- Laurence D. R., Uribe J. C., Utyuzhnikov S. V. (2005). "A robust formulation of the v2-f model". Flow, Turbulence and Combustion. 73 (3): 169–185.
- Utyuzhnikov S. V. (2008). "Robin-type wall functions and their numerical implementation". Applied Numerical Mathematics. 58 (10): 1521–1533.
- Utyuzhnikov S. V., Fantini P., Guenov M. D. (2009). "A method for generating a well-distributed Pareto set in nonlinear multiobjective optimization". Journal of Computational and Applied Mathematics. 223 (2): 820–841.
- Utyuzhnikov S. V., Tirskiy G. A. (2014). Hypersonic Aerodynamics and Heat Transfer. Begell House. ISBN 978-1-56700-309-3.
- Utyuzhnikov S. V. (2017). "A practical algorithm for real-time active sound control with preservation of interior sound". Computers & Fluids. 157: 175–181.
- Katrutsa A., Utyuzhnikov S., Oseledets I. (2023). "Extension of Dynamic Mode Decomposition for dynamic systems with incomplete information based on t-model of optimal prediction". Journal of Computational Physics. 476: 1–10.
