= Charles Edquist =

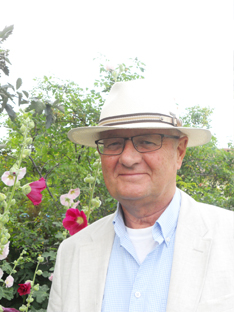
- Born: Sweden
- Other name: Charles Edqvist
- Education: B.A. in Lund University; MA in University of California at Berkeley; Ph.D. in Lund University
- Occupation: Researcher
- Known for: Innovation, Systems of Innovation Approach, Swedish Paradox, and Innovation Policy
- Website: www.charlesedquist.com

Charles Edquist is a Swedish researcher in Innovation, one of the founders and the first Director (2004–2011) of CIRCLE (the Centre for Innovation Research and Competence in the Learning Economy) at Lund University, Sweden, and the holder of the Ruben Rausing Chair in Innovation Research at CIRCLE. Some of his most noted research contributions have been on the 'Systems of Innovation approach', the 'Swedish Paradox' and 'Innovation Policy'. His early contributions to the 'public procurement for innovation' literature are among his most cited works to date.

== Educational background ==
Edquist studied for his BA in statistics, Economics and Economic History at Lund University, Sweden, and followed this with an MA in economics at the University of California at Berkeley, USA, and a PhD in Economic History at Lund University. His docent (habilitation) qualification was obtained at Umeå University, Sweden.

== Positions ==
In 1987 Edquist was appointed professor of technology and social change at Linköping University. In 2003 he moved from there to Lund University, where he became the first holder of the Ruben Rausing Chair in Innovation at Lund University's Department of Design Sciences. A year later he became the first director of CIRCLE. He has also worked at UC Berkeley (1973–74 and 1991–92), SPRU (Sussex), CRIC (Manchester), ISEG (Lisbon) and IFRIS (Paris) from Oct 2011 to May 2012.

== Academic and policy activity ==
As Director of CIRCLE, he facilitated the expansion of the research staff from zero to forty researchers representing 15 disciplines from diverse cultural backgrounds (12 nationalities). By 2011, CIRCLE had developed into one of the largest European centers for research and policy advice in the fields of innovation, research policy and entrepreneurship.

His work has influenced innovation policy and strategy in Sweden and Europe, a result of his stints as an advisor, on various occasions and durations, to governments, international organizations and firms including the OECD, UNIDO, EU, UNCTAD, ILO, UNDP, UNESCO, and the Finnish Government; Swedish organizations such as VINNOVA, Nutek, and the Ministry of Industries; and firms such as SAAB Aerospace, Astra-Zeneca, Volvo Trucks, and Sweco Eurofutures. During 2011–2012, he was a Member of the Research Policy Advisory Committee to the Swedish Government chaired by Sweden's Deputy Prime Minister and Minister for Education, Jan Björklund.

One of his current projects is the Rausing Project on Innovation Processes and Policies. It addresses theoretical, empirical and policy-oriented dimensions within innovation systems, and focuses on the determinants, consequences and the measurement of innovation; it also deals with the theory, rationales, objectives, instruments and practices of innovation policies.

In September 2013 his paper with Prof. Susana Borrás received the best paper award at the biannual conference at the Atlanta Conference on Science & Innovation Policy (http://www.atlantaconference.org/), at The Georgia Institute of Technology.

On 24 February 2015, Charles was appointed to become a member of the Swedish National Innovation Council, with Swedish Prime Minister Stefan Löfven as chair. The Council consists of 5 government ministers and 10 external members from different sectors of society.

== Selected publications ==
1. Borrás, S and Edquist, C. (2015): Education, training and skills in innovation policy Science and Public Policy Vol. 42, Nr. 2, pp. 215–227 https://doi.org/10.1093/scipol/scu043
2. Borrás, Susana and Edquist, Charles (2013): "The choice of innovation policy instruments". Technological Forecasting and Social Change. Vol 80 (8): 1513–1522. https://doi.org/10.1016/j.techfore.2013.03.002
3. Edquist, Charles; Zabala-Iturriagagoitia, Jon Mikel (2012). "Public Procurement for Innovation as mission-oriented innovation policy". Research Policy. 41 (10): 1757–69. doi:10.1016/j.respol.2012.04.022.
4. Edquist, Charles; Zabala-Iturriagagoitia, Jon Mikel (2012). "Why Pre-commercial Procurement is not Innovation Procurement" (PDF). Charles Edquist. CIRCLE, Lund University.
5. Edquist, C., and Hommen, L. (eds.) (2008), 'Small Country Innovation Systems: Globalization, change, and policy in Asia and Europe' also in Chinese by Science Press (Beijing) (2012).
6. Edquist, Charles (2011). "Design of innovation policy through diagnostic analysis: identification of systemic problems (or failures)" (PDF). Charles Edquist. Industrial and Corporate Change.
7. Edquist, C., Luukkonen, T., and Sotarauta, M. 'Broad-based Innovation Policy, sub-report in Evaluation of the Finnish National Innovation System – Full Report,’ Helsinki, 2009.
8. Arvidsson, G., Bergström, H., Edquist, C., Högberg, D., and Jönsson, B. (2007), 'Medicin för Sverige – Nytt liv i en framtidsbransch' (Medicine for Sweden – New life into a sector of the future), SNS publishers.
9. Fulton, O., Santiago, P., Edquist, C., El-Khawas, E., and Hackl, E. (2007), 'Thematic Review of Tertiary Education: Poland', Organization for Economic Co-operation and Development (OECD), Directorate for Education, Education and Training Policy Division.
10. Edquist, C. (2005), 'Systems of Innovation: Perspectives and Challenges', in Fagerberg, J., Mowery, D., and Nelson, R. (eds.). Oxford Handbook of Innovation, Oxford University Press, Oxford.
11. Edquist, C. (ed.) (2003), 'The Internet and Mobile Telecommunications System of Innovation: Developments in Equipment, Access and Content', Edward Elgar Publishing, Cheltenham, UK.
12. Edquist, C. (2002), 'Innovationspolitik för Sverige – mål, skäl, problem och åtgärder' (Objectives, Rationales, Problems and Measures –for the Swedish Ministry of Industry in Swedish and published by VINNOVA), Stockholm.
13. Edquist, C., Hommen, L., and McKelvey, M. (2001), 'Innovation and Employment: Process versus Product Innovation'. Edward Elgar Publishing, Cheltenham, UK.
14. Edquist, C. (ed.) (1997), 'Systems of Innovation: Technologies, Institutions and Organizations, London', Pinter Publishers/Cassell Academic.
