= Nail H. Ibragimov =

Russian mathematician and mathematical physicist

Nail Hairullovich Ibragimov (Russian: Наиль Хайруллович Ибраги́мов, January 18, 1939 – November 4, 2018) was a Russian mathematician and mathematical physicist. At his death he was a professor emeritus at the Blekinge Institute of Technology. Ibragimov's research area was differential calculus, group analysis and mathematical physics. He was the author of many books on mathematics and mathematical physics.

== Early life and education ==
Ibragimov was born on January 18, 1939, in Urussu, in the Soviet Union (now in the Republic of Tatarstan in the Russian Federation). He later dedicated the first volume of his selected works to Larisa Petrovna Barkhat, one of his schoolteachers in Urussu, and to the other teachers there.

After Army service, he entered the Moscow Institute of Physics and Technology, but then transferred to Akademgorodok and then to Novosibirsk State University, from which he graduated in 1965. He completed a Ph.D. in 1967 in the Lavrentyev Institute of Hydrodynamics of the Siberian Branch of the Russian Academy of Sciences in Novosibirsk. His dissertation, Group properties of some differential equations, was supervised by Lev Ovsyannikov. He completed his Doktor nauk degree in 1973 in the Sobolev Institute of Mathematics, with the dissertation Lie groups in some problems of mathematical physics.

== Career and later life ==
From Novosibirsk, Ibragimov moved in 1980 to Ufa, where he directed a laboratory in mathematical physics in the Ufa Scientific Center of the Russian Academy of Sciences. At the same time, he worked as a professor of mathematics at the Ufa State Aviation Technical University, where he became chair of applied mathematics in 1984. In 1987 he returned to Moscow, where he held a position at the Keldysh Institute of Applied Mathematics and lectured at the Moscow Institute of Physics and Technology.

From 1992, he worked abroad. From 1992 to 1994 he was at Istanbul Technical University in Turkey. From 1994 to 2000 he was in South Africa, first at the University of the Witwatersrand in Johannesburg and beginning in 1997 at the University of Bophuthatswana. His last position was at the Blekinge Institute of Technology in Sweden, starting in 2000. Yvonne Choquet-Bruhat recalls that he moved from Johannesburg because his wife and daughters found life there "excessively difficult" compared to the "smaller and more peaceful" town of Mmabatho and its University of Bophuthatswana, where she visited him. In turn, she suggested to Maurice A. de Gosson that Ibragimov be invited as a speaker to an international conference in Sweden, and this led to his position working with Gosson at Blekinge.

He died on November 4, 2018, in Sweden.

== Books ==
Ibragimov's books include:

- Групповые свой ства некоторых дифференциальных уравнений [Group properties of certain differential equations], Izdat. "Nauka" Sibirsk. Otdel., 1967
- Группы Ли в некоторых вопросах математической физики [Lie groups in some problems of mathematical physics], Novosibirsk. Gos. Univ., 1972
- Lie-Bäcklund transformations in applications, with Robert L. Anderson, SIAM Studies in Applied Mathematics 1, 1979
- Группы преобразований в математической физике, Nauka, 1983; translated as Transformation groups applied to mathematical physics, Reidel, 1985
- Опыт группового анализа обыкновенных дифференциальных уравнений [The experience of group analysis of ordinary differential equations], Znanie, 1991
- CRC handbook of Lie group analysis of differential equations, in three volumes with multiple other authors, CRC Press, 1994–1996
- Elementary Lie group analysis and ordinary differential equations, Wiley Series in Mathematical Methods in Practice 4, 1999
- Approximate and renormgroup symmetries, with Vladimir F. Kovalev, Nonlinear Physical Science, Springer, 2009
- Symmetries of integro-differential equations, with applications in mechanics and plasma physics, with Grigoriev, Kovalev, and Meleshko, Lecture Notes in Physics 806, Springer, 2010
- A practical course in differential equations and mathematical modelling: Classical and new methods, nonlinear mathematical models, symmetry and invariance principles, Higher Education Press and World Scientific, 2010; translated into German as Differentialgleichungen und Mathematische Modellbildung, Eine praxisnahe Einführung unter Berücksichtigung der Symmetrie-Analyse, De Gruyter, 2018. Also translated into Swedish, Chinese, and Russian.
- Applications of Lie group analysis in geophysical fluid dynamics, with Ranis N. Ibragimov, Series on Complexity, Nonlinearity and Chaos 2, World Scientific and Higher Education Press, 2011
- Transformation groups and Lie algebras, Higher Education Press and World Scientific, 2010
- Tensors and Riemannian geometry, with applications to differential equations, De Gruyter and Higher Education Press, 2015
