= Eco-town =

Eco-town or ecotown may refer to:

- Eco-municipality, a specific form of eco-town where ecological principles are formally incorporated into the conduct of local government
- Eco-towns, proposed programme of new towns in England

See also

- Ecovillage, an ecologically sustainable community
- Sustainable city, or ecocity
