= SCALARE =

The research project SCALARE (SCALing softwARE) is a European ITEA 2 project.

The aim of the international project SCALARE is to develop a Scaling Management Framework (SMF). The SMF is envisaged to be a roadmap for all organizations to guide them in growing their software delivery capacity. The key motivation for the project is the observation that all companies are becoming increasingly dependent on software, in particular traditional hardware-focused companies. The project partners all encounter different types of challenges in scaling up their capacity to deliver software. The project aims to identify these challenges, identify the common approaches taken and offered in the scientific software engineering literature and to offer a systematic approach to implement these approaches.

Project data
Supporting organisations: ITEA2, Enterprise Ireland, VINNOVA
Duration: 01.12.2013 - 1.12.2016

== General information ==
The main objective of SCALARE is to support the software industry in scaling their software delivery capacity. The term scaling is used not only in the traditional sense, namely the size of software systems expressed in lines of code, but also to scale in two other dimensions: the processes and methods used to deliver software systems, and the organizations that deliver software.

=== Technical and Scientific Objectives of SCALARE ===
1. Establishment of Software scaling as a multi-dimensional phenomenon.
2. Develop a pattern language for Scaling Software.
3. Study how scaling software happens in practice through industry case studies.
4. Demonstrate the use of the SCALARE pattern language and the Scaling Management Framework.
5. Support organizations to grow their software delivery capacity.

=== Participants ===
- Aalto University
- Addalot
- Tieto Sweden
- Kugler-Maag Cie
- QUMAS
- Goshido
- Lero, the Irish Software Research Centre
- Telvent
- Husqvarna
- Lund University
- Sigrun
- Softhouse
- Sony Mobile

=== Work Packages and Tasks ===
- WP 1: Scaling Management Framework
- WP 2: Scaling Products, Systems and Services
- WP 3: Scaling Organizations and Business Domains
- WP 4: Scaling Processes and Methods
- WP 5: Project Management and Dissemination

== Main results ==
=== The Scaling Management Framework ===
One of the main results of the project is the definition of a Scaling Management Framework. It is a model that addresses the questions and challenges organizations face when they need to transform their software development in order to meet new business requirements.

The SMF consists of the following main parts:

- Business drivers
- Current abilities
- Software model
- Wanted abilities

Scaling is affected by the business drivers for the organization and the development. The current abilities of the organization is described in terms of observable characteristics, like lead time, quality and effort. The wanted abilities are defined based on the business drivers and the current abilities.

The software model describes the development in terms of the product view, the organization view, and the process view. A main feature of the SMF is that transformations always are analysed with respect to all these dimensions.

== Project Publications ==
1. U. Asklund, M. Höst, K. Wnuk (2016) Experiences from Monitoring Effects of Architectural Changes, in proceedings of Software Quality Days, Vienna, Austria
2. K. Wnuk, J. Kabbedijk, S. Brinkkemper, B. Regnell and D. Callele (forthcoming) Exploring Factors Affecting Decision Outcome and Lead-time in Large-Scale Requirements Engineering, Journal of Software Maintenance and Evolution.
3. K. Stol and B. Fitzgerald (2015) Inner Source — Adopting Open Source Development Practices within Organizations: A Tutorial, IEEE Software, vol. 32.
4. M. Michlmayr, B. Fitzgerald, and K. Stol (2015) Why and How Should Open Source Projects Adopt Time-Based Releases?, IEEE Software, vol. 32(2). (Special Issue on Release Engineering)
5. C. Lindholm, J. Pedersen Notander, M. Höst (2014) A case study on software risk analysis and planning in medical device development, Software Quality Journal 22(3) pp. 469–497
6. A. Orucevic-Alagic and M. Höst (2014) Network Analysis of a Large Scale Open Source Project, Euromicro Conference on Software Engineering and Advanced Applications (SEAA)
7. K. Wnuk, L. Ahlberg and J. Persson (2014) On the Delicate Balance between RE and Testing: Experiences from a Large Company, IEEE 1st International Workshop on Requirements Engineering and Testing (RET)
8. B. Fitzgerald and K. Stol (2014) Continuous Software Engineering and Beyond: Trends and Challenges, First International Workshop on Rapid Continuous Software Engineering (RCoSE) co-located with ICSE’14, Hyderabad, India
9. K. Stol and B. Fitzgerald (2014) Researching Crowdsourcing Software Development: Perspectives and Concerns, First International Workshop on Crowdsourcing in Software Engineering (CSI-SE) co-located with ICSE’14, Hyderabad, India
10. B. Fitzgerald, M Musiał and K Stol (2014) Evidence-Based Decision Making in Lean Software Project Management, 36th International Conference on Software Engineering (Software Engineering in Practice track), Hyderabad, India
11. K. Stol and B. Fitzgerald (2014) Two’s Company, Three’s a Crowd: A Case Study of Crowdsourcing Software Development, Proceedings of the 36th International Conference on Software Engineering
12. K. Stol, P. Avgeriou, M.A. Babar, Y. Lucas and B. Fitzgerald (2014) Key Factors for Adopting Inner Source, ACM Transactions on Software Engineering and Methodology. Vol. 23(2)
13. M. Höst, K Stol and A Oručević-Alagić (2014) Inner Source Project Management, in: G Ruhe & C Wohlin, Project Management in a Changing World, Springer
14. B. Fitzgerald, K. Stol, R. O’Sullivan and D. O’Brien (2013) Scaling Agile Methods to Regulated Environments: An Industry Case Study, Proceedings of the 35th International Conference on Software Engineering (Software Engineering in Practice track), pp. 863–872
