= Britt Wray =

Researcher and author

- Born: 1986 (age 39–40); Canada
- Education: University of Copenhagen (PhD)
- Occupations: Author, researcher, science communicator
- Employer: Stanford University
- Known for: Work on climate change and mental health; Director of CIRCLE at Stanford University
- Notable work: Generation Dread; Rise of the Necrofauna

Britt Wray (born 1986) is a Canadian author, researcher and science communicator known for her work at the intersection of climate change and mental health. She is an Instructor in the Department of Psychiatry and Behavioral Sciences at the Stanford School of Medicine and the founding Director of CIRCLE (Community-Minded Interventions for Resilience, Climate Leadership and Emotional Wellbeing), a research and action initiative focused on climate change and mental health at Stanford. Wray's research examines climate distress, eco-anxiety, community resilience, and the development of evidence-based interventions to address the psychological impacts of climate change.

== Early life and education ==
Wray was born in Canada to Joseph and Toni Wray and holds dual nationality in Canada and Ireland. She received her PhD in science communication from the University of Copenhagen, followed by postdoctoral research in Human and Planetary health at Stanford University and the London School of Hygiene and Tropical Medicine. She also earned a certificate in Climate psychology from the California Institute of Integral Studies and completed fellowships in climate health organizing and health equity through Harvard C-Change and the Cambridge Health Alliance.

== Career ==
=== Academic and research work ===
At Stanford, Wray directs CIRCLE, leading projects on the mental health impacts of climate change, particularly among youth and historically underserved communities. She serves as Principal Investigator of Y-CARE (Youth Co-Designing Adaptations for Resilience and Empowerment), funded by the R.N. Ho Family Foundation, which develops youth-led peer support interventions for climate distress across the United States, Canada, and Australia. Wray's work on the psychological effects of climate change has been profiled by The New York Times, which cited her as a Stanford University researcher and author of Generation Dread, describing climate change as a major emerging threat to mental health.

Wray is also co-Principal Investigator of a Canadian Institutes of Health Research (CIHR) project titled Youth Taking Action on Climate Change: Developing a Pathway to Care in Integrated Youth Services. She has contributed to multinational initiatives such as the Wellcome Trust’s Connecting Climate Minds project and collaborated on international surveys assessing climate anxiety in youth, published in multiple peer-reviewed journals.

CIRCLE additionally focuses on educating mental health professionals and trainees in climate-aware approaches to clinical and community care.

=== Publications and authorship ===
Wray is the author of two books. Her first, Rise of the Necrofauna: The Science, Ethics, and Risks of De-Extinction (Greystone Books, 2017), examines the scientific and ethical implications of efforts to recreate extinct species such as the woolly mammoth and passenger pigeon. The book was published in collaboration with the David Suzuki Foundation, was a finalist for the Lane Anderson Award for science writing and was listed by The New Yorker among its “Books We Loved” of 2017.

Her second book, Generation Dread: Finding Purpose in an Age of Climate Crisis (Knopf, 2022), explores the psychological and social dimensions of climate anxiety and grief. It became a national bestseller in Canada and was a finalist for the 2022 Governor General’s Award.

She also writes the Substack newsletter Unthinkable (formerly Gen Dread), which focuses on resilience and mental health in the context of the climate crisis. Wray founded the nonprofit Unthinkable, an organization addressing the psychological dimensions of climate change and environmental degradation.

Her work has been featured in media outlets such as The New York Times, The Guardian, TIME, The Washington Post, NPR, Oprah Daily, and the World Economic Forum.

=== Media and public engagement ===
Wray has hosted and produced radio and television programs with the CBC, BBC, and NPR, and is a frequent public speaker. She has been making radio since she was 19 years old. Along with Ellie Cosgrave, she co-hosted the BBC podcast Tomorrow's World, which examined how science and technology may influence the future. She has guest hosted The Nature of Things and Quirks and Quarks, two of Canada's national science programs on CBC. She has spoken at major international events including TED and the World Economic Forum, where she advocates for integrating mental health, social resilience, and community engagement into climate action frameworks.

== Honors and awards ==
Wray has received several awards for her research and science communication, including:

- American Climate Leadership Award – Runner-up (2025).
- Canadian Eco-Hero Award (2023)
- SciComm Excellence Award – Top Prize, Early Career Researcher Category, from the U.S. National Academies of Sciences, Engineering, and Medicine and Schmidt Futures (2023).

== Selected publications ==
- Wray, Britt (2022-05-03). Generation Dread. Knopf Canada. ISBN 978-0-7352-8072-4.
- Wray, Britt; Church, George McDonald (2017). Rise of the Necrofauna. Vancouver, BC: Greystone Books. ISBN 978-1-77164-164-7.
