= Farrell–Markushevich theorem =

Mathematical theorem

In mathematics, the Farrell–Markushevich theorem, proved independently by O. J. Farrell (1899–1981) and A. I. Markushevich (1908–1979) in 1934, is a result concerning the approximation in mean square of holomorphic functions on a bounded open set in the complex plane by complex polynomials. It states that complex polynomials form a dense subspace of the Bergman space of a domain bounded by a simple closed Jordan curve. The Gram–Schmidt process can be used to construct an orthonormal basis in the Bergman space and hence an explicit form of the Bergman kernel, which in turn yields an explicit Riemann mapping function for the domain.

== Proof ==
Let Ω be the bounded Jordan domain and let Ω_{n} be bounded Jordan domains decreasing to Ω, with Ω_{n} containing the closure of Ω_{n + 1}. By the Riemann mapping theorem there is a conformal mapping f_{n} of Ω_{n} onto Ω, normalised to fix a given point in Ω with positive derivative there. By the Carathéodory kernel theorem f_{n}(z) converges uniformly on compacta in Ω to z. In fact Carathéodory's theorem implies that the inverse maps tend uniformly on compacta to z. Given a subsequence of f_{n}, it has a subsequence, convergent on compacta in Ω. Since the inverse functions converge to z, it follows that the subsequence converges to z on compacta. Hence f_{n} converges to z on compacta in Ω.

As a consequence the derivative of f_{n} tends to 1 uniformly on compacta.

Let g be a square integrable holomorphic function on Ω, i.e. an element of the Bergman space A^{2}(Ω). Define g_{n} on Ω_{n} by g_{n}(z) = g(f_{n}(z))f_{n}'(z). By change of variable

$$\displaystyle{\|g_n\|^2_{\Omega_n} =\|g\|_\Omega^2.}$$

Let h_{n} be the restriction of g_{n} to Ω. Then the norm of h_{n} is less than that of g_{n}. Thus these norms are uniformly bounded. Passing to a subsequence if necessary, it can therefore be assumed that h_{n} has a weak limit in A^{2}(Ω). On the other hand, h_{n} tends uniformly on compacta to g. Since the evaluation maps are continuous linear functions on A^{2}(Ω), g is the weak limit of h_{n}. On the other hand, by Runge's theorem, h_{n} lies in the closed subspace K of A^{2}(Ω) generated by complex polynomials. Hence g lies in the weak closure of K, which is K itself.

== See also ==
- Mergelyan's theorem
