= Specialized Educational Scientific Center =

Coordinates: 54.8453°N 83.0949°E

The Specialized Educational Scientific Center (SESC NSU), officially M. A. Lavrentyev Specialized Educational Scientific Center of the Novosibirsk State University, is an educational institution in Akademgorodok, Novosibirsk, Russia. It provides the final stage of secondary education and is affiliated with Novosibirsk State University.

The idea of Specialized Educational Scientific Center was invented in 1962 at the same time with the first Summer School of Mathematics and Physics. SESC was established in 1963 as the High School of Physics and Mathematics № 165. In 1989 it was renamed to SESC (specialized teaching and research center).

Nowadays there are about 500 students in SESC. They are taught by more than 260 teachers, including 21 professors, 21 doctors, 81 PhD and 72 associate professors. More than half of teachers are scientists of the Siberian Branch of the Russian Academy of Sciences and professors of Novosibirsk State University. The SESC NSU occupies four buildings: a study building for 540 persons, two dormitories for 540 persons, a dining hall for 140 persons. The buildings are under the jurisdiction of the Siberian Branch of the Russian Academy of Sciences.
