= Aleksei Markushevich =

Russian mathematician (1908–1979)

- Алексей Маркушевич
- Born: April 2, 1908; Petrozavodsk, Russian Empire
- Died: June 7, 1979 (aged 71); Moscow, Soviet Union
- Education: First Central Asian State Universit
- Known for: Farrell–Markushevich theorem
- Awards: Order of Lenin; Order of the Red Banner of Labour
- Scientific career
- Fields: Mathematics
- Workplaces: Moscow State University
- Doctoral advisor: Mikhail Lavrentyev

Aleksei Ivanovich Markushevich (Russian: Алексей Иванович Маркушевич; 2 April [O.S. 20 March] 1908, Petrozavodsk – 7 June 1979, Moscow) was a Soviet mathematician, mathematical educator, and historian of mathematics. He is known for the Farrell–Markushevich theorem.

== Biography ==
Markushevich's father worked as a junior architect for the Olonets provincial government. In 1916 the family moved to Semipalatinsk, where he graduated from secondary school in 1924. In 1925 he matriculated at the First Central Asian State University (now the National University of Uzbekistan). There in 1930 he graduated and was admitted to the correspondence course (education by mail) of the graduate school. In autumn 1931 he became a graduate student in the Research Institute of Mechanics and Mathematics, Moscow State University. There he received in 1934 his Aspirantur (similar to a PhD) under the supervision of Mikhail Lavrentyev, became at the beginning of 1935 a senior researcher, and became in 1938 an associate professor. At Moscow State University, Markushevich received in 1944 his Russian Doctor of Sciences degree (habilitation) and in 1946 became a full professor, retaining that academic position until his death.

Markushevich was elected in 1945 a corresponding member and in 1950 a full member of Академии педагогических наук РСФСР (Academy of Pedagogical Sciences, Russian Soviet Federative Socialist Republic). For that academy he served as vice-president from 1950 to 1958 and again from 1964 to 1967. From 1958 to 1964 he was the primary deputy minister of education of the Russian Soviet Federative Socialist Republic.

In Академии педагогических наук СССР (Academy of Pedagogical Sciences of the USSR), he was elected a full member in 1967 and served as its vice-president from 1967 to 1975.

In 1978 he was an Invited Speaker at the International Congress of Mathematicians (ICM) in Helsinki.

The last years of his life were overshadowed by a scandal related to the theft of medieval European manuscripts from Российский государственный архив древних актов, РГАДА / RGADA (Russian State Archives of Ancient Documents; investigations revealed that the main buyer of the stolen documents was Markushevich.

He was buried in Moscow at the Kuntsevo Cemetery (section 10).

== Mathematical research ==
Markushevich's mathematical research deals mainly with complex analysis, conformal mapping, and approximation theory. He published a series of papers on approximation, interpolation, and completeness; the papers contributed to the pioneering methods of functional analysis, in particular the theory of linear spaces, which began to be widely used in the theory of analytic functions.

== Book publishing activities ==
He was head of the editorial office of mathematics of the Soviet Издательство технико-теоретической литературы (Publishing House of Technical and Theoretical Literature) from 1934 to 1937 and again from 1943 to 1947.

He initiated and participated in the publication of the series of books Популярные лекции по математике (Popular Lectures on Mathematics) published in 62 volumes from 1950 to 1992 and the series of books Библиотека учителя (Teacher's Library).

From 1951 to 1952 and from 1963 to 1966, he was among the initiators and editors of Энциклопедия элементарной математики (Encyclopedia of Elementary Mathematics).

Markushevich was keenly interested in the history of books. Beginning in the 1940s he collected old books of historical interest. In 1976, he donated his collection of incunables to the State Library of the USSR named after V.I. Lenin.

== Educational reform ==
During the 1960s and 1970s Markushevich was a leading supporter of reforming the teaching of mathematics in Soviet schools. In the 1960s, he took part in the creation of new school textbooks on mathematics, developed the pedagogical theory of school textbooks, and worked on improving the training of school mathematics teachers. He was the chair of the joint commission of the Academy of Sciences of the Soviet Union and the Academy of Pedagogical Sciences of the USSR, which determined the content of education in secondary schools.

== Selected publications ==
=== Articles ===
- Die Arbeiten von C. F. Gauß über Funktionentheorie. (The works of C. F. Gauss on complex analysis) In: Hans Reichardt (ed.): C. F. Gauss. Gedenkband anlässlich des 100. Todestages am 23. Februar 1955. Teubner, Leipzig 1957, pp. 151–182.
- A. N. Kolmogorov, A. P. Yushkevich (eds.), B. L. Laptev, B. A. Rosenfel'd, A. I. Markushevich: Mathematics of the 19th Century. Geometry, analytic function theory. Birkhäuser, Basel 1996. Markushevich contributed the section Analytic Function Theory.

=== Books ===
- Theory of Analytic Functions. Hindustan Publishing Co., Delhi, 1963. (translation of 1961 Russian edition, revised from the 1944 Russian edition)
- Skizzen zur Geschichte der analytischen Funktionen (Sketches on the history of analytic functions) (= Hochschulbücher für Mathematik. vol. 16). Deutscher Verlag der Wissenschaften, Berlin 1955.
- Theory of functions of a complex variable. 3 vols. Prentice-Hall, 1965–1967
  - Silverman, Richard A. (May 1984). Introductory Complex Analysis. Courier Corporation. ISBN 9780486646862. (1 volume abridgment of the 3 volumes translated by Richard A. Silverman)
- Entire Functions. American Elsevier, 1966, 105 pages (translated from the 1965 Russian edition); Markushevich, A. I. (12 May 2014). Entire Functions. Elsevier. ISBN 9781483274904. (ebook)
- The Remarkable Sine Functions. American Elsevier, 1966 (translated from 1965 Russian edition); Markushevich, A. I. (12 May 2014). The Remarkable Sine Functions. Elsevier. ISBN 9781483275215. (ebook)
- Markushevich, A. I. (1992). Introduction to the Classical Theory of Abelian Functions. American Mathematical Soc. ISBN 9780821841648. (ebook translated from the 1979 Russian edition by G. Bluher)
