= Mikhail Lavrentyev =

Soviet mathematician and hydrodynamicist

- Михаил Лаврентьев
- Born: Mikhail Alekseyevich Lavrentyev; November 19, 1900; Kazan, Russian Empire
- Died: October 15, 1980 (aged 79); Moscow, Soviet Union
- Education: Moscow State University
- Awards: Lomonosov Gold Medal (1977)
- Scientific career
- Fields: Mathematics
- Workplaces: Moscow State University; Steklov Institute of Mathematics
- Doctoral advisor: Nikolai Luzin
- Doctoral students: Mstislav Keldysh; Aleksei Markushevich

Mikhail Alekseyevich Lavrentyev (or Lavrentiev, Russian: Михаи́л Алексе́евич Лавре́нтьев; November 19, 1900 – October 15, 1980) was a Soviet mathematician and hydrodynamicist.

== Early years ==
Lavrentyev was born in Kazan, where his father was an instructor at a college (he later became a professor at Kazan University, then Moscow University).

He entered Kazan University, and, when his family moved to Moscow in 1921, he transferred to the Department of Physics and Mathematics of Moscow University. He graduated in 1922. He continued his studies in the university in 1923-26 as a graduate student of Nikolai Luzin.

Although Luzin was alleged to plagiarize in science and indulge in anti-Sovietism by some of his students in 1936, Lavrentyev did not participate in the notorious political persecution of his teacher which is known as the Luzin case or Luzin affair. In fact Luzin was a friend of his father.

== Mid career ==
In 1927, Lavrentyev spent half a year in France, collaborating with French mathematicians, and upon returned took up a position with Moscow University. Later he became a member of the staff of the Steklov Institute. His main contributions relate to conformal mappings and partial differential equations. Mstislav Keldysh was one of his students.

In 1939, Oleksandr Bogomolets, the president of the Ukrainian Academy of Sciences, asked Lavrentyev to become director of the Institute of Mathematics at Kyiv.

One of Lavrentyev's scientific interests was the physics of explosive processes, in which he had become involved when doing defense work during World War II. A better understanding of the physics of explosions made it possible to use controlled explosions in construction, the best-known example being the construction of the Medeu Mudflow Control Dam outside of Almaty in Kazakhstan.

== In Siberia ==
Mikhail Lavrentyev was one of the main organizers and the first Chairman of the Siberian Division of the Russian Academy of Sciences (in his time the Academy of Sciences of the USSR) from its founding in 1957 to 1975. The foundation of the Siberia's "Academic Town" Akademgorodok (now a district of Novosibirsk) remains his most widely known achievement.

Six months after the decision to found the Siberian Division of the USSR Academy of Sciences Novosibirsk State University was established. The Decree of the Council of Ministers of the USSR was signed January 9, 1958. From 1959 to 1966 he was a professor at Novosibirsk State University.

Lavrentyev was also a founder of the Institute of Hydrodynamics of the Siberian Division of the Russian Academy of Sciences which since 1980 has been named after Lavrentyev.

Lavrentyev was awarded the honorary title of Hero of Socialist Labour, a Lenin and 2 Stalin Prizes, and a Lomonosov Gold Medal. He was elected a member of several world-renowned academies, and an honorable citizen of Novosibirsk.

Mikhail A. Lavrentyev's son, also named Mikhail (Mikhail M. Lavrentyev, 1930-2010), also became a mathematician and was a member of the leadership of Akademgorodok.

== Eponyms ==
- Street in Kazan
- Street in Dolgoprudny
- Academician Lavrentyev Avenue in Novosibirsk
- Lavrentyev Institute of Hydrodynamics in Novosibirsk
- SESC affiliated with NSU
- Novosibirsk Lavrentyev Lyceum 130
- RV Akademik Lavrentyev
- Aiguilles in Altai and Pamir
