= European Master on Software Engineering =

European master of science program

The European Master on Software Engineering, or European Masters Programme in Software Engineering (new name since 2015) (EMSE) is a two-year joint Master of Science (Msc) program coordinated by four European universities (Free University of Bozen-Bolzano, Technical University of Madrid, Kaiserslautern University of Technology, University of Oulu), funded by the Erasmus+ Programme of the European Union.

== Programme Overview ==
The discipline software engineering is traditionally designed to bridge industry and research needs. The European Masters Programme in Software Engineering (EMSE) is a part of the Erasmus Mundus Programme from the European Commission which focuses on the area of software engineering. This course enforces a wide spectrum of courses based on the high scientific knowledge of each partner university both in theoretical and applied research. With this program students will be guided into a cognitive path including foundation courses - such as advanced statistics, requirements engineering, verification and validation, software quality and management - and elective courses in which basic knowledge is applied, such as distributed systems, information management, computer networks, cluster technologies, software product lines, system engineering, system security, internet technologies, usability and others.

The courses are project oriented. This means that students have a large offering of internships and projects to develop at the university or in a company. Courses are taught in English. Nevertheless, students can take advantage of the university language centre to learn local languages at zero costs.

With EMSE, students will become familiar with the software engineering discipline both through theoretical and practical experience. This program aims at forming high qualified professionals in software engineering with a strong theoretical base and practical competence that can be spent both in industry and for a further education plan. Namely, motivated students are prepared for a future PhD, taking also advantage of the excellent connections of the EMSE consortium with international research centres and European consortia.

== Partner universities ==
- Free University of Bozen-Bolzano, Italy (coordinating university)
- Universidad Politécnica de Madrid, Spain
- Technische Universität Kaiserslautern, Germany
- University of Oulu, Finland
