= Novosibirsk Lavrentyev Lyceum 130 =

Municipal budgetary establishment of general education city of Novosibirsk "Lyceum № 130 named after Academician M. A. Lavrentyev"
- МБОУ Лицей № 130 имени академика М. А. Лаврентьева
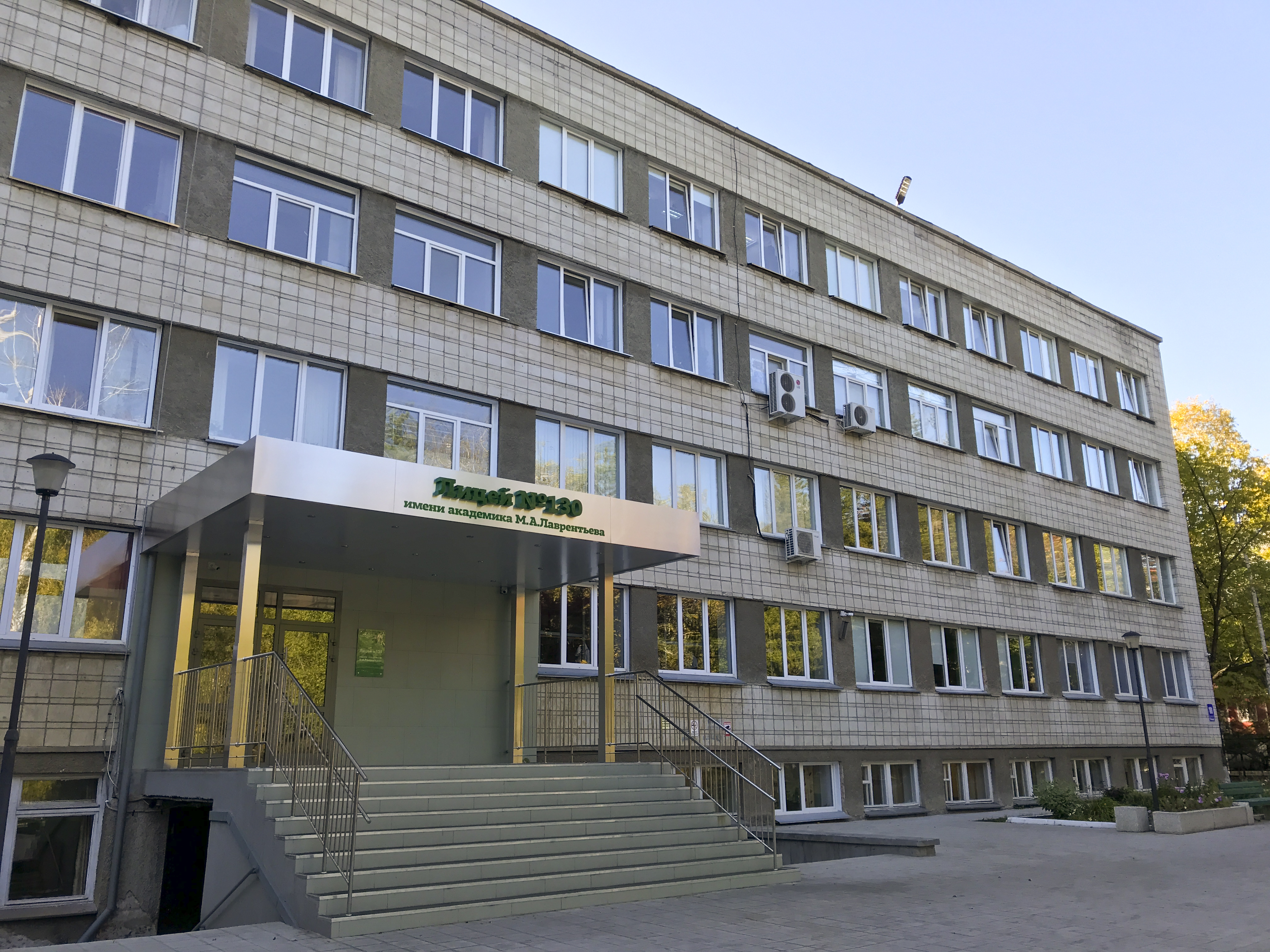

Location
- 10, Uchjonyh st. Novosibirsk; Russia
- Coordinates: 54.8213°N 83.1619°E

Information
- Type: Lyceum
- Established: August 5, 1959
- Founder: Mikhail Lavrentyev
- Rector: Serguey Sopochkin
- Grades: 1–11
- Website: licey130.ru

Novosibirsk Lavrentyev Lyceum 130 is a secondary school in Akademgorodok, Novosibirsk.

== Location ==
- In 1959 school was situated in wooden building, in "Shya" district (Northern Akademgorodok).
- In 1960 school was moved to 10, Detskij proezd. It was the first school building in Southern Akademgorodok.
- In 1961 another school building in Akademgorodok was built.
- In 1962 the main building of NSU was completed and the school returned to 10, Detskij Proezd.
- Since 1970 school is situated in 10, Uchjonyh st.

== History ==
In 1959 school No. 126 was founded in Novosibirsk Akademgorodok. During the first week of the first term school's number was changed to 130 and this number is current nowadays.

In 1962 — 1963, there were some subjects in English, but this way of teaching turned out to be impracticable. It was quite hard for pupils to learn new information and new English vocabulary. By the end of the academic year british literature was the only English-thought subject. In the same year first pupils graduated the school. There were two graduate classes with 17 tenth-grade pupils in each one.In 1967 ICT lessons started. Pupils had lessons in Institute of Computational Mathematics, but in 1975 school got its own computer class. In 1968 the first specialized classes in USSR (math-classes, natural-sciences-classes and humanitarian-sciences-classes) appeared in this school.

In 1997 the first school internet-class in Novosibirsk was opened here by George Soros.

In 2001 school got Mikhail Lavrentyev's name, and in 2002 it got the status of lyceum.

== Directors' list ==
| No. | Name | In office |
|---|---|---|
| 1 | Nikolai Polivanov | July 29, 1959 — March 1962 |
| 2 | Juri Greckov | March 1962 — April 26, 1967 |
| | Tamara Pozdeeva | April 26, 1967 — August 25, 1968 |
| 3 | Peter Grenovski | August 25, 1968 — December 1970 |
| 4 | Nikolai Tarhov | December 1970 — August 1986 |
| 5 | Aleksandr Bannov | August 1986 — September 19, 2000 |
| 6 | Tatjana Delfonceva | September 19, 2000 — October 6, 2005 |
| 7 | Sergei Sopochkin | October 6, 2005 — Present time |

== Photos ==
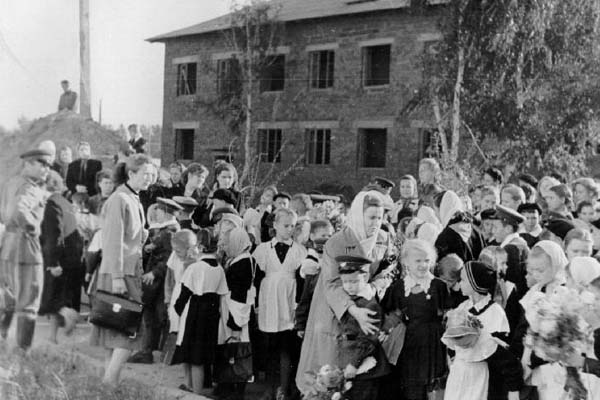
First Knowledge Day (1959)

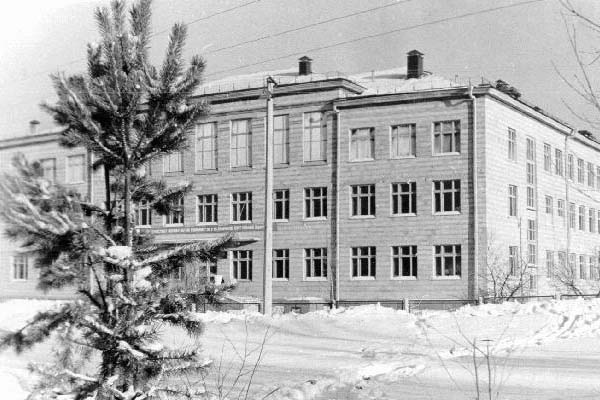
10, Detskij proezd (1960s)

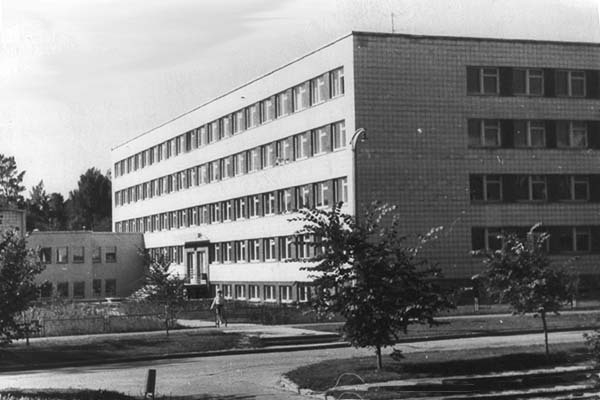
10, Uchjonyh st. (1970)

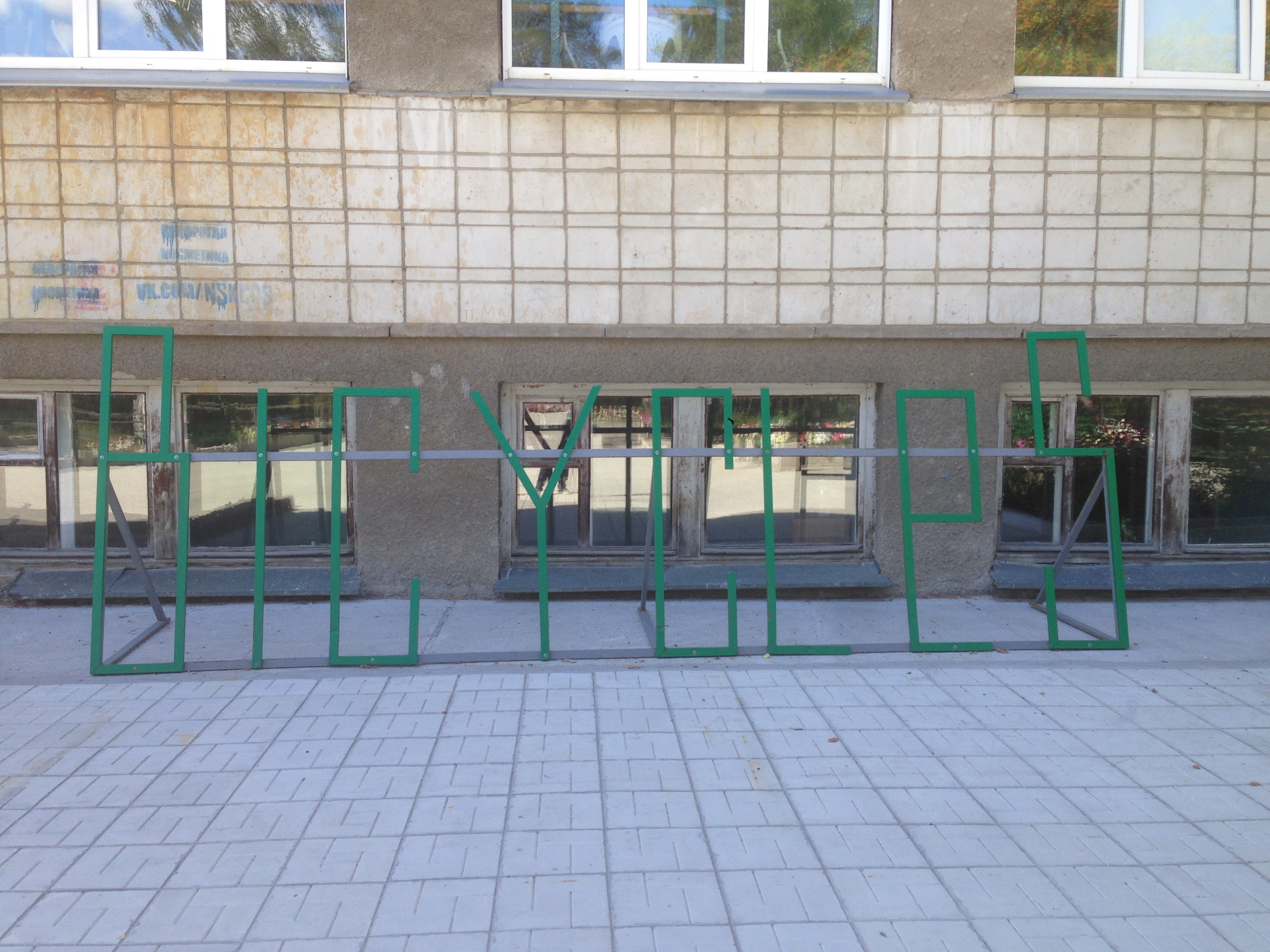
Bike-stand

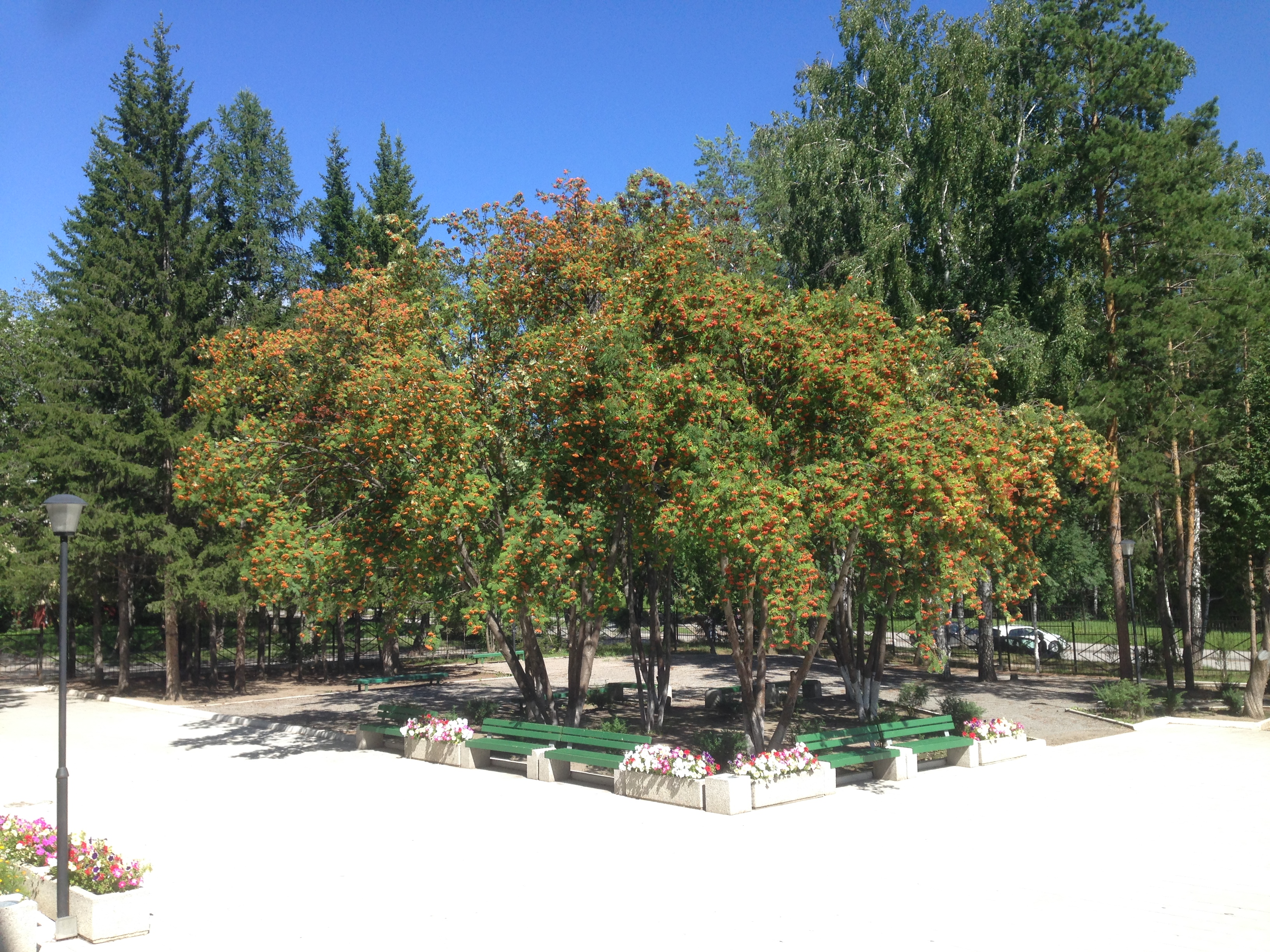
School-yard

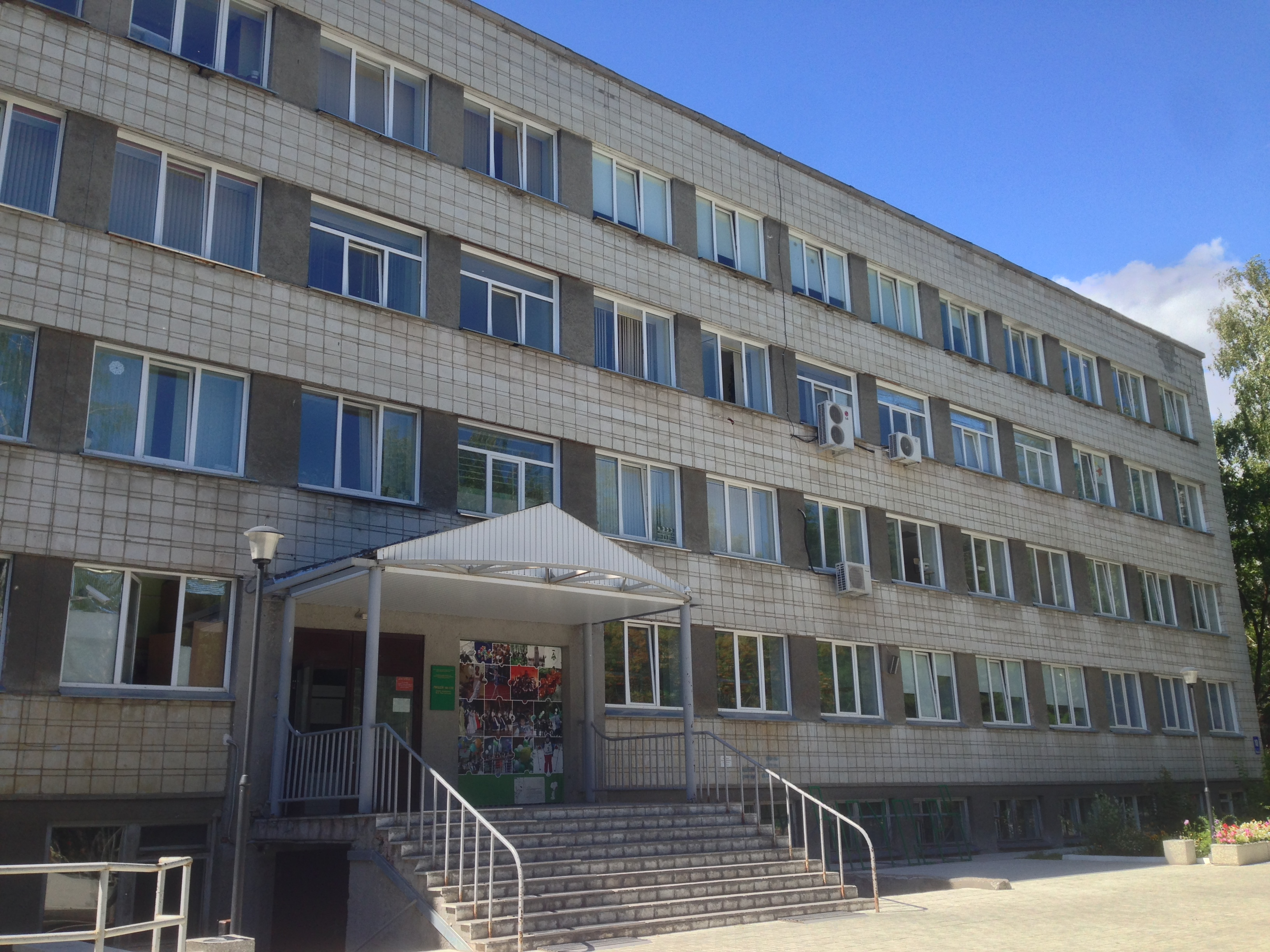
In August 2015
