= Lavrentyev Institute of Hydrodynamics =

Research institute based in Akademgorodok of Novosibirsk, Russia

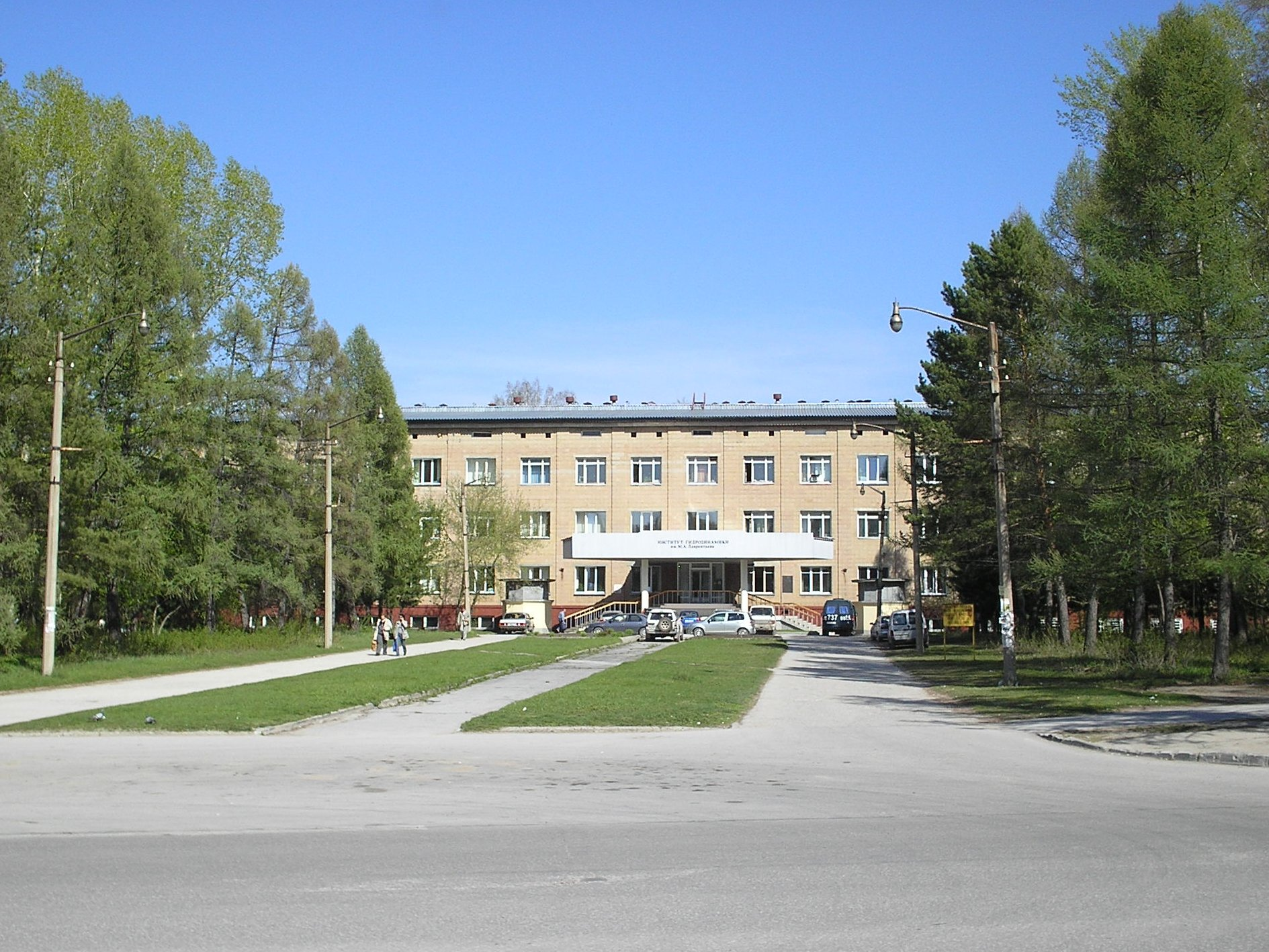
- Established: 1957
- Director: Evgenii Ermaniuk
- Owner: Siberian Branch of the Russian Academy of Sciences
- Address: Lavrentyev Prospekt, 15, Novosibirsk, 630090, Russia
- Location: Novosibirsk, Russia
- Website: hydro.nsc.ru

Lavrentyev Institute of Hydrodynamics of the Siberian Branch of the Russian Academy of Sciences (Russian: Институт гидродинамики имени М. А. Лаврентьева СО РАН) is the first research institute based in Akademgorodok of Novosibirsk, Russia. It was founded in 1957.

== History ==
The scientific organization was established in 1957 and became one of the first institutes of the Siberian Branch of the RAS. In 1980, the institute was named after Mikhail Lavrentyev.

From 1991 to 2001, the organization was part of the Joint Institute of Hydrodynamics. In early 2002, 417 people worked at the institute including 2 academicians, 4 corresponding members, 52 doctors of sciences and 72 candidates of sciences.

== Activities ==
The institute works in various areas, such as mathematical problems of continuum mechanics, physics and mechanics of high-energy processes, mechanics of liquids and gases, mechanics of a deformable solid. During the Soviet period, the organization began to engage in explosion welding.

Among the significant results of the institute is the construction of the complete theory of detonation in gases, which explained, among other things, the nature of spin detonation; the discovery and investigation of new phenomena in the field of explosive processes and detonation, including the formation of ultradispersed diamond during an explosion; a rigorous substantiation of approximate models of the theory of wave motions of a perfect fluid; the development of methods for group analysis of differential equations, which formed the basis for the Podmodeli programm, designed to study the properties of exact solutions to the equations of continuum mechanics; the development of methods to suppress instability in combustion chambers; the creation of cutting equipment for nuclear reprocessing etc.

== Educational activities ==
The institute conducts pedagogical activities at Novosibirsk State University and other educational institutions.

== Departments ==
- Theoretical Department
- Department of Explosive Processes
- Department of Physical Hydrodynamics
- Department of Deformable Solids
- Department of Fast Processes
- Department of Applied Hydrodynamics

== Branches ==
- Design and Technologigal Branch of the Lavrentyev Institute of Hydrodynamics is the former Special Design Bureau of Hydraulic Impulse Technique, established in 1964. In 1991–2001, together with the institute, it was part of the Joint Institute of Hydrodynamics. Since 2004, the bureau has become a branch of the organization.

== Scientific editions ==
- Applied Mechanics and Technical Physics (since 1960)
- Combustion, Explosion, and Shock Waves (since 1965)
- Dinamika Sploshnoi Sredy (since 1969)

== Leaders ==
- Mikhail Lavrentyev (1957–1976)
- Lev Ovsyannikov (1976–1986)
- Vladimir Titov (1986–2004)
- Vladimir Teshukov (2004–2008)
- Anatoly Vasilyev (2008–2015)
- Sergei Golovin (2015-2019)
- Evgenii Ermaniuk (since 2019)
