= Eco-municipality =

"Eco-municipality" has a specific meaning. For a more general discussion of the sustainability of cities, see Sustainable city.

An eco-municipality or eco-town is a local government area that has adopted ecological and social justice values in its charter. The development of eco-municipalities stems from changing systems in Sweden, where more than seventy municipal governments have accepted varying principles of sustainability in their operations as well as community-wide decision-making processes. The purpose of these policies is to increase the overall sustainability of the community.

Large scale social movements can influence both community choices and the built environment. Eco-municipalities may be one such movement. Eco-municipalities take a systems approach, based on sustainability principles. The eco-municipality movement is participatory, involving community members in a bottom-up approach.

The distinction between an eco-municipality and other sustainable development projects (such as green building and alternative energy) is the focus on community involvement and social transformation in a public agency, as well as the use of a holistic systems approach. An eco-municipality is one that recognizes that issues of sustainability are key to all decisions made by government.

== History ==
In 1983 the Övertorneå community of Sweden first adopted an Eco-municipality framework, followed by a formal organization in 1995 (SEKOM).

== Framework ==
In becoming an eco-municipality, cities or towns typically adopt a resolution, based on the Natural Step framework (or Framework for Strategic Sustainable Development (FSSD)), which sets the following objectives:

- Reduce dependence upon fossil fuels.
- Reduce dependence upon synthetic chemicals.
- Reduce encroachment upon nature.
- Better meet human needs fairly and efficiently.

== Municipalities adopting framework ==
Communities in North America, Europe and Africa ranging in size from villages of 300 to cities of 700,000 have become eco-municipalities. In Sweden, over one hundred municipalities have officially become eco-municipalities. They have formed a national association of eco-municipalities to assist one another and work to influence national policy. Whistler, BC, was awarded first place in a United Nations-endorsed international competition for sustainable communities. Its long-term sustainability plan, Whistler 2020, is based on the Natural Step framework.

In Wisconsin, there is a growing eco-municipality movement which began in the Chequamegon Bay region. As of November 2007, twelve local communities had formally adopted eco-municipality resolutions. The resolutions state the community's intention to become an eco-municipality, endorsing the Natural Step sustainability principles and framework as a guide.

In Sweden, more than 70 cities and towns—25 percent of all municipalities in the country—have adopted a common set of "Sustainability Principles" and implemented these systematically throughout their municipal operations. There are now twelve eco-municipalities in the United States and the American Planning Association has adopted sustainability objectives based on the same principles.

== See also ==
- Ecovillage
- Eco-towns
- Green municipalism
- Sustainable city
