= Centre for Innovation, Research and Competence in the Learning Economy =

Swedish research centre

Coordinates: 55°42′39″N 13°12′18″E

CIRCLE, Lund University
- Type: Research institute
- Established: July 1st 2004
- Founder: Charles Edquist
- Administrative staff: 37 (Dec. 2009)
- Location: Lund, Scania, Sweden
- Website: http://www.circle.lu.se/

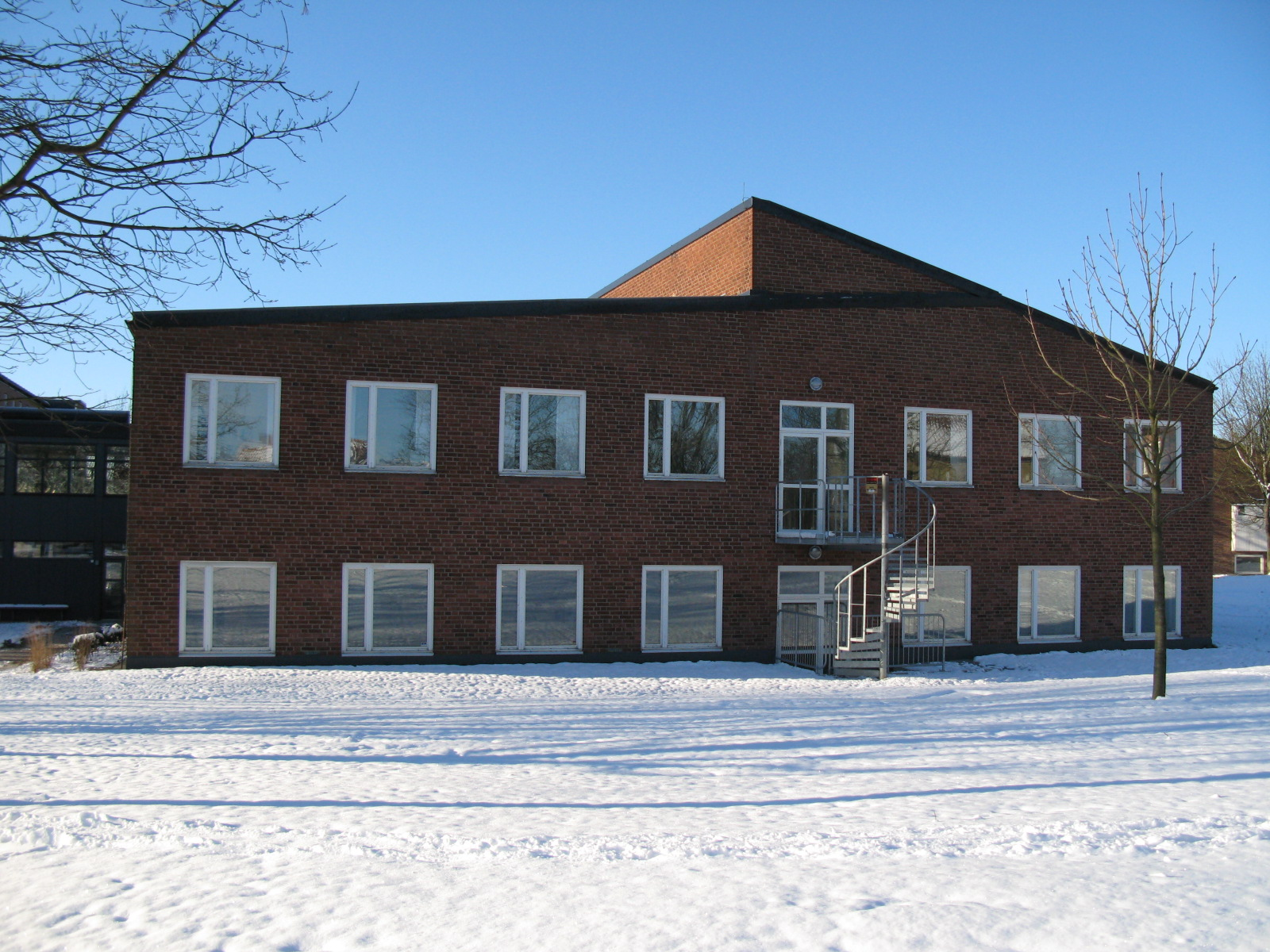
CIRCLE building at Sölvegatan in Lund in winter

The Centre for Innovation Research (CIRCLE) is an interdisciplinary research centre situated in Lund, Sweden. It spans over three faculties at Lund University.

== History ==
CIRCLE was initiated in July 2004 with long-term funding by VINNOVA (Swedish Governmental Agency for Innovation Systems), Lund University and Blekinge Institute of Technology. It is one of the four national research Centres of Excellence funded by VINNOVA. Known for established connections with renowned research environments in the fields of innovation, entrepreneurship and economic growth, guest researchers and visiting scholars are invited to for international research and teaching milieu through presentations and seminars.

== Research ==
CIRCLE’s research is organized into the four main research areas addressing different aspects of innovation and knowledge creation. They are:

- learning in innovation systems and the consequences of R&D and innovation for productivity growth
- international comparison of regional innovation systems
- the entrepreneurial university and the creation of research-based firms
- public policy in the field of innovation, R&D and competence building in a comparative perspective.

The research focus lies on the socioeconomic and policy aspects of three kinds of learning:

- Innovation (in new products as well as processes) which takes place mainly in firms.
- Research and Development (R&D) which is carried out in universities and research organizations as well as in firms.
- Competence Building (e.g., training and education), which is done in schools and universities (schooling, education) as well as in firms (in the form of training, learning-by-doing, learning-by-using and individual learning, often throughout life). Competence building is the same as enhancement of human capital.
