= Grigory Tirsky =

Grigory Alexandrovich Tirsky
- Григорий Александрович Тирский
- Born: September 1, 1929; Tira village, Irkutsk Oblast, USSR
- Died: October 10, 2022 (aged 93); Dolgoprudny, Moscow Oblast, Russia
- Education: Tomsk State University, Moscow State University
- Known for: Theory of thermochemical destruction of thermal protection coatings; meteoroid ablation modeling
- Awards: S. A. Chaplygin Gold Medal of the Russian Academy of Sciences (1995), Lomonosov Prize (1985), Prize of the Government of the Russian Federation (2007)
- Scientific career
- Fields: Fluid dynamics, hypersonic aerodynamics, physico-chemical gas dynamics, kinetic theory of gases
- Workplaces: Moscow Institute of Physics and Technology, Research Institute of Mechanics, Moscow State University, Central Institute of Aviation Motors
- Doctoral advisor: L. I. Sedov

Grigory Alexandrovich Tirsky (Russian: Григорий Александрович Тирский; 1 September 1929 – 10 October 2022) was a Soviet and Russian scientist in the field of mechanics and a university educator.

== Biography ==
Tirsky was born on 1 September 1929 in the village of Tira, Kirensky District, Irkutsk Oblast, into a peasant family. In 1931 the family moved to Yakutsk, where he received his secondary education.

He graduated from the mechanics and mathematics faculty of Tomsk State University in 1952. From 1952 to 1956 he studied at the postgraduate school of the mechanics and mathematics faculty of Moscow State University, where his scientific advisor was academician L. I. Sedov. In 1955 he defended his candidate dissertation ("Exact solutions of some problems of free and forced thermal convection"), and in 1963 he received the degree of Doctor of Physical and Mathematical Sciences for the dissertation "Destruction of solids in a hypersonic gas flow".

Tirsky began working at the Central Institute of Aviation Motors (CIAM). From 1957 he taught at the Moscow Institute of Physics and Technology (MIPT), where he was a professor at the department of computational mathematics. From 1961 he worked at the Institute of Mechanics of Moscow State University, and in 1964 he became head of the Laboratory of Physico-Chemical Gas Dynamics, which he led until 2013.

He was a full member of the Russian Academy of Natural Sciences, the International Academy of Astronautics, a member of the European Mechanics Society (EUROMECH) since 1999, a Soros Professor, and an honorary doctor of the Research Institute of Applied Mathematics and Mechanics at Tomsk State University.

Tirsky died on 10 October 2022 in Dolgoprudny, Moscow Oblast, at the age of 93.

== Research ==
Tirsky obtained fundamental results in hypersonic aerodynamics and heat transfer, physico-chemical gas dynamics, boundary layer theory, ballistics of meteoric bodies, and the kinetic theory of gases.

In the early 1960s he laid the foundations of a new scientific direction — the theory of thermochemical destruction of thermal protection coatings of aircraft and bolides. He developed multiscale models of thermochemical mass removal of real thermal protection coatings during orbital and superorbital entry of spacecraft into the atmospheres of Earth and other planets.

Together with his students he developed an original efficient marching-iterative method for solving the equations of viscous shock layers and parabolized Navier–Stokes equations for supersonic and hypersonic flows over blunt bodies with real physico-chemical processes taken into account, as well as continuum methods for calculating heat fluxes and friction on the frontal surfaces of hypersonic vehicles in transitional (from free-molecular to continuum) flow regimes.

In his later years, his main research focus was the study of the motion, ablation, luminosity and destruction in the atmosphere of natural space objects — meteoroids — based on the solution of equations of the physical theory of meteors. His paper on this subject was recognized as the best publication of the journal PMM in 2017.

Tirsky was the author of about 370–400 scientific papers, three monographs published abroad — including Hypersonic Aerodynamics and Heat Transfer (Begell House, 2014) — three inventions and one scientific discovery. He wrote dozens of articles on the mechanics of liquids, gases and plasma for the Great Russian Encyclopedia.

He prepared more than 60 candidates of science, 21 of whom went on to earn doctoral degrees.

== Selected publications ==
- Основы динамики излучающего газа (with N. N. Pilugin). Moscow: MGU, 1979. — 147 p.
- Динамика ионизированного излучающего газа (with N. N. Pilugin). Moscow: MGU, 1989. — 309 p.
- Super and Hypersonic Aerodynamics and Heat Transfer. CRC Press, 1993. — 335 p.
- Hypersonic Aerodynamics and Heat Transfer. Begell House, New York, 2014. — 536 p.

== Awards and honors ==
- Gold Medal named after S. A. Chaplygin of the Russian Academy of Sciences (1995) — for the cycle of works "Thermochemically non-equilibrium hydrodynamics"
- Lomonosov Prize, second degree, of Moscow State University (1985) — for the cycle of works "Theoretical study of supersonic flow around bodies by a viscous non-equilibrium gas"
- First Prize of the Ministry of Higher and Secondary Specialized Education of the USSR (1986) — for the best scientific work in aerodynamics and heat transfer
- Silver (1983) and bronze (1985) medals of VDNKh; MAIK "Nauka" Prize for the best publication (1996); Kapitsa commemorative medal of RANS (1999); "Peter the Great" medal (2000)
- Medal of the Order "For Merit to the Fatherland", II degree (2003)
- Medals of the Russian Federation of Cosmonautics named after academician L. I. Sedov (2004)
- Prize of the Government of the Russian Federation in the field of science and technology (2007)
- Honored Scientist of the Russian Federation (1996)
