= The Natural Step =

Foundation

- Founded: 1989
- Founder: Karl-Henrik Robèrt
- Type: Non-governmental organization

The Natural Step is a non-profit, non-governmental organisation founded in Sweden in 1989 by scientist Karl-Henrik Robèrt. The Natural Step is also used when referring to the partially open source framework it developed. Following publication of the Brundtland Report in 1987, Robèrt developed The Natural Step framework, setting out the system conditions for the sustainability of human activities on Earth; Robèrt's four system conditions are derived from a scientific understanding of universal laws and the aspects of our socio-ecological system, including the laws of gravity, the laws of thermodynamics and a multitude of social studies.

The Natural Step has pioneered a "Backcasting from Principles" approach meant to advance society towards greater sustainability. Whole-systems thinking and backcasting from sustainability principles form the basis for numerous applications and tools to plan and (re-)design organisational strategy, organisational processes, product/service innovation and business models. Its biggest advantage is the concept of 'simplification without reduction' to prevent getting lost in the details with the complex topic of sustainability. For almost 30 years, the approach has been implemented, proven and refined in education, research, businesses, municipalities, regional and national governments, inter-governmental organisations (e.g. UN, EU) and a multitude of NGOs around the world.

Currently, The Natural Step has offices in 9 countries and numerous associates and ambassadors in more than 50 countries. Next to the Five Level Framework and the TNS Framework (or Framework for Strategic Sustainable Development), the TNS 'theory of change' shows an integrated cascaded approach to accelerate change towards a sustainable society by collaboration on individual, organisational and multi-stakeholder system level. Change programs and transition Labs include Future-Fit Business Benchmark and the Alberta, Canada energyfutureslab.

The Natural Step (TNS), an approach used to guide sustainability efforts in organizations, involves implicit and explicit precautions judgments that may limit growth. But these limits may be difficult for companies and individuals to adhere to. Some implicit precautions are that TNS avoids making judgments about specific levels of damage thresholds or critical concentrations because they are uncertain and can cause disagreements. TNS recommends actions to reduce dependence on certain materials and activities, but these recommendations assume that critical thresholds have already been breached. Some explicit precautions are TNS rate corollaries include avoiding the extraction, production, or dispersion of materials at a faster rate than their breakdown in nature and avoiding harvesting or manipulation of nature in a way that reduces productivity and diversity, and infrastructure development in human history would not have been possible had the TNS systems conditions and these first intended corollaries have been adhered to.

== Towards sustainability ==
Sustainability essentially means preserving life on Earth, including humanity - or the well-being of the socio-ecological system and it's subsystems over time. As also expressed in the 1987 Our common future report (a.k.a. the Brundtland report) meeting the needs of humans is central in sustainable development, however, it does not state which needs. Attempting to satisfy those human needs (whether 'real' or created) also are the root causes of many of societal (incl. ecological) challenges we face today. The Natural Step differs between fundamental human needs and their satisfiers (Manfred Max-Neef) and between real needs and created desires.

The Natural Step believes the root causes for unsustainability should be taken into account when designing for sustainable solutions and satisfaction of fundamental needs. These root causes are derived from a scientific understanding of our socio-ecological systems – the interactions between humans in society and between humans, their organisations and the ecosystem.

It was found that ecosystem functions and processes are systematically altered in the following ways (thereby degrading the ecosystem services and resources they provide):

- Society mines and disperses materials from the lithosphere into the biosphere faster than they are returned to the Earth's crust (examples include oil, coal, minerals such as Phosphors and metals such as mercury and lead).
- Society produces and concentrates substances faster than they can be broken down by natural processes — if they can be broken down at all (examples of such substances include plastics, dioxins, DDT and PCBs).
- Society encroaches on ecosystems faster than they can regenerate (for example, over-harvesting of natural resources including trees, fish, fresh water), or by other forms of ecosystem manipulation (for example, paving over fertile land or causing soil erosion).

Simultaneously, societal systems can be degraded by several factors (thereby eroding trust in the systems and trust in the individuals, organisations and institutes it consists of):

- Society allows structural obstacles to: health (of individuals in the system); influence (of how the system is organised), competence (development to understand context and to become the best one can be); impartiality (equal treatment) and meaning-making (a larger purpose).

== Framework ==
=== Overview ===
The 5 Level Framework (5LF) is a comprehensive model for planning and decision making in complex systems based on whole systems thinking. It comprises 5 levels: 1) System, 2) Success, 3) Strategic Guidelines, 4) Actions and 5) Tools. It can be used to analyze any complex system of any type or scale (e.g. human body, the game of chess or soccer, an organization, a sustainability concept) and helps to plan, decide and act strategically towards success based on principles determined by the working of the system (e.g. treat cancer, win chess or soccer, manage a successful business, design useful tools).

When the 5LF is applied to the socio-ecological system (or society within the biosphere) it is called the Natural Step Framework, or the Framework for Strategic Sustainable Development (FSSD). As a framework it helps to see the BIG picture of the workings and functions of our ecological and social systems and institutions, current trends and our sustainability challenge, how we as a society negatively influence the functioning of the socio-ecological system (System), what systems conditions should be met for it not to be negatively influenced (Success) and how to strategically plan towards that (Strategic Guidelines) with prioritised actions (Actions) selecting (or designing) and applying the appropriate tools for those (Tools).

Since its creation by Dr. Karl Henrik Robert in 1989, the framework has been reviewed by many scientists, is under constant development and has been an inspiration to other tools and concepts in the area of sustainable development. The framework has been tested in hundreds of organizations (businesses, governments, neighborhoods, NGO's) around the world. Based on experience with the framework specific guidelines, methods and applications have been developed and refined to accelerate and improve the application of the framework.

=== FSSD System Level ===
==== The Sustainability challenge ====
To explain the sustainability challenge, the metaphor of a funnel is used. The walls closing in represent the many (systematic and often exponentially increasing) trends impacting upon, and degrading, the system e.g.; decreasing number and quality of natural resources and ecosystems, the stricter laws and regulations, degrading interpersonal and person-to-person trust, increasing toxicity levels, growing human population, increase in demands for resources, etc. The walls of the funnel are getting closer and closer over time limiting the room to maneuver. Individuals, organisations and society are hitting the walls of the funnel over time e.g.: victims of climate change-related weather events, stricter laws and regulations, depleting fish stocks, increased number of cancer occurrences, air-, water-, soil pollution, erosion of trust, financial crises, bankruptcies due to price increases of scarce resources, land erosion, etc.

==== Overview of the science - Systems functions ====
Behind the framework there is a science-based understanding of the dynamic interrelationships within and between socio-ecological sub-systems and is based (a.o.) on study of ecosystems, laws of nature (including thermodynamics, conservation laws, laws of gravity, biogeochemical cycles, photosynthesis, systems thinking, flows of resources and wastes), social systems, social institutions (including trust and fundamental human needs), psychology.

In order to be able to create a structured overview and not to be confused with more downstream or detailed information only the logic of the concepts are explained here.

==== Ecological System ====
Earth's biosphere is an open system with regards to energy. Energy comes in the form of sunlight and energy leaves in the form of heat radiation. Earth's biosphere is a (relatively) closed system regarding matter, some meteorites and dust enter and only limited matter leaves due to gravity (e.g. some space rockets, dust).

The First and Second Laws of Thermodynamics (LoTD) and Laws for conservation of matter (LCoM) set limiting conditions for life on earth: The First Law says that energy is conserved; nothing disappears, its form simply changes (e.g. heat, movement). Another way of stating this is: "Energy cannot be created, or destroyed, only modified in form." The implications of the Second Law and second law of conservation of matter, are that matter and energy tend to disperse over time. For matter this is referred to as "entropy." Putting the different laws together and applying them to our planetary system, the following facts become apparent:

- All the matter that will ever exist on earth is here now (1st LCoM).
- Disorder increases in all closed systems and the Earth is a closed system with respect to matter (2nd LCoM). However, it is an open system with respect to energy since it receives energy from the sun, and radiates waste heat to space.
- Sunlight, or energy radiation, (LoTD) is responsible for almost all increases in net material quality on the planet through photosynthesis and solar heating effects. Chloroplasts in plant cells take energy (and minerals and oxygen) from sunlight for plant growth (Sugars, structure, oxygen). Plants, in turn, provide energy for other forms of life, such as animals. Evaporation of water from the oceans by solar heating produces most of the Earth's fresh water. This flow of energy from the sun creates structure and order from the disorder.
- The global ecosystem and its local ecosystems evolved over time into a complex adaptive system with many interdependencies.

==== Social system ====
A social (sub-)system also is a complex adaptive system. Trust is essential in the smooth workings of societal systems and can be seen as the glue binding society (economically, politically, socially). A lack of trust, e.g. in the future and each other, creates societal unrest and instability as individuals and (sub-)systems within society will attempt to continue to satisfy Individual fundamental human needs (as articulated by Manfred Max-Neef, among others).

Being able to keep one's health, influence of how the system is organised, learn & develop to become the best one can be; equal treatment and pursuing a larger purpose are important factors to trust and 'believe in' the system one is part of.

==== Human influence ====
Based on the whole-system understanding and research focusing on the causes rather than the effects of unsustainability within the socio-ecological system lead to 8 main causes of unsustainability.

These main causes of unsustainability are in two groups of, as follows:

- The ecological system is systematically subject to:
1. Concentrations of substances extracted from the Earth's crust (e.g. mining of fossil fuels, metals, minerals)
2. Systematic increases in concentrations of substances produced by society (e.g. creation of plastics, toxins, purified substances, sugar, nanochemicals)
3. Systematic increases in physical degradation of ecosystems (e.g. deforestation, over-harvesting, fishing methods, unnatural barriers, introduction of exotic species, leakages of extracted or created substances)
- The people in the social systems are systematically subject to barriers to trusting relationships, due to structural obstacles to:
1. Health, i.e. injury and illness (physical, physiological, psychological, emotional) (e.g. dangerous working contortions or insufficient rest)
2. Influence, i.e. inability to participate in shaping the social systems of which they are a part (e.g. suppression of free speech, opinions ignored)
3. Competence, i.e. inability to develop and increase proficiency individually or together (e.g. obstacles to education - informal, formal or professional)
4. Impartiality, i.e. treated differently for any reason other than competency (e.g. sexism, racism, homophobia, classism, etc.)
5. Meaning-making, i.e. hindered from creating and co-creation meaning in our lives (e.g. suppression of cultural expression, etc.)

These latter 5 are the result of recent research led by Dr Merlina Missimer. By providing significant granularity on the root causes of social systemunsustainability, it is increasingly replacing the previous single, and very high-level, cause of social system unsustainability:

- Systematic increases in setting barriers for peoples capacity to meet their needs (e.g. inequality, discrimination, long working hours, access to healthcare, torture, right to demonstrate or vote, land grabbing, corruption, deny education). For example the Future-Fit Business Benchmark uses the 8 causes of unsustainability.

Previously, these were called the system conditions to be met so as not to degrade the socio-ecological system.

=== FSSD Success Level ===
In 1989, Robèrt wrote a paper describing the system conditions for sustainability, given these laws of nature amongst others. He sent it to 50 scientists, asking that they tell him what was wrong with his paper. On version 22, Robèrt had scientific consensus on what was to become The Framework for Strategic Sustainable Development (FSSD) (Originally The Natural Step Framework. This was first published in a peer-reviewed academic journal in 1991 under the title "From the Big Bang to Sustainable Societies".

Since then there have been 2 more rounds of scientific consensus on the Framework, one was initiated by Paul Hawken in the USA (1994), one took place in Australia. Since the initial version several changes to the wording of the principles have been made (2001, 2006, 2015)., and an ongoing program of additional research, application and practice around the world.

==== Sustainability principles ====
The current FSSD's definition of sustainability includes eight sustainability principles (first order scientific principles) or criteria for redesign. The first three are ecological sustainability principles, the latter five as social sustainability principles. Together they describe a strongly sustainable society within a strongly sustainable ecological system:

"In a sustainable society nature is not subject to systematically increasing concentrations of…

1. … substances extracted from the Earth's crust;
2. … substances produced as a byproduct of society;
3. … degradation by physical means,

…and people are not subject to structural obstacles to…

1. … health;
2. … influence;
3. … competence;
4. … impartiality; and
5. … meaning-making

Again, the last five social sustainability principles extended a single social sustainability principle:(Missimer, et al.,2017)

"and in that society… people are not subject to conditions that systematically undermine their capacity to meet their needs."(Henrik Ny, et al., 2006)

The eight sustainability principles can be reworded, to simplify understanding and to apply to any society, organization or product. In short, to become a sustainable society we must:

1. … eliminate our contribution to the progressive buildup of substances extracted from the Earth's crust;
2. … eliminate our contribution to the progressive buildup of chemicals and compounds produced by society;
3. … eliminate our contribution to the progressive physical degradation and destruction of nature and natural processes; and
4. … eliminate our contribution to structural obstacles to: health; influence; competence; impartiality and; meaning-making. [4]

The negative wording is often debated as the use of 'not' can have a negative emotional connotation. As in a game with game rules, it doesn't tell you everything you should do, they leave that up to the imagination of the players, they allow you to do anything as long as it is within all agreed rules of the game. The restrictions set by these 'rules of the game' stimulate creativity as they are applied in personal, professional or community planning and decision-making. On the success level organizations, institutes and individuals add their own (secondary) principles of success based on their specific context or needs.

=== FSSD - Strategic Level ===
==== Strategic ====
Often confused with Strategy. To be able to be strategic, one needs to know where one wants to be or where one is heading.

==== Backcasting ====
The framework bases its planning approach on a concept called backcasting and more specifically backcasting from sustainability principles. Backcasting is the process of moving backwards from an imagined vision of success. One begins with an end in mind, moves backwards from the vision to the present, and moves step-by-step towards the vision. It is essentially placing ourselves in the future, imagining that we have achieved success and looking back to ask the question: “What do we need to do today to reach that successful outcome?”. Instead of picturing how success could look like, backcasting is advocated from a principled vision of success in which specific conditions are met creates a shared understanding of success.

Different general strategies can be applied to reach success based on a general understanding of the system including:

- Dematerialisation across the entire life cycle of a product or process.
- Substitution of materials that do not comply with the sustainability principles by those that do.
- Applying the precautionary principle
- Applying the 'Golden rule' ('do not do to others what you do not want them to do to you')

=== FSSD - Actions ===
The actions that you can do within the strategy to reach success within the system e.g. Raise awareness on specific sustainability topics, education programs on what sustainability is and how it could be approached, selecting different suppliers based on sustainability criteria, designing or implementing policies, analyze the life cycle of a product, create a sustainability report, facilitate a dialogue with specific stakeholders around a particular challenge, etc.

=== FSSD - Tools Level ===
A variety of tools and concepts can be supportive when addressing sustainability. Informed by the framework and priorities of actions can help to select and implement the appropriate tools. Tools can then be optimally used: for the purpose they were designed to do together with other complementary tools.

==== ABCD Method ====
The ABCD method is the approach with which the framework backcasting from the 8 sustainability principles can be applied to an organization. The letters represent the following steps (FSSD academic ABCD and TNS ABCD method differ slightly):

A: Awareness and visioning. After understanding the system your organization works within and the principles, members of the organization create a vision on how they would like the organization to be. Organisations should also identify the service they provide, independent of the product, sparking more creative goals.

B: Baseline assessment. The organisation analyses and maps what it has been doing currently and evaluates it based on the 4 principles. It allows for the organisation to identify critical issues, implications and opportunities.

C: Creative solutions. Members of the organisation brainstorm for solutions to the issues raised previously, without constraint. With the vision and potential actions, organisations backcast to develop strategies for sustainability.

D: Decide on priorities. The organisation prioritizes the different actions developed previously that help gear it to sustainability in the fastest and most optimal way, by asking a set of questions: by asking: i) Does this action move us in the right direction? ii) Can this action be built upon in future? iii) Does this action bring an acceptable financial, ecological and/or social return on investment?. This step involves step-by-step implementation and planning.

Backcasting is continually used to assess and evaluate the actions, to determine if the organisation is moving towards the vision set in 'A'.

==== Interfaces with other tools and concepts ====
Much research has been done on the interfacing of the FSSD with other known tools and concepts within the sustainable development arena (Interfaces with most sustainability tools and concepts have been described). Below various examples:

- Factor X; Factor 4; Factor 10; biological footprinting; IS0 14001; EMAS; EMS
- Global Reporting Initiative - Mind The Gap! Strategically Driving GRI Sustainability Reporting Towards Sustainability.

==== Tools based on the Framework ====
Furthermore, various tools and other forms of support have been developed by and in collaboration with TNS. Others have been inspired by, or based upon the TNS framework, some more rigorous than others. Below various examples:

- Future-Fit Business Benchmark co-developed with TNS practitioners
- Strategic Life Cycle Assessment (SLCA)
- VinylVerified Product Label a product label for specific PVC building applications in Europe.
- Living Building Challenge (LBC)
- Sustainable Apparel Coalition Higgs Index, or Materials Sustainability Index as originally developed by Nike in collaboration with The Natural Step.

== Applications of the Framework ==
The framework is applicable to organisations (of any sector, size, location), processes, products, services, business models. It can be used to analyse other sustainability tools and concepts and strengthens other tools by placing them in the context and focus on what they are designed to do.

When applied correctly, also the business case for sustainability and the sustainability case for business are taken into account to create inspiring cases and best practices. Sustainable Growth Associates, representing The Natural Step Germany adapted the generic ABCD approach into an ADVISE approach applicable to business strategy.

== On making change happen ==
In an article in In Context (1991), Robèrt described how The Natural Step Framework would create change:

I don't believe that the solutions in society will come from the left or the right or the north or the south. They will come from islands within those organizations; islands of people with integrity who want to do something... This is what a network should do — identify the people who would like to do something good. And they are everywhere. This is how the change will appear — you won't notice the difference. It won't be anyone winning over anyone. It will just spread. One day you don't need any more signs saying "Don't spit on the floor," or "Don't put substances in the lake which can't be processed." It will be so natural. It will be something that the intelligent people do, and nobody will say that it was due to The Natural Step or your magazine. It will just appear.

Eco-municipalities, based on the Natural Step's system conditions, originated in Sweden. Over 80 municipalities and several regions (25 percent of all Swedish municipalities) have adopted the TNS sustainability principles based on the system conditions. There are now 12 eco-municipalities in the United States and the American Planning Association has adopted sustainability objectives based on the same principles. Communities such as Whistler and Dawson Creek,

In addition to the Canadian provinces of Alberta and British Columbia, corporations such as Interface, Nike, Inc., ICI Paints, Scandic Hotels, Max Hamburgers, and IKEA have also adopted the framework and have become more sustainable as a result. Each of these companies have completely re-thought their business and have examined and changed all their processes including purchase of materials, manufacturing, transportation, construction of facilities, maintenance and waste management.

The Natural Step was introduced to the Northwest region of the United States through three one-day conferences introduced by Northwest Earth Institute.

== See also ==
- Eco-municipality
- Triple bottom line
- Living Building Challenge
