= Karl-Henrik Robèrt =

Swedish scientist

Karl-Henrik Robèrt (born 1947), is a Swedish cancer scientist and an important figure in the worldwide sustainability movement. He is known for the Framework for Strategic Sustainable Development - also known as The Natural Step Framework, after the not for profit promoting and applying it - a framework that lays out the system conditions for sustainability, that arose from his consultations with municipalities, businesses, government departments, environmental organizations, and the arts community. Having secured the imprimatur of the King of Sweden, The Natural Step was launched with attendant television coverage and distribution of educational material to every school and household in Sweden.

The FSSD/The Natural Step framework sets out the system conditions for sustainability, as well as guidelines to systematically approach compliance with the principles. The framework has been applied to fields as diverse as agriculture, forestry, energy systems, information and selection of tools for sustainable development, green building and the ecological management of river basins. The Natural Step aims to be both scientifically based and readily understandable in its articulation of principles for sustainability.

== Cancer research ==
His 1979 doctoral dissertation, at the Karolinska Institute in Sweden, studied leukemia. As head of the Division of Clinical Hematology and Oncology at the Department of Medicine at the Huddinge Hospital, Stockholm, Sweden and director of research at the Karolinska Institute, he conducted research and lectured widely on several forms of cancer, including leukemia, lymphoma and lung cancer.

From his study of cancerous cells, he realized that “cells are the unifying unit of all living things. The difference between our cells and the cells of plants are so minor that it's almost embarrassing; the makeup is almost identical all the way down to the molecular level.” The natural and the human worlds are both built of cells. His studies led him to realize that cancer rates and other threats to global health, would only increase with increasing concentrations of pollutants and other unsustainable mechanisms. His focus on toxins and their health implications, led him to see the link between these and a systems perspective on future health.

== Environmental concerns ==
Research on damage to human cells underscored, for Robèrt, the importance of environmental concerns. He observed that since the late 19th Century, humans have been increasingly interfering with natural processes. He characterized many of the processes of modern society as linear (unidirectional, such as extractive mining technologies) that were producing garbage at unprecedented rates — not only that visible in garbage dumps, but also unseen molecular garbage. Since "all linear processes must eventually come to an end," the only way to save ourselves from the consequences, in his view, would be to restore the cyclical processes of nature:

For roughly the past hundred years, humans have been disrupting the cyclical processes of nature at an accelerating pace. All human societies are, in varying degrees, now processing natural resources in a linear direction. Our resources are being rapidly transformed into useless garbage, some of which is obvious to the naked eye, but most of which escapes awareness. The smaller portion can be seen in garbage dumps and other visible waste. By far the larger portion can be thought of as "molecular garbage" - consisting of the vast quantities of tiny particles that are daily spewed out into the earth's air, water and soil.

With few exceptions, none of this garbage finds its way back into the cycles of society or nature; it is not taken up for repeated use by industry, nor is it put back into the soil. As a result of poor or non-existent planning, the volume of garbage is too large for nature to reassimilate, and some of it - toxic metals and stable unnatural compounds - cannot be processed by the cells at all.

He has argued against a proliferation of definitions of what constitutes sustainability. He promotes a change in "human life-styles and forms of societal organization that are based on cyclic processes compatible with the earth's natural cycles."

== Origin of The Natural Step ==
In 1989, he circulated a paper on sustainability to 50 scientists, asking for their input. The extensive deliberative process involved 22 versions, but a consensus emerged that led to The Natural Step.

In 1994 this process was repeated in the US, led by Paul Hawken and also in Australia.

== Awards and honours ==
In cancer research, Robèrt won the 1984 Swedish Hematological Association Research Award. In environmental sustainability, he won the Green Cross Award for International Leadership in 1999. He was awarded The Social Responsibility Laureate Medal by the Global Center for Leadership & Business Ethics. In 2000, he was awarded the Blue Planet Prize, often referred to as the "Nobel Prize" of ecological sustainability, "for scientifically laying out the systems perspective needed to plan strategically for sustainability and for changing the environmental awareness of business, municipalities and others." In 2005 Robèrt received the Social Responsibility Laureate Medal by the Global Center for Leadership & Business Ethics. He was included in the publication 100 Visionaries of the 20th Century in 2006. In 2009, he was recognized as an Ashoka Fellow. and in 2011 as Ashoka Globalizer.
