= Vinnova =

- Type: Government Agency
- Industry: Research and Development
- Founded: 1 January 2001
- Headquarters: Sweden
- Key people: Director General Darja Isaksson
- Parent: Ministry of Climate and Enterprise of Sweden
- Website: www.vinnova.se

Vinnova (Verket för innovationssystem), or the Swedish Agency for Innovation Systems, is the Swedish government agency that administers state funding for research and development. The agency's mission as defined by the government is to promote development of efficient and innovative Swedish systems within the areas of technology, transportation, communication and labour.

The agency does this by giving financial aid to companies for research, development and legal costs. Horizon 2020 | EU grant for research and innovation | Vinnova

The Director General of Vinnova since May 2018 is Darja Isaksson.
