= Tracy Corkhill =

Fictional character from Brookside

- Brookside character
- Portrayed by: Justine Kerrigan
- Duration: 1985–1992, 2003
- First appearance: 10 September 1985
- Last appearance: 4 January 2003
- Created by: Phil Redmond
- Spin-off appearances: South (1988)
In-universe information
- Occupation: Student; Hairdresser
- Father: Billy Corkhill
- Mother: Doreen Corkhill
- Stepmother: Sheila Grant
- Brothers: Rod Corkhill
- Grandfathers: Albie Corkhill; Albert Brogan
- Grandmothers: Margaret Corkhill; Julia Brogan
- Uncles: Jimmy Corkhill; Frankie Corkhill
- First cousins: Lindsey Corkhill; Little Jimmy Corkhill; William Corkhill
- Other relatives: Don Corkhill; Joan Brogan

Tracy Corkhill is a fictional character from the British Channel 4 soap opera Brookside, played by Justine Kerrigan. The character debuted on-screen during the episode broadcast on 10 September 1985. Tracy was introduced as part of a new family, the Corkhills, which also includes her brother Rod Corkhill (Jason Hope) and their parents Doreen Corkhill (Kate Fitzgerald) and Billy Corkhill (John McArdle). Kerrigan had previously appeared as a guest character, Pat in 1984. She auditioned for the role after her grandfather and actor Peter Kerrigan encouraged her. Kerrigan was aged fourteen and still attending school when she took on the role. Tracy is characterised as brash and headstrong. She has aspirations of becoming a model but settles for a hairdressing career. Kerrigan disliked Tracy's style and early persona. Tracy transformed into a more adult character over time and Kerrigan admired her newfound attitude.

Writers often created controversial storylines for the character. The first notable instance was Tracy being sexually abused by her geography teacher Peter Montague (Mark Draper). Her later relationship with Jamie Henderson (Sean McKee) proved equally as controversial. Writers included a scene in which Billy discovers Tracy and Jamie's contraceptives, which conveyed the pair were practising safe sex. Brookside's producer Phil Redmond was forced to defend the show against complaints raised by the British regulatory body, Independent Broadcasting Authority. They accused the show of showing the product for too long but Redmond convinced them it was educatory content. Thames Television commissioned a spin-off series titled South, which focused on Tracy and Jamie's attempts to live in London. It was broadcast in March 1988 and lasted two episodes. In 1989, writers used Tracy to explore the issue of work place sexual harassment.

Tracy's later involvement with her stepmother Sheila Grant (Sue Johnston) and her relationship with Barry Grant (Paul Usher) were some of Kerrigan's favourite stories. She relished working with Johnston and Usher, which in her opinion created her best acting performances. Writers continued to give Kerrigan dramatic stories. In 1990, Tracy meets Liam Riley (Adam Sunderland) who becomes besotted with her, eventually committing suicide when she rejects him. Kerrigan assessed that the story helped Tracy grow up and become likeable. Another issue lead plot featured Mark Potter (Paul Crosby) attempting to rape Tracy. In 1992, the character was written out of Brookside and Kerrigan was upset because writers failed to create a prominent departure story. Kerrigan later reprised the role during the episode broadcast on 4 January 2003.

== Casting ==
On 21 August 1985, it was announced that Kerrigan had joined the cast of Brookside, playing Tracy Corkhill. She was part of a new family being introduced into the series. Kerrigan had previously appeared in Brookside during 1984 as the guest character Pat, who was a girlfriend of established character Damon Grant (Simon O'Brien). Prior to this, Kerrigan had no previous acting experience and did not attend drama school. She was informed about the role from her grandfather, the actor Peter Kerrigan. She recalled not being nervous during the audition process because acting was not something she wanted to pursue when she was young. Producers liked Kerrigan and believed she was ideal to play Tracy, which made Kerrigan happy as she disliked school. She later told Karen Swayne from Chat that joining Brookside "did not seem that brilliant" because "it all went over my head at first." She added it took one year for her to really enjoy the experience.

Joining her on-screen was Jason Hope playing her brother Rod and Kate Fitzgerald and John McArdle, as parents Doreen and Billy Corkhill respectively. Roy West of Liverpool Echo announced their casting alongside Kerrigan's and Tracy was described as an "attractive, headstrong girl". West added that the Corkhills had previously lived in a council housing estate and consider their move to Brookside Close as an ascent up the social class hierarchy. Rod was the final member of the Corkhill family to be cast. After a successful audition, he was required to do a screen test with Kerrigan to assess their compatibility in the sibling roles.

Kerrigan was age fourteen when she took on the role. Brookside producer Stuart Doughty revealed that Kerrigan and Hope were only allowed to film a limited number of episodes because they were still at school. Working alongside adults pressurised Kerrigan to grow up quickly and she quit her studies to accommodate filming commitments. Kerrigan later told Nick Fisher from TV Guide that she did not understand what working with adults entailed or how her personality would change. She added that "I kept behaving in the way I thought was expected to behave because otherwise I wouldn't have got any respect from the cast." Kerrigan made her first appearance as Tracy on 10 September 1985 during the show's 300th episode.

== Development ==
=== Characterisation ===
In the book, Brookside: The Official Companion, show creator Phil Redmond described Rod and Tracy as appearing "ordinary enough" until viewers learn Rod wants to become a policeman and Tracy has aspirations of becoming a model. The Corkhills are from a council housing estate and this plays into their characterisation. Tracy's mother, Doreen dreamed of a better life for her family and Billy loved her enough to risk financial ruin. They had to save enough money to purchase a house on Brookside Close. Gladys Ambrose also joined the cast as Tracy's grandmother, Julia Brogan. Ambrose had previously worked professionally with Kerrigan's real life grandfather Peter, portraying a married couple. Julia moves into the Corkhill house and shares a room with Tracy and her presence annoys Billy. Tracy is characterised as "a girl who knows her own mind and likes to be independent". But her family's financial problems prevent her from living her dream of becoming a model. Geoff Tibballs, author of Brookside - The First Ten Years, described Tracy as "wilful, headstrong and downright surly, Tracy was no loss to the diplomatic corps." Kerrigan agreed with Tibballs' assessment and revealed that Tracy was initially disliked. She explained other characters viewed her as a "little cow" because "she wound people up and managed to fallout with everyone." Tracy's characterisation was owed to being member of the volatile Corkhill family. Tracy had an attitude that annoyed others and she gained Billy's stubbornness. Kerrigan stated that personality wise she understood her character because they both came from a "working class background".

Kerrigan believed that it took five years to fully develop Tracy. She originally disliked Tracy but this changed once Tracy found her independence. In 1990, Kerrigan told TV Guide's Fisher that "Tracy's only just started to grow up. She started to do things off her own bat for once." Had Tracy existed as an actual person, Kerrigan would not associate with her because of her attitude and hair dressing temperament. While interviewed by Tibballs, she quipped "I wouldn't want to meet Tracy Corkhill, and I certainly wouldn't want to have my hair done by her." Despite this, Kerrigan respected certain aspects of Tracy's persona and thought her brashness was desirable. She told Fisher that "I'd like to be able to speak the way she does. She'll say anything to anyone and doesn't care what they say back. She has an attitude of 'I'll say what I like and I'll do what I like!' That's the sort of attitude I want to get." Later that year, Kerrigan had grown to like her character to the extent that she stated "nothing annoys me about Tracy now."

Tracy's style was a particular concern for Kerrigan. She recalled that Tracy had "very stupid hair styles" and was even voted the worst dressed TV character in a magazine poll. She thought Tracy was no trendsetter and said "I hope nobody was influenced as she was so badly dressed." Despite this, Tracy was keen on fashion trends. Kerrigan assessed that Liverpool was one of the UK's best dressed places. Therefore it was "no wonder Tracy is keen on fashion." Kerrigan disliked Tracy's "dead plain" clothing she wore in early episodes. In comparison, writers created a "punk phase" for the character. Tracy was styled with "all mod blond hair and black eyes" via make-up. Kerrigan really disliked this era and called it "awful". By 1989, producers had given Kerrigan more freedom over Tracy's hair styles and fashion choices.

To become a successful hairdresser, Tracy had to overcome much adversity despite not having a genuine interest in the profession. She faces sexual harassment at work and is fired from her job. She wins an industrial tribunal for sexual harassment and returns to work. The stories revitalised Tracy's career and she even entered a hairdressing competition. Off-screen, Kerrigan's mother was a hairdresser, which gave her experience she remembered and applied to the role.

=== Sexual abuse ===
Writers created a controversial story for Tracy via a romance with her geography teacher Peter Montague (Mark Draper). The story was broadcast during the characters initial months on-screen. Tracy develops feelings for Peter and during a school skiing trip in Switzerland, Peter reciprocates. Upon their return to Liverpool, fellow pupils begin rumours and Rod discovers graffiti disclosing their affair. Billy learns that his daughter is being abused and attacks Peter. Billy is arrested for assault and given a three-month prison sentence, suspended for one-year. At the time, The Guardian journalist Lucy O'Brien described it as the "most dramatic analysis" of child abuse on television. She described it as a "devastating family problem" in which Billy had to grasp the fact his "wayward daughter" was in love with her teacher; the story subsequently played out over a "tense month". Kerrigan later told author Matt Jacobson that despite the abuse story generating tabloid press attention, she never felt pressure at work. During any of Tracy's controversial stories, Kerrigan "just turned up to work, did the job and went home."

The story also attracted criticism of Brookside and accusations of irresponsibility from the British MP Geoffrey Dickens. He claimed producers were using sensationalism to boost ratings and outdo other soap operas. Brookside's press officer, Janice Troup responded to Dickens' accusations directly. She stated that the show's writers were "treating the storyline very sensitively and will do nothing to offend the viewers." She also refuted claims her company was trying to win a ratings competition with Coronation Street and EastEnders. It was also revealed that scriptwriters scheduled a meeting on 6 January 1986, to discuss a suitable resolve to the storyline. Tracy's story was also ridiculed by school teachers. McArdle defended the story's realism and applauded Brookside for tackling a current social issue, noting that there had been many instances of school based sexual abuse reported in the news.

Writers used the story to create additional subplots for Tracy which linked to her modelling aspirations. Tracy pursues the career until a female photographer tries to scam her. The photographer believes she can make money selling Tracy's modelling photos to tabloid newspapers, who were interested in her relationship with Peter. She attempts to convince Tracy to pose topless but Tracy refuses and gives up modelling. She later takes a job as a tea-maker at a hairdressing salon via a Youth Training Scheme.

=== Jamie Henderson ===
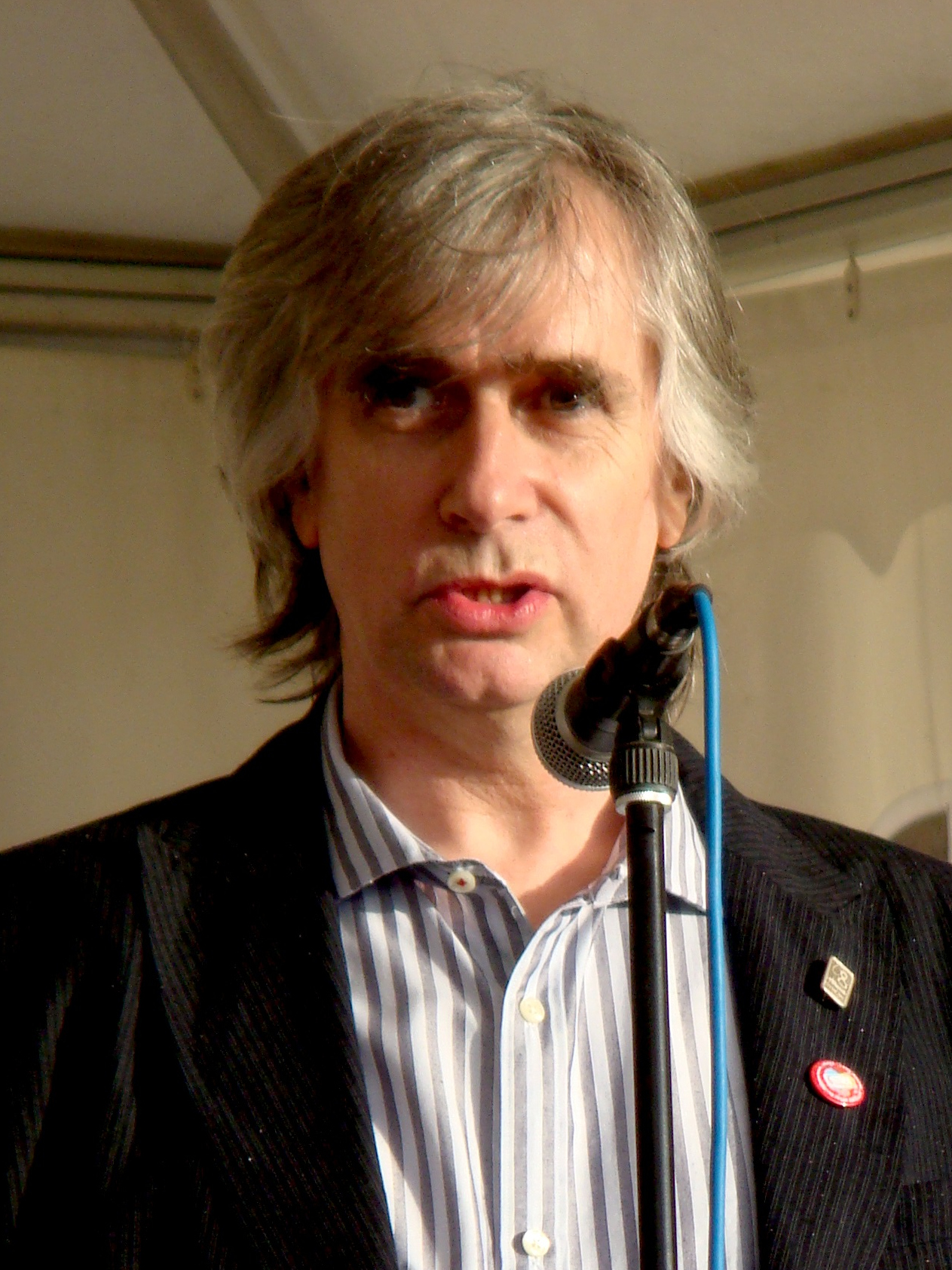
Brookside creator Phil Redmond (pictured) was forced to defend Tracy and Jamie's storyline to the Independent Broadcasting Authority.

Writers gave Tracy a love interest when they introduced Jamie Henderson (Sean McKee). Their relationship proved controversial during an episode which features Billy discovering a packet of Durex branded condoms belonging to Tracy and Jamie. The scene depicted Billy viewing the condom's branding, which was visible for 1.83 seconds. This visibility created controversy and the British regulatory body, Independent Broadcasting Authority (IBA) lodged a complaint against the show, accusing the scene of being broadcast for a prolonged time. The show's broadcaster, Channel 4 asked Phil Redmond for a response to submit to the IBA. He responded in detail about Brookside wanting to promote safe sex and educate viewers during the 1980s AIDS crisis, which was then a prominent social issue in the United Kingdom. The scene clearly demonstrated that Tracy and Jamie were practising safe sex. The IBA changed their stance on the issue and told Redmond that it was an "absolutely marvellous" idea. Redmond thought their response was strange and accused them of being easily fobbed off with "long, considered and perhaps bullshit" answers. Redmond had also told them they prolonged the feature of Durex branding to help illiterate viewers better understand, which also pleased the IBA. Despite the favourable ruling, Redmond later admitted the scene was probably prolonged simply "to make the edit work".

Producers heavily invested time into their relationship, with Tracy and Jamie being given their own spin-off series titled, South. The miniseries consisted of two thirty-minute episodes which were broadcast during a daytime slot in March 1988. Production worked with Thames Television to co-produce the series. South was written by Frank Cottrell-Boyce and was shot on film unlike Brookside episodes which were recorded on videotape. South producer Peter Griffiths told Ken Irwin from the Daily Mirror that "we're aiming at a hard hitting drama which explores urgent issues facing young people today - like unemployment and living conditions." The episodes featured Tracy and Jamie leaving Liverpool intent on beginning a new life in London. It follows there subsequent troubles as they attempt to make friends and seek employment. Jamie quickly accepts leaving was a mistake and books them a ticket to return home. Tracy however leaves Jamie and disappears in London alone. McKee told Roy West of Liverpool Echo that this was because Tracy quite likes the party lifestyle displayed to her. In juxtaposition Jamie finds it difficult to adjust and lacks employment opportunities. McKee told Irwin that naïve Tracy and Jamie "come to London in search of a new life together, thinking the streets are paved with gold." British singer Morrissey also makes a cameo appearance in the series and is featured in a scene with Tracy. Kerrigan found filming South a memorable experience, especially with Morrissey's cameo. She found it completely different to filming Brookside content. It was her first experience working for a larger company and she stated Thames Television had a bigger spending budget. They paid for chauffeurs and a winnebago for Kerrigan. She later commented "Boyce wrote us a lovely script and it was just a pleasure. I'm so grateful for that experience." Kerrigan also revealed that she was contracted with Brookside until September but would definitely stay there after.

South's storylines ran in conjunction with the main series. When Jamie returns home, Brookside episodes showed Jamie and Rod going back to London to locate Tracy and convince her to return home. To promote South, producers hosted a press screening event in London. Kerrigan thought it was surreal viewing invitations to the event with her image on them. The spin-off proved less successful with viewers than its predecessor Damon and Debbie. After the series, Kerrigan worked with other cast members to promote awareness of homelessness. Kerrigan revealed that working on South "really thought me a great deal about the problems of being alone and homelessness." Tracy and Jamie's relationship was abruptly ended and Tracy's stories were quickly rewritten due to an altercation during filming. McKee was fired from Brookside following an argument with a director, Nick Lauchland. McKee refused to wear a jumper that Lauchland had chosen for him and when Redmond got involved, McKee told him to "stuff" his job and he was instantly dismissed.

=== Sexual harassment ===
In 1988, Vanessa Whitburn took on the role of a producer at Brookside. She stated her intention that the show would focus more prominently on its younger characters, Tracy in particular. In 1989, Tracy was featured in yet a further issue based story exploring work place sexual harassment. It begins when her manager, Gerrard Holt (Tom Sharkey) makes sexual advances towards Tracy in her work place. Tracy she rebuffs Gerrard's advances and he fires from her hairdressing job. Tracy takes Gerrard to an industrial tribunal accusing him of sexual harassment, which she wins and she returns to her former role.

The story portrayed the reality of sexual harassment and the misery it can cause victims. To accurately portray the issue, Kerrigan researched the story in detail. She spoke to women who had experienced sexual harassment. Kerrigan recalled she told Helen Macklin (Sunday Mercury) that many women approached her willing to share their stories. She found this research valuable to her portrayal. She explained "not having experienced it for myself I was grateful for their help, because it is such a delicate and controversial subject and I wanted to know as much about it as possible." Kerrigan also researched sexual harassment with the Equal Opportunities Commission. They informed her of poor working conditions for women and low salaries within the hairdressing industry. Kerrigan was surprised by her findings and was glad she never became a hairdresser herself.

The court scenes feature Tracy takings Gerrard to court for unfair dismissal on the grounds of sexual harassment. Writers decided to feature the entire court hearing on-screen to educate viewers. Kerrigan recalled that filming the scenes made her nervous. She told Macklin that "on the day of recording everyone was supposed to be on edge, and it was very long and tiring because we were desperate to get it right." Kerrigan credited the scriptwriters for creating good content, which she believed made filming easier. Prior to broadcast the outcome of the trial was kept secret from viewers. Kerrigan told Julia Clarke (Daily Record) that "men like Gerrard are horrible, preying on girls who are vulnerable." She was happy Tracy stands up for her rights because "no woman should have to fear for her personal safety at work." Sharkey's portrayal was so convincing, he began to receive verbal abuse in public spaces. The story also aided Tracy's character development. Kerrigan viewed Tracy as no longer being selfish and had started to look after herself.

=== Barry Grant and abortion ===
"Having the opportunity to work with Paul Usher day to day was great, in fact the whole time in the Corkhill's when Sheila moved in and Barry and Tracy were an item was a real purple patch for me."

— Kerrigan on the merged Corkhill and Grant families. (2020)

Tracy's mother Doreen was written out of Brookside when Fitzgerald chose to leave the show. On-screen, Tracy is upset and cries for her mother to return home. Fitzgerald recalled that she watched the scene and "sat at home and wept. It was too painful for me." After Doreen's departure writers paired Billy with Sheila Grant (Sue Johnston). Tracy is opposed to their relationship and voices her disapproval. Kerrigan told Tibballs that "she certainly didn't make it easy for Billy and Sheila, but then she's never been afraid to speak her mind." Kerrigan believed that the real issue for Tracy was that she actually liked Sheila, despite trying not to. Kerrigan began to relish working with Johnston and "really upped her game" acting wise. Kerrigan later assessed that her "best performances" occurred via their shared scenes. In 1990, Tracy begins a relationship with Sheila's son Barry Grant (Paul Usher). The story begins when Tracy and Barry sleep together. Ken Irwin from Daily Mirror reported that Barry initially uses Tracy to annoy Sheila and Billy. But afterwards they decide to pursue a relationship. A Brookside publicist revealed that the relationship would produce "some furious family rows" and result in Tracy being forced out of her home. The duo's relationship is awkward because Billy's existing relationship with Sheila. Tracy moves out and gets a flat of her own, where the pair find it easier to continue their romance. Their parents however are unhappy and try to convince them to break-up. Tracy and Barry's romance was further developed over five months of episodes, at which point Tracy discovers that she is pregnant with Barry's child. Kerrigan thought the decision to have Billy, Sheila, Tracy and Barry as a family unit was a run of success.

Their relationship is tested when Tracy meets a customer Liam Riley (Adam Sunderland). He develops an obsession with Tracy, begins to pester her and declares his love. Liam purchases an engraved bracelet for Tracy and tries to kiss her. Barry retaliates by throwing Liam out of Tracy's salon. She decides to put Liam off by revealing her pregnancy to him. Liam is devastated and decides to commit suicide by throwing himself off a building. Kerrigan liked Liam's suicide plot because it allowed Tracy to be the main character "in a big storyline". Kerrigan described it as "very different" from any of Tracy's previous storylines. Tracy had always been given "very grown up" stories by writers, but Liam's suicide changed her. Kerrigan later acknowledged that the story was pivotal in Tracy's character development, believing from there on "Tracy seemed to grow up and take responsibility for her life. I quite liked her then."

Tracy later decides to end her relationship with Barry. Writers created an abortion story in which Tracy ignores Barry's pleas and terminates the pregnancy. Kerrigan described as a "really powerful storyline" for the character. The realism of the story caused a woman to be approach Kerrigan in a nightclub and discuss her own experiences of an abortion. Kerrigan recalled that she felt obliged to listen to the women's personal story. Kerrigan enjoyed filming the abortion storyline. She told Chat's Swayne that "I like doing the dramatic scenes. I loved doing all the abortion stuff, it was great." Kerrigan preferred acting out Tracy's depressing stories because she had a moody personality. Kerrigan believed she "looked dead phony" during comedic scenes which required greater effort. Kerrigan added that liked working with Usher and refined her acting technique via their shared scenes.

In October 1990, producers decided to give Tracy a more light-hearted storyline following her abortion. They featured her and her best friend Nikki White (Michelle Byatt) go on a club 18-30 holiday to Rhodes, as Tracy tries to forget Barry. The story was filmed on location on the island, but filming was challenging. Kerrigan revealed that "I knew it was going to be lots of hard work." Obstacles that marred filming the story included high temperatures, local police asking to see their working permits, tourists looking directly into filming cameras and topless sunbathers in view. The story was embargoed but the Daily Mirror leaked plot details and an image of Kerrigan and Mario Frangoulis (Aki) on set. Journalist Tony Purnell claimed the story was an attempt to reengage the audience following falling ratings. Brookside had featured too many "doom and gloom" stories and were creating something more light. On-screen, Tracy and Nikki are romanced by local Greek residents Sampikos Sarikas (Chris Constantinou) and Aki. Writers used the Corkhill family home to set up a collective of characters in a house share scenario. On-screen Tracy decides let Nikki and Tommo (John O'Gorman) move in with her. Tracy is later fired from her job at the salon for stealing clients. She then sets up her own mobile hairdressing business.

=== Attempted rape, departure and return ===
In 1989, Jimmy McGovern who was working as a writer on Brookside wanted to create a story about the Hillsborough disaster. The disaster was a fatal human crush during a football match at Hillsborough Stadium in Sheffield, South Yorkshire and had occurred the previous year. McGovern wanted to create a story about the effects the disaster had on Tracy. His story pitch was blocked and caused an argument in production and McGovern quit the show in protest.

In 1991, writers created a new issue lead story for Tracy involving an attempted rape. The story begins when Rod is attacked at a pub and Tracy meets his police colleague Mark Potter (Paul Crosby) and an attraction develops between them. Barry tells Tracy that he wants to restart their romantic relationship, but she declines because she is dating Mark. Despite this, Tracy was conflicted over her feelings for Barry, who becomes more present in her life. Barry and Mark develop a personal vendetta and rivalry over Tracy. When Mark realises the extent of Tracy's feelings for Barry, he tries to rape her in her home. Tracy defends herself by stabbing him in the arm with a pair of hairdressing scissors. Rod deals with the situation by telling Mark to leave the police force. He leaves the area after applying for a transfer.

In 1991, Kerrigan became pregnant and continued to film until six-months into her pregnancy. She revealed that she agreed the date with producers, who she claimed were understanding. However, report by Clive Hadfield from the Sunday Mirror revealed that writers were forced to hastily rewrite Tracy's storylines. Kerrigan told Hadfield that she was unaware of writers intentions for Tracy but assumed it would not be dramatic. She added that the writers "have said nothing to me, so it cannot be that drastic. All I know is that Tracy will be back." Kerrigan took maternity leave from Brookside and Tracy was written out temporarily. In October 1991, a journalist from the Sandwell Evening Mail reported that Kerrigan was expected to return to Brookside the following year. Kerrigan also had a "disciplined pregnancy" because she wanted to look good for her character's return. Kerrigan did return and one of Tracy's new stories included a tryst with Peter Harrison (Robert Beck). Writers also gave closure to her romance story with Barry. When Fran Pearson (Julie Peasgood) announces her pregnancy, Barry is exposed as a "love rat". His love interests Tracy, Fran and Angela Lambert (Hilary Welles) all turn against him.

In May 1992, it was announced that Producers decided to permanently write Tracy out of Brookside. A report in the Liverpool Echo revealed that producers decided Tracy could not be "developed any further." The news upset Kerrigan and the lack of any prominent departure storyline given by writers confused her. Kerrigan told Jacobson that "when Tracy was written out, I was honestly very shocked. I thought - "Oh, ok, what now?' I did, kind of build myself up to have my own exit story, which sadly never came. I really don't know why? It was a given that any long-term character would be given an exit story, but she wasn't, so I was a bit bereft for a while. It just ended." Her departure story was broadcast in November 1992. It featured Tracy agreeing to manage Brian Kennedy's (Jonathan Caplan) hair salon in Chester. Tracy was still running the salon in 1994.

Kerrigan later reprised the role and Tracy's brief return was broadcast on 4 January 2003. The story featured Tracy visiting her uncle, Jimmy Corkhill (Dean Sullivan), informing him she has applied for a hairdressing job at the local salon. Jimmy's friend, Nikki Shadwick (Suzanne Collins) is annoyed to discover her critically ill sister Emily O'Leary's (Jennifer Ellison) job is being advertised.

== Reception ==
Tracy became known for her brash attitude and controversial storylines and television critics noticed. In her early years her teenage angst garnered her various labels. The Liverpool Echo's Roy West branded Tracy the show's "trendy" and "problem teenager". A fellow Liverpool Echo journalist branded her the soap opera's "teenage tearaway". The Daily Mirror's Purnell called Tracy a "cheesed off" and "troubled teenager". A Scunthorpe Telegraph writer labelled her a "dour, restless teenage hairdresser." Pauline Cronin writing for Sunday World branded Tracy a "moaning Minnie" and a "scowling hairdresser who thinks she could train Vidal Sassoon". Author Geoff Tibballs assessed Tracy's bad attitude. He wrote that "you always got the feeling with Tracy that she was likely to slip concentrated acid into the perming lotion if it was a customer she didn't like." TV Guide's Fisher branded Tracy as the "petulant Corkhill" and "sulky Tracy" who has "up-front brashness". Tony Pratt from Daily Mirror was thought Billy's negative attitude towards Tracy and Barry's relationship "strange" because he thought Billy would be "pleased about keeping it all in the family."

Kerrigan's seven-year journey as Tracy allowed for extensive character development. In his book, The Who's Who of Soap Operas, Anthony Hayward wrote "knowing her mind and seeking independence, Tracy Corkhill fought back from a string of personal tragedies to start her own mobile hairdressing business." He added that the character appeared unaware that she "seemed to invite trouble". Nerys Lloyd-Pierce and Mike Smith from the Western Mail assessed that Tracy "had the guts" to fight sexual harassment and "blossomed into a mature and sophisticated young woman." Kieran Fagan of the Irish Independent opined that Tracy had become an "unlovely but ever so believable" character.

Her tenure also served as a chance for the unexperienced actress to improve her abilities. Andrew Knight from the Evening Express praised Kerrigan stating she "has won many plaudits for her performance as the tempestuous Tracy Corkhill." Television critic Hilary Kingsley assessed that during Tracy's abortion story, Kerrigan had become a "much improved" actress. Kingsley also praised 1989 scenes featuring Kerrigan, McArdle and Fitzgerald for the "terrific acting" and "best of the week". She added that Tracy played the role of the "sulky, stranglable daughter".
