= Corkhill =

Corkhill is a surname. Notable people with the surname include:

- Fictional family in the Channel 4 soap opera Brookside
  - Billy Corkhill
  - Diana Corkhill
  - Don Corkhill
  - Doreen Corkhill
  - Jackie Corkhill
  - Jimmy Corkhill
  - Lindsey Corkhill
  - Little Jimmy Corkhill
  - Rod Corkhill
  - Sheila Corkhill
  - Tracy Corkhill
  - William Corkhill
- Bill Corkhill (1910–1978), Northern Irish footballer
- Emma Kate Corkhill (1866–1913), American educator
- George B. Corkhill (1838–1886), American lawyer
- Pearl Corkhill (1887–1985), Australian nurse
- Pop Corkhill (1858–1921), American sportsman

== See also ==
- Corker Hill
- Corkerhill
- Corkill
