= Sheila Grant =

Fictional character from the Channel 4 soap opera Brookside

- Brookside character
- Portrayed by: Sue Johnston
- Duration: 1982–1990
- First appearance: 2 November 1982
- Last appearance: 21 September 1990
- Created by: Phil Redmond
- Spin-off appearances: The Lost Weekend (1997); Friday the 13th (1998)
- Crossover appearances: Hollyoaks (2025)
In-universe information
- Other names: Sheila Corkhill; Queen; She
- Occupation: Shop assistant; Cleaner; Barmaid; Dinnerlady; Teaching assistant; School secretary; Florist
- Sisters: Claire; Margaret Jefferson
- Husband: Bobby Grant (until 1989); Billy Corkhill (1990–present)
- Sons: Barry Grant; Damon Grant
- Daughters: Karen Grant; Claire Grant
- Stepsons: Rod Corkhill
- Stepdaughters: Tracy Corkhill
- Grandsons: Simon McGrath; Stephen Pearson
- Uncles: Russell
- Aunts: Jean; Irene
- Nephews: Matthew Jefferson
- Nieces: Helen Jefferson

Sheila Corkhill (also Grant) is a fictional character from British soap opera Brookside, played by Sue Johnston. Sheila is one of Brookside's original characters and appeared from the first episode broadcast on 2 November 1982. She remained on-screen until the character's departure on 21 September 1990. Her most notable storyline was in 1986, when the character was attacked and raped by a taxi driver. Johnston reprised the role of Sheila for the Brookside spin-offs, The Lost Weekend in 1997 and Friday the 13th in 1998. Johnston returned as Sheila in a 2025 Brookside and Hollyoaks crossover episode, as part of the latter shows's 30th anniversary.

== Development ==
The Grant family consisted of Sheila, her husband Bobby (Ricky Tomlinson) and their children Barry (Paul Usher), Karen (Shelagh O'Hara) and Damon (Simon O'Brien). The Grants appeared in the first episode. In the scripts, Sheila was given the two nicknames of "Queen" and "She", which Bobby often refers to her as during scenes.

Writers planned a later-in-life pregnancy storyline for Sheila which captivated viewers' imaginations. The show initially received letters from viewers who mistakenly believed Sheila had cancer because of subtleties added into scripts which portrayed Sheila as being tired. Show creator, Phil Redmond told Roy West from Liverpool Echo that Sheila's pregnancy was only hinted at to begin with and he believed that leaving things unsaid on-screen helped drive their viewers' imaginations. He added "this is what all the good drama does."

In 1986, the most notable storyline featuring Sheila's rape was broadcast. The story was written in order to keep Sue Johnston on the soap, who had previously expressed an interest in leaving.

In the book, "Phil Redmond's Brookside - Life in the Close" it details the lives of former Brookside characters away from the main series. In Sheila and Billy's story, it details them in 1994, still living in Basingstoke where Sheila worked as a part-time school secretary. She and Billy have relationship problems because of rumours about Billy having an affair with a woman whose house he was re-wiring.

On 23 August 2025, it was announced that Johnston had reprised her role for a Brookside and Hollyoaks crossover episode as part of latter's 30th Anniversary. Of her return, Johnston stated "it'll be so lovely to go back and be Sheila for a day as it was such big, enjoyable part of my life."

== Storylines ==
After Bobby had spent his first months of Brookside Close fighting to save his job and 200 others at Fairbanks Engineering, Sheila is the one made redundant in 1983. In an attempt to occupy herself she joined Annabelle Collins' (Doreen Sloane) Ratepayers Association and forged an unlikely friendship with her. The two however disagree when Sheila nominated Roger Huntington (Rob Spendlove) as chairman instead of Annabelle and when they clash over what type of group it should be with Annabelle wanting it to be an apolitical group bringing issues such as hedges and refuse collection to the attention of the council while Sheila wanted to use it to campaign about the poor standard of schooling in the area and the lack of jobs for their children. Later, in an attempt to make a living, Sheila establishes a non-registered employment agency. This has the unfortunate result of having friend Matty Nolan (Tony Scoggo) prosecuted for benefit fraud.

In 1984, Sheila became pregnant with her and Bobby's fourth child, despite both of them being well over 40. Their daughter Claire (Amy Lynch) was born on 8 January 1985 - the very first baby to be born in the series, more than two years after its inception. However, the downside to this was that parenthood so late in life put pressure on the Grants' marriage.

In 1986, Sheila was raped after getting out of a taxi. Following her ordeal she bathed, removing any evidence that could have incriminated her attacker. There were three suspects: former friend Matty Nolan, who was furious with her for wrecking his marriage by telling his wife he had been having an affair; neighbour Pat Hancock (David Easter), who had gotten drunk after a violent argument with his girlfriend and couldn't remember what he'd been up to; and lecturer Alun Jones (Norman Eshley), who had unsuccessfully tried to initiate an affair. However it soon emerged that none of them were guilty, and the rape had been committed by the taxi driver who had just dropped Sheila off. Sheila later discovered she was pregnant as a result of the rape but had a miscarriage.

The Grant family started to break up from 1986, first with Karen leaving to go to university in London. In 1987, Damon was stabbed and died on Lendal Bridge in York. Bobby and Sheila persuaded Barry not to go after revenge, but the strain this put on her caused a rift in her marriage. To try and recuperate, Sheila and Bobby leave for a stay with Sheila's sister Margaret Jefferson (Barbara Marten) and her husband Tony (Richard Walker), but to no avail, and the marriage continued to collapse. After months of tension between him and Sheila, Bobby left her (and the series) in 1988, as a result Bobby decided to sell the house, it was later bought by Frank Rogers (Peter Christian). Sheila is devastated by this, as the home represents everything she and Bobby had worked for. Barry lived in a Volkswagen camper van while Sheila, after briefly living in a grim bedsit flat with Claire, moved back to the Close into friend Billy Corkhill's (John McArdle) house with Claire.

Sheila spends Christmas 1988 with Billy, who was himself now separated, and the two get on well. Later when Debbie McGrath (Gillian Kearney) comes around with Simon, Sheila's grandson, Sheila, Billy and Debbie take him to the park and Sheila and Billy grow closer. On Christmas evening, Billy gives Sheila a present, some rosary beads which he had bought from the Cathedral, knowing how important her Catholic religion was to her. Billy also buys a set for Claire.

Sheila goes to talk to a priest about her failed marriage with Bobby, her home repossession, and meeting Debbie (whom she refers to as Damon's wife) and her grandson Simon. She does not mention Billy to him, although infers his presence. That night Sheila goes missing from Billy's house and he finds her having broken into her boarded up old home, sitting in Damon's old room remembering him and the happy times she had had in that house.

Feeling she is still married to Bobby in the eyes of the church and her growing relationship with Billy is sinful, Sheila insists in leaving, although Billy tells her that his home is her home and tells her she is more than welcome. Nonetheless, Sheila is intent on leaving. On New Year's Eve, however, Sheila slips out of a party early to be with Claire. Billy follows her and the two kiss, starting a relationship. Despite an attempt by Billy's estranged wife Doreen to derail their blossoming relationship in 1989, Sheila and Billy eventually marry in September 1990 and leave Brookside to live in Basingstoke, Hampshire with Sheila's sister Margaret, eventually selling No.10 to Billy's son Rod (Jason Hope) and his wife Diana (Paula Frances).

Sheila returned, without Billy, in the straight-to-video special The Lost Weekend in 1997, when her sister-in-law Jackie Corkhill (Sue Jenkins) begs her to return and persuade Barry to save Lindsey Corkhill (Claire Sweeney) from a group of gangsters holding her hostage. She returned again the following year in another straight-to-video special, Friday the 13th, to attend Lindsey's wedding to Peter Phelan (Samuel Kane). She became caught up in trouble when Jimmy (Dean Sullivan) is pursued by drug-dealers intent on killing him. At the wedding itself, Sheila tells Jackie that she has only managed to attend because she came home early from her stepdaughter Tracy's (Justine Kerrigan) wedding in Australia, after an argument with Billy caused by his ex-wife Doreen (Kate Fitzgerald). She eventually leaves the wedding, before the main ceremony, to meet Billy at their home after he arranged to send her flowers (from Sheila's own florists' shop). In 2001, Jimmy mentioned that Billy and Sheila were "still together" in a conversation with neighbour Diane Murray (Bernie Nolan).

In October 2025, as seen in the crossover episode of Hollyoaks, Sheila was back living in no. 5 Brookside Close with Billy, her old house where she originally lived with ex-husband Bobby in the 1980s. She was still in contact with Bobby and it was hinted that they recently had a fling.

== Reception ==
For her performance as Sheila, Johnston was considered for a BAFTA at the British Academy Television Awards and made it to a shortlist of forty actresses. The character was selected as one of the "top 100 British soap characters" by industry experts for a poll to be run by What's on TV, with readers able to vote for their favourite character to discover "Who is Soap's greatest Legend?" A writer for Inside Soap branded the character "St Sheila" and said she "endured tragedy after tragedy". They praised Johnston's performance in the wake of Sheila's rape, calling it "the soap's greatest moment." Paul Brooks from Soaplife included Sheila and Billy in his list of "dream lovers". He assessed that love grew in an unlikely couple: Sheila "a devout Catholic" and Billy "a reformed scally" who committed electricity bill fraud. In March 2000, Sheila was inducted into All About Soap's "soap hall of fame" and she was branded a "downtrodden but loveable mum" and a "bright woman, who wanted to better herself" via her education. Their writer added "it's no wonder" that Sheila "sounds a bit grim" given her range of storylines given to her over nine years. They believed that Sheila and Billy are "one of the soap's best-loved couples" who made one of Brookside's "most heart-warming" storylines. Francesca Babb from the magazine included Sheila's rape in their "most memorable moments" of Brookside feature. She branded it "gripping stuff" and noted "an army of soap fans were stunned" by the "horrific rape" of the "Close's matriarch".

Bronwen Balmforth from Titbits described Sheila as a "forceful forty-plus" character, who was portrayed as "ambition fulfilled" by moving into from a council estate to Brookside Close. Balmforth added that "Sheila's feuds and friendships with the neighbours make lively viewing." A reporter from Sunday Magazine listed Johnston second in a list of ten of "Brookside's biggest stars". They included her rape storyline fourth in a list of ten of "Brookside's biggest moments". They also branded Sheila a "devout Catholic" and "middle-aged mum" character. Johnny Dee from Record Mirror listed Sheila in fourth place on a list of Brookside's "top ten goodies". He described one of number 5 Brookside Close's most "memorable moments" as Sheila and Kathy returning from the disco with two men. He added that Sheila and Billy's kiss was one of number 10's most memorable stories, adding it showed "true lurve comes out of tragedy."
