= Julia Brogan =

Fictional character from the Channel 4 soap opera Brookside

- Brookside character
- Portrayed by: Gladys Ambrose
- Duration: 1985–1998
- First appearance: 24 September 1985
- Last appearance: 10 June 1998
- Created by: Phil Redmond
In-universe information
- Occupation: Shop assistant Cleaner
- Brothers: Tom
- Husband: Albert Brogan (backstory)
- Daughters: Doreen Corkhill
- Grandsons: Rod Corkhill
- Granddaughters: Tracy Corkhill

Julia Brogan is a fictional character from the British Channel 4 soap opera Brookside, played by Gladys Ambrose. The character debuted on-screen during the episode broadcast on 24 September 1985. Julia was introduced as part of a new family, the Corkhills, and is the mother of Doreen Corkhill (Kate Fitzgerald) and grandmother of Tracy Corkhill (Justine Kerrigan) and Rod Corkhill (Jason Hope). Writers quickly made her the interfering mother-in-law to Doreen's husband, Billy Corkhill (John McArdle). Ambrose was originally hired to appear in only eight episodes of Brookside but she was continually invited back to portray further storylines. Ambrose wanted to become a regular cast member and her role within the show was expanded in the early 1990s. Julia is characterised as outrageous, interfering and a local gossip. Ambrose has described Julia as brash but kind-hearted with a well-turned-out dress sense despite her working class backstory. Ambrose also based Julia's personality on that of her own grandmother. She is often used in comedic storylines which her characterisation plays into. Julia is infamous for mispronouncing words and writers bestowed various comical malapropisms into Julia's dialogue. She is also known for her various catchphrases when entering a scene and the sound of her stilettos clattering on the floor. Brookside producer Mal Young wanted to utilise Julia and portray a positive representation of old age characters. Julia outlasted her entire original on-screen family who had all departed by 1993 but writers continued creating storylines for her.

Julia's early storylines involved interfering in the Corkhill's lives and her friendships with Ralph Hardwick (Ray Dunbobbin) and Harry Cross (Bill Dean). Julia has been featured in relationship storylines with Cyril Dixon (Allan Surtees) and Jack Sullivan (William Maxwell) and both ended in heart-break for the character. Julia's romance with Cyril was marred by the reveal of his past promiscuity and he dies from a heart-attack. Ambrose believed Julia's relationship with Jack was supposed to be her final chance of happiness that was eventually ruined by Jack revealing he is still married and a murderer. Her friendship with David Crosbie (John Burgess) was another focal point for writers. They developed a plot in which the two take up ballroom dancing and enter competitions. Ambrose and Burgess took two-months of professional dance classes to portray the storyline realistically. Off-screen they too won competitions for the Allied Dancing Association. In 1994, Ambrose was diagnosed with bowel cancer and took most of the year off to recover. She returned to filming that year and was made a regular cast member in July 1996.

Julia has been well received by television critics and book authors who favoured her "Scouse attitude" and brash persona. She was documented as being one of the show's most recognisable characters and a "battle-axe" and "busybody" of the soap opera genre. Her malapropisms gained the nickname "Juliaisms" and her comedy was welcomed by reviewers for giving viewers respite from the show's bleak storylines. Ambrose's portrayal of Julia gained her nominations for "Funniest Character" at the 1998 Inside Soap Awards and "Best Comedy Performance" at the 1999 British Soap Awards.

== Casting ==
Ambrose joined the cast in 1985 and viewed it as her breakout role. She told Ken Irwin from Daily Mirror that "after years of struggling I've finally been discovered" and revealed that "Julia is a merry widow and she has opened up a whole new world for me." Ambrose was originally contracted to appear as Julia in eight episodes but this was later continually extended.

== Development ==
=== Characterisation and malapropisms ===
Ambrose made her first on-screen appearance as Julia during the episode broadcast on 24 September 1985. Julia's introduction storyline features her coming to live with her daughter, Doreen Corkhill (Kate Fitzgerald) and family after her electricity supply is cut off. Doreen's husband, Billy Corkhill (John McArdle) is not happy with her moving in. Julia shares a room with her granddaughter, Tracy Corkhill (Justine Kerrigan) who does not mind her presence. Writers quickly established Julia as a gossiping character as she immediately begins to share her family history with Ralph Hardwick (Ray Dunbobbin).

In her backstory, production detailed that Julia was married to Arthur Brogan and he fathered their daughter but she later became widowed. Julia had aspirations of becoming a singer when she was young, but becoming pregnant with Doreen prevented her from fulfilling her dreams. Julia often interferes in Doreen's life and resents her for marrying into the Corkhill family. Writers continued to explore Julia's interfering ways after Doreen's departure and she continues to visit her grandchildren. In her early years on the soap, Julia works at a local grocery shop and hairdressers. In her later years she is employed at Ron Dixon's (Vince Earl) shop, The Trading Post. In the book, "Brookside: The Official Companion", Julia is described as an "outrageous character" and that Ambrose "enjoys playing her as a figure of fun." Writers portrayed Julia as being aware of the local gossip in her community, despite not always knowing the full story, which does not phase her.

"Just as the city centre has CCTV, Brookside Close has Julia Brogan. Able to hone in [sic] on gossip faster than a tabloid journalist and with a surveillance technique which makes MI5 look amateurish, Julia is the eyes and ears of the Close."

— Author Geoff Tibballs discussing Julia's busybody characterisation. (1998)

Ambrose based much of Julia's characterisation on her grandmother. Julia's sayings such as "now get in there, Lady Godiva" and "spare me!" were borrowed from her grandmother. Ambrose revealed they were her grandmother's favourite catchphrases. She recalled that when she was a child, her grandmother would often sing the song, "Nellie Dean". When writers required Ambrose to sing in scenes featuring Julia to sing in a club, she decided that Julia too should sing "Nellie Dean". Julia's interfering ways can alienate some. Ambrose defended Julia in the book, "Brookside - The First Ten Years". She told author Geoff Tibballs that "I love Julia, I know she speaks before she thinks but she's the salt of the earth and she'll always turn up trumps when someone's in trouble. She's the sort that would bring them into the world and lay them out when they're dead." She is written as a kind hearted character who is keen will help other characters. Another recognisable character trait is Julia's love of boiled sweets. In 1986, Ambrose told a reporter from Herald Express that she is different to Julia. She labelled her character as "working class, brash but always well turned-out." Ambrose viewed it as "a nice touch" for the character because it showcased that those without money do not need to look "scruffy". She added Julia was "a lovely character" to portray because "she says and does all the things I would never dare do." In 1987, Ambrose told a Liverpool Echo reporter that she loved playing Julia because she is "flamboyant" and "an awful flirt". In 1989, Ambrose spoke about her surprise that viewers across responded so well to Julia's characterisation. She noted that "they love the way she is a real battle-axe." Another characteristic of Julia is her loud "clip-clopping" sound her shoes make and her "spare me" catchphrase.

Brookside producer Mal Young revealed that the show wanted to portray a positive representation of old age via Julia. He told Tibballs ("The Brookside Files") that both Ambrose and Julia have a "tremendous energy" that is fully utilised in her characterisation. He noted that Julia goes against the normal portrayals of an older aged character without exploring "senility, bed-wetting and going to funerals." He explained that "a lot of retired people have a great time" and "Julia is a very positive character". Writers sometimes explored Julia's serious side which they did via her reaction to Diana Corkhill (Paula Frances) being raped. Young also liked Julia because she is a unique character who interacts with all the characters featured in the series. This offered a better range of character interactions for the writing of Julia. Young explained that "she's one of those rare characters who can go into anyone's shop or house. Some people will only knock on certain people's doors but Julia can go everywhere - not even to buy anything, just to talk."

Another part of Julia's characterisation is her muddled speech and scripts contained various malapropisms that Julia says. One of her most recognisable is mispronouncing Max (Steven Pinder) and Susannah Farnham's (Karen Drury) surname in a double-barrel format as "Farn-Ham". When Julia references Beth Jordache's (Anna Friel) lesbianism, she crowed "I've seen 'er type before, she's one of them Lebanese." Another example is when Ron accuses Julia of stealing from the shop till, unaware his son Mike Dixon (Paul Byatt) is the culprit. Ron later apologises to Julia but she incorrectly accuses him of "defecation of character". Ambrose stated that the storyline gained a good reaction from viewers based on her fan mail. She also recalled that when she went shopping, people would make jokes about protecting the till from Julia. Ambrose recalled that viewers would approach her in the street and do impressions of Julia. Young organised a special video feature for the 1996 Q Awards which featured a Julia malapropism. In the video, Julia and Sinbad (Michael Starke) argue about an issue of Q magazine out the Trading Post. Julia references singer Liam Gallagher but mistakenly calls him "that Liam Galahad fella".

=== Early story development ===
In March 1986, Ambrose took part in location filming in Torquay. In the show, Julia and the fellow older characters, Ralph, Harry Cross (Bill Dean), and Madge Richmond (Shirley Stelfox) go on holiday together. Dean was approached by a news reporter during filming on Torquay seafront but refused to reveal story specifics. He added "we're not letting on who ends up with who, lets just say we're all having a lovely time." Stelfox revealed that it was cold weather during filming and the cast were wrapped in blankets in-between filming scenes. In one scene, Julia and Madge go swimming. When Ambrose and Stelfox filmed the scenes, Ambrose accidentally kicked Stelfox and disjointed her pelvis. When the story was broadcast during April 1986, it was revealed that Harry, Ralph and Madge go on holiday together but Julia later turns up and gate-crashes their getaway. Madge and Ralph reminisce about the war which forces Julia and Harry to go off together.

In the 1980s, Ambrose appeared as Julia on a recurring basis but she wanted to become a regular cast member. In 1989, Ambrose returned to filming as Julia for another guest stint. Julia then had a several month absence from storylines and in January 1990, Ambrose reaffirmed her desire to appear as Julia more frequently. Ambrose returned to filming in May 1990. Ambrose revealed that viewers had been enquiring when she would return again because they liked her role as a "nosey mother-in-law". In 1991, writers began to expand the character and make her a more integral part of the show. Ambrose had to limit her theatre commitments to accommodate the character. She told a reporter from Perthshire Advertiser that she was happy with how writers had developed Julia. She added "the writers have been very kind to me, I love every line I have to utter." Producer Mal Young had wanted Julia's full-time return to help rebalance the show's direction following numerous storylines focusing on younger characters.

That year, writers created a relationship storyline between Julia and Ron's father, Cyril Dixon (Allan Surtees). He is portrayed as a "rogue" type character and gives Julia a difficult time during their romance. As the plot develops, Julia discovers information about Cyril's past and believes he is a womaniser. His frequent travels suggest he had multiple woman he was romancing in different locations and Julia becomes suspicious of him. Ambrose revealed that she had an admiration for Cyril's characterisation and believed "the average woman" are attracted to men like him, "who live dangerously and keep their lover on their toes." Ambrose told a Derry Journal reporter that "Cyril doesn't see deception in love as anything really wrong; he feels he's helping Julia, spicing up the woman's mundane life with a little mature romance. He has secrets from her, but she's convinced he'll treat her as someone a bit more special than the rest." They become engaged but Cyril fails to attend their engagement party. Cyril is exposed as a triple bigamist and dies from a heart attack. Ambrose believed that Julia's resilience in getting over Cyril proved that she is "a great survivor". She told Tibballs that Julia "was devastated about Cyril, but she'll always pick herself up, dust herself down and start all over again."

In another storyline, Julia is mugged and writers explored her recovery in subsequent episodes. Julia's grandson, Rod Corkhill (Jason Hope) and his housemate, Tommo (John O'Gorman) discuss the possibility of Julia moving in with them while she recovers. Young told Tibballs that they do not want Julia moving in with them. He added that post-production edited in voice over of Ambrose singing to add to add comedy to the scene, as Rod and Tommo clearly want her out of the house. Julia had remained in the series despite the eventual departures of her immediate family: Doreen, Billy, Tracy and Rod.

=== Ballroom dancing, absence and promotion ===
Writers also developed a friendship between Julia and David Crosbie (John Burgess). They soon developed a ballroom dance competition storyline for the two to compete in, which was announced in May 1993. Ambrose and Burgess undertook two months of dance classes at the Billy Martin Dance School, beginning in March 1993. They were trained by John and Sue Martin from the academy and the latter revealed to a Liverpool Echo reporter that the actors both worked hard and began performing well. The actors also announced their intention to compete and attempt to win a bronze medal at a competition from the Allied Dancing Association. In turn, Brookside supported the Liverpool team entrants of the Come Dancing from Bournemouth competition with publicity from the show's set. The storyline began playing out on-screen during July 1993 episodes and Julia begins collecting sponsor money for their efforts. They plan to try and win ballroom honours at a dance competition at a holiday camp. Ambrose revealed she had no ballroom dancing experience but had always wanted to learn. She explained that as Julia and David improved on-screen, so must they to make their story appear convincing. This meant their skillset always needed to be more advanced than their characters as they continued to film their scenes.

Ambrose also noted it was not supposed to be a romance storyline because David is married to Jean Crosbie (Marcia Ashton). She likened Julia and David to a "pair of harmless old flirts" but Julia is not trying to snare him from Jean. Ambrose was wary about Julia's view on her friendship with David, revealing she sees their rapport as "something deeper and more loving than he does." David sees it as solely a dance partnership but Julia likes having a male friend in her life again. Ambrose concluded that Jean is unbothered by Julia spending time with David and only worries when he spends time with younger women. By October 1993, Ambrose and Burgess had won silver and bronze medals at Allied Dancing Association competitions. On-screen their dancing fared less rewarding.

In February 1994, it was announced that Ambrose had been diagnosed with bowel cancer and had surgery to remove the tumour. Ambrose worried because producers had created a prominent storyline for Julia and was expected to film the story for four months. Doctors told Ambrose treatment could not wait and Ambrose had to inform producers. In May 1994, Ambrose thanked Brookside viewers for their support, cards and flowers during her illness. Julia was written out of the series temporarily but Ambrose confirmed that wanted to return to filming as soon as possible. She continued to receive cancer treatment throughout the year until she recovered. Her doctors told her she was well enough to return to Brookside in October 1994. She returned to filming in November 1994. Her return as Julia resumed from episodes broadcast from 2 December 1994. Julia had been written out of the show in a mystery storyline. When she returns, other residents discover her reason for leaving. In her return, David invites Julia to appear in a Christmas panto playing an ugly sister role.

Writers later transformed Julia into a house cleaner and is employed by the Farnhams. Young revealed that Julia would become Susannah's "confidante", adding "I'm sure that Julia will cause even more sparks to fly around the Farnham household." When in their presence Julia becomes pretentious and puts on her finest airs and graces. In July 1996, producers promoted Ambrose to the show's regular cast and gave her first one-year contract. One month into the contract, Ambrose's husband died. She later revealed that the timing of guaranteed work had saved her from her grief.

=== Jack Sullivan and departure ===
Writers created Julia's next relationship with Jack Sullivan (William Maxwell), who is father to Terry Sullivan (Brian Regan). Their relationship progresses into a potential wedding story and they have their engagement party at the Grants restaurant. Ambrose believed that Julia originally only sought a friendship with Jack "but then she got smitten". In February 1997, Julia discovers that Jack is still married to Mary (Sally Treble) and caused the death of her former lover. Julia is upset by the revelation and Ambrose told Angela Hagan from Daily Mirror that "Julia really thought her life was settled and she and Jack would end their days together." She added that Julia spent a lot of money on their wedding but it has "all gone up in smoke". Jack had claimed that his wife was dead. Ambrose told Liverpool Echo's Peter Grant that Julia is "absolutely heart-broken and devastated" by Jack's deception. She believed he was the person who would provide her with company again at home. She added "she and Jack would go out together and cuddle up indoors having cosy chats - but all this has been taken away from her." Ambrose believed Julia wanted to marry Jack out of desperation. Maxwell defended Jack's behaviour and believed he was not a nasty character. He told Liverpool Echo's Felicity Newson that Jack is a "loveable rogue" who behaved "very irresponsibly". He added that Jack accidentally killed the man and kept it a secret for more than thirty years. Maxwell explained that Jack genuinely loves Julia but could not be honest with her. He added that Jack has "been very generous towards her - it's just unfortunate that he hasn't disentangled himself from his previous marriage."

Ambrose made her final appearance as Julia during the episode broadcast on 10 June 1998. Julia's final storyline was long-running and explored her learning to drive. Her final scenes featured her failing her driving test in a comic scene. Ambrose filmed the scenes the day before she had an operation. It was announced that Ambrose had been diagnosed with lung cancer but was recovering in hospital. A show publicist revealed that writers intended on keeping Julia a part of the show's storyline. Ambrose died on 4 July 1998 from cancer. Executive producer Phil Redmond stated "everyone here at Mersey Television feels the great loss of one of life's vibrant spirits, our thoughts are with Gladys' family and loved ones she has left behind. We will miss her greatly." Writers concluded Julia's story by having her visit Australia and finding romance with a flying doctor. The characters of Max and Susannah discuss Julia's new romance in a September 1998 episode.

== Reception ==
"She was the light amid the gloom. The comic gem who stopped us Brookside devotees reaching for razor blades when the storylines got so bleak you didn't much see the point in carrying on. When husbands were put under patios, men murdered their best mate's girl, when incest was uncovered, euthanasia went on trial or breast cancer diagnosed, there was always that little old woman pulling a Les Dawson face, sucking a mint imperial and expressing disgust in sentences that always ended in a malapropism. Or a Julia-ism as they called them at Brookside."

— Daily Mirror journalist Brian Reade discussing Julia. (1998)

Ambrose's portrayal of Julia gained her a nomination for the "Funniest Character" accolade at the 1998 Inside Soap Awards. Ambrose was nominated for "Best Comedy Performance" at the 1999 British Soap Awards.

Brian Reade from Daily Mirror branded the character a "comic gem" and "the light amid the gloom". He believed Ambrose made a "marvellous creation" in Julia and that she was "Brookside's Hilda Ogden", a "working-class snob who always tried to better herself. But always failed abysmally." Reade assessed that Julia failed mostly in her love life as she "lost her heart to every varicose-veined conman" featured in the show and remained a widow throughout her tenure. Reade believed "it was a status she would play on to gain invites to people's houses, then rifle their drawers for fragments of juicy gossip." Reade added that Ambrose prided herself on looking classy but noted Julia still had "the language of a commoner".

In his book, "The Who's Who of Soap Operas", Anthony Hayward branded Julia as Doreen's "interfering mother". He believed that via her job roles, she was portrayed as "generally making her presence felt". Author Geoff Tibballs wrote that "to the uninitiated, Julia seems an interfering busybody whose ideal form of transport would be a broomstick." In another profile, Tibballs opined that Julia is "Brookside's resident busybody. She knows everyone on the Close and is not afraid to air her views on their behaviour. Some people think she's an interfering old witch; others aren't sure about her age." In the book, "Total Brookside: The Ultimate Guide to the Ultimate Soap", Tibballs discussed her malapropisms stating, "she is as comfortable with the English language as Little Miss Muffet would be in the insect house at London Zoo and trots out malapropisms as often as other people use verbs." He concluded that Julia is "never backward" in giving other characters her opinion and quipped she "has dished out more advice than Claire Rayner." In the book "Real Soap: Brookside", author Kay Nicholls praised her as an unforgettable character, stating "and then, of course, there were the relatives that came to stay and never left. Who could forget the fabulous Choolia Brogan who moved into number 10 when she got fined for 'fiddling her leccy'?"

Larry Neild from Liverpool Echo branded Julia a "battle-axe" and "Brookside's champion nosey-parker". Another reviewed that she is a "battling gran" and "the Scouse with the mouth" who constantly gives Billy "a rough ride". She has also been called "the mother-in-law Merseysiders love to hate." Harry Dean added that Julia is a "man-chasing" and "big-hearted" character. Their colleague Judith Moss assessed that Ambrose gained a considerable following via the character's "outspoken scouse attitude to life". She added that Julia is "the uncompromising mum-in-law with the heart of gold" who became "a big hit with viewers around the country" and fans adored Julia's outlook on life. Di Pulson and Paddy Shennan wrote that Julia is a "loudmouth" who "is always on the look out for romance". Peter Grant concluded that the character "gave Brookside much-needed laughter", later adding Ambrose made "interfering gossip monger" Julia "a favourite with the soap's six million fansfor more than 13 years." Joe Riley added Julia is "gossip-mongering" but also "scatty and prone to get her words mixed up."

A writer from The Weekly News branded Julia a "domineering mother". A Runcorn Weekly News columnist named her Billy's "larger than life mother-in-law" and a Widnes Weekly News reporter labelled her "the Corkhill's busybody gran". Sunderland Echo's John Gelson reviewed that Julia is "brassy, she's sassy, but she's got a heart of gold. She's Julia Brogan, Brookside's number one gossip and a real favourite with the viewers." A writer from Inside Soap assessed that Ambrose was "loved by millions as Brookside's Julia Brogan." Jayne Dodgson writing for Winsford Chronicle branded her as "one of Brookside's favourite characters" and "everyone's favourite scouse granny", adding that Ambrose's portrayal "has won the hearts of millions". A Bristol Evening Post critic believed Julia assumed the role of "Brookside's most spritely senior citizen". Their co-worker, Tim Davey assessed that via the Jack storyline, "lusty pensioner Julia Brogan is seeing her once sleepy life transformed from a Mills and Boon pot-boiler to a tale of murder and intrigue." Davey added that Julia became the "cul-de-sac's queen of tittle-tattle." George Dodds from Middleton Guardian called Julia a "zany fusspot" type of character.

After Ambrose's death, Kathy Griffiths from South Wales Daily Post mourned Julia stating "how will we cope without her malapropisms which could raise a smile when houses were besieged and drug dealers peddled their wears around her." The critic recalled her favourite Julia malapropism was "that milk of magnesium does wonders for my dyslexia" and that Julia "secured her place in soap heaven" for the line alone. A Daily Record columnist and Caroline Sigley from Liverpool Daily Post hailed her as "Britain's best-loved busybody". Sigley added that Ambrose "was loved by many" for her portrayal of Julia. She stated that clattering stilettos and her "cooey" catchphrase "resonated around Brookside Close" and concluded that "her Juliaisms set the whole nation laughing." The Lincolnshire Echo's Mark Charlton assessed that she is "Brookside's number one nosey parker" and "the humour she has brought to the close will be sadly missed."

Tony Barrow writing for The Stage branded the character as "Brookside's awful Julia Brogan". In December 1990, Angus Towler from the publication criticised Brookside for failing to "exploit characters with real comic potential". He noted Julia was the prime example and they failed due to her "all-too infrequent appearances". Vicki Coppock, writing for the radical feminist magazine, Trouble & Strife branded Julia an "incessant judgemental gossip-mongering" character and Brookside's "equivalent of" Coronation Street's Hilda Ogden (Jean Alexander) or EastEnders' Dot Cotton (June Brown).
