= Doreen Corkhill =

Fictional character from the Channel 4 soap opera Brookside

- Brookside character
- Portrayed by: Kate Fitzgerald
- Duration: 1985–1987, 1989–1990
- First appearance: 7 August 1985
- Last appearance: 14 September 1990
- Created by: Phil Redmond
In-universe information
- Occupation: Receptionist
- Father: Albert Brogan
- Mother: Julia Brogan
- Husband: Billy Corkhill (until 1990)
- Sons: Rod Corkhill
- Daughters: Tracy Corkhill
- Uncles: Tom
- Aunts: Joan Brogan

Doreen Corkhill is a fictional character from the British Channel 4 soap opera Brookside, played by Kate Fitzgerald.

Doreen, her husband Billy (John McArdle) and their children Rod (Jason Hope) and Tracy (Justine Kerrigan) were the first incarnation of the Corkhill family, who purchased 10 Brookside Close from Marie Jackson (Anna Keaveney) in September 1985. Although their marriage was initially stable, the Corkhills were plagued by money troubles stemming from Doreen overspending, which was itself motivated by Doreen's middle-class aspirations. The financial pressures forced Billy to turn to crime and Doreen to consider prostituting herself to her employer, dentist David Howman (Michael Roberts), in order to stay afloat. This proved a turning point in their marriage, Doreen walked out on her family in November 1987, when Billy confessed he was involved in a robbery in which a supermarket manager had been stabbed, something he had only agreed to in the hope that his share of money would clear Doreen's debts. Despite scouring the country to find her at first, Billy eventually moved into a relationship with divorced neighbour Sheila Grant (Sue Johnston), and Doreen's return stints in 1989 and 1990 revolved around her failed attempts to split them up and resume her marriage to Billy.

Critical response to Doreen as a character was positive, citing her realism, although some were skeptical about the character's transformation on her return in 1989. Fitzgerald herself regretted Doreen's 1987 exit, feeling that it betrayed the women that Doreen was based upon, but was glad to return for her later guest appearances.

== Casting ==
Fitzgerald secured the role in 1985. John McArdle was hired to play Doreen's husband Billy Corkhill. Justine Kerrigan and Jason Hope were then cast as their children, Tracy and Rod Corkhill. In an interview about his casting, Hope recalled that he had to meet with Fitzgerald and McArdle "to make sure we could pass of as family members." Kerrigan branded Fitzgerald a "brilliant actor" and praised the casting dynamic of the Corkhills. She added "I bonded with Kate straight away and she spoke to me like I was an adult, which I really appreciated. I had never or since – met anyone like her."

== Development ==
=== Characterisation and debts ===
Doreen works as a receptionist at a dentists. She is characterised as "hard-working woman" who has had to "scrimped and saved" to get where she is. She also has a "atmosphere-sensitive sixth sense". In the book Brookside: The Official Companion, Doreen is described as being aware that good houses need tenants with good finances, but "she can't stop dreaming". Billy loves her enough to risk financial ruin by buying her dream house on Brookside Close. Doreen was written to be an aspiring woman at odds with her more reluctant husband, Billy. Writers pitted the characters against the more socialist Grant family. Doreen is a "shopaholic", she strives to keep up with the Collins family and her social aspirations ultimately are her downfall. She is aware that the Corkhills have a "shady" side but tries to present a "good image" to her neighbours.

Writers used Doreen to portray the issues that arise from debts. The Corkhills face financial difficulties after Doreen free spending without thinking of the implications. Billy loses his job and their utilities are cut off and their television gets repossessed. Billy tries to help his family out of debt by tampering with the electricity supply. This causes issues with their son Rod, who is training to be a police officer. Writers continued to develop the story into 1987. Billy's brother, Jimmy Corkhill (Dean Sullivan) convinces him to stage a burglary at his home and steal from the Collins family. This upsets Doreen and she discovers the stolen property and the bank begin repossession proceedings.

The Corkhills struggle with Billy's unemployment and then he becomes angry with his neighbours for driving over his lawn to avoid a hole in the road. Billy retaliates by going on a rampage in his car, driving all over the other front gardens on Brookside Close. McArdle told Graham Kibble-White, the author of 20 Years of Brookside, that his character was reacted badly because his "family were falling down" and he suspected Doreen of having an affair with her dentist. The director of the episode, Ken Horn added that it was a well-remembered Brookside moment and credited its success to Fitzgerald and McArdle's "terrific" acting.

Their debt story culminated in the break-down of their marriage. Billy becomes desperate for money and participates in an armed robbery at a supermarket. Billy helps drive the getaway vehicle but the supermarket manager is injured. Doreen later decides to leave Billy, but keeps his involvement a secret from Rod. Fitzgerald decided to leave the role and her decision left scriptwriters with a dilemma on how to write Doreen out whilst keeping the rest of the Corkhill family in the show. She leaves in November 1987 and in February 1988, Billy travels to Bristol to find Doreen. Fitzgerald chose to leave Brookside because she was exhausted and unhappy with the role. She cited working long hours and issues with Doreen's characterisation in her decision to leave. Doreen and Billy "had been going through fairly painful emotions". Their dramas won Fitzgerald and McArdle praise on a weekly basis from television critics. The negative impact of the emotional drama caused Fitzgerald to swear that she would not portray such "pain and angst" again. Fitzgerald told Anthony Hayward from TVTimes that "I was very, very tired, part of that was, I think, because I'd never played a character for that length of time."

The actress also felt guilty about leaving because she believed that Doreen's absence destroyed the Corkhill family. She noted Doreen was "never going to leave her husband and children" and "I [felt I] had actually let a certain type of woman down." Fitzgerald claimed that she and other actors disliked the Corkhill's backstory because "it was a nonsense in the first place". She explained that Doreen had met Billy at a young age and put all of her energy into her family. For Doreen to then put her family into debt was "out of character", but she praised the writers who "worked hard" to make it believable."

=== Return ===
"When she discovered that Billy had started a relationship with Sheila she decided to fight to get Billy back, removing all of Sheila’s belongings from the house and changing the locks. But in the end, it wasn’t enough and she left the Close again – alone."

— A Brookside.com writer describing Doreen's return. (2002)

Producers asked Fitzgerald to return the following year but she declined. They asked again in 1989 and she accepted because she needed the money they offered her. Fitzgerald told Hayward that she was "absolutely petrified" about returning, but the cast made her feel welcome. She realised that she had good friends at Brookside and that her earlier departure had been a mistake. Doreen's absence helped her overcome her earlier troubles and she returns "refreshed". Fitzgerald explained that "Doreen never had opportunities before because she had put everything into her family. Now she has put energies into other areas of her life. She is supposed to have been living in Bristol." The actress also praised the realism of Doreen's story because she had known women to walk out on their family.

Doreen returns during the episode broadcast on 10 July 1989. Doreen appears with a new look complete with a peroxide-blonde cropped hairstyle, which Fitzgerald had done during her time away. Writers reintroduced Doreen back into the Corkhill household, despite Billy now being in a relationship with Sheila Grant (Sue Johnston). Sheila orders Billy to throw Doreen out, but he refuses. Sheila moves out instead and writers played Doreen creating a plan to resume her marriage. Fitzgerald added "I think you can assume it will be a good bit of drama." Johnston liked Doreen's return because it added conflict for Sheila and Billy's relationship. She told Karen Swayne from Chat magazine that "everyone has been getting a bit nice in the Close. It's got a bit even keel and it needed conflict to give it an edge." Fitzgerald stated that she found the dialogue the two females exchange "rather shocking". Johnston added that Doreen is "very uncompromising" in the way she speaks to Sheila. Doreen accuses Sheila of being desperate and uses her older age as a "weapon" in her bid to snare Billy. Johnston branded Doreen's age discrimination tactic as "very painful because I know exactly how that hurts." She stated it was "absolutely the right thing" Doreen would say because she believed women know exactly how to hurt each other emotionally. Fitzgerald concluded that her return gave fans what they wanted. She revealed that viewers approached her in public and told her that to reunite with Billy and the children because she was "breaking their hearts". She added that she felt "knocked out" by how strongly the show's viewers cared about Doreen's story. In August, Doreen empties the house of Sheila's belongings and changes the locks. She then causes Sheila to break-up with Billy by revealing his part in the supermarket robbery. This forces Billy to tell Doreen he does not love her and Doreen was written out the series once again.

In the book, "Phil Redmond's Brookside - Life in the Close" it details the lives of former Brookside characters away from the main series. In Doreen's story it is revealed that she is still living in Bristol and works in a shoe factory. She still regrets losing Billy and never found anyone to replace him.

== Reception ==
Critics from The Guardian have commented on the stark realism of Doreen's characterisation and stories. Gareth McLean opined that Doreen and Billy were a true reflection of "the aspiring lower-middle-class" living in Liverpool. Shyama Perera wrote that Doreen's debt problems were a common problem faced by many in society. In the book British Television Drama in the 1980s, writers analysed an argument between Doreen and Sheila and compared it with an argument between the Dynasty characters Alexis Colby (Joan Collins) and Krystle Carrington (Linda Evans). Their conclusion was that Brookside's portrayal of women was more realistic than those featured in American soap operas.

Hilary Kingsley, writing for Sunday Mirror believed that the Corkhills were a "semi-comic, semi-tragic" clan with believable characters. She added "don't you just know a nutter like Billy and a silly cow like Doreen?" Matt Wolf from The Sacramento Bee stated that Brookside's characters, such as the Corkhills, represent the British working class and their problems. They added "a typical episode shows the Corkhills behind in their rent. Tracy's job is in the balance, Billy is unemployed and Doreen bets on horses to make ends meet." The Corkhills' house was depicted as the most rundown household on Brookside Close. Author Geoff Tibbals quipped "the natural starting point for any tour of the Close is the Corkhills' house, which, in the days of Doreen and Billy, was the only residence a brick through the window qualified as a home improvement." Lynne St Claire from the Nottingham Post branded Doreen a "wily" character. In the book, To Be Continued... Soap Operas Around the World, Christine Geraghty wrote that Doreen was an example of one of Brookside's early authentic female characters. Geraghty branded Doreen a "strong mother" and assessed that she was someone "who controlled and negotiated family life within the home." She added that the show lacked such female roles during the 1990s. A Liverpool Echo writer branded Doreen a "wonderful woman" who put up with Billy's whining. They added, "I really think it's time she pushed the miserable little berk under a bus."
