= Jackie Corkhill =

Fictional character from Brookside

- Brookside character
- Portrayed by: Sue Jenkins
- Duration: 1991–2001
- First appearance: 19 June 1991
- Last appearance: 14 November 2001
- Created by: Phil Redmond
In-universe information
- Occupation: Shop worker
- Father: William Walker
- Sisters: Val Walker
- Husband: Jimmy Corkhill (until 2001)
- Sons: Little Jimmy Corkhill; William Corkhill
- Daughters: Lindsey Corkhill
- Granddaughters: Kylie Corkhill

Jacqueline "Jackie" Corkhill is a fictional character from the British television soap opera Brookside, played by Sue Jenkins from 1991 to 2001.

== Storylines ==
Jackie was introduced as the long-suffering estranged wife of Jimmy Corkhill (Dean Sullivan) in 1991, even though the character was first mentioned as early as 1986 when Jimmy first appeared; she continued to be mentioned regularly for the next five years. The two became one of the soaps most popular couples.

Although they were estranged when Jimmy first appeared, they got back together in 1991 when she joined Jimmy at his house there. In 1995, Jimmy bought No 10 (his brother Billy's (John McArdle) old house) and Jimmy, Jackie and daughter Lindsey (Claire Sweeney) moved in. When Jackie discovered that Jimmy had bought the house using drug money, she began to mistrust him. Jackie was tempted into starting an affair with neighbour Ron Dixon (Vince Earl), but turned him down.

Jackie was distraught when her son "Little Jimmy" (George Christopher) was murdered by drug dealers in 1996 after he fled France to escape his debts with them. Jackie, now in her forties, later has a baby son called William.

Following Jimmy's subsequent depression, the two eventually split up and Jackie left Brookside Close in 2001. The couple later divorced and Jimmy bought her half of the house and stayed there until the Close was almost demolished two years later.

== Reception ==
In 2000, Jenkins and Sullivan won the Best On-Screen Partnership accolade at the British Soap Awards for their performances as Jackie and Jimmy.
