= South (miniseries) =

- Genre: Soap opera
- Created by: Phil Redmond
- Written by: Frank Cottrell-Boyce
- Directed by: Peter Boisseau
- Starring: Justine Kerrigan; Sean McKee; Joseph Crilly; Faith Tingle; Caroline Strong; Frank Vincent; Sharon Fryer
- Country of origin: United Kingdom
- Original language: English
- No. of seasons: 1
- No. of episodes: 2

Production
- Executive producer: Alan Horrox
- Producers: Phil Redmond; Peter Griffiths
- Running time: 25 minutes

Original release
- Network: Channel 4
- Release: 14 March – 21 March 1988

Related
- Brookside

South is a British drama miniseries created by Phil Redmond for Channel 4. It is a spin-off of the soap opera Brookside. It consists of two episodes and was first broadcast on 14 March 1988. South was produced by Thames Television with Redmond and Peter Griffiths as producers. The two episodes were written by Frank Cottrell-Boyce and directed by Peter Boisseau. The miniseries was created to be shown as part of Thames Television’s educatory series The English Programme. The premise of the series is a depiction of two teenagers moving to London to better their lives but are faced with a harsh reality. The main themes are lack of employment and inadequate living conditions for young people. It stars Justine Kerrigan as Tracy Corkhill and Sean McKee as Jamie Henderson, whose characters feature in the Brookside series.

The miniseries was created after the broadcast of another Brookside spin-off titled Damon and Debbie. Unlike the main show, South was recorded on film rather than videotape which gave it a different visual style. Brookside also used music composed in-house but South features prominent popular music. New characters were created to appear in the story and British singer Morrissey also makes a cameo appearance. A press screening event was held in London to promote the show. It was broadcast across two Monday morning slots during March 1988. South was not as well received as its predecessor Damon and Debbie and did not garner its high ratings.

== Premise ==
A miniseries focussing on the difficulties facing young people in the British city London during the 1980s. South primarily follows Jamie and Tracy's adventure as they face unemployment and inadequate living conditions in the city.

== Cast and characters ==
- Justine Kerrigan as Tracy Corkhill
- Sean McKee as Jamie Henderson
- Joseph Crilly as Santa
- Faith Tingle as Louanne
- Caroline Strong as Jazz
- Frank Vincent as Vinny
- Sharon Fryer as Tracy Fitt
- Norman Warwick as Foreman
- Morrissey as Himself

== Episodes ==
No.	Title	Directed by	Written by	Original release date
1	"Part One"	Peter Boisseau	Frank Cottrell-Boyce	14 March 1988
Jazz tempts Tracy and Jamie to go to London with the promise of work at her club. They travel by coach and witness London's famous sights. Jamie has his wallet stolen and they discover Jazz's club has been demolished. Tracy witnesses young homeless people and begins to regret coming to London. They go to Jazz's home, where Santa informs them she Jazz left without paying her rent. Tracy Fitt takes pity on them and allows them to stay but the house is in poor condition. Tracy gets to know her housemate Louanne, who works as a cat-o-gram. Santa takes Jamie to a job agency where Vinny finds them work pot washing.
2	"Part Two"	Peter Boisseau	Frank Cottrell Boyce	21 March 1988
Jamie accompanies Santa working on a building site. When an accident occurs, Jamie defends Santa and gets into an argument with the foreman and is sacked. Tracy is star-struck when she meets the singer Morrissey. Louanne takes her along to one of her jobs and to a nightclub. Tracy begins to warm to her new lifestyle. Vinny refuses to give Jamie anymore work and Santa abandons him. Vinny tells Jamie the harsh reality of working life and convinces him to return to Liverpool. All the housemates are evicted and their belongings thrown into the street. Jamie tries to convince Tracy to return home. They board a train home together but Tracy changes her mind and walks off into the London city centre alone.

== Production ==
=== Development ===
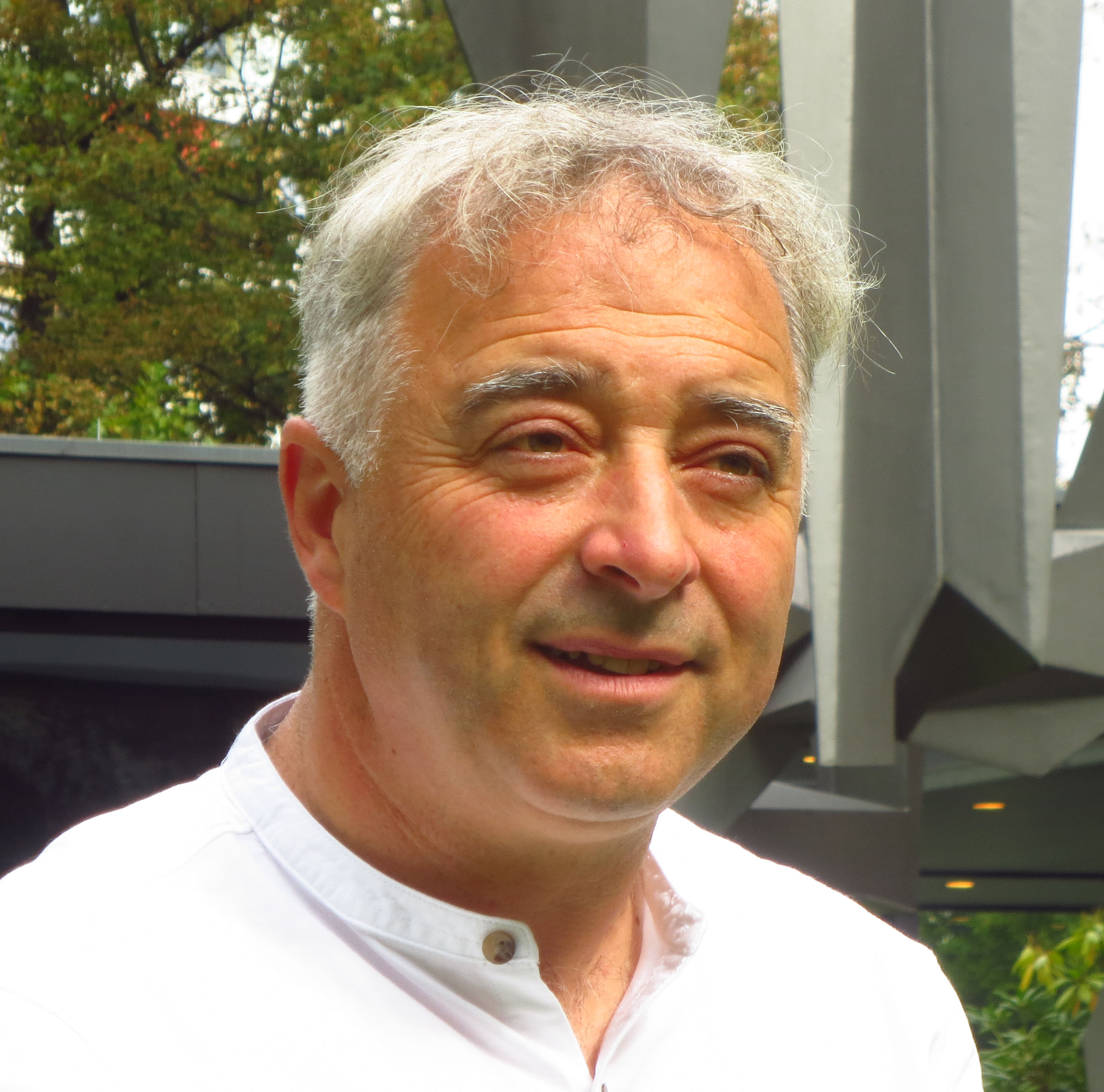
Frank Cottrell-Boyce wrote both episodes of South

On 21 November 1987, Roy West from the Liverpool Echo announced the commission of South. Another Brookside spin-off series titled Damon and Debbie had finished airing on Channel 4 three days prior to the announcement. That series proved successful with high ratings and Mersey Television bosses were keen to launch more. The shows were being referred to as "soap bubbles" rather than spin-offs. Mersey Television partnered with Thames Television to create the series and worked with Channel 4's educatory series The English Programme. The series was aimed at a demographic of ages thirteen to eighteen year olds. South was pitched by Brookside's creator Phil Redmond, who thought it would be a good story to explore the north–south divide in England. West revealed that South would focus on Brookside's established characters Tracy Corkhill (Justine Kerrigan) and Jamie Henderson (Sean McKee). Redmond noted that people had a perception that London "fantastic" and northern England was "doom and gloom". He wanted to change this view and show nationwide issues. He also wanted to get young people talking about the series. He explained "the problems these kids face are subtle and complex and I want them to talk about things."

Redmond revealed that the production would enter filming in January 1988, with a scheduled release date of March 1988. Redmond and Peter Griffiths took on the roles of producers. Both episodes were written by Frank Cottrell-Boyce. Peter Boisseau was hired to direct both episodes. South was developed to consist of two thirty-minute episodes. The co-production worked with Mersey Television supplying actors, writers and extra cast with Thames Television providing film crews and technical back-up.

It was decided that South's stories would run parallel to Brookside's. Tracy and Jamie's South plot corresponds from the point they leave Liverpool in an episode of Brookside and later resumes upon their return. Redmond had also chosen to create the spin-off around two of its well known characters. Tracy was already established as controversial teen character. Redmond previously had to defend Tracy and Jamie's safe-sex storyline featured in Brookside, to the British regulatory body, Independent Broadcasting Authority.

In 1988, Ken Irwin (Daily Mirror) publicised details about South, announcing that Tracy and Jamie would take on the role of "two unemployed youngsters looking for work and adventure" in London. McKee told Irwin that "Jamie and Tracy come to London in search of a new life together, thinking the streets are paved with gold." McKee noted the realism of the story and understood his character from his own experiences of unemployment living in London. McKee worked shifts pot washing and on a building site with poor safety, which Jamie experiences in South. He also hoped South would not deter viewers from similar lifestyle changes like Jamie does, but wanted them to make a more informed decision. Griffiths revealed that some themes were unemployment and poor living condition. He claimed that South would be a "hard-hitting drama" exploring the "urgent issues" teenagers faced during 1980s Britain. Kerrigan revealed that working on South "really thought me a great deal about the problems of being alone and homelessness."

Writers created a host of new characters for Tracy and Jamie to interact with. These included Jazz (Caroline Strong) who is an old friend of Jamie, Jazz's ex-housemates Santa (Joseph Crilly), Tracy Fitt (Sharon Fryer) and Louanne (Faith Tingle), who works as a cat-o-gram. Also added was a job agency worker, Vinny (Frank Vincent) whose character was used to accentuate the lack of employment opportunities for young people. Fryer revealed that Tracy Fitt is a "small part" in the series. She described Tracy as a single mother living in a squat and stated she was "dead chuffed" to get the role. Fyrer also claimed there was a possibility of the new characters crossing-over into the main Brookside series. McKee revealed that Tracy would strike up a friendship with Louanne while visiting nightclubs, but Jamie would struggle to adapt to the London lifestyle. British singer Morrissey was hired to make a cameo appearance in a scene also featuring Tracy. South included popular music from the era including tracks by Aztec Camera and Pet Shop Boys. This was a first as Brookside only used in-house music composed by Mersey Television Head of Music, Steve Wright.

=== Filming ===
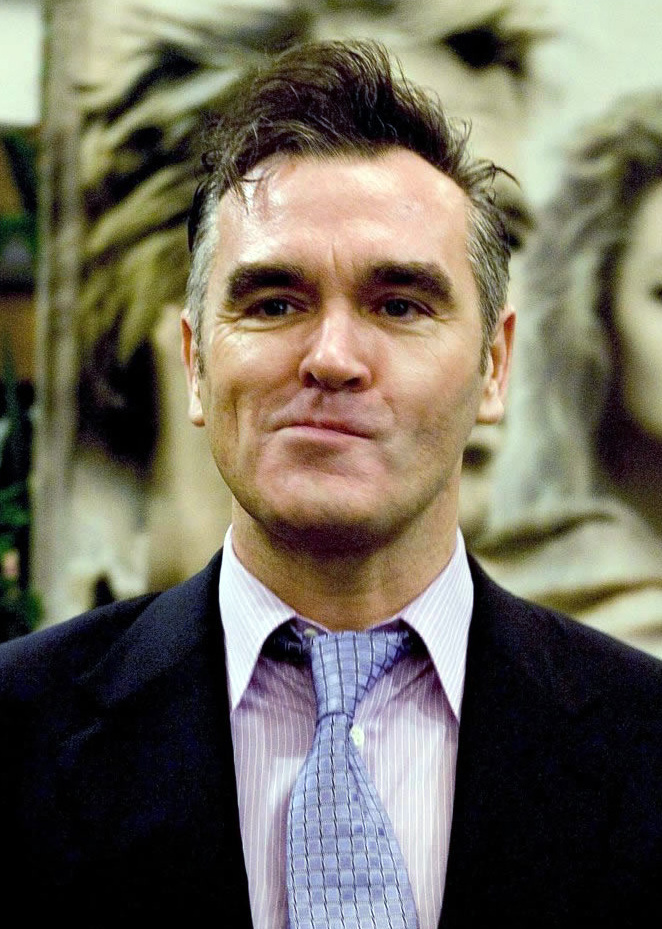
British singer Morrissey filmed a cameo appearance for "Part Two" of South.

Filming took place as planned in January and February 1988 and took six weeks to complete. Filming took place on location in London. South was filmed on film which was a departure from videotape which was used for Brookside and Damon and Debbie. This removed the "raw" effects achieved while filming the latter to give South a different style.

During an interview with author Matt Jacobson, Kerrigan revealed the crew of Thames Television made Kerrigan and McKee feel welcome. Kerrigan said the production of South received a bigger financial budget compared to Brookside and a "real glimpse" of working for a "big television company". Kerrigan had to work away from home during filming. A chauffeur was provided to transport her during location filming and the cast made use of a winnebago whilst preparing for scenes. Kerrigan recalled that filming with Morrissey was memorable despite previously meeting him. On filming South, Kerrigan added "I had a great time there, and it was a wrench when I had to leave to come home. But Frank Cottrell-Boyce wrote us a lovely script and it was just a pleasure. I'm so grateful for that experience." McKee had previously lived in London and was glad when filming had finished and he had returned to Liverpool.

In a 1988 interview with NME, Morrissey revealed that he had "three or four lines" of dialogue during filming. He was required to attend in "normal costume" and filmed his cameo in the Capital London building foyer. Morrissey branded his acting as "incredibly duff" and would most probably "be edited down" during post-production. He also described his acting as "compulsive non-viewing , essentially kettle-on-time."

== Promotion and broadcast ==
To promote South, Channel 4 held a press screening event in London. These were complete with invitations and running orders featuring photographs of McKee and Kerrigan. She recalled being in awe of the event and believed it boosted her confidence professionally. "Part One" of South was first broadcast on Channel 4 on Monday 14 March 1988 at 10:33 AM. "Part Two" followed on Monday 21 March 1988. It was broadcast during the time slots reserved for programmes linked to Channel 4's educatory content made for schools. On 16 May 1988, South was broadcast on TVS and ITV London in an edited hour long special episode. In the Channel Islands, South was broadcast on 16 May 1988 via Channel Television in an hour-long format.

The series was made available by STV Group to watch via their STV Player streaming service from 26 February 2025. It was retitled "South: A Brookside Special" and was streamed in a condensed 48 minute episode.

== Reception ==
South was not as well received by viewers as its predecessor, Damon and Debbie. Author Graham Kibble-White later assessed that early morning time-slots prevented the episodes from gaining high ratings that could be achieved during primetime viewing. Kibble-White believed the South's reputation did not match the "quality of the producing, directing, acting or script." He added it "remains an often overlooked, but wholly worthwhile part of the Brookside stable."

Kieran Fagan of the Irish Independent included the first episode in his "highlights of the week" feature. He opined that "fans will need to encouragement to abandon Gaybo on Monday morning and tune into episode one of this spin-off featuring Jamie and the unlovely but ever-so-believable Tracy". A critic from the Herts and Essex Observer described it as a "hard-hitting drama" exploring the "more urgent social issues of contemporary teenagers." Tim Oglethorpe from Birmingham Mail branded the series a "powerful hard-hitting drama" which "aims to explore some of the issues today's teenagers face." Their colleague Graham Young included South in his "TV Highlights" feature but criticised it for being in the same "mould as the disappointingly thin Damon and Debbie."

In a critical review printed in The Stage, Ann Nugent wrote that of South was about "all that glisters not being gold." She opined that it "amalgamates" the British north–south divide with the shared problems teenagers face when they leave education. Nugent praised Boisseau's directing and believed it deserved an hour long prime-time broadcast. The critic further heaped praise, stating "South is a tight drama, beautifully built up frame by frame, with nothing extraneous in Peter Boisseau's direction, and with a raw honesty that forces its way into the consciousness of young people and adults alike." A writer from the Reading Post called it a "gritty and realistic look at what happens when two youngsters leave depressed Liverpool and head for the horn of plenty." South was criticised in the 1996 book, "The Guinness Book of Classic British TV". It was noted that Brookside failed to make their point clear; stating that Tracy and Jamie "escaping to London to look for fame and fortune. They found only grim reality, but if the producers wanted to make the point that it was grim down south as well, it was perhaps not a good idea to have them step straight off the train and unrealistically bump into Morrissey."
