= Gladys Ambrose =

English actress

- Born: 28 December 1930; Everton, Liverpool, Lancashire, England
- Died: 4 July 1998 (aged 67); Knowsley Village, Merseyside, England
- Occupation: Actress
- Spouse: Johannes Duiveman (1954–1996)
- Children: 2

Gladys Ambrose (28 December 1930 – 4 July 1998) was an English actress of film and television, best known for her role as the gossipy Julia Brogan on the long-running soap opera, Brookside, which she played from 1985 until just before her death from cancer in July 1998 at the age of 67.

== Family ==
Ambrose was born in Everton, Liverpool, Lancashire. She was married to Johannes Duiveman from 1954 until his death in 1996; they had two children, Janette and Wendy. Janette moved to Doncaster and still performs with her husband Robert Baker, and Wendy still resides in Liverpool with her husband Colin. Gladys and her husband formed a comedy acrobatic act early in their careers.

== Funeral ==
Ambrose died in Knowsley Village, Lancashire, aged 67. At the service, at St Mary's Church, Knowsley village, near Liverpool, Brookside's Phil Redmond and actor John Burgess gave a eulogy. "There is no doubt that old Gladys had a spirit that was very difficult to beat", Redmond said. "It's great to share her last bill and it's standing room only and not a dry eye in the house. We'll miss her will, that spirit of inspiration, and her sense of professionalism. She was a lovely woman."
