= Billy Corkhill =

Fictional character from the Channel 4 soap opera Brookside

- Brookside character
- Portrayed by: John McArdle
- Duration: 1985–1990
- First appearance: 27 August 1985
- Last appearance: 21 September 1990
- Created by: Phil Redmond
- Introduced by: Phil Redmond
- Spin-off appearances: Hollyoaks (2025)
In-universe information
- Other names: William John Corkhill
- Occupation: Electrician; Factory worker
- Father: Albie Corkhill
- Mother: Margaret Corkhill
- Brothers: Jimmy Corkhill; Frankie Corkhill
- Wife: Doreen Brogan (until 1990); Sheila Grant (1990–present)
- Sons: Rod Corkhill
- Daughters: Tracy Corkhill
- Stepsons: Barry Grant
- Stepdaughters: Karen Grant; Claire Grant
- Nephews: Little Jimmy Corkhill; William Corkhill
- Nieces: Lindsey Corkhill
- First cousins: Don Corkhill

Billy Corkhill is a fictional character from the British Channel 4 soap opera Brookside, played by John McArdle. The character debuted on-screen during the episode broadcast on 27 August 1985. Billy was introduced as part of the show's new family, the Corkhills, consisting of Billy, his wife Doreen Corkhill (Kate Fitzgerald), and their teenage children, Rod (Jason Hope) and Tracy Corkhill (Justine Kerrigan). Billy is characterised as the reluctant husband of Doreen, an aspiring woman who wants the Corkhills to own their own home. Her mission to present a good image for the family is marred by her secret spending which gets the family into debt. Writers explored their debt issues throughout Billy's early tenure. They portrayed him as desperate to provide, tampering with the electricity and committing fraud with the help of his brother Jimmy Corkhill (Dean Sullivan).

Writers portrayed Billy having a mental breakdown in which he drives his car over his neighbours' front gardens. McArdle has said it was his favourite storyline as Billy. Doreen's over spending and Billy's crime of armed robbery eventually end their marriage. Producers then paired the character with Sheila Grant (Sue Johnston) and they later marry. Doreen returned to the series but Billy decides to remain loyal to Sheila. Billy was well received by viewers, especially for his representation of unemployed men in British society during the 1980s. Television critics have praised on McArdle's portrayal of Billy. Allan Crow from Fife Today branded Billy a "legendary soap character" and Andrew Bullock from the Daily Express opined that McArdle was an "integral" cast member "in Brookside's heyday". The character also became subjected to controversy when the Independent Broadcasting Authority investigated Brookside after an episode depicted Billy holding durex condoms. The regulator later retracted their complaint and praised the show. McArdle reprised the role of Billy in 2025 in several special Brookside and Hollyoaks crossover episodes as part of latter's 30th Anniversary.

== Casting ==
McArdle was performing in a play which he thought was so awful he wanted to quit. The director convinced him to stay with the promise of helping secure further work. In the play, McArdle put on a Scouse accent and a Brookside producer witnessed his performance which resulted in an audition. The director was then hired by Brookside and they helped McArdle secure the role of Billy. Kate Fitzgerald was hired to play Billy's wife Doreen. Jason Hope and Justine Kerrigan were then cast as their children, Rod and Tracy respectively. In an interview about his casting, Hope recalled that he had to meet with McArdle and Fitzgerald to ensure they "could pass of as family members." Kerrigan branded McArdle a "brilliant actor and a lovely man" and praised the casting dynamic of the Corkhills. She added that McArdle "was another delight to work with [...] John would take you by surprise with the energy he put into everything, he kept you on your toes. He would start off in some scenes and I would have no idea where it would go, he was amazing at that."

== Development ==
=== Introduction and family ===
Billy's profession is an electrician and the Corkhills move to Brookside Close from a council housing estate. Billy is characterised as a devoted husband who loves his wife Doreen enough to risk financial ruin by purchasing a home of their own. Despite being an electrician by trade, Billy works at a processed food factory. In the book Brookside: The Official Companion, Billy is described as a "be-denimed Derek Hatton look-alike" who has lived most of his life on a council estate. In his backstory, Billy had been led astray by his "villainous" brothers but his marriage to Doreen proved a "stabilising influence". He is portrayed as the reluctant husband to "aspiring" wife Doreen. Writers pitted the Corkhills against their more socialist neighbours, the Grant family. Billy has to contend with Doreen's "shopaholic" tendencies, as she competes with the Collins family and presents a "good image" of the Corkhills, an image she portrays despite knowing Billy's family have a "shady" side.

Billy's plight resonated well with viewers, especially those facing hardship in 1980s Britain. McArdle started to receive letters from male viewers who believed that Billy's story was identical to their own experiences. McArdle's performance also blurred fiction and reality with some viewers. The actor received job offers from businessmen and a young viewer sent their £2 pocket money to the Brookside set to help Billy. So convincing was Billy's character that a gangster approached McArdle in a bar offering advice how to commit better robberies. McArdle felt that Billy's unemployment story was his "hardest" story. He told Richard Johnson from TV Guide that "I've been in trade unions, I've been on picket lines - for me that was the very hardest thing I had to do."

A controversial story for the Corkhills was created when Tracy begins a romance with her geography teacher Peter Montague (Mark Draper). After the pair return from a skiing trip, Billy goes to the school and punches Peter. Billy is arrested for assault and later given a three month prison sentence, suspended for a year. At the time, Lucy O'Brien from The Guardian described it as the "most dramatic analysis" of child abuse on television. She added that "pugnacious Billy" had to face the fact his "wayward daughter" was in love with her teacher; the story subsequently played out over a "tense month". From this producers developed an issue lead story for the Corkhills, as they deal with the problems that arise from debts. Billy is sacked from his job at Pollocks because his court case garnered negative publicity. The Corkhills mounting debts result in their utilities being cut off and their television is repossessed. Billy tries to help his family out of debt by tampering with the electricity supply. This causes problems with his son Rod, who is training to be a police officer. Writers continued to develop the story into 1987. Billy's brother, Jimmy Corkhill (Dean Sullivan) convinces him to allow him to stage a burglary at his home but Jimmy also steals from the Collins family to make it appear genuine. This upsets Doreen and she discovers the stolen property and the bank begin repossession proceedings. After all of Billy's crimes, McArdle told Johnson (TV Guide) that "at one time I thought I couldn't live next door to Billy Corkhill." He added that the supermarket robbery would continue to be an issue for Billy, adding that the writers "can bring that up at any time."

=== Mental breakdown ===
"Billy just felt like a total failure - that his wife had nearly turned to prostitution because of him being unemployed. He smacked her. She threw the key in the mud. He got into the car and drove round the gardens totally berserk - oh, I did all my own driving, by the way. [...] Emotionally, the crew was so sensitive about it all."

— McArdle on Billy's breakdown. (1989)

Writers created one of the show's "significant moments" when they created a large hole in the middle of Brookside Close. The hole was actually dug into one of the back garden sets as it was impractical to dig into the actual road. Camera trickery was used to make character interaction with the hole appear authentic. The significance of the hole in relation to Billy was that other characters drove over his front garden lawn to avoid the hole. Billy's unemployment cause him much stress and his neighbours' disregard for his home results in Billy having a breakdown. Billy retaliates by going on a rampage in his car, driving all over the other front gardens on Brookside Close.

McArdle told Graham Kibble-White, the author of 20 Years of Brookside, that his character reacted badly because he suspected Doreen of having an affair with her work boss at the dentists. Doreen had not had an affair with her boss but he could not believe she was willing to have sex with him in exchange for money. McArdle told Johnson that "Billy just felt like a total failure - that his wife had nearly turned to prostitution because of him being unemployed. He smacked her. She threw the key in the mud." Billy subsequently felt like his "whole word [and] his whole family were falling down." Kibble-White believed that the car scene perfectly demonstrated the desperation that Billy. He felt like a "non-person" whose neighbours disrespected him for being a "dole-ite". Ken Horn, who directed the episode added that it was a well-remembered Brookside moment and credited its success to McArdle and Fitzgerald's "terrific" acting. McArdle was allowed to perform the driving stunt himself. He added "it was a gift to get material like that and to be able to actually do it." After the scenes were broadcast, viewers sympathised with Billy's plight and told him that he had "exorcised" all of their feelings on-screen. Billy's breakdown was filmed in one take because McArdle wanted to capture the emotion. He added that the crew were sensitive and rehearsed without McArdle and Fitzgerald until the final take. McArdle added that too much rehearsal would have "diminished" the authenticity of the scene.

The debt story culminated in the break-down of Billy and Doreen's marriage. He becomes desperate for money and participates in an armed robbery at a supermarket. Billy drives the getaway vehicle but the supermarket manager is injured. Doreen decides to leave Billy, but keeps his involvement a secret from Rod. She leaves in November 1987 and in February 1988, Billy travels to Bristol to find Doreen. Doreen's departure from the series occurred because Fitzgerald was exhausted and unhappy with the role. Doreen and Billy "had been going through fairly painful emotions", which won Fitzgerald and McArdle weekly praise from television critics. Fitzgerald told Anthony Hayward from TVTimes that she and other actors disliked the Corkhill's backstory because "it was a nonsense in the first place". She explained that Billy and Doreen met at a young age and she put all of her energy into her family from then on. Fitzgerald believed it "out of character" for Doreen to put her family into debt, but she praised the writers who "worked hard" to "make it believable." In 1997, McArdle said that the breakdown was his "favourite storyline of all time", adding that "it was absolutely fantastic to do".

=== Marriage to Sheila Grant ===
Billy is later paired romantically with Sheila Grant (Sue Johnston). Sheila moves into the Corkhill's house following the end of her marriage to Bobby Grant (Ricky Tomlinson). Billy develops a close friendship with Sheila and in episodes airing set on New Years Eve 1988, the pair share their first kiss. Writers developed the story into a serious relationship. In 1989 McArdle and Johnston were written out of Brookside for two months. Producers had allowed the actors the time off to appear in a theatre production. Writers reintroduced Doreen into the show in 1989 to create problems for Billy and Sheila. Fitzgerald had declined the producer's request for her return the previous year. She is reintroduced Doreen back into the Corkhill household, despite Sheila living in the home. Sheila orders Billy to get rid of Doreen, but he refuses. Sheila moves out instead and writers plotted Doreen attempting to resume her broken marriage. Fitzgerald added "I think you can assume it will be a good bit of drama."

Johnston welcomed the return of Doreen because it added drama for Billy and Sheila. She told Karen Swayne from Chat magazine that "everyone has been getting a bit nice in the Close. It's got a bit even keel and it needed conflict to give it an edge." Fitzgerald stated that she found the scripts "rather shocking" because of the dialogue the two females exchange. Johnston added that Doreen is "very uncompromising" in the way she speaks to Sheila. Doreen insults her age and accuses her of being desperate. Fitzgerald concluded that her return gave fans what they wanted. She revealed that people would approach her in public and tell her that she needed to get back with Billy because she was "breaking their hearts". In August, Doreen empties the house of Sheila's belongings and changes the locks. She then makes Billy's involvement in the supermarket robbery common knowledge causing Sheila to break-up with Billy. He later tells Doreen he does not love her and the she was written out the series once again.

Billy and Sheila's wedding took place in episodes aired in August 1990. Filming the scenes became a case of life imitating art. In the episode, Billy is late for the wedding because his car breaks down. McArdle's car actually broke down on his way to film the scenes. McArdle had to call the AA out to the motorway for help. McArdle told Andrea Kon from TVTimes that he was upset but "didn't have to think about" acting the scene out immediately after it happened for real. He added that he thought Johnston would be on set "tearing her hair out" over him.

On-screen, Billy and Rod abandon the car and run on foot to the Register Office. The wedding ceremony is nearly ruined because of Jimmy. McArdle explained that "Billy knew things would go wrong with Jimmy in charge. He doesn't trust his brother as far as he can throw him. But he's delighted he's got his girl to the altar at long last." The wedding also brought about the end to Sheila and Tracy's fraught relationship. Kerrigan told Kon that "Tracy doesn't actively dislike Sheila. She's tolerated her for her father's sake and she's pleased her dad has a chance to be happy." Off-screen production planned to cancel filming if it rained outside. The weather on that morning changed from "dull" and production went ahead. Set designers transformed the Bluecoats School board room into a make-shift Registry Office venue.

=== Godden feud and departure ===
Writers created two new feud stories for Billy. The first begins in November 1989 with Mr Trevor (Fred Bryant), after Billy rewires the electrics inside his wool shop. Mr Trevor is slow to pay Billy for the job resulting in Billy and Jimmy escalating a vendetta. Mr Trevor sends his sons Carl Trevor (Mark Moraghan) and Rob Trevor (Seamus O'Neil) to get revenge on the Corkhills. They drive a JCB digger onto Brookside Close, dig up Billy's front lawn and deposit it onto his garage roof.

The second and more significant feud revisits a long-standing rivalry between the Corkhill and Godden families. Billy and Jimmy's older brother Frankie Corkhill had been murdered by Joey Godden (Carl Chase) some years earlier. Jimmy attacks Joey inside The Swan pub, but Jimmy is later beaten and hospitalised. Godden begins to threaten the Corkhills and sends a wreath to their home reading "Billy and Sheila - R.I.P". Billy tries to reason with Godden but he vows to carry on. Billy tells Rod about his criminal past in order for him to admit the truth about the Godden feud. He asks Rod to unofficially involve himself in getting rid of Godden, but he opts to report the matter to a detective at work. Godden agrees to a truce on the condition the Corkhill's keep out of The Swan and The British Lion. Jimmy is angry about the truce and he gets their cousin Don Corkhill (Bernard Merrick) to join him for a drink in The British Lion. They are confronted by Godden and a bar fight break out, resulting in Don being murdered by Godden. Then Godden digs up Frankie's grave and removes the headstone. He then launches the headstone through the front door glass of Billy and Sheila's home. This escalation causes Barry to intervene to protect his mother, Sheila and he threatens Godden with a shotgun. Godden is scared of Barry and he agrees to leave the Corkhills alone.

McArdle and Johnston decided to leave Brookside in 1990. Off-screen the pair had planned a national theatre tour of their two-handed show titled To. Johnston revealed that producers would not be killing off their characters so that they could return in the future. Billy and Sheila's departure story featured them moving to begin a new life in Basingstoke.

=== Return to role ===
On 28 August 2025, it was announced that McArdle had reprised his role for a Brookside and Hollyoaks crossover episode as part of latter's 30th Anniversary. He appeared in additional episodes of Hollyoaks. Of his return, McArdle stated "it's going to be a nostalgic visit back to the famous close. Also I've got to try and find the character of Billy Corkhill again as I haven't played him for 35 years!" His return was announced following the confirmation that Johnston would also returning to her role as Sheila.

== Reception ==
As the men of Brookside Close go, Billy Corkhill ranks up there with the very best of them. He was a solid working-class local lad, whose battles with bouts of unemployment, troublesome children and errant wives, made him a hero to those who fought to keep their heads above water in the 80s. He remains one of Brookside's best-loved and most memorable characters.

— Jon Peake from Inside Soap profiles Billy's impact on society.

A writer from the official Brookside website stated "a dominating presence on the Close for the second half of the ‘80s, Billy Corkhill ensured his legacy would last for at least another decade." Allan Crow from Fife Today branded Billy a "legendary soap character". Tim Hughes from the Oxford Mail said that McArdle is "best known" as the "long-suffering" Billy. Patrick McLennan from What's on TV opined that Billy is a "troubled" character. Matt Wolf from The Sacramento Bee stated that Brookside's characters, such as the Corkhills, represent the British working class and their problems. They added "a typical episode shows the Corkhills behind in their rent. Tracy's job is in the balance, Billy is unemployed and Doreen bets on horses to make ends meet." Gareth McLean from The Guardian opined that Billy and Doreen were an accurate portrayal of "the aspiring lower-middle-class" living in Liverpool. Catherine Jones from the Liverpool Echo said the Corkhill's were "blighted by financial difficulties" and that McArdle was best known as Billy. McArdle agreed with Jones' assessment and revealed that he even gets recognised as Billy in Australia. Another critic from the publication believed that Doreen getting a new job and suit was another reason for Billy to whine. They added "I really think it's time she pushed the miserable little berk under a bus." Liam Rudden writing for the Edinburgh Evening News echoed this stating that McArdle is "known and loved by millions as Billy Corkhill." A Lancashire Telegraph writer stated that McArdle "won millions of fans as Billy Corkhill".

Hilary Kingsley from Sunday Mirror believed that "the semi-comic, semi-tragic Corkhills" were relatable characters because it was likely viewers knew "a nutter like Billy and a silly cow like Doreen." Reminiscing of the importance of Billy, Andrew Bullock from the Daily Express wrote "in Brookside's heyday, John was an integral part of the cast, playing Billy Corkhill – who endured a mental breakdown as part of his story line." A writer for The Guide Liverpool said "played superbly by scouse actor, John McArdle, Billy narrowly escaped a prison stay, armed robbery, periods of depression and that mad episode where he drove over all the neighbours gardens shouting 'I'm just a doleite'." Daniel Kilkelly from Digital Spy opined that Billy driving over his neighbours' driveways is one "Brookside's most memorable scenes". The Corkhills' house was depicted as the most rundown household on Brookside Close. Author Geoff Tibbals quipped "the natural starting point for any tour of the Close is the Corkhills' house, which, in the days of Doreen and Billy, was the only residence a brick through the window qualified as a home improvement."

In 2003, Frances Traynor from the Daily Record branded Billy and Sheila's romance as one of the show's "most controversial plotlines". Traynor observed that "everyone knew they were destined to be together, but it still took Billy Corkhill and Sheila Grant months to realise it. Their first kiss on New Year's Eve was as romantic as anything Hollywood could come up with." Similarly, a writer from The Observer opined that Brookside captured viewers' imaginations, adding "who did not gulp in recognition and hope when Billy Corkhill and Sheila Grant exchanged a meaningful glance across the crowded close?" They also believed that the show's stories eventually became sensationalist plotlines. They favoured early dramatic stories such as Billy's armed robbery, which "seemed to make sense". The Guardian's John Mulholland branded Billy "the neighbour from hell". A reporter from Inside Soap wrote that "we just wanted to cheer when the pair finally got it together, because if anyone deserved happiness, it was Sheila." Jim Shelley (The Guardian) opined that Billy and Sheila's departures caused the quality of Brookside to decline. Richard Johnson from TV Guide branded Billy a "daft melt", "the Scouse with the nous", Liverpool's "second coming" and concluded that "like fellow Liverpudlian Derek Hatton, Corkhill is not everyone's choice of Neighbour". Inside Soap's Jon Peake wrote that Billy is known for his fake burglaries, run-ins with gangsters and nearly making his wife a prostitute. He added that Billy was a hero to the struggling men living in Britain during the 1980s.

In 1998, writers from Inside Soap published an article about the top ten characters they wanted to return to soap. Billy was featured and they described him as Jimmy's "hot-tempered younger brother". The publication later ran a feature compiling "The 100 greatest soap stories ever told". They featured Billy and Sheila's romance as their 96th choice. They were also included in the magazine's "greatest love stories ever told" feature. A reporter wrote that "they were an unlikely couple. He was a rugged working-class hero, she was a saintly figure wracked with Catholic guilt. But when Billy took in Sheila after her husband Bobby left her, friendship grew into true love." Paul Brooks from Soaplife included Billy and Sheila in his list of "dream lovers". He assessed that Billy was "a reformed scally, a man who'd fiddled more leccy meters than Ron Dixon has had angina attacks".

An episode featured Billy discovering a packet of Durex branded condoms, belonging to his daughter Tracy and her boyfriend Jamie Henderson (Sean McKee). The scene depicted Billy with the condom's branding visible for 1.83 seconds. This caused controversy in the United Kingdom and the Independent Broadcasting Authority (IBA) lodged a complaint against Brookside claiming it featured in the scene for too long. Channel 4 asked Phil Redmond for a response to submit to the IBA. In his response he detailed how Brookside wanted to promote safe sex and educate viewers during the 1980s AIDS in the United Kingdom. The IBA changed their stance on the scene and told Redmond that it was "absolutely marvellous".
