= Kathy Jamieson =

English actress

- Born: 15 January 1957 (age 69); Burnley, Lancashire, England
- Years active: 1985–present
- Spouse: John McArdle

Kathy Jamieson (born 15 January 1957) is an English actress. Her first notable TV appearance was as Maggie Brady in educational historical drama How We Used To Live. She has appeared in British films including Business as Usual (1987) and Butterfly Kiss (1995). In her 2001–2002 role in BBC Police drama Merseybeat, she played Dawn, the wife of Inspector Jim Oulton, in turn played by her actual husband John McArdle.

Jamieson has also appeared in Emmerdale, Coronation Street, Heartbeat and Cracker.
