= Surviving Disaster =

2006 documentary television series

- Presented by: Bernard Hill
- No. of episodes: 7

Original release
- Release: 2006

Surviving Disaster is a 2006 BBC, Discovery Channel, and ProSieben co-production documentary-drama series about disasters in the 20th century, starring people who survived them. It was produced in association with France 5.

It is narrated by Bernard Hill.

== Episodes ==
1. "Munich Air Crash" – 1958 Munich air disaster
2. "Eruption at Mount St. Helens" – 1980 eruption of Mount St. Helens
3. "Chernobyl Nuclear Disaster" – 1986 Chernobyl disaster
4. "San Francisco Earthquake" – 1989 Loma Prieta earthquake
5. "Fastnet Yacht Race" – 1979 Fastnet race
6. "Iran Hostage Rescue" – 1979–1981 Iran hostage crisis
7. "The Sinking of the Estonia" – 1994 sinking of the Estonia
