= Sue Johnston =

English actress (born 1943)

Sue Johnston OBE
- Born: Susan Wright; 7 December 1943 (age 82); Warrington, Lancashire, England
- Occupation: Actress
- Years active: 1965–present
- Television: Brookside; Crime Traveller; The Royle Family; Waking the Dead; Jam and Jerusalem; Coronation Street; Being Eileen; Downton Abbey; Ann Droid
- Spouse(s): Neil Johnston (m. 1967; div. 1970) David Pammenter (m. 1976; div. 1980)
- Children: 1

Susan Johnston (née Wright; born 7 December 1943) is an English actress. She is known for portraying Sheila Grant in the Channel 4 soap opera Brookside (1982–1990), Barbara Royle in the BBC comedy The Royle Family (1998–2012), Grace Foley in the BBC drama Waking the Dead (2000–2011), Gloria Price in the ITV soap opera Coronation Street (2012–2014), Miss Denker in the ITV drama Downton Abbey (2014–2015) and Sue Bevan in the BBC sitcom Ann Droid (2026–present)

In 2000, for her work on The Royle Family, Johnston won the British Comedy Award for Best TV Comedy Actress and was nominated for the British Academy Television Award for Best Comedy Performance. In 2025, she was nominated for the British Academy Television Award for Best Supporting Actress for her work on Truelove.

== Early life ==
Johnston was born on 7 December 1943 in Warrington and grew up in Prescot, both then in Lancashire.

After working in the glass industry and as a Higher Grade tax officer, when her boyfriend was one of the pop group The Swinging Blue Jeans, Johnston worked for Brian Epstein. From the age of 21, she attended the Webber Douglas Academy of Dramatic Art in London.

== Career ==
She began her career on stage in 1965 at the Theatre Royal, St Helen's, and she worked predominantly in theatre during the 1970s, including with Theatre in Education at the Belgrade Theatre in Coventry. Johnston made her television debut in 1982, with a minor recurring role on Coronation Street, portraying the role of Mrs. Chadwick, the wife of a bookmaker.

From 1982 to 1990, she appeared as Sheila Grant in the soap opera Brookside. She appeared in the show's debut episode on 2 November 1982 – broadcast on the first day Channel 4 went on air – and her last episode was aired in September 1990, when the character was written out of the series following her divorce from Bobby Grant (Ricky Tomlinson) and remarriage to Billy Corkhill (John McArdle).

Johnston went on to appeared in several drama series and films, including Inspector Morse, Hetty Wainthropp Investigates, Brassed Off and My Uncle Silas. In 1992, Johnston appeared in the three-part award-winning drama Goodbye Cruel World, in which she portrayed a woman coming to terms with a muscle-wasting illness.

She was the subject of This Is Your Life in 1998.

Johnston played Barbara Royle in the BBC comedy series The Royle Family, appearing from 1998 until 2012, alongside her former on-screen husband in Brookside, Ricky Tomlinson.

From 2000 to 2011, she starred in the television series Waking the Dead, in which she played the role of psychological profiler Grace Foley, alongside Trevor Eve.

In 2002, Johnston presented the documentary The Virgin Mary, in which she examined a hypothetical life story of the historical Mary.

In 2004, she appeared in one episode of the series, Who Do You Think You Are?, in which she traced her family tree.

She starred in Jennifer Saunders's comedy drama Jam & Jerusalem on BBC One, alongside Joanna Lumley, Maggie Steed and David Mitchell. The first series aired in 2006, the second series began on New Year's Day 2008 and the third in August 2009. Also in 2008, she played Affery Flintwinch in the BBC adaptation of Little Dorrit. In May 2008 it was confirmed Johnston would return as Barbara Royle for another episode of The Royle Family, which aired on Christmas Day 2008 on BBC One. The show returned for further Christmas specials in 2009, 2010 and 2012. She shared a role with Billie Piper in the television adaptation of A Passionate Woman which aired on BBC One on 11 April 2010.

On 2 April 2012, Coronation Street series producer Phil Collinson announced Johnston had joined the soap opera as Gloria, the mother of Stella Price (played by Michelle Collins). She made her first screen appearance on 5 September 2012. It was announced in June 2013 that Johnston would leave the soap opera in 2014 to pursue other acting roles. She departed on 21 February 2014.

In December 2011, she played Eileen Lewis in the BBC one-off drama Lapland, a role which she reprised in 2013 for a series, Being Eileen.

In May 2014, it was announced that Johnston would guest star in the fifth series of the period drama Downton Abbey. She played Denker, a lady's maid to the Dowager Countess, played by Dame Maggie Smith.

In 2018, Johnston played Ivy-Rae in the BBC drama series, Age Before Beauty and in August 2019, she played Joan in the second series of Hold the Sunset.

In 2021, she appeared in the TV film, Help.

In 2022, she appeared in the Channel 5 series Witness Number 3. In the same year she reprised her role as Denker in the film Downton Abbey: A New Era.

In 2024, Johnston was announced to appear as a contestant in the "New Year Treat 2025" special of Taskmaster, alongside David James, Hannah Fry, Martin Lewis, and Melanie Blatt. She won the special.

In August 2025, it was announced Johnston would reprise her role of Sheila Grant as part of the 30th anniversary celebrations of Hollyoaks in a special crossover episode with Brookside. In 2026 she starred in BBC1's Ann Droid, a situation-comedy co-written by and starring Diane Morgan.

== Personal life ==
Johnston is a supporter of the Labour Party and has been an outspoken gay rights campaigner. She is a supporter of Liverpool F.C. and St Helens R.F.C.

In 1967, she married her first husband Neil Johnston and became pregnant at the age of 24. She suffered a miscarriage shortly after and the couple later divorced, but she kept his surname as her professional name. She has one son, Joel, from her second marriage to David Pammenter. She has two grandchildren.

Johnston is staunchly opposed to smoking. She quit smoking in 1978, but had to smoke low-tar cigarettes while playing the role of Barbara in The Royle Family.

In 1970, Johnston was sexually attacked at the age of 27. Her experiences inspired a Brookside storyline, where Johnson's character Sheila Grant was raped.

In 1989, Johnston, assisted by Lesley Thomson, published her first book, a memoir titled Hold on to the Messy Times. In 2011, she published another memoir titled Things I Couldn't Tell My Mother. In Things I Couldn't Tell My Mother, she states that she was originally going to be called Margaret Jane Wright, after her mother and grandmother, but her father thought that it would be best to call her Susan.

She is distantly related to horse trainer Mark Prescott, via her maternal line, as discovered by ITV's DNA Journey which was broadcastt on 16 October 2024. His grandfather, one of their relatives in common, was Conservative Member of Parliament William Prescott.

=== Honours ===
Johnston was appointed Officer of the Order of the British Empire (OBE) in the 2009 Birthday Honours. In November 2010, she was awarded an honorary doctorate by University of Chester at Chester Cathedral.

She was made a Freeman of the City of Liverpool in June 2024.

== Filmography ==
=== Film ===
Year	Title	Role	Directed by	Notes
1996	Brassed Off	Vera	Mark Herman	
1997	Preaching to the Perverted	Esmeralda	Stuart Urban	
1997	Face	Alice	Antonia Bird	
2001	New Year's Day	Mrs. Fisher	Suri Krishnamma	
2005	Imagine Me & You	Ella	Ol Parker	
2014	500 Miles North	Stein	Luke Massey	
2015	Caring for the Recently Deceased	Marjoram Bryon	Henry Davies	Short film
2016	Golden Years	Nancy	John Miller	
2016	Motherland	Mary	Abe Juckes	Short film
2018	Walk Like a Panther	Gladys	Dan Cadan	
2022	Downton Abbey: A New Era	Gladys Denker	Simon Curtis	
2024	Bilby	Nancy	Cyrus Mirzashafa	
2025	Fackham Hall	Great Aunt Bonaparte	Jim O'Hanlon	
2026	Welcome to Borovia	Matrashka	John McKenzie	

=== Television ===
Year	Title	Role	Notes
1982	Coronation Street	Mrs. Chadwick	3 episodes
1982–1990	Brookside	Sheila Grant/Corkhill	Series regular; 504 episodes
1991	The Grove Family	Mum	TV film
1991–1992	In Suspicious Circumstances	Edith Rosse	3 episodes
1992	Goodbye Cruel World	Barbara Grade	3 episodes
1992	Inspector Morse	Mrs. Bailey	Episode 6.4 – "Absolute Conviction"
1992	ScreenPlay	Miriam Johnson	Episode 7.4 – "Bitter Harvest"
1992	A Touch of Frost	Phyllis Bowman	Episode 1.3 – "Conclusions"
1992–1995	Medics	Ruth Parry	29 episodes
1993	Full Stretch	Grace Robbins	6 episodes
1993	Luv	Terese Craven	18 episodes
1994	Performance	Mistress Overdone	Episode 4.2 – "Measure for Measure"
1996	Into the Fire	Lyn	Miniseries – 3 episodes
1996	Hetty Wainthropp Investigates	Helga Allowby	Episode 2.2 – "Poison Pen"
1996	Village	Village Hall Player	TV film
1997	Crime Traveller	DCI Kate Grisham	8 episodes
1998	The Things You Do for Love: Against the Odds	Pat Phoenix	TV film
1998	Verdict	Hazel De Vere QC	Episode 1.3 – "The Doctor's Opinion"
1998	Duck Patrol	Val Rutland	6 episodes
1998	The Jump	Maeve Brunos	4 episodes
1998–2000, 2006–2012	The Royle Family	Barbara Royle	25 episodes
1999	The Unseen Royals	Narrator (voice)	TV film
1999	Sex, Chips & Rock n' Roll	Irma Brookes	6 episodes
2000–2011	Waking the Dead	Dr. Grace Foley	92 episodes
2001	Score	Maggie	TV film
2001–2003	My Uncle Silas	Mrs. Betts	9 episodes
2002	Happy Together	Val	TV film
2002	The Virgin Mary	Presenter	Documentary
2004	Cutting It	Caroline Ferraday	Episode 3.4
2004–2005	Higglytown Heroes	Fran (voice) (UK)	28 episodes
2006	The Street	Brenda McDermott	Episode 1.2 – "Stan"
2006–2009	Jam & Jerusalem	Sal Vine	19 episodes
2008	Little Dorrit	Affery Flintwinch	9 episodes
2009	The Turn of the Screw	Sarah Grose	TV film
2010	A Passionate Woman	Betty	2 episodes
2011	Sugartown	Margery	3 episodes
2011	Lapland	Eileen Lewis	TV film
2012	Gates	Miss Hunter	5 episodes
2012–2014	Coronation Street	Gloria Price	Regular role; 169 episodes
2013	Being Eileen	Eileen Lewis	6 episodes
2013	Comic Relief: Red Nose Day 2013	Barbara Royle	TV Special
2014–2015	Downton Abbey	Gladys Denker	8 episodes
2016	Rovers	Doreen	6 episodes
2018	Kiri	Celia Grayson	2 episodes
2018	Moving On	Kathy	Episode 9.2 – "Lost"
2018	The Good Karma Hospital	Virginia Mileham	Episode 2.6
2018	Age Before Beauty	Ivy-Rae	All 6 episodes
2018	Death on the Tyne	Colleen	TV film
2018–2019	Hold the Sunset	Joan	5 episodes
2019	The Cure	Bella Bailey	TV film
2019–2021	The Cockfields	Sue	10 episodes
2020	Unprecedented	Violet	Episode 1.5
2021	Time	June Cobden	3 episodes
2021	Help	Gloria	TV film
2022	Witness Number 3	Cathy	4 episodes
2023–2024	Celebrity Gogglebox	Herself	4 episodes
2024	Truelove	Marion	5 episodes
2024	Ricky, Sue and a Trip or Two	Herself	3 episodes; with Ricky Tomlinson
2024	The Responder	Madge	Episode 2.3
2024	Generation Z	Cecily	6 episodes
2024	DNA Journey	Herself	Episode 5.2 – "Ricky Tomlinson and Sue Johnston"
2024	Taskmaster	Herself	New Years Treat 2025
2025	Riot Women	Auntie Mary	6 episodes
2025	Hollyoaks	Sheila Grant	1 episode
2025	Play for Today	Edith Thistle	Episode: "Big Winners"
2025	Stuffed	Lily	TV Movie
2026	Ann Droid	Sue Bevan	6 episodes
2026	Sherwood	Irene Bostall	

Additional credits

- Brookside: The Lost Weekend ... Sheila Corkhill (1997 video special)
- Brookside: Friday the 13th ... Sheila Corkhill (1998 video special)
- 2013 BBC Sports Personality of the Year ... Herself
