= Jimmy Corkhill =

Fictional character from the Channel 4 soap opera Brookside

- Brookside character
- Portrayed by: Dean Sullivan
- Duration: 1986–2003
- First appearance: 24 February 1986
- Last appearance: 4 November 2003
- Created by: Phil Redmond
- Spin-off appearances: Brookside: The Lost Weekend (1997); Brookside: Friday the 13th (1998)
In-universe information
- Occupation: Teacher; Barman; Drug dealer Thief
- Father: Albie Corkhill
- Mother: Margaret Corkhill
- Brothers: Billy Corkhill; Frankie Corkhill
- Wife: Jackie Corkhill (until 2001)
- Sons: Little Jimmy Corkhill; William Corkhill
- Daughters: Lindsey Corkhill
- Granddaughters: Kylie Corkhill
- Nephews: Rod Corkhill
- Nieces: Tracy Corkhill
- First cousins: Don Corkhill

Jimmy Corkhill is a fictional character from Brookside, played by Dean Sullivan, who joined the series in 1986. Jimmy originally appeared on a recurring basis appearing alongside his brother, Billy (John McArdle), before becoming a regular character, featured in major storylines, and remained in the show until its end 17 years later. He is cited as one of the show's most popular characters, and was the longest-featured character. Jimmy has often been cited as a lovable rogue by television critics.

== Casting ==
Jimmy is played by Dean Sullivan. He later became the longest-serving cast member in the soap's history. Sullivan was initially only contracted to appear in six episodes as a recurring character, but due to his popularity he was taken on full-time and remained for seventeen years. When the soap was cancelled, Sullivan said he felt bereaved and it was like losing an old friend.

Jimmy is often described as a rogue.

== Storylines ==
Jimmy first appears in Brookside when his brother Billy moves in and is in the process of building the extension to No.10. His first scene in the close features Billy and Paul Collins (Jim Wiggins), another close resident, who is the architect responsible for designing the extension.

Jimmy comes and goes for a couple of years as a sporadic character while the Corkhill family are introduced. His first major storyline involves an insurance "job" on Billy's house. For a year or so, Billy has been in dire financial straits, and Jimmy talks him into what he thinks a surefire winner. When Billy's son, Rod (Jason Hope), graduates from police college, Jimmy does the insurance job (in daylight) and completely trashes the Corkhill’s house in the process to make it look a bit more convincing to the police and the insurance company. When Billy returns from the graduation later that day, he is mortified at the amount of damage Jimmy had done to his house, and it temporarily puts a strain on their relationship.

In the early-to-mid 1990s, Jimmy became an integral part of the storylines. He first suffers from a drug addiction, which nearly destroys his marriage to Jackie (Sue Jenkins). He has numerous jobs, such as being a barman and bouncer at Bar Brookie, working for Mick Johnson (Louis Emerick) in his pizza takeaway, a cleaner in a school, and as a history teacher at his local school. In November 1993, Jimmy's contacts begin to get arrested and he decides to flee the close. When driving, he takes a hit of cocaine to steady his nerves, which affects his driving and causes his neighbour, Frank Rogers (Peter Christian) to swerve off a road and crash. Frank is badly injured, and dies just after arriving at the hospital. Jimmy drives some of the relatives to hospital, and when they arrive he learns that Frank had just died and that Tony Dixon (Mark Lennock) is in serious condition.

Within a month of the crash, Tony is diagnosed as being in a persistent vegetative state, and doctors say that he is unlikely to ever regain consciousness, but his father Ron (Vince Earl) is determined to help him recover. Jimmy helps fundraise to help the Dixon family find a cure, but Tony dies in February 1994. At Ron's request, Jimmy becomes a pallbearer at Tony's funeral, but he cracks under guilt at the graveside and confesses that he caused the crash.

Jimmy's drug problem worsens as he is racked with guilt over the crash, and when Jackie catches him taking drugs in their bathroom just before Christmas 1993, he confesses the crash to her and that drugs are his way of coping with the guilt. She tells no one else about his confession, and tries to talk Jimmy into believing that the crash was not all his fault, as it had already been revealed that Frank had been over the drink-drive limit when the crash happened.

Jimmy starts taking ecstasy in 1994, and Sullivan reportedly suggested the storyline should have ended with Jimmy dying to warn young viewers about the dangers of taking drugs.

In January 1995, Jimmy and Eddie Banks (Paul Broughton) find the body of Trevor Jordache (Bryan Murray), who had been killed two years earlier by his wife Mandy (Sandra Maitland) and daughter Beth (Anna Friel), after years of physical and psychological abuse, and rape. They bury him under the patio.

In 1995, Jimmy turns up to the D-Day commemorations dressed in a Gestapo uniform, which is poorly received in the close. He is also accompanied on frequent occasions by his dog Cracker. Jimmy ends up selling drugs instead of taking them. With the money, he buys 10 Brookside Close and moves into the neighbourhood. However, rival dealers target the house in a drive-by shooting, which kills Jackie's cat, and Jimmy decides to quit before anyone got hurt. Jimmy's son-in-law (and partner in crime) Gary Stanlow (Andrew Fillis) is ordered to dispose of the remaining drugs, but he chooses to sell one final stash to one of Jimmy's regular customers, Australian soap star Shane Cochrane. Jimmy is horrified when Gary admits what he had done, as the heroin was uncut, and tries desperately to reach Shane in time, but is too late to stop him fatally overdosing.

A short time after, Jimmy's son "Little Jimmy" (George Christopher) is released from prison and resumes the heroin habit that landed him behind bars. Jimmy and Jackie force him off the drugs by making him go cold turkey, but Little Jimmy still owes money to drug dealers who end up murdering him in November 1996. There is a brief respite for Jimmy and Jackie in July 1997 when they have a third child, William. Jimmy attempts to make a fresh start and wants to become a teacher, but he does so by falsifying certificates with Danny Simpson's (Andrew Butler) help. Jimmy really enjoys the job, but Jackie becomes sick of it after a few months, mainly because Jimmy was really starting to believe his own hype. She reveals his deception at a dinner with two of his fellow teacher colleagues, who are not impressed, and Jimmy is fired afterwards. He later develops manic depression, and begins experiencing hallucinations and delusions. He gets up one morning, convinced he is still a teacher, and arrives at the school. He locks his pupils in his classroom, shakes tables, and starts ranting and screaming. A boy in his class protests and calls him a "weirdo", causing Jimmy to grab him and throw him into a table. Consumed with guilt, he runs out of the classroom and up onto the roof, where he is ready to commit suicide. His daughter Lindsey Corkhill (Claire Sweeney) and neighbour Ray Hilton (Kenneth Cope) hear about this and try to convince him not to kill himself. The police are also informed and rush onto the scene. Jimmy jumps off the roof, but is saved just in time by one of the policemen. After this, he is advised to go to his general practitioner and he put on anti-depressants.

In 2001, he separates from Jackie. After the siege, neighbour Nikki Shadwick (Suzanne Collins) sees Jimmy as a father figure, but her feelings turn to infatuation, and the two sleep together.

Jimmy goes to live with his son-in-law Barry Grant (Paul Usher) and daughter in their mansion in Blaydon, Tyne and Wear.

== Reception ==
Jimmy and Jackie Corkhill received the 2000 British Soap Award for best on-screen partnership. Sullivan was nominated for the 2000 British Soap Award for "Best Actor". In 2003 Sullivan received the Special Achievement Award at the British Soap Awards for his portrayal of the character. Jimmy was selected as one of the "top 100 British soap characters" by industry experts for a poll to be run by What's on TV, with readers able to vote for their favourite character to discover "Who is Soap's greatest Legend?" Virgin Media included Jimmy in their "80s finest" segment and stated: "Jimmy Corkhill arrived on Brookside Close as a wheeler-dealer, but over his 17 years on the show he also showed us the horrors of drugs, and showcased a lot of scary-faced mental illness acting." The Press branded him as one of the serial's most popular characters. Jimmy became noted for wearing a trademark denim shirt, which was won in a competition after the serial stopped airing. Rachel Murphy of the Daily Mirror branded Jimmy a "lovable nutter" and also stated: "Jimmy has ducked and dived through a hilarious and heart-breaking catalogue of crime, drug abuse, mental illness and tragedy". In 2004 Northwest Regional Development Agency branded Jimmy a "lovable rogue" type, a label which Click Liverpool also attributed to the character. In addition, the BBC have stated he is a "much-loved rogue".

The Northern Echo praised the character, stating: "In criminal and activist Jimmy Corkhill, Dean Sullivan has created one of the soap's most memorable characters. He remains one of the few links with the Brookie heyday when it was regularly in the news. After nearly 20 years, he's closely identified by the public with the character, which was originally only scheduled to appear in six episodes." Francesca Babb from All About Soap included Jimmy causing Frank and Tony's deaths in their "most memorable moments" of Brookside feature.

== In popular culture ==
Jimmy was parodied in a segment of Shooting Stars, where he was played by Vic Reeves.
