= Dean Sullivan =

English actor (1955–2023)

- Born: 7 June 1955; Liverpool, England
- Died: 29 November 2023 (aged 68)
- Occupation: Actor
- Years active: 1986–2023

Dean Sullivan (7 June 1955 – 29 November 2023) was an English actor, best known for playing Jimmy Corkhill in the Channel 4 soap opera Brookside between 1986 and 2003.

== Early life ==
Dean Sullivan was born in Liverpool on 7 June 1955. He graduated from Lancaster University with a B.Ed. (Hons.) and was a primary school teacher for six years before becoming an actor. He continued to work as a substitute teacher between roles before Brookside became his full-time job.

== Career ==
Sullivan was a member of Liverpool's Epstein Theatre (at that time named the Neptune Theatre), and appeared in the Willy Russell play Breezeblock Park and the Phil Redmond play Soaplights at the Liverpool Playhouse. Sullivan joined Brookside in February 1986, and remained with the programme until it ended in November 2003, featuring in many of its most popular storylines during that time. In 2003, he won the British Soap Award for Outstanding Achievement for his role as Jimmy.

Sullivan organised "murder weekends" with his company, The Murder Game. In 2001, he appeared on Lily Savage's Blankety Blank. In 2008, he appeared in the sitcom Terry Across the Mersey, and presented a daily show on City Talk 105.9 from the Radio City Tower until May 2009.

The purpose-built Brookside Close, which was created for Brookside, was sold in December 2008. Sullivan had wanted to buy the houses to revive the show, but they were sold to a different buyer. In August 2011, he expressed interest in reprising his role as Jimmy Corkhill in other soap operas.

Sullivan had been due to star in a pantomime until shortly before his death. However, on 17 November 2023, it was announced that his forthcoming role as Fleshcreep in Jack and the Beanstalk at The Atkinson theatre in Southport would be taken over by Mark Paterson.

== Personal life and death ==
In August 2023, Sullivan announced that he had been privately battling prostate cancer since 2018. He died on 29 November 2023, at the age of 68.
