= Kate Fitzgerald =

British television actress (born 1956)

- Born: 3 July 1956 (age 70); Liverpool, Lancashire, England
- Occupation: Actress
- Years active: 1979–present
- Notable work: Brookside (1985–1987, 1989–1990); Coronation Street (2015, 2018–2019); Benidorm (2017–2018)
- Relatives: Angela Walsh (sister)

Kate Fitzgerald (born 3 July 1956) is a British television actress from Liverpool. She came to prominence playing Doreen Corkhill in the soap opera Brookside (1985–1987, 1989–1990), Nancy Tinker in Coronation Street (2015, 2018–2019), and Loretta Chase in Benidorm (2017–2018).

== Education ==
Fitzgerald attended Notre Dame Catholic College girls' school in Liverpool, later graduating from drama school.

== Career ==
Fitzgerald's first appearance on television was in 1979 on ITV Playhouse in the Willy Russell play The Daughters of Albion. Kate went on to star in Russell's Educating Rita at the Liverpool Playhouse in 1981, where she played Rita.

From 1985 to 1990, Kate played the character Doreen Corkhill in the Channel 4 soap opera Brookside. She appeared in Movies 'Til Dawn in 1997, before moving on to ITV television series Peak Practice as Andrew Attwood's sister, Chrissy Booth, for four episodes. In 1999, she portrayed Mrs. Delaney for 2 episodes in Queer as Folk.

In 2004, she starred as Dorothy Potts in the film Under the Mud. In 2014, she played Vera in 2 episodes of Cilla. In 2015, she achieved a lifelong ambition when joining the cast of Coronation Street in a recurring role as Nancy Tinker for 13 episodes from 2015-2019.

In 2017, Fitzgerald starred as Loretta Chase in the ITV Sitcom Benidorm, the eccentric mother of Sheron Dawson (Julie Graham), remaining in the main cast for 17 episodes until 2018.

== Filmography ==
Year	Title	Role	Notes
1997	Movies 'Til Dawn	Kit	
2000	Secret Society	Mrs. Selby	
2002	Dead Drunk	Val	Short film
2006	Under the Mud	Dorothy Potts	

== Television ==
Year	Title	Role	Notes
1979	ITV Playhouse	Sharron	Episode: "The Daughters of Albion"
1984	The Tempest, Act IV	Ariel	Television film
1985–1990	Brookside	Doreen Corkhill	Series regular
1993, 1995, 1997, 2002–2003	The Bill	Rita Garrard; Tricia James; Maria Moss; Lillian Rickman	9 episodes total
1994, 1997	Casualty	June Williamson; Marie Muldowney	2 episodes
1997	The Lakes	Mam Kavanagh	Episode #1.1
1998	Peak Practice	Chrissy Booth	4 episodes
1999	Queer as Folk	Mrs. Delaney	2 episodes
1999	Trial by Fire	Bernadette Featherstone	Television film
2001	Clocking Off	Jess Anderson	Episode: "Ronnie's Story"
2002, 2008, 2012	Doctors	Mary Foley; Aunt May; Aunt Nessa Parkes	3 episodes
2003	Merseybeat	Liz Saunders	Episode: "Angels with Dirty Faces"
2005	The Afternoon Play	Violet	Episode: "The Singing Cactus"
2006	The Street	TV Participant	Episode: "Stan"
2006	Sinchronicity	Evelyn	Episode #1.2
2008, 2010	Holby City	Nerys Davies; Patricia Burns	2 episodes
2014	Cilla	Vera	2 episodes
2015, 2018, 2019	Coronation Street	Nancy Tinker	Recurring role; 13 episodes
2017–2018	Benidorm	Loretta Chase	Main cast; 17 episodes
2024	Until I Kill You	Mrs. Sweeney	Episode: "Love"
