= John McArdle =

English actor (born 1949)

- Born: 16 August 1949 (age 77); Liverpool, Merseyside, England
- Education: East 15 Acting School
- Occupation: Actor
- Spouse: Kathy Jamieson

John McArdle (born 16 August 1949) is an English actor. He is most notable for playing Billy Corkhill in the Channel 4 soap opera Brookside from 1985 to 1990.

In 1996, McArdle co-starred with Helen Mirren in the fifth Prime Suspect story, "Errors of Judgement".

McArdle was the subject of This Is Your Life in 2003 when he was surprised by Michael Aspel on the set of Merseybeat.

In 2006, McArdle portrayed Frank Taylor in an episode of BBC TV's Surviving Disaster that concerned the Munich air disaster of 1958, which Taylor was the only newspaper reporter to survive.

In 2010, McArdle played Christopher Mead's father in Waterloo Road.

He is also a stage actor, seen in Our Country's Good at the Liverpool Playhouse.

He is a patron of the Octagon Theatre in Bolton.

From 2016 to 2017, he appeared in the ITV soap opera Emmerdale as regular character Ronnie Hale. In March 2023, he portrayed Phil Griffiths in an episode of the BBC soap opera Doctors.

In October 2025, McArdle reprised his role of Billy Corkhill in a special Brookside crossover episode with Hollyoaks, to celebrate the 30th anniversary of the latter. He continued to portray the character in two further Hollyoaks episodes.

== Filmography ==
Year	Title	Role	Other notes
1982–1984	Brookside	Mr. P. Todd	5 episodes
1984	Charlie	First Shop Steward	2 episodes
1984	Scully	Teacher	Episode: "#1.3"
1985–1990	Brookside	Billy Corkhill	327 episodes
1985	How We Used to Live	Doctor Wallace	Episode: "1915: Epidemic"
1985	Seaview	Policeman	Episode: "The Godfather"
1985	Fell Tiger	Reporter	Episode: "#1.1"
1986	Screen Two	'Election Countdown' Panel	Episode: "Frankie and Johnnie"
1992	Underbelly	Jack Preston	4 episodes
1992	Thacker	Martin Strickland	TV movie
1992–1994	Firm Friends	Peter Creswell	7 episodes
1993	Gallowglass	Paul Garnet	3 episodes
1993	Spender	Sam Harper	Episode: "Best Friends"
1994	Screen One	Harry	Episode: "Bambino Mio"
1994	The Chief	DC Dave Corbyn	Episodes: "Four and Twenty Blackbirds" and "Strained Relations"
1994	Screen Two	Dilke	Episode: "Skallagrigg"
1994	Cracker	Tom Carter	Episode: "Men Should Weep, Part 1"
1994	Seaforth	Fred Spence	7 episodes
1994	Finney	Louis Souter	3 episodes
1995	Wycliffe	Alex Keir	Episode: "The Trojan Horse"
1995	Rich Deceiver	Malc Freeman	TV movie
1995	Heartbeat	Terry Tinniswood	Episode: "Vigilante"
1996	Kavanagh QC	Simon Lloyd	Episode: "Men of Substance"
1996	And the Beat Goes On	Charlie Woods	8 episodes
1996	Prime Suspect	DCS Ballinger	Episodes: "Errors of Judgement", parts 1 & 2
1996	Throwaways	Spindor	TV movie
1997	The Place of the Dead	Major Ron Foster	TV movie
1997	Born to Run	Eddie Gallagher	Episode: "#1.3"
1997	Casualty	Pete Ellington	Episode: "A Taste of Freedom"
1998	Out of Hours	Dr. Daniel Laing	6 episodes
1999	Playing the Field	Graham	Episode: "#2.3"
1999	City Central	Michael Dennison	Episode: "Paradise Lost"
1999	Holby City	Ken	Episode: "Staying Alive, Part 1"
2000	Peak Practice	Clive Richards	Episode: "Faith, Hope & Love"
2000	Metropolis	Steve Norris	Episodes: "#1.3" and "#1.4"
2000	Where the Heart Is	Eddie Armitage	Episode: "Shifting Sands"
2000	In Defence	DCI Brian Walsh	Episode: "#1.4"
2000	My Fragile Heart	Roy Lavery	2 episodes
2000	There's Only One Jimmy Grimble	Headmaster	
2001	Always and Everyone	Mr. Rogers	Episode: "Med School Educate"
2001	The Cazalets	Tonbridge	6 episodes
2001–2004	Merseybeat	Supt. Jim Oulton	Series 1—4; 38 episodes
2003	Gifted	Steve Moran	TV movie
2004	Casualty@Holby City	Frank Morgan	2 episodes
2004	Dalziel and Pascoe	Matthew Davis	Episode: "The Price of Fame"
2004	Through My Eyes	McAuley	2 episodes
2004	The Afternoon Play	Bob Collins	Episode: "Viva Las Blackpool"
2005	The Bill	Commander Ian Barrett	8 episodes
2005	Heartbeat	Nat Jubb	Episode: "Duty of Care"
2006	Surviving Disaster	Frank Taylor	Episode: "Munich Air Disaster"
2006	Foyle's War	Stan Davies	Episode: "Invasion"
2006	Blue Murder	Colin McAteer	Episode: "The Spartacus Thing"
2007	Mobile	Paul Stoan	Episode: "The Soldier"
2008	Doctors	Les Robson	Episode: "The Front Page"
2009	All the Small Things	Jimmy	6 episodes
2009	U Be Dead	Brian Pemberton	TV movie
2010	Waterloo Road	Oliver Mead	6 episodes
2010	Casualty	Mick Garland	Episode: "Going Solo"
2010	Law & Order: UK	Dan Callaghan	Episode: "Denial"
2010	Doctors	John Fairley	Episode: "A Child Called Moon"
2011	Waking the Dead	Murray Stuart	Episodes: "Solidarity", parts 1 & 2
2011	The Case	Gordon McAllister	4 episodes
2012	Doctors	Clive Royle	Episode: "Fall of a Sparrow"
2012	Vera	Marty	Episode: "A Certain Samaritan"
2012	Holby City	Jock Buchan	Episode: "When Sacha Met Chrissie"
2012	Crime Stories	Bill Jones	Episode: "Jackpot"
2013	New Tricks	Jim Marshall	Episode: "Things Can Only Get Better"
2016–2017	Emmerdale	Ronnie Hale	116 episodes
2023	Doctors	Phil Griffiths	Episode: "Runaway Train"
