= Phil Redmond =

English producer and screenwriter (born 1949)

Sir Phil Redmond CBE
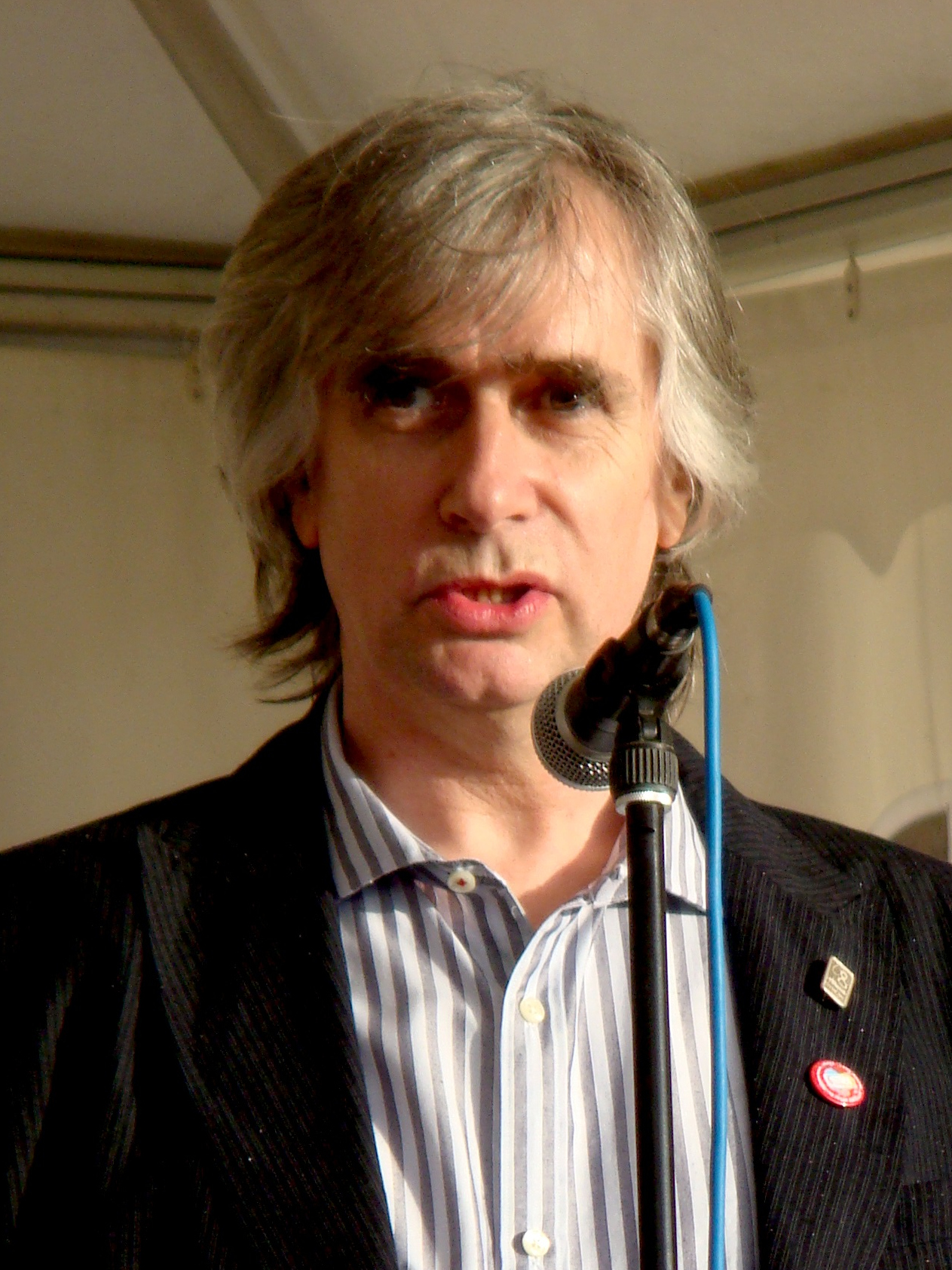
- Redmond in 2008
- Born: 10 June 1949 (age 77); Huyton, Merseyside, England
- Education: University of Liverpool
- Occupations: Television producer, screenwriter
- Spouse: Alexis Redmond
- Writing career
- Period: 1973–present
- Genre: Television
- Notable works: Grange Hill (BBC, 1978–2008); Brookside (Channel 4, 1982–2003); Hollyoaks (Channel 4, since 1995); The Courtroom (Channel 4, 2004)

Sir Philip Redmond (born 10 June 1949) is an English television producer and screenwriter. He is known for creating the television series Grange Hill, Brookside and Hollyoaks.

== Early life and education ==
Redmond was born in Huyton, England. He took the 11-plus and passed, but attended St Kevin's RC School in Northwood, Kirkby (it became All Saints Catholic High School, Kirkby). His mother was a cleaner and his father was a bus driver.

Redmond left school with four O-levels and one A-level and trained to become a quantity surveyor. He studied Sociology at the University of Liverpool.

== Career ==
Redmond wrote episodes for the ITV sitcom Doctor in Charge and children's series The Kids from 47A. He became well known for creating several popular television series such as Grange Hill (BBC One, 1978–2008), for which he based his first ideas on his time at St Kevin's, Brookside (Channel 4, 1982–2003), Rownd a Rownd (S4C, 1995–) and Hollyoaks (Channel 4, 1995–). Redmond also created the daytime legal drama The Courtroom (Channel 4, 2004), which was cancelled after 38 episodes. For over twenty years he also ran his own independent production company, Mersey Television, before selling off the company in 2005. He sought to oust Granada Television in the 1991 ITV franchise auctions, but was not successful.

In 2013, Redmond's autobiography, Mid-Term Report, was published. He released his first novel, Highbridge, in 2016.

== Honours ==
- Ambassador Fellow at Liverpool John Moores University.
- Honorary degree of Doctor of Letters (D.Litt) from the University of Chester (November 2010).
- Chair, National Museums Liverpool and of the UK City of Culture Independent Advisory Panel.
- Commander of the Order of the British Empire (CBE) in the 2004 Birthday Honours for services to drama,
- Knight Bachelor in the 2020 Birthday Honours for services to broadcasting and arts in the regions.

=== Other ===
In February 2012, Redmond declared an interest in running for the role of Elected Mayor of Liverpool.
