= Susannah Morrisey =

Fictional character from Brookside

- Brookside character
- Portrayed by: Karen Drury
- Duration: 1991–1993, 1995–2000
- First appearance: 22 July 1991
- Last appearance: 29 November 2000
- Created by: Phil Redmond
In-universe information
- Other names: Susannah Farnham
- Mother: Daphne Morrisey
- Sisters: Lisa Morrisey
- Husband: Max Farnham (1983–1988, 1998–2000)
- Sons: Matthew Farnham
- Daughters: Emily Farnham; Emma Farnham
- Stepsons: Thomas Farnham; Harry Farnham
- Stepdaughters: Alice Farnham
- Uncles: Teddy

Susannah Morrisey (also Farnham) is a fictional character from the British Channel 4 soap opera Brookside, played by Karen Drury. The character debuted on-screen during the episode broadcast on 22 July 1991. Susannah was created as the ex-wife of established character Max Farnham (Steven Pinder) and writers instantly used her to create problems in Max's marriage to Patricia Farnham (Gabrielle Glaister). Susannah's feud with Patricia and desire to reunite with Max formed the basis of her early storylines. Susannah's initial characterisation was only that of a mean, disgruntled ex-spouse but Drury decided to play her more sweet and snobbish. Susannah's persona allowed writers the versatility to create both tragic and comedic stories for her. Susannah's tragedies were formed via her difficult marriage to Max, family bereavements and poor mental health. Writers later transformed her into a promiscuous and scheming woman which gained her infamy in the British press.

When Drury returned to the series in 1995, writers reunited her with Max and explored the Farnhams running their restaurant business alongside their continued relationship problems. Producers then created dramatic plots for Susannah because Drury was considering leaving Brookside. Writers explored the issues of child bereavement and road safety when they killed off her two children Matthew and Emily in a car crash with Susannah at the wheel. The story featured various repercussions for the character with a decline in her mental health, an attempted suicide and gradual acceptance of their deaths. Series creator Phil Redmond was keen for Brookside to portray the issue of surrogacy because it was heavily featured in the British media at the time. Susannah is told she cannot have any more children and enlists Jacqui Dixon (Alex Fletcher) to become a surrogate mother. Writers complicated the plot with Susannah actually becoming pregnant and later giving birth to a daughter, Emma. This created a long-running feud between Jacqui over the custody of her surrogate son Harry.

Other stories include Max's affair with Faye Spence (Joanne Zorian) and their divorce. Susannah then has affairs with Greg Shadwick (Mark Moraghan) and Darren Roebuck (Timothy Deenihan), and a relationship with Mick Johnson (Louis Emerick). Susannah had fully transformed into a promiscuous and man-eating character. Writers devised a mystery whodunit death storyline to coincide with Drury's departure from the show. The show created five suspects with Max eventually being revealed as the culprit after he pushes her down the stairs. Susannah's legacy became her being regarded as one of Brookside's most iconic and dramatic characters. Her promiscuity gained her a reputation of being a "man-eater" and a "nymphomaniac" in British newspapers. Drury's acting received positive reviews, especially during her tragic stories. Susannah's car crash and her death have been cited as some of the show's most memorable stories by television critics.

== Development ==
=== Backstory and characterisation ===
The character and Drury's casting was announced on 6 June 1991. Judith Moss from the Liverpool Echo reported that Susannah was created as the ex-wife of established character Max Farnham (Steven Pinder) who would create problems for in his marriage with Patricia Farnham (Gabrielle Glaister). In their backstory, Susannah and Max met each other while studying their A levels at sixth form college. They married soon after and both began studying at Liverpool Polytechnic. Susannah discovered that she was pregnant and her parents agreed to subsidise both her and Max. When they purchased their first home together, Susannah became pregnant again which complicated her marriage. Max begins an affair with Patricia and divorces Susannah. He then marries Patricia, who gives birth to his son Thomas (Kieran Warham). Susannah was scorned by Max and following a "bitter divorce" she wanted what she was owed. Max then has to pay Susannah maintenance to contribute to his other children, Matthew (Gareth and Ryan Jones) and Emily's (Victoria Bennett) upbringing. Max worked as a quantity surveyor but the continuous maintenance payments meant they had to settle for a small house on Brookside Close.

Writers initially characterised Susannah as Max's mean ex-wife but Drury decided to change her persona. She told a reporter from the Lancashire Telegraph that the part was originally conceived as "a really horrible ex-wife. Perhaps to make it more interesting, I decided to play her very sweetly. She was very nice, but a terrible snob. Those little subtleties got a bit lost at the end, but I just had to adapt to it." Drury liked Susannah's characterisation and range of stories writers created for her. Drury told Vicky Spavin from the Daily Record that "One minute Susannah is very tragic, the next she's very comic." While often portrayed as a tragic figure, Susannah has at times shown strength and determination to overcome her hardships. She gained viewers affection for her strength in overcoming her children's deaths. She gained admiration for her controlling ways in keeping her adulterous husband, Max at home.

A writer from the official Brookside website profiled that Susannah's "life and fate were to be irrevocably bound up with Max." They noted that despite Max's numerous affairs she was depicted "forever smitten" with him. They added that her "obsession intensified" after Matthew and Emily's deaths and that it was fate that Max brought about her demise.

=== Scheming against Max and Patricia ===
Susannah's initial stories explored her fractious relationships with Max and Patricia. In 1992, Pinder told Geoff Tibballs, author of Brookside – The First Ten Years that Max and Patricia had faced numerous financial issues because of Susannah and the children. Glaister assessed that Patricia had always felt guilty about stealing Max from Susannah. Susannah's introduction occurred via Max's visits with Matthew and Emily. This meant constant contact between Susannah and Max, which leaves Patricia feeling increasingly wary of them. Patricia had begun her relationship from infidelity and she worried that Max could easily have more affairs. Tibballs noted constant on-screen chemistry between Susannah and Max, and that Patricia was aware of this, too, and worried Susannah would win him back. In one scene, Patricia admits that she purposely became pregnant to guarantee that Max would stay with her.

Patricia becomes increasingly threatened by Susannah's presence when Max begins spending more time with her. Patricia refuses to accompany Max to an important Round Table function. Geoffrey Fletcher (Chris Wright) tells Max that attending alone will damage the company's brand image and he asks Susannah to pose as his wife. He keeps the dinner date a secret but Patricia later discovers the truth. Patricia confronts Susannah and sets new terms about his contact with Max. Writers then revealed Susannah's true intentions in the scene, as Susannah claims that she could reconcile her romance with Max any time she chooses to. Susannah then schemes to fool Patricia into thinking Max is sleeping with her. When Patricia works away in London, Susannah answers the Farnham's house phone to upset Patricia. She returns home and confronts Max, who insists Susannah was staying over to care for Emily who was ill. Patricia refuses to believe Max and throws him out of their home. They soon reconcile when Patricia needs Max to support her through her breast cancer diagnosis.

Susannah begins dating Andrew and agrees to move to the United States with him. She informs Max, who threatens legal action to prevent Matthew and Emily leaving with her. She ignores him and moves the family to Florida. Max tracks them down, kidnaps them and returns to Liverpool. Susannah follows them and upon her return sees an opportunity to destroy the Farnham marriage. Tibballs stated that Susannah used the children as a "weapon" against Max, used herself as "bait" and "played on his emotions". Her attempts to seduce Max work and they have sex. Tibballs added that Max "surrendered meekly" to Susannah's charms and Max himself even claimed to have been powerless when faced with Susannah's seduction. Drury later assessed that Susannah had hounded Max and wormed her way back into his affections. Patricia's father David Crosbie (John Burgess) discovers their affair and tells his daughter. Susannah's scheming only worked for a short time. Patricia divorces Max but they soon remarry and have another child together.

When Susannah returns in 1995, she once again resumes her campaign to win back Max. This time she romances Patricia's friend Dil Palmer (Gordon Warnecke). To promote her return, the show's publicity department teased "Max is finding it hard to control his libido, but he's determined to be faithful to Patricia... But how long will it last?" Max was then accused of soliciting prostitutes and arrested. Susannah decides to support him but Patricia ends their marriage and moves to France. Max is found not guilty and Susannah uses the opportunity to reunite with Max. The "kerb-crawling" storyline invoked sympathy from viewers and Brookside producer Mal Young stated it provided scriptwriters an opportunity to "work Susannah back into his affections".

Another reason for reuniting the couple was Glaister's decision to leave the series. When Young learned that Glaister wanted out, he decided that Susannah could easily replace Patricia. Young told author Geoff Tibballs that "for Patricia to storm off and be replaced by Susannah seemed a natural development in Max's complicated love life." Young added that Susannah had previously been a "reactive character" but this allowed her to become a "proactive character" with her own stories rather than just reacting to Max's dramas. When Patricia has an additional cancer scare, Susannah is faced with the prospect of raising her daughter Alice, who has Down syndrome. Susannah cannot commit to such a responsibility, Young added that it further complicated Susannah and Max's relationship. Susannah then secretly buys Max's restaurant and tells him he can have half of the business if they get remarried. Producers also brought back Patricia from France for one last showdown with Susannah and Max. They prioritised Susannah and Patricia's rivalry by broadcasting five episodes in one week to showcase the story's culmination.

=== Car crash, children's death and suicide attempt ===
Drury considered leaving Brookside because she wanted a more dramatic role. Producers then pitched a story in which the Farnham children would be killed off. They informed her the story would last over two years and depict Susannah's recovery from their deaths. Drury thought it was a "wonderful opportunity" and decided to stay. Writers delivered on their promise and the story continued to affect Susannah's entire life thereafter. Drury later told a Southern Daily Echo reporter that "the whole storyline of the children dying lasted about two years. Doing those heavy storyline does affect you a little bit, but you have to learn to shake it off." The scenes play out with Susannah driving home with Emily and Matthew in the backseats of the car. Susannah fails to see an oncoming car and smashes into it. Matthew is ejected out of the front windscreen and Emily is injured in the back. Drury told Steve Clark of the Daily Mirror that Susannah "only takes her eyes off the road for a second". The ordeal is "terrifying" for Susannah because she remains trapped in the driver's seat, unable to help them the entire time. The aftermath of the crash played out over the following five episodes. Prior to the accident, Susannah drank alcohol within the safe limits. This show's up on a breathalyser test and Susannah is informed that she may be prosecuted. When the production team filmed the scenes, actual emergency services were hired to help add realism. Drury said their presence made the stunt feel "realistic" and "very eerie". In one scene Drury filmed Susannah trapped in the car surrounded by fire crews and paramedics. She believed that everyone involved left with the notion that they would practise better road safety.

After Matthew and Emily die, Drury explained that Susannah feels at fault and even blames Max. The character is "completely broken" and unsure of whether she can rebuild her life. She transforms into a more vulnerable character. Drury added that Susannah is also aware Max has another family with Patricia and fears he will seeks solace with her and the children. The immediate aftermath tests Susannah's strength as she becomes a "mental and physical wreck". She believed that while Susannah is "strong" she has to decide whether or not she wants to live without her children. Drury told the Daily Mirror's Lucky Rock that she "loved" the emotional story but "relished" its "lighter moments". Writers were loath to portray a quick solution to Susannah's recovery. Drury explained that "she won't ever get over it but she'll learn to live with it. It would be horrid to pretend they'd never had children. But people don't lose their personalities and that's going to be explored." She added that Susannah had overcome her suicidal feelings. The story had a positive reception from viewers and resonated with those who had a shared experience of child loss. Drury revealed that she received countless letters from bereaved parents. Drury explained that Susannah's story was "good" and "cathartic" because it helped viewers who shared her pain.

=== Surrogacy ===
"I think people actually quite admire Susannah for her guts, and for the way she controls her husband Max. Controlling a man in the way that Susannah does is something that eludes most women and they admire someone that can do it! Also, more seriously, I think they feel sorry for her, because she lost her two children in a car crash. People forgive her for trying to do whatever she can to get another family around her."

— Karen Drury discussing viewer support for Susannah's surrogacy story. (1998)

Writers made the character even more tragic when they made her unable to have more children. Susannah suffers an infection that leaves her unable to conceive. They depicted Susannah becoming obsessed with the idea of adoption. Drury believed that Susannah was "clutching at straws" and on the verge of "deep depression". She added that Susannah is unable to recognise her behaviour because she is "obsessed" with having more children. Susannah's quest to have more children begins to alienate Max. Drury said that Susannah neglects Max because her grief consumes her. Susannah believes Max is just trying to please her and he has to reassure Susannah that he wants more children.

In 1997, Brookside explored the issue of surrogacy. Writers had pitched the idea in story meetings and when the issue became more news worthy, the story was brought forward. Series creator Phil Redmond told Peter Grant of the Liverpool Echo that "in our long-term planning meeting there was a surrogate storyline in place, but with the recent developments in the news about surrogacy we decide to re-examine it." He added that Susannah will discover she cannot have any more children and seek out a surrogate mother. Susannah manages to convince Jacqui Dixon (Alex Fletcher) to become a surrogate mother and hand over the child once born. They also agree to compensate Jacqui with money. Drury expected to receive a backlash from viewers because her character becomes to fixated on creating a new family. To her surprise, the story was successful and many applauded Susannah's strength as she rebuilt her life after the death of her children. Drury stated that people "admire" Susannah for her "guts" and controlling her marriage. They forgive Susannah's determination because they sympathise with her child loss. She added that viewers realised Jacqui is not innocent in the story because she is accepting money and treating surrogacy as a business transaction.

In 1999, writers used the character to highlight the social issue of breastfeeding in public. Brookside worked with children's charity UNICEF to create an authentic story. Susannah is portrayed breastfeeding Emma inside Bar Brookie, which offends an older man and he complains about Susannah's behaviour. UNICEF's Victoria Rae stated that the United Kingdom had one of the lowest breastfeeding rates in the world. Rae praised Brookside for sending a "positive message" to British mothers that they have the right to breastfeed when necessary regardless of the location.

=== Affair with Greg Shadwick ===
After the breakdown of her marriage to Max and his departure, writers created an affair story with married man Greg Shadwick (Mark Moraghan). Drury explained that "the build up to the affair with Greg was soul-searching, but it was also very funny." Greg is married to Margi Shadwick (Bernadette Foley) and has three children Nikki Shadwick (Suzanne Collins), Emily Shadwick (Jennifer Ellison) and Jason Shadwick (Vincent Price). Those involved in the storyline sought to make their passion explicit. Drury and Moraghan both made kissing sounds which were recorded in a dubbing booth and added to scenes. Drury also revealed "we were just very careful to make it as sexy as we could."

In July 1999, it was revealed that producers had axed the characters of Greg, Margi and Jason. On-screen, Susannah and Greg were still having an affair. Moraghan was shocked and asked Redmond to reconsider. Moraghan believed that writers were planning a long-term future between Susannah and Greg because of the intensity of their affair. Redmond had planned a large stunt to outdo the shop explosions that had been broadcast the previous year and decided to kill Greg off.

On-screen, the story plays out at the opening of the Millennium Club. Susannah and Greg have sex in the shower when a bomb explodes inside the club. The explosion destroys the club and a naked Susannah and Greg are discovered together. The explosion kills Greg, while Susannah is pulled from the wreckage alive. Writers created a feud between Emily and Susannah. Emily blames her for Greg's death and enlists the help of Tim O'Leary (Philip Olivier) to steal Susannah's car and set fire to it. Emily then posts cards to Susannah's neighbours claiming that she is a prostitute. Emily then arranges for animal manure to be dumped into Susannah front garden.

=== Departure and death ===
When Pinder decided to leave Brookside in 1998, Drury worried that Susannah would also be written out. She met series creator Phil Redmond who assured her that the character would remain in the show. Writers created another infidelity plot for Max to aid his departure. Max begins an affair with restaurant worker Faye Spence (Joanne Zorian). Drury told a reporter from the Irish Independent that working on Brookside without Pinder would be "awful" and she would "miss him like mad". On-screen, Susannah becomes suspicious of Max having an affair. Susannah goes to confront Faye, and catches her in a passionate clinch with Max. Pinder reprised the role the following year at the request of Brookside producers. They promised him that Max would be written differently to his prior stint. During his break, writers had evolved Susannah into a character with her own stories, such as the Shadwick affair. Drury believed that Susannah would not be happy with Max's return. She explained to Spavin (Daily Record) that "Susannah is bitter. Before she was just grief-stricken after losing her children and she moaned a lot – she was struggling a lot with two new babies. Then she found out about Faye." She added that Susannah would not remain angry with Max but they could never return to how they once were. Susannah ultimately becomes more accepting of Max for the sake of her children. Pinder added "perhaps Max and Susannah are a bit stuck together."

In 2000, it was announced that Drury would be leaving the role; she had told producers of her departure a year before the announcement. She told Will Scott from Newsquest that when she informed producers of her decision to leave, they convinced her to stay another year. This allowed writers to create a dramatic exit story for Susannah. One aspect of her decision to leave was a long commute to work. Drury had to travel daily from her homes in London and Stratford-upon-Avon to the Brookside set, which is based in Liverpool. Drury believed that Susannah's stories "went a bit daft" after her many ordeals. In addition, she told Maxine Gordon from The Press that "I felt as a character, Susannah has gone as far as she can go." Producers decided to kill the character off in a mystery whodunit storyline. Drury was surprised they wanted to kill her off because she had always viewed Susannah as "a survivor". She told Gordon that "she has gone through so much, I never thought they would do something horrible to her." Despite her shock, she was happy to receive such as dramatic exit storyline. Drury described it as "the most brutal story line to leave on" and she was "quite excited" when she read her final scripts because "there were a lot of twists and turns."

In the build-up to her departure, the show's publicity team revealed that there would be five suspects involved in her death. They were Max, Darren Roebuck (Timothy Deenihan), Mick Johnson (Louis Emerick), Jacqui Dixon and Emily Shadwick. Susannah had made enemies out of all these characters in the months and years prior to her death. The culprit was not revealed in spoilers prior to broadcasts. The week's episodes marked the show's eighteenth anniversary. They were stylised as an episodic block of flashbacks showcasing the events of the night that Susannah dies. Each episode featured one suspect visiting Susannah at her home for a showdown. Each visit included the suspects becoming violent after haranguing her. Drury likened the story to "revenge tragedy" and said "a lot of people on the close had a motive." Filming Susannah's departure affected Drury personally; she later said that she "had nightmares" because of the verbal and violent altercations of the character's final week. Three different endings for Susannah were filmed. Unlike other soap opera "whodunit" stories, producers chose not to prolong revealing the culprit. The whodunit mystery was solved during a special hour long edition of Brookside, which was broadcast on 8 November 2000. Max was revealed as the culprit after he pushed her down some stairs during an argument. The story concluded when the police decided that Susannah's case was an accidental death. After her departure, Drury stated "I did enjoy it. It was wonderful. There was a lot of comedy as well as tragedy, especially between Susannah and Max."

== Reception ==
=== Characterisation and stories ===
For her portrayal of Susannah, Drury was nominated in the "Best Actress" category at the 1998 Inside Soap Awards. Drury won the "Best Exit" accolade at the 2001 Inside Soap Awards ceremony. In 2006, Susannah's car crash and children's deaths was voted as one of soap opera's most emotional death stories by readers of Radio Times. Katy Brent from Closer compiled a list of Brookside's most memorable moments. She included Susannah's car crash as a memorable stunt, Susannah and Emily's sparring as a memorable feud and Susannah's death as a memorable whodunnit mystery. A writer from The Guide Liverpool named Susannah's death as one of the show's top ten stories. Lorna Hughes from the Liverpool Echo included Susannah and Greg in their list of Brookside's most memorable couples. She added "Their steamy affair was probably most memorable for how it came to an end – but what a way to finish things." Hughes later named Susannah's death as one of the show's most famous and memorable stories. In 2003, Frances Traynor from the Daily Record named Susannah's crash that killed her children, her argument with Max and her subsequent death some of the show's "most controversial plotlines". An Evening Standard writer praised Drury's "excellent acting" during Susannah's car crash storyline. Dominic Moffitt from the Liverpool Echo branded the car crash as Susannah's "most controversial moment".

Susannah's constant dramatic stories made her one of the show's most popular characters. Maxine Gordon (The Press) named Susannah as one of Brookside's "most popular characters". She opined that Susannah had endured unforgettable trauma, "gripping storylines". Of her departure, Gordon branded it a "gory exit" and added "as endings go, it couldn't be more dramatic." Vicky Spavin (Daily Record) stated that Drury was "kept on her toes" with the "gamut of emotions and powerful storylines" writers conjured up over two years. A writer from The Bolton News branded her the "mum and man eater Susannah Farnham". A writer from the Lancashire Telegraph praised Drury's performances as Susannah. They opined that "Karen managed to inspire viewers to feel both hate and affection for her character during her time on Brookside." They added she "certainly ran through the whole gamut of emotions as Brookside's mercurial femme fatale " A Southern Daily Echo reporter branded her a "tragic" character and thought Drury was given "some particularly tough storylines". A writer from Manchester Evening News called her a "Brookie favourite". A Westmorland Gazette reporter described Susannah's role in the show as "posh-on-the-street" and a "repressed housewife". They described her time on the show as "eventful". A Coventry Telegraph journalist wrote that she was a "Brookside favourite" and her "death has gripped soap fans". Mark Lawson from The Guardian branded Susannah's death as one of the show's "last compelling storylines".

Other television critics disliked the character because of her snobbery. The Guardian's Tina Ogle was not impressed with the car crash storyline. They scathed that the "casual killing" of Matthew and Emily "marked the beginning of the end" of the show itself. Fellow Guardian critic Jim Shelley named her "the poshest snob in the series". Shelley also branded her "a pouting (panting) big-chested blonde" and was happy that she returned to "torment" Max. They called Susannah and Patricia's feud "the battle of the blondes" and a "Bouquet of Barbed Wire-style sub-plot that was "side tracked" by other stories. Polly Vernon, also from The Guardian believed that fictional characters representing the British middle-class, such as Susannah and Max do not make good television. Another critic declared that while Susannah and Greg were a "charming couple", their relationship has "quickly descended into rather desperate innuendo – like Carry on Plumbing." Tony Stewart from the Daily Mirror accused the character of being empty headed. Of Susannah's sanity, Terry Ramsey from the Evening Standard said that she was "madder than we thought" and a "fruitcake as usual", while another branded her "quite mad but irresistible" and that Max was playing "Igor to her Frankenstein". Off-screen, Drury became the target of a hate mail campaign orchestrated by a female viewer from Scotland. Drury received monthly letters threatening to kill her.

=== Promiscuity ===
Susannah's promiscuous behaviour and debauchery has earned her clout as a "man-eater". The Press' Gordon believed she had transformed into the "Close man-eater". A writer from The Northern Echo assessed that the "man-eating character has munched her way through most of the male population of Brookside Close." A journalist from The Herald accused the character of "wickedly two-timing" Mick and branded her the "inconstant upper-crust sex-pot". The Daily Mirror's Hilary Kingsley branded her "the man-eater of the Close" and was unsure whether she should "condemn or sympathise" with Susannah. Of her promiscuity, Kingsley remarked: "I hate her simpering, but I can see that for a middleclass woman of some sophistication, forced to live in shellsuit land with a load of people who hate her, a diverting hobby would be essential." On Susannah's treatment of Darren, Kingsley added that "Susannah behaves appallingly and it's great fun." Another Daily Mirror critic insulted Susannah's sexuality by branding her the "milkman of the year" because she had "done the rounds in the Close".

Susannah's dissipated living confused the Daily Record's Merle Brown. In her television column, Brown questioned "what is it with Susannah Morrissey? She just can't keep her hands off the men in Brookside Close, can she? Who can keep up with Susannah these days? And who's next?" She branded Susannah and Greg's affair as a "rubbish" storyline. The Daily Mirror's Stewart called her "the whore next door" who "wheedled" her way into Victoria's life to steal her man. Stewart added it was "something Susannah does with amazing regularity – especially when the coast's clear". Daily Record's Tim Randall scathed "the woman is obsessed with the doc and doesn't care who she hurts in the process – Mick, Max, Jacqui. If she doesn't watch out she'll be getting herself murdered". Moira Martingale (Birmingham Post) branded Susannah a "Brookside siren" and of her death she opined that "sexually adventurous women always pay the ultimate price in soaps". Anne-Marie O'Connor from the Enniscorthy Guardian assessed that "Susannah Morrisey is one shrewd-operator. I mean the conniving two-timer can talk her way out of anything" with a "butter-wouldn't-melt-in-my-mouth expression".

Susannah's sexual escapades received ongoing coverage from television critics working for the Evening Standard and The Guardian. Nancy Banks-Smith, who works for the latter publication, wrote that Susannah had "blonde poshness" and compared her to the American soap opera character Sue Ellen Ewing (Linda Gray). She thought Susannah was so sexual that "if she calmed down a bit [she] would be a nymphomaniac". Banks-Smith also quipped that Susannah "certainly put the pussy amongst the pigeons". Gareth McLean of The Guardian wrote that Susannah's death was a "cruel fate" but joked that the character "spent so much of her life on her back". McLean added that Susannah "was starting to make a favourable impression on us - as a lying, cheating, fine wine drinking nympho." Another Guardian critic labelled her the show's "classiest harlot", "desperate and pathetic" and likely to open an escort agency. Geoffrey Phillips from the Evening Standard branded Susannah a "splendidly manipulative five star bitch". Phillips wrote that Susannah "turned up the heat" and "Max is like linguini in her hands". Referencing her scheming, he opined that stronger men than Max would have fallen for her sexual ploys. Phillips also enjoyed Susannah and Greg's affair, stating: "the Greg-Susannah adultery decathlon is lots more fun than the World Athletics Championships". In another review, he expressed his disappointment with their affair ending, stating it was "a pity, it has been more thrilling than a feud defying romance". Another television critic from the publication opined that "Susannah has been quite a stern sexual task-mistress and Max deserves a medal for his willingness to comply." Melanie Henderson from the Evening Express observed that Susannah was Max's "nymphomaniac ex" always in "hot pursuit" of him.
