= Sinbad (Brookside) =

Fictional character from Brookside and Hollyoaks

- Brookside and Hollyoaks character
- Portrayed by: Michael Starke
- Duration: 1984–1985, 1987–2000, 2021, 2023–2026
- First appearance: 18 September 1984 (Brookside); 3 June 2021 (Hollyoaks)
- Last appearance: 6 October 2000 (Brookside); 21 January 2026 (Hollyoaks)
- Created by: Jimmy McGovern
- Introduced by: Phil Redmond
- Spin-off appearances: Brookside: The Lost Weekend (1997); Brookside: Friday the 13th (1998)
In-universe information
- Other names: Thomas Sweeney; Benny
- Occupation: Window cleaner Shopkeeper; Taxi driver
- Father: Figgy
- Mother: Ruth Sweeney
- Sisters: 1
- Daughters: Ruth Sweeney Jr
- Grandmothers: Olive Sweeney
- Uncles: Jake

Thomas Sweeney, commonly known as Sinbad, is a fictional character from the British Channel 4 soap operas Brookside and Hollyoaks, played by Michael Starke. The character debuted on-screen during the episode broadcast on 18 September 1984. Sinbad was originally only supposed to feature in a couple of episodes but continued to appear on a recurring basis until Starke was promoted to the show's regular cast in 1990. Starke began appearing in fellow soap opera, Hollyoaks, playing a taxi driver named Benny and appeared in the series between 2021 and 2024. Starke reprised his role as Sinbad for a 2025 Brookside and Hollyoaks cross-over episode, in which his character was revealed to be actually Sinbad under an alias. Starke continued to appears in Hollyoaks during 2026 episodes.

== Casting ==
Starke joined the cast in 1984. Discussing his first appearance in Brookside Starke recalled he did not have "a clue what was going on, I knew nothing about television and I think it showed." Starke had previously worked as an extra on the show. There he became acquainted with a Brookside writer, Jimmy McGovern who asked him to play a character he had created named Sinbad. The character was only intended to be a small part featuring in a few episodes. Producers kept Starke as part of the show's recurring cast and he continued in the role for five years until he decided he wanted better job security. Starke approached the show's producer Vanessa Whitburn with the request of a full-time contract. She did not want to lose Sinbad from the show and gave him a six-month contract. When Mal Young became producer in 1990 he decided to promote the show's regular cast and gave Starke his first year-long contract.

== Development ==
Writers originally wanted to call the character "Popeye" but later settled on Sinbad. Starke told Johnathon Hughes from Digital Spy that "the nickname was an old scouse mickey take, a window cleaner who doesn't do the corners is given a nautical name as the windows look like portholes." Starke discussed the role with actual window cleaners who offered him tips on how to make Sinbad's profession appear authentic. Starke explained "[they] told me to 'crack my scrim' to make it authentic, which means flicking the shammy leather like a whip." He followed their advice in a scene and a whiplash sound was dubbed over the scene. Starke branded the scene "hilarious", adding that the character "was a more light-hearted presence in those early days and slotted in nicely." In June 1996, Channel 4 released a book about the character called Sinbad's Scrapbook: Secrets of a Window Cleaner.

In 2021, Starke joined the cast of fellow British soap opera, Hollyoaks, playing a taxi driver known as "Benny" who "witnesses some interesting conversations." The character added levity to other characters scenes and Starke played the role again in 2023 episodes. In 2024, Benny and the character Donny Clark (Louis Emerick) were featured in scenes together. Emerick had previously played Sinbad's friend, Mick Johnson in Brookside.

In September 2025, it was confirmed that Starke had reprised the role of Sinbad as part of a Brookside and Hollyoaks cross-over episode to commemorate the latter's thirtieth anniversary celebrations. Harriet Mitchell from Digital Spy noted that Starke had been appearing as the taxi driver but it was unconfirmed whether he was playing the same or two different characters. Starke recalled having a sleepless night prior to filming the episode. He added that a chatty atmosphere on-set when the former Brookside cast members were reunited and the director "had to keep us in line". The episode was broadcast on 22 October 2025, in which Starke's taxi driver character was revealed to be Sinbad and the character, Donny was revealed to be Brookside's Mick. In the story, Sinbad helped connect the two show's together in a shared-universe, with Sinbad taking Mick back to Brookside Close. Once there, Sinbad also reconnected with his old friends, Tim O'Leary (Philip Olivier) and Nikki Shadwick (Suzanne Collins). In another scene, Sinbad picks up a taxi fare on Brookside Close, a passenger played by Phil Redmond in a cameo appearance. Starke reprised the role again and Sinbad returned to Hollyoaks in January 2026. His return was announced alongside Olivier and Collins' returns, who play as Tim and Nikki respectively.

== Storylines ==
Sinbad was first introduced into the soap in September 1984, two years after the programme began. The character was introduced as a window cleaner and friend of Edna Cross (Betty Alberge), who would place bets on horse races for her behind her husband Harry's (Bill Dean) back. Aside from window cleaning, Sinbad took sidelines in many illegitimate deals. Over Christmas 1984 he was seen with 'Trevor the turkey', selling it for £10, and then on delivery producing a live turkey knowing that residents including Sheila Grant (Sue Johnston) and Paul Collins (Jim Wiggins) would be too sensitive to kill it, thus keeping the deposit for himself. He later quipped that this was Trevor's third year of doing it. The character was a long-time friend and associate of Jimmy Corkhill (Dean Sullivan). His nickname derived from his window-cleaning days and his reluctance to clean into the corners of the windows, instead cleaning a porthole-shape in the centre of the glass. For several years the character was billed simply as 'Sinbad'.

Although originally a window cleaner, after selling No 10 Sinbad invested the money into a shop on Brookside Parade selling used kitchen appliances. The shop was called T.H.E. Sweeney, from the character's initials and also referencing the 1970s ITV police drama. While working he met Carmel O’Leary (Carol Connor). Carmel's youngest son, Tim - better known as Tinhead - resented the pair of them becoming so close and tried to upset their relationship the best he could. While running his shop, Sinbad sold a gas cooker to Ron Dixon (Vince Earl), who installed it himself, despite having little aptitude towards gas installation, and the resulting explosion caused great damage to Brookside Parade, paralysing Carmel's eldest son Ben (Simon Paul). Unable to forgive Sinbad for turning a blind eye to Ron's unqualified installation, Carmel ended their relationship. Tim hated Sinbad for a long time following this, to the point where he tried to run him over in his car, causing the car to drive into a nearby river with Tim inside, and he was saved from drowning by Sinbad. Following a talk with Ben, Tim decided to forgive Sinbad and the two would become close over the years.

After the demise of Sinbad's business, his friend Mick Johnson (Louis Emerick) gave him a job at the fish and chip shop, 'Chips with Everything'. This job came to an end shortly after Sinbad sold Ron Dixon a stale pie, after which Ron made a complaint a health inspector who began investigating a local outbreak of food poisoning. Mick confessed that his shop had sold stale food; however, it was discovered the shop was not the source of the outbreak, but Mick was reported regardless. After the report, Mick was fined and he closed the shop.

Later on a gang of racists visited the area and attacked Mick, before turning on Sinbad after he tried to intervene. The attack left him partially deaf. Sinbad struggled to cope with his injuries and left a job interview after his prospective employer treated him in a condescending manner. After being invited to attend a school for deaf children, Sinbad enjoyed his time there and befriended a boy named Andrew. Sinbad also became friends with Andrew's foster mother Barbara, however her other foster son Kevin resented Sinbad's presence. When Sinbad was forced to cancel a day out, Kevin took advantage of Andrew's disappointment and manipulated him into accusing Sinbad of sexual abuse, accusations which Barbara believed. Sinbad was questioned by police and released without charge, but was arrested when child pornography was found on the computer that he was the main user of, the offending pictures having been accidentally downloaded by Tim and Emily Shadwick (Jennifer Ellison). The police would not believe them when they attempted to confess, and as news of the allegations filtered around the Close, several neighbours automatically assumed Sinbad was guilty. Although Mick initially believed Sinbad, seeds of doubt were planted in his mind to the point where he asked his son Leo (Steven Cole) if Sinbad had ever touched him, and Sinbad felt betrayed when he heard about this. Eventually Sinbad's friend Rachel Jordache (Tiffany Chapman) realised that Kevin was, like her, a victim of abuse and talked to him about her own experiences. Kevin confessed that he had made Andrew make up the allegations and told the truth to the police; he had been abused by his birth mother's husband in the past, which his birth mother didn't believe. Although Sinbad's innocence was proven, his neighbours were slow to apologise and Sinbad decided he had no future on the Close. When Barbara asked him if he wanted to move in with her and the boys, he accepted and after saying a fond farewell to Rachel left Brookside Close for a new start.

== Reception ==
A writer from The Observer branded Sinbad "Brookside's most loveable character, a window cleaner turned murder accomplice. He built the patio over Trevor Jordache's (Bryan Murray) grave." Matthew Bayliss from The Guardian believed Sinbad's deafness story lacked realism and criticised the show's portrayal. Bayliss complained that Sinbad discussing the issue with his friends Mick and Jimmy lacked emotion. They added that "they cannot delve into the emotional undertow of sudden deafness and only show it as something that makes conversations tedious." A writer from The Guardian opined that Sinbad had a split personality, difficulty finishing relationships and "tries to be everyone's friend." They observed his protection of girlfriend Mandy (Sandra Maitland) after Trevor's murder as being problematic, adding that "his willingness to please borders on the pathological" The writer concluded that Sinbad would have benefited from long-term psychotherapy. The Guardian critic Jim Shelley believed that there were many reasons to stop watching Brookside. He stated that one reason to quit was "Sinbad nearly having his legs sawn off and now losing his hearing so that he says 'you what?' even more than he did before." Lorna Hughes from the Liverpool Echo said that Brookside was known for its controversial stories. However she believed that Sinbad being accused of child abuse and his rivalry with Carl were less well remembered storylines. An Inside Soap reporter included Sinbad in a feature profiling soap opera characters with odd names. They noted that "while they may have perfectly ordinary real names, Liverpudlians can't resist a good nickname. Don't forget Gizmo, Ducksie, Sizzler, Bumper and Tinhead too!"

A Soaplife writer included Sinbad's marriage proposal to Marcia at Goodison Park, in their "top 10 proposals" feature. Another Soaplife writer stated Sinbad's was "everyone's favourite window cleaner" whose "romantic track record was one of the most dismal in soapland." They branded Marcia "the woman of his dreams" and his marriage proposal on the scoreboard of a football match an "unusual venue". They noted it was plot was "charged with romance" and "sadly" the marriage never happened. They concluded that the proposal was "one of the most memorable and popular in the soap's history." Paul Brooks from the magazine included Sinbad and Marcia in his list of "dream lovers". He assessed that Sinbad was "the eternal gooseberry" until he met Marcia. He added that Sinbad "hasn't had much luck since" he broke up with Marcia.
