= Tim O'Leary =

Fictional character from Brookside

- Brookside and Hollyoaks character
- Portrayed by: Philip Olivier
- Duration: 1996–2003, 2025–2026
- First appearance: 22 May 1996 (Brookside); 22 October 2025 (Hollyoaks)
- Last appearance: 4 November 2003 (Brookside); 25 February 2026 (Hollyoaks)
- Created by: Phil Redmond
- Spin-off appearances: Brookside: Unfinished Business (2003)
- Crossover appearances: Hollyoaks (2025)
In-universe information
- Other names: Tinhead; Timothy O'Leary
- Mother: Carmel O'Leary
- Brothers: Ben O'Leary
- Sisters: Melanie O'Leary
- Wife: Emily Shadwick (2001–2003)

Tim "Tinhead" O'Leary is a fictional character from the British Channel 4 soap opera's Brookside and Hollyoaks, played by Philip Olivier. The character debuted on-screen during the episode broadcast on 22 May 1996. Tim remained on-screen until the final episode of the series in 2003. Tim subsequently appeared in a video spin-off, Brookside: Unfinished Business. Olivier returned as Tim in a 2025 Brookside and Hollyoaks crossover episode as part of latter series’ thirtieth Anniversary. Olivier continued to appear in the role during Hollyoaks episodes broadcast in January 2026 when the show had him enter into a relationship with Liberty Savage (Jessamy Stoddart) as well as having links to gangster character Warren Fox (Jamie Lomas).

== Development ==
In his early years, Tim was portrayed as a "bad lad" and school bully. Tim dislikes Danny Simpson (Andrew Butler) because he is a snob and bullies him. He forms a friendship with Leo Johnson (Steven Cole) but becomes a bad influence on him. Tim begins to commit petty crimes such as breaking into the Simpson's house and stealing a computer. He then hides a load of stolen alcopops at the local youth group. Jimmy Corkhill (Dean Sullivan) identifies Tim as the culprit but decides to help him avoid being caught by the police. Tim's bad behaviour eventually leads to his expulsion from school, despite his mother works at the local school as a governor. Writers continued to use Jimmy in transforming Tim's character and he is portrayed investing more time trying to correct Tim's wayward behaviour. He offers Tim work delivering pizzas but is shocked to discover he has been overcharging customers for their meal. Jimmy's wife Jackie Corkhill (Sue Jenkins) tries to discourage him from helping Tim anymore. Jimmy ignores her wishes because he does not want Tim to end up like his son Little Jimmy Corkhill (George Christopher).

A writer from the show's official website described Tim as being "the cause of much consternation" for his neighbours "as he stomped around with unchecked bravado." It was "inevitable" that Tim's "outlandish behaviour" got him into trouble with the law. However, writers used Sinbad Sweeney as a father figure for Tim and with his guidance Tim became "more settled and mature". Writers later paired Tim with Emily Shadwick (Jennifer Ellison), who led Tim back into his old ways. Tim's "resistance to Emily's feminine wiles is practically non existent". His involvement with Emily ultimately ends up with Tim being sent to prison. In 2002, Olivier stated "it's fun playing a bad lad". He added that he was nothing like his character because "Tim is a lot more daring and jumps before he thinks."

Olivier also played the role in a direct to DVD spin-off, titled Brookside: Unfinished Business. The spin-off was released following Brookside's finale and focuses on Tim and Steve's rivalry with Terry Gibson (Greg Milburn). In the story, Terry lures Tim and Steve to a woodland hideaway for a violent showdown.

On 1 September 2025, it was announced that Olivier had reprised her role for a Brookside and Hollyoaks crossover episode as part of latter's 30th Anniversary. Of his return, Olivier stated that it was "a delight and surprise" to be asked to reprise the role and would "relish returning" to Brookside Close. He added that he would not have believed at aged fifteen, when he joined the cast, that people would still call him "Tinhead" thirty years later. The episode was broadcast on 22 October 2025 and featured Tim on-screen with his old neighbours, Nikki Shadwick (Suzanne Collins) and Sinbad (Michael Starke). Olivier reprised the role again and Tim returned to Hollyoaks in January 2026. His return was announced alongside Suzanne Collins and Starke, who play Nikki and Sinbad respectively. Writers paired Tim in a new relationship storyline with the established Hollyoaks character, Liberty Savage (Jessamy Stoddart). Though it was revealed that Tim would have an "ulterior motive" for being in Chester.

== Storylines ==
=== 1996-2003: Brookside Years ===
"Tinhead" made his first appearance in Brookside as a school bully at Brookside Comprehensive in 1996. Danny Simpson (Andrew Butler) was Tinhead's main target, as he tried to bully him into helping him with his schoolwork. Tinhead was the leader of a gang of boys who continued to terrorise other pupils despite protests made to the head teacher by their parents. Later Danny gave Tinhead some schoolwork, knowing that he was going to take the credit for it, but Danny deliberately made the project complete nonsense so Tinhead was made to look a fool in front of his classmates. Tinhead decided to teach Danny a lesson, so after school he chased Danny and his mate Leo intending to give Danny a good beating, but when he escaped it was Leo who was left battered and bruised. Leo tried later to become part of Tinhead's gang by helping him steal a computer from the Simpsons' house on Brookside Close. Mick (Louis Emerick), Leo's father, tried to get Tinhead expelled from school for bullying, but came across an unexpected problem when he discovered that Tinhead's mother Carmel O'Leary (Carol Connor) was one of the school governors. Carmel refused to believe that her son was the ring leader of the gang of bullies.

Sinbad later became involved in a relationship with Carmel and did his best to help her to try to get Tinhead to change his ways. Tinhead had other ideas, and took every opportunity to try and cause trouble between them. Jimmy also had a run in with Tinhead when he discovered that he was responsible for bringing alcohol into the youth club .

As tension in the O'Leary house continued to mount with Tinhead and Sinbad still at loggerheads, Tinhead left home having decided to squat in the flat above Mick Johnson's Pizza Parlor. While there, he thought he could make some easy money by selling the washing machine that was in the flat. Tinhead's plan backfired when he tried to remove the machine without turning off the water supply which resulted in him flooding the flat and causing extensive damage to Mick's shop below. Both Mick and Sinbad suspected that Tinhead was involved, but Carmel refused to believe he was the culprit. In an effort to make Tinhead a more responsible person Sinbad convinced David Crosbie (John Burgess) to give him a job at the petrol station, but it's not long before Tinhead, who resented being made to work, caused trouble when he put diesel in Ron Dixon (Vince Earl)'s petrol car.

Tinhead only started to see the error of his ways when he nearly killed his younger sister, Melanie (Elizabeth Lovelady). While playing with fireworks he caused a lorry to swerve, and crash into his house where Melanie was sitting watching television; luckily, she was not badly hurt. After this incident Tinhead had a change of attitude, and with encouragement from Sinbad, tried to join the Army. Tinhead passed the entrance interview and test with flying colours and really looked forward to life in the army, but was very disappointed when he arrived at the training camp only to be told that he could not join the Army after all because of a problem with his hearing. After this setback Tinhead refused to go out the for weeks feeling very dejected, until he found employment at a builders yard. It was not long before he was up to his old tricks, making money by selling building materials direct to customers and pocketing the cash.

The bad feeling between Tinhead and Sinbad got worse after Sinbad was found to be partly responsible for an explosion at Brookside Parade, which resulted in Tinhead's brother Ben (Simon Paul) being crippled for life. Despite Ben not blaming Sinbad for his injuries, Tinhead could not forgive him and started to seek revenge. After trying unsuccessfully to run him down in a stolen car, Tinhead eventually corners Sinbad near the edge of a lake with nowhere to run. Tinhead bore down on him in the car, but Sinbad jumps out the way just in time. Unable to stop, Tinhead ends up in the lake and the car sinks out of sight. Sinbad dives in the lake and pulls Tinhead clear of the car. Even after Sinbad had saved his life, Tinhead still refused to be friends until Ben finally managed to convince him that he should not blame Sinbad for what had happened to him.

When Sinbad offered to let him stay with him in Brookside Close, Tinhead agreed to put the past behind him and make a fresh start. To help him achieve this, Sinbad persuaded Mick Johnson to give Tinhead a job at his chip shop. At first Tinhead had few friends on Brookside close but later he and Leo became good friends, along with the Leo's cousin Jerome (Leon Lopez). Since the Shadwick family moved into No. 6, Tinhead had always shown an interest in younger daughter Emily (Jennifer Ellison), but it was some time before he had the courage to ask their out. Their first date did not go as planned as it coincided was his first day working at the New Millennium Club. Lindsey Corkhill (Claire Sweeney), his new boss, asked him to work late and he was unable to meet Emily at the arranged time. At first, Emily refused to accept his excuse, but with later encouragement from her friend Kelly she agrees to give Tinhead another chance.

Since Sinbad had decided to look after him, Tinhead tried to stay out of trouble with the police. Emily after death of her brother Jason (Vincent Price) and father Greg (Mark Moraghan) had a change of character, and began to steal from her neighbours - particularly Susannah Morrisey (Karen Drury), who she blamed for her father's death. Tinhead was infatuated with Emily that he agreed to help her seek revenge on Susannah, first by entering her house while she was out and later stealing her car so that he and Emily could go to Blackpool. While in Blackpool, Emily persuaded Tinhead to help her steal from one of the other guests and later on the way back to set fire to Susannah's car. Tinhead continued to help Emily with her vendetta against Susannah, but when she turned her attention to other innocent people he began to have doubts about her real motives.

Tinhead decided he could no longer be involved in her criminal activities after he agreed to help her break into a house only to see her start to wreck the place for no apparent reason. Tinhead told Emily they were finished, but later had a change of heart after Emily begged him to take her back and promised to change her ways. Tinhead and Emily thought they would never be caught for their crimes against Susannah, but their luck ran out after they returned from a camping holiday. While on holiday Emily had accidentally recorded on video a taped confession where she admitted carrying out various crimes during her vendetta against Susannah. It wasn't until they decided to watch the holiday video that they realised it contained their confession. They tried to stop anyone else seeing the tape but Mick picked it up and took it to Susannah's, thinking it was a comedy video.

Susannah was horrified when she saw the video, which confirmed her suspicions that Emily had been behind the hate campaign. Although furious with Emily, Susannah decided not to involve the police and just tell her grandmother Jessie Hilton (Marji Campi) instead, as she thought Emily had suffered enough with the deaths of her father and brother. However, when she called round, Jessie she was out. Susannah instead told Emily's sister Nikki (Suzanne Collins) about the video but said she wouldn't be reporting it to the police. Nikki immediately called Emily home from college and told her about the tape. Emily panicked by the thought of Susannah seeing the tape sought reassurance from Tinhead.

Tinhead and Emily returned to the bungalow but when they arrived a police car was parked outside of Susannah's house, and thinking that the police had been called they decided to run away, stealing Ray Hilton's (Kenneth Cope) car to make their escape. After they were well clear of Brookside, Tinhead tried to persuade Emily to return to the close letting him take the blame for her crimes, but Emily was determined they should go on the run together.

Tinhead managed to find a job working in a bar, but they had to leave after Tinhead fought with the owner who had attacked Emily. By this time they were running out of money so Emily decided they should call on Brian, a gay salesman they had met previously in Blackpool. Emily planned to blackmail Brian by threatening to tell his family that he was gay. Brian refused to hand over any money, so a vindictive Emily told Brian's family. Brian's wife was disgusted by this revelation and decided to leave him, taking their children with her.

Tinhead thought Emily had gone too far this time and decided they should both return to Brookside and confess to the police. Emily agreed to do this, but just as Tinhead was confessing to stealing Susannah's car, Emily discovered that Susannah hadn't reported them after all. It was too late though, as the police then ask to see the video and as a result they were both charged. Tinhead and Emily were both released on bail with Tinhead staying at Mick's house and Emily with Jessie. As if this wasn't bad enough for Tinhead, he discovered that while he was away, his best friend Sinbad had left the close.

Tinhead couldn't stand the thought of Emily going to prison, so he persuaded her to let him take all the blame when they appeared in front of the magistrate. Although Emily agreed to this she was distraught when Tinhead pleaded guilty to all the charges against him, although he was allowed home on bail pending his appearance in court. Tinhead became depressed while waiting for his trial as he and Emily were kept apart by Mick and Jessie. The night before he was due in court his mates took him for a night out at a club in an attempt to cheer him up. While at the club Tinhead saw Emily flirting Carl, a photographer, and in a jealous rage attacked him. Later, Tinhead stole Carl's car as an act of revenge and with Robbie Moffatt (Neil Davies), Clint Moffatt (Greg Pateras) and Mike Dixon (Paul Byatt) as passengers. He was soon racing round the streets at high speed. Mike was concerned for his safety and told Tinhead to slow down, but his plea was ignored until eventually their car crashed. Tinhead, Robbie and Clint escaped but Mike was badly hurt and ended up in hospital with serious back injuries.

When Tinhead appeared in court he pleaded guilty to all charges and was sent to prison. Later, Emily was sentenced to community service by a juvenile court. At first, Tinhead found it difficult to adjust to prison life and soon had a confrontation with another prisoner Sotto who tried to intimidate him. Tinhead soon made Sotto realise he couldn't be bullied and before long he had gained the respect of many of the prisoners.

Craig, a prisoner who befriended Tinhead whilst in prison was beaten up badly by Sotto. Tinhead found him unconscious on the floor with serious injuries. Upset that his friend was badly injured, Tinhead decided to get revenge on Sotto; he broke into another prisoners cell, stealing drugs which he had kept stashed away and planted them in Sotto's cell. When the prisoner demanded to Tim to give him the drugs back, Tinhead discreetly told him that Sotto has them in his cell. He found the drugs in Sotto's cell and gave him a vicious beating. Tinhead smiled while hearing Sotto being attacked. Meanwhile, Emily wanted to earn extra money so that she and Tinhead could get married after his release. Carl took advantage of this and persuaded her to pose topless for some magazine photos. But Emily had second thoughts afterwards and after explaining everything to Nikki, Emily, with Nikki's help, called on Carl to demand the negatives.

Although Emily thought she had all the photos, one still found its way into a girlie magazine, thanks to Carl. It was not long before a copy of this magazine arrived at Tinhead's prison, and the other prisoners took great delight in tormenting Tinhead about it. Emily explained that she posed for the photos in an attempt to earn extra money, and although Tinhead was initially furious with Emily, eventually he forgave her. Upon release, Tinhead made Carl refund the money Emily paid to pose for the photos.

Soon after he was released Tinhead and Emily decided to get married, although the ceremony was held in secret to prevent Jessie trying to stop them. On the day of the wedding Emily only just made it to the registry office in time after being held up at the hair salon. While Tinhead wore a traditional suit, Emily opted for something a little different and got married wearing a white boob tube, mini skirt, white fur coat and a cowgirl Stetson. Jessie found out about the wedding but was too late to prevent them getting married. She argued with Tinhead outside the registry office, but he ignored her and drove away with Emily in a stretch Limo, to spend their first night in a hotel. The next day they returned to the close, but Jessie refused to allow Tinhead to stay with Emily in the bungalow. It seemed the newly weds would have nowhere to live until Mick agreed to let them stay at No 5 while he and Yvonne were away on holiday.

Emily persuaded Tinhead to hold a party at the Johnson house while Mick was away, and although this seemed a good idea, things turned nasty after Sotto and Weller (two of Tinhead's ex-cell mates) turned up. Sotto tried to hit on Emily but she purposely poured her drink all over him. Tinhead, hearing the argument ordered Sotto to leave but Sotto decided to get his own back by inviting loads of his friends to No. 5 where they held their own party with music blasting out from the car stereo which upset a lot of the neighbours, especially Ron Dixon and Jimmy Corkhill. Jimmy stole the car and drove off out of the close to stop the music playing out loud. After the music had stopped, Sotto guessed that Tinhead had grassed him up. Whilst attacking Tinhead, Emily told Sotto that if he doesn't leave, Tinhead will have him beaten up again like he did in prison. In an act of revenge, Sotto and his mate smashed Mick's wide screen TV.

Despite this Mick allowed Tinhead and Emily to continue living at No 5, until he decided to move away from the close after splitting up with Yvonne. Luckily, Jimmy Corkhill (Dean Sullivan) took pity on them and offered to let both Tinhead and Emily stay at his house. Tinhead almost ended up in prison again after supplying Ron Dixon (Vince Earl) with the gun used to shoot Clint Moffat, but Jimmy persuade Ron to tell police he got the gun from Sotto. Jimmy encouraged Tinhead to stay away from crime, but he found it impossible to get a good job with a prison record.

Tinhead approached Christy Murray (Glyn Pritchard), in the hope that he would offer him some work, but Christy just laughed at him. Furious at being made to look foolish, Tim wanted revenge, so after gaining information from Lance Powell (Mickey Poppins) about one of Christy's scams put his plan into action. He followed Christy to where he collected some stolen booze, and waited until Christy left the van unattended. Tinhead jumped in the van and drove off, but when he later tried to sell Christy back the booze at a profit, he was forced to give it back when Christy turned up with two mates. Undeterred, Tinhead persuaded Christy to let him take part in another heist on a lorry loaded with booze. Although they managed to steal the lorry, they were caught by the gang. Tinhead ended up in the Mersey while Marty was given a beating.

Christy was forced to give the gang all the booze from Bev's Bar while Tinhead ended up in hospital after being washed up on the banks of the Mersey. Christy was terrified of the gang, so when Tinhead pressured him for the information about them, he ran off. Later he enlisted Steve Murray's (Steven Cartait) help and together they managed to steal a van full of booze from the gang without being seen. Although they had a few problems finding buyers, they eventually sold all the booze around different pubs in the area. Tinhead was elated by his success and eager for another heist. Towards the end of the series, Tinhead worked as a limousine driver. He remained friends with Jimmy throughout the series. After speaking to Barry Grant (Paul Usher), Tinhead was involved in the vigilante killing of drug dealer Jack Michaelson (Paul Duckworth). His final scene in the show featured him driving Jimmy and Nikki out of the close in his limousine. Tim along with Steve got even on Terry for Emily's death after a showdown that saw Tim and Steve kill Terry by impaling him on a moving tractor spike.

=== 2025–2026: Hollyoaks Years ===
Tim is seen 22 years later in October 2025 when Mick Johnson now under the name of Donny Clark returns to the close after believing him to be dead, it is revealed Tim is still close with Nikki and Sinbad and even reminiscences of how good Mick's cheesy garlic bread was back in the day. Tim isn't seen again until January 2026 when it's revealed that he is in a relationship with Liberty Savage (Jessamy Stoddart), Liberty's sister Sienna Blake (Anna Passey) is suspicious of Tim thinking his intentions with Liberty are disingenuous. Sienna later catches Tim hanging around her now deceased serial killer father Jeremy Blake (Jeremy Sheffield) allotments before fleeing in his van when confronted by this, Tim told Sienna he just had a flat tire. Tim sees that the local nightclub The Loft is up for sale and speaks with the current owner Rex Gallagher (Jonny Labey) who was left The Loft by his deceased mother, Tim lies to Rex telling him he knows Grace and had previous had a few dealings with her in some clubs in Liverpool, Rex then decides to sell the club to Tim. It is later revealed during a conversation with Gemma Johnson (Tisha Merry) that Tim was wronged by someone, Tim later plays a dangerous game when he approaches a shady area and he poses as local gangster and hardman Warren Fox (Jamie Lomas) to gain access to the place. He later meets Nikki and tells her he has bought another club and that he will pay for her rehab, which Nikki accepts. It is soon revealed that Tim in fact knows Warren, who he blames for a failed investment the pair did together, despite this Tim seemed on somewhat friendly terms with Warren and even offers him advice on how to get Mercedes McQueen (Jennifer Metcalfe) help on her pill addiction by giving Warren a business card for a rehab facility.

Its soon revealed why Tim used Warren's identity when he is confronted by loan shark Jenson Cole (Ryan Clayton), who blackmails Tim into doing a job for him otherwise he will tell Warren about Tim using his name for a loan. Tim later steals a taxi belonging to Darren Osborne (Ashley Taylor Dawson) using Warren's ID and its soon revealed why when Warren is arrested for armed robbery of a chocolate store however Tim is snuffed out by Gemma who confronts him knowing he knows something. Tim is stunned when Gemma tells him that she gave Warren a false alibi this leads Tim to panic and he attempts to hurry Nikki out of the rehab clinic but he still bumps into Warren who delivers a brutal and bloody beating to Tim for crossing him.

After the beating, Tim goes into hiding and waits for Nikki to finish her treatment, he is seen one last time picking Nikki outside the clinic then driving off with her.

== Reception ==
For his portrayal of Tim, Olivier was nominated in the "Best Young Actor" category at the 1998 Inside Soap Awards. Mike Bradley from The Observer branded Tim a "tearaway" character. Jim Shelley from The Guardian branded Tim a "little rascal" and opined that soap operas followed a trend of "miraculously" transforming younger characters such as Tim into model citizens. Their colleague Gareth McLean bemoaned the lack of realism in Brookside and complained that it had too many characters, including Tim and Emily, that viewers could not relate to. A writer from Inside Soap branded Tim a "teeny tearaway" and a "hardened criminal waiting to happen". They added that "when it comes to boys behaving badly, Brookside's resident school bully Tinhead takes some beating." Katy Brent from Closer said that Tim was a reason to still miss Brookside after it was cancelled. She stated that Tim is "the absolute definition of a scally with a heart of gold... eventually." Brent assessed that Tim later "turned his life around" and was Emily's "voice of reason". On Tim going to prison for Emily, she concluded that "now if that isn't true love, we really don't know what is."
