= Michael Colgan (actor) =

Irish actor

Michael Colgan (born 1972 or 1973 as Michael Hughes in Keady, County Armagh) is a Northern Irish actor, novelist and academic, currently a Senior Lecturer in Creative Writing at Queen Mary University of London.

== Early life ==
Colgan was educated at Saint Patrick's Grammar School, Armagh and did his undergraduate studies in English at Corpus Christi College, Oxford, then completed a MA in Creative Writing at Royal Holloway, followed by a PhD at London Metropolitan University. He also studied at l'École Internationale de Théâtre Jacques Lecoq in Paris and has lived in London.

== Academic career ==
Colgan, who uses his birth name of Michael Hughes in his academic career, taught both Creative Writing and English Literature at his alma mater London Metropolitan University and also taught Creative Writing as a Visiting Lecturer at Roehampton University and the University of Hertfordshire, then Lecturer in Creative Writing at Queen’s University Belfast, before joining Queen Mary University of London as a Senior Lecturer in Creative Writing.

== Acting career ==
A notable early performance in Saint Patrick's Grammar School, Armagh was the role of Harpagon in Molière's L'Avare, which was performed entirely in French. After theatre school in Paris, he went back to Ireland to work with his younger brother, film director Enda Hughes, in 1996 in the feature film The Eliminator.

He starred in the 2002 feature film This Is Not a Love Song directed by Bille Eltringham. He also spent a year working in the Abbey Theatre in Dublin and has appeared in several television productions, including Rebel Heart and Sunday (2002) for the BBC.

Colgan has worked at the Royal Shakespeare Company and in productions at the Royal Exchange, the Abbey Theatre, the Lyric Players' Theatre, Belfast, the Everyman Theatre, Liverpool, the Young Vic and the Tricycle Theatre.

In 2009 he was appearing at the Young Vic in Rupert Goold's critically acclaimed production of King Lear starring Pete Postlethwaite.

In 2013, Colgan played Richard Webb in the drama series What Remains. In 2014 he appeared in the first episode of the Channel 5 detective drama Suspects.

In 2016, Colgan published his first novel, The Countenance Divine, under his real name Michael Hughes. His second novel, Country, was published in August 2018.

Colgan has appeared in two separate depictions of the Chernobyl Disaster. The first being BBC's Surviving Disaster: Chernobyl Nuclear Disaster from 2006 in which he appears as Leonid Toptunov, senior reactor control chief engineer of Reactor 4. The second was HBO's 2019 mini-series Chernobyl in which he depicts Soviet Minister of Coal Industry Mikhail Shchadov.

In 2020, Colgan starred as Rory Maguire in the third series of Nordic noir detective series Marcella.

In 2024, he depicted older Gerry Adams in the last three episodes of Say Nothing.

== Filmography ==
=== Film ===
Year	Title	Role	Notes
1997	The Eliminator	O'Brien	
2002	Sunday	Gerard Donaghey	TV film
2002	This Is Not a Love Song	Spike	
2002	Sinners	Eammon	TV film
2004	Wall of Silence	Gerard Dillon	TV film
2005	Song of Songs	Male Journalist	Voice
2005	The Year London Blew Up: 1974	O'Connell	TV film
2005	Animals	Danny Harkman	TV film
2006	Soundproof	Connor	TV film
2010	Lennon Naked	Derek Taylor	TV film
2013	Good Vibrations	Dave	
2014	Heart of Lightness	Arnholm	

=== Television ===
Year	Title	Role	Notes
2001	Rebel Heart	Liam O'Toole	2 episodes
2004	The Long Firm	Cutter	Episode: "Jimmy's Story"
2004	Surviving Disaster	Leonid Toptunov	Episode: "Chernobyl Nuclear Disaster"
2007	Silent Witness	George Woods	2 episodes
2008	Raw	Mal Martin	6 episodes
2009	Occupation	Will Davies	
2009	The Bill	Paul Brewer	Episode: "Innocence Betrayed"
2010	Holby City	Mitch Turner	Episode: "Taking Over"
2011	Doctors	Minford Boyle	Episode: "Last Christmas"
2011	New Tricks	Lorcan "Buzz" McCaffrey	Episode: "Tiger Tiger"
2011	Midsomer Murders	Father Behan	Episode: "A Sacred Trust"
2011	Great Expectations	Anxious Man	Episode 1.2
2012	The Thick of It	Mr. Chop / Declan	3 episodes
2013	The Fall	Sheldon Schwartz	2 episodes
2013	What Remains	Richard Webb	3 episodes
2014	Suspects	Laurie Wilkins	Episode: "Alone"
2016	Happy Valley	Chaplain	Episode 2.1
2016	The Secret	Paul Ramsey	Part 4
2016	Hooten & the Lady	Monsignor Fitzgerald	Episode: "Rome"
2016	My Mother and Other Strangers	Father Nolan	2 episodes
2017	X Company	Henri	Episode: "Promises"
2019	Chernobyl	Mikhail Shchadov	Episode: "Open Wide, O Earth"
2020	Marcella	Rory Maguire	Main role
2020	The Crown	IRA Lieutenant	"Gold Stick"
2022	This England	Gabriel Milland	Main role
2024	Say Nothing	Gerry Adams	Last 3 episodes
2024	The Regime	Huber, one of Elena's ministers	Miniseries, 3 episodes
2025	House of Guinness	Reverend Henry Grattan	
