= Vids =

- Directed by: Darren Bender (Series 1 & 2)
- Starring: Stef Gardiner; Nigel Buckland
- Country of origin: United Kingdom
- Original language: English
- No. of series: 6
- No. of episodes: 72

Production
- Running time: 25 minutes

Original release
- Network: Channel 4
- Release: 4 December 1998 – 6 April 2001

Vids (also known as Vidz) is a late-night, humorous video review show that was hosted by Nigel Buckland and Stef Gardiner.

The show was produced by Ideal World Productions for Channel 4 in the UK, and aired as part of Channel 4's overnight programming schedule, 4 Later.

Series 1 & 2 were directed by Darren Bender.

In 2012, a Vidz podcast was announced, but only one episode was released.

== Format ==
Presenters Nige and Stef would review a selection of the week's new DVD and video releases in their own inimitable style from their mock-videostore located in Hamilton, near Glasgow. Various locations around the city of Glasgow were featured, as the presenters took to the streets and incorporated madcap storylines into the show, padding out the time between film reviews.

Over the course of the various series, Buckland, in addition to appearing as himself, assumed the roles of various other characters, most notably his moustached, cardigan-wearing half-brother Lingus.

At the end of series 2, the Vids videostore was blown up in a storyline, seemingly killing Stef and Nige. The duo would return in episode one of series 3, being resurrected and sent back to earth to continue their task of reviewing videos. They finally acquire a new videostore in Series 5 episode two, this time located in Mosspark.

== Production ==
It ran for 6 series (72 episodes) from 4 December 1998 until 6 April 2001. The program was never given a permanent slot on Channel 4 and was frequently aired on different nights/different times from week to week.
