= Peter Straughan =

English screenwriter (born 1968)

- Born: 1968 (age 57–58)
- Occupation: Screenwriter
- Spouse: Bridget O'Connor (m. 2008; died 2010)
- Children: 1

Peter Straughan (born 1968) is an English screenwriter. He won two BAFTA Awards for Best Adapted Screenplay for Tinker Tailor Soldier Spy and Conclave, with the latter also earning him the Academy Award in the same category.

== Life and career ==
=== Early years and education ===
Straughan's first ambition was to be a professional musician and he achieved this while playing bass guitar with Newcastle-based band The Honest Johns. He spent four years touring and recording with the band through the late 1980s and into the early 1990s before leaving to take up full-time education at Newcastle University. While Straughan was a student he was also a member of the band Cactusman. He wrote the song "Killer", which appeared on the CD album North of London, a collection of music by North East bands released through Newcastle Arts.

=== Screenwriting ===
Straughan co-wrote the 2006 feature film, Mrs Ratcliffe's Revolution and adapted Toby Young's memoir How to Lose Friends & Alienate People. He is the writer of the 2009 film The Men Who Stare at Goats, and co-writer of the 2011 film Tinker Tailor Soldier Spy, for which he was nominated for the Academy Award for Adapted Screenplay, a screenplay he wrote in collaboration with his late wife Bridget O'Connor. O'Connor died of cancer, aged 49, in 2010, before the film was released. They were awarded a BAFTA for Best Adapted Screenplay.

Straughan adapted Hilary Mantel's trilogy of novels set in the royal court of Henry VIII for television. The three novels Wolf Hall, Bring Up the Bodies, and The Mirror & the Light were adapted into the 2015 Wolf Hall television series and its 2024 sequel Wolf Hall: The Mirror and the Light.

In 2025, he won the Golden Globe Award for Best Screenplay, the BAFTA Award for Best Adapted Screenplay, and the Academy Award for Best Adapted Screenplay for Conclave.

== Filmography ==
Short film

Year	Title	Director	Writer
2011	Gee Gee	Yes	Yes

Film writer

Year	Title	Director
2006	Sixty Six	Paul Weiland
2007	Mrs Ratcliffe's Revolution	Bille Eltringham
2008	How to Lose Friends & Alienate People	Robert B. Weide
2009	The Men Who Stare at Goats	Grant Heslov
2010	The Debt	John Madden
2011	Tinker Tailor Soldier Spy	Tomas Alfredson
2014	Frank	Lenny Abrahamson
2015	Our Brand Is Crisis	David Gordon Green
2017	The Snowman	Tomas Alfredson
2019	The Goldfinch	John Crowley
2024	Conclave (Note: Also credited as executive producer)	Edward Berger
2028	The Beatles — A Four-Film Cinematic Event † (Note: Including Untitled Paul McCartney film, Untitled John Lennon film, Untitled George Harrison film and Untitled Ringo Starr film)	Sam Mendes

Television

Year	Title	Director	Writer	Notes
2014	Playhouse Presents	Yes	Yes	Episode "Nosferatu in Love"
2015, 2024	Wolf Hall	No	Yes	12 episodes
TBA	Berlin Noir	No	Yes	Upcoming series

== Accolades ==
Year	Title	Award/Nomination
2011	Tinker Tailor Soldier Spy	BAFTA Award for Best British Film; BAFTA Award for Best Adapted Screenplay; British Film Bloggers Circle Awards for Best Adapted Screenplay; International Cinephile Society Awards for Best Adapted Screenplay; Italy Screenplay Award for Best International Adapted Screenplay; Online Film Critics Society Award for Best Adapted Screenplay; Richard Attenborough Regional Film Awards for Best Screenplay; San Francisco Film Critics Circle Award for Best Adapted Screenplay; Nominated – Academy Award for Best Adapted Screenplay; Nominated – Association of Women Film Journalists Award for Best Screenplay; Nominated – British Independent Film Award for Best Screenplay; Nominated – London Film Critics Circle Award for Best Screenplay; Nominated – USC Scripter Award for Best Adapted Screenplay; Nominated – Washington DC Area Film Critics Association Award for Best Adapted Screenplay
2015	Wolf Hall	Nominated – Primetime Emmy Award for Outstanding Writing for a Miniseries, Movie or a Dramatic Special
2024	Conclave	BAFTA Award for Best British Film; Academy Award for Best Adapted Screenplay; BAFTA Award for Best Adapted Screenplay; Golden Globe Award for Best Screenplay; St. Louis Film Critics Association Award for Best Adapted Screenplay; Washington D.C. Area Film Critics Association Award for Best Adapted Screenplay; Critics' Choice Movie Award for Best Adapted Screenplay; Runner-up – Toronto Film Critics Association Award for Best Adapted Screenplay; Nominated – Astra Film and Creative Award for Best Adapted Screenplay; Nominated – Chicago Film Critics Association Award for Best Adapted Screenplay; Nominated – Florida Film Critics Circle Award for Best Adapted Screenplay; Nominated – San Diego Film Critics Society Award for Best Adapted Screenplay; Nominated – San Francisco Bay Area Film Critics Circle Award for Best Adapted Screenplay

== See also ==
- List of Academy Award winners and nominees from Great Britain
