= Exhibit A (film) =

- Directed by: Dom Rotheroe
- Screenplay by: Dom Rotheroe; Darren Bender
- Produced by: Darren Bender
- Starring: Bradley Cole; Brittany Ashworth; Angela Forrest; Oliver Lee
- Cinematography: Rob Hardy
- Edited by: David Charap
- Distributed by: Warp Films
- Release date: October 1, 2007
- Running time: 85 min
- Country: United Kingdom
- Language: English

Exhibit A is a 2007 British independent psychological thriller film directed by Dom Rotheroe and produced by Darren Bender for Warp Films. The film is an example of the found footage genre and stars Bradley Cole, Brittany Ashworth, Angela Forrest and Oliver Lee. It was filmed on location in Yorkshire and Suffolk and released on 1 October 2007 at the Raindance Film Festival. It was the last film that prolific stuntman Roy Alon worked on.

== Plot ==
Judith King lives with her father Andy, mother Sheila, and brother Joe in Yorkshire. She uses the camcorder gifted to her by her father to document her everyday life and her family. Judith is a lesbian and has not yet come out to her family, and she has a crush on Claire, a teenage girl in the house next door. She often spies on Claire and films her from the bedroom window. On a trip to see their new house, Judith tries to convince Andy not to make the family move away, but is unable to tell him about her crush on Claire.

Andy is chasing a promotion, but financial strain and familial pressure cause him to behave erratically. One night, Andy comes home covered in blood and claims that his colleague, Ray, has suffered a facial injury. It appears likely that Andy is not going to get the promotion nor be able to sell the house, and this causes him further mental distress. Sheila and Joe begin to frequently argue with Andy. One night, Judith hides in the garden and Andy tries to grab her; she screams and runs back inside, locking the door behind her in her bedroom.

Andy impulsively builds a new swimming pool and the Kings hold a pool party during their open house. A disfigured Ray shows up uninvited, getting angry and nearly attacking Andy, who escorts him outside. Judith secretly films their confrontation. Ray blames Andy for his injury and accuses him of trying to steal his job, revealing that Andy has been lying to the family about the future of his career and that Ray got the promotion over him. Andy later discovers that Judith has been filming his behavioral issues.

Unable to afford their new dream house, the Kings hole up in their old house. Appalled, Sheila goes to work and Joe and Judith go to school. Andy explores the house and discovers that Sheila favours Joe over Judith as a result of post-natal depression she suffered. He finds that Joe has a stash of illegal drugs, a video of him receiving oral sex, and a secret shrine to Claire that Judith has built. On camera, Andy admits that he was the one who hurt Ray to try and get the promotion while Ray was incapacitated.

That night, they are woken up by a smoke alarm and discover that Andy has locked all the doors and windows. He then reveals everything he has discovered about the dysfunctional family, including Judith's secret infatuation with Claire. Sheila and Joe give Andy an ultimatum - either they leave or Andy does. An angry Sheila also reveals that years ago she secretly aborted her third pregnancy because she feared Andy.

The next day, Judith returns home from a visit with Claire to discover that her father is about to commit suicide. Despite her embrace, Andy chokes her before murdering Joe. Sheila witnesses Andy over the bodies and begins to scream, only for Andy to murder her as well. A sobbing Andy declares he is going to be reunited with his family. He hits the camera, causing it to roll in front of Judith's face, which reveals that she is still alive. Andy then hits and breaks the camera one final time, leaving Judith's fate unknown.

The film then cuts, showing the family on the beach together, before Andy notices the camera and shuts it off.

== Cast ==
- Bradley Cole - Andy King
- Brittany Ashworth - Judith King
- Angela Forrest - Sheila King
- Oliver Lee - Joe King
- Jason Allen - Wayne
- Charles Davies - Ray
- Emily Button - Claire
- Belinda Lazenby - Mo
- David Walker - Mike
- Terry Mann - Stu
- Dennis Turner - Mr Miller
- John Douglas - John
- Helen Fell - Sales Assistant

== Release ==
The film previewed at film festivals internationally throughout 2007 and 2008 with screenings at the Raindance Film Festival, the Berlin Film Festival, the Sofia International Film Festival and Febiofest Prague, and then received a limited cinematic release. The film became available on DVD in USA on 16 March 2010, the UK on 21 June 2010, and available to stream online through the video on demand service MUBI in September 2010.

== Awards and reception ==
The film received a positive critical reception on its release. The film was awarded the title of 'Best UK Feature' at the Raindance Film Festival and was subsequently nominated in three categories — 'Best Newcomer', 'The Raindance Award', and 'Best Achievement in Production' at the British Independent Film Awards.

Reviews have described the film variously as "a masterpiece of gradually escalating horror" and, "an ingenious and compelling thriller". With emphasis falling on the performances of the actors Bradley Cole and Brittany Ashworth, who give "stand out turns".
