= Brittany Ashworth =

English actress

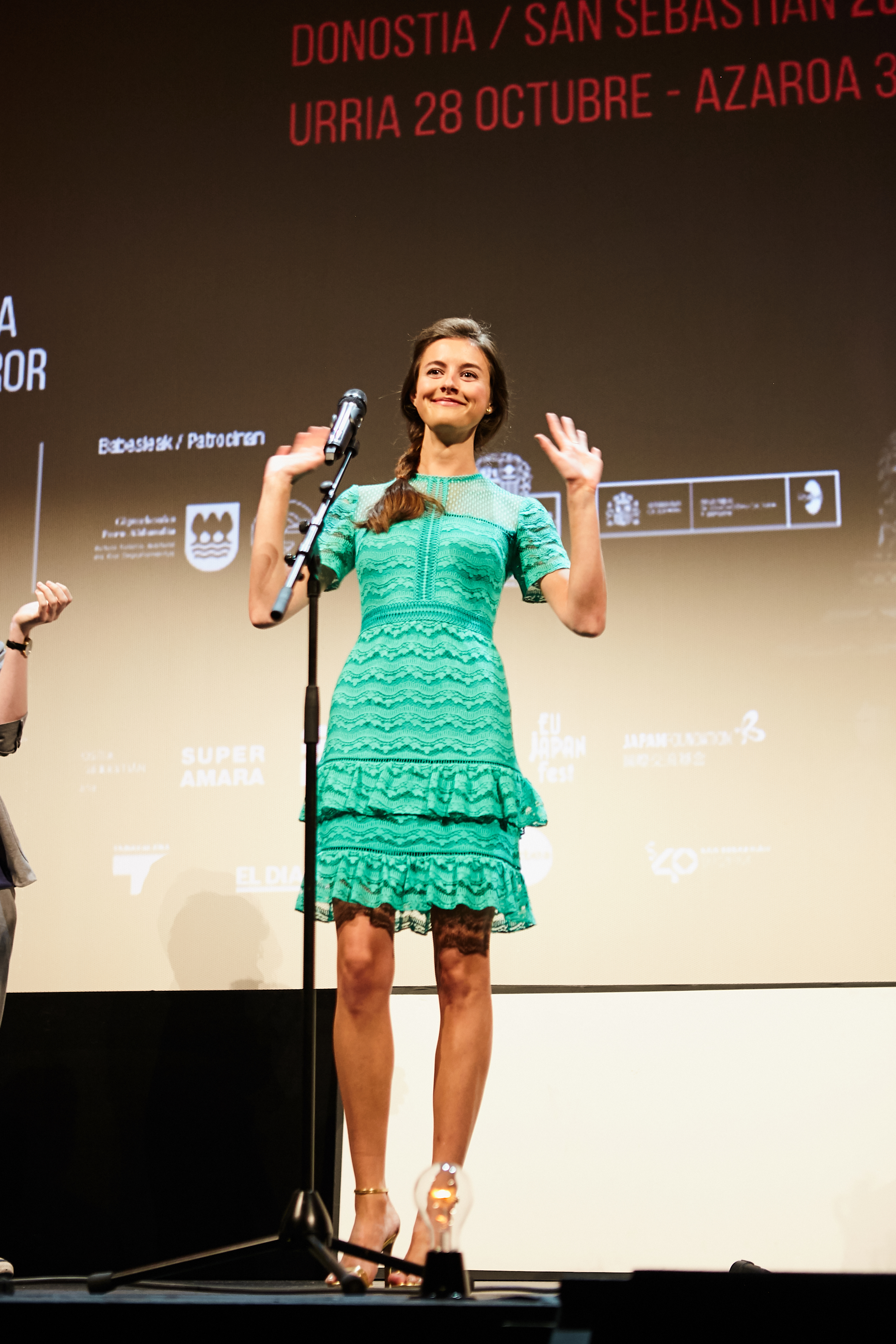
Ashworth at the 2017 San Sebastián Horror and Fantasy Film Festival

Brittany Francine Ashworth is an English actress. She began her career in the film Mrs Ratcliffe's Revolution and the ITV drama Mobile (both 2007). She has since starred in the films The Crucifixion and Hostile (both 2017), as well as The Ledge (2022). She also had a recurring role in the BBC and HBO series Industry (2022).

== Early life and education ==
Ashworth is from Lancashire. She took classes at David Johnson's Oldham Theatre Workshop. She studied English Literature at the University of Oxford.

== Career ==
Ashworth starred in Mrs Ratcliffe's Revolution and Mobile prior to university. Later, Ashworth played Sister Vaduva in the 2017 film The Crucifixion opposite Sophie Cookson, before playing the lead role of Juliet in the apocalyptic thriller film Hostile. She played Fran Adams in the 2018 British comedy film, Accident Man, and was cast in Guy Ritchie's 2019 film The Gentlemen. In 2022, Ashworth starred as mountain climber Kelly, in the direct-to-video film thriller The Ledge.

== Filmography ==
=== Film ===
Year	Title	Role	Notes	Ref.
2003	Sons & Lovers	Young Miriam	Television film	
2007	Mrs Ratcliffe's Revolution	Alex Ratcliffe		
2007	Exhibit A	Judith King		
2014	The Maiden	Tess	Short film	
2017	The Naked Screaming Man	Liz	Short film	
2017	Hostile	Juliet		
2017	The Crucifixion	Sister Vaduva		
2018	Accident Man	Fran Adams		
2019	The Gentlemen	Ruby	Uncredited	
2022	The Ledge	Kelly	Direct-to-video film	
2022	The Herring Girls	Seonak	Short film	
2023	Chairs	Mrs. Swan	Short film	
2023	Valley of Love	Kathleen Reynolds	Television film	

=== Television ===
Year	Title	Role	Notes	Ref.
2003	Cold Feet	Sophie	Episode: "Series 5, Episode 1"	
2005	Doctors	Jane Donnelly	Episode: "Disappearing Quietly"	
2006	Blue Murder	Sarah Wray	Episode: "Make Believe"	
2007	Mobile	Collette West	Miniseries; 3 episodes	
2008	The Royal Today	Siobhan	Episode: "Episode 39"	
2009	The Royal	Siobhan O'Grady	Episode: "Busman's Holiday"	
2022	Industry	Diana	Recurring role; 2 episodes	

== Awards and nominations ==
Year	Award	Category	Nominated work	Result	Ref
2017	FilmQuest Cthulhu Trophy	Best Actress	Hostile	Nominated	
2017	Hollywood Verge Film Awards	Best Actress	Hostile	Nominated	
2017	Maverick Movie Awards	Best Actress	Hostile	Nominated	
2017	New York City Horror Film Festival Awards	Best Actress	Hostile	Won	
2017	Nightmares Film Festival Awards	Best Actress - Feature	Hostile	Nominated	
2017	Nocturna Madrid International Fantastic Film Festival	Best Acting Award	Hostile	Nominated	
2017	A Night of Horror International Film Festival Prize	Best Actress	Hostile	Nominated	
2017	Fantastic Planet Film Festival Prize	Best Actress	Hostile	Nominated	
2017	Other Worlds Austin SciFi Film Festival Cthulhie	Best Feature Actress	Hostile	Nominated	
2018	Fantaspoa International Fantastic Film Festival Awards	Best Actress	Hostile	Nominated	
