= Sixty Six (film) =

2006 British film by Paul Weiland

- UK Theatrical release poster
- Directed by: Paul Weiland
- Screenplay by: Bridget O'Connor; Peter Straughan
- Story by: Paul Weiland; Taylor Gathercole
- Produced by: Tim Bevan; Eric Fellner; Elizabeth Karlsen
- Starring: Eddie Marsan; Helena Bonham Carter; Stephen Rea; Gregg Sulkin
- Cinematography: Daniel Landin
- Edited by: Paul Tothill
- Music by: Joby Talbot
- Production companies: Working Title Films; StudioCanal; WT^{2} Productions; Ingenious Media
- Distributed by: Universal Pictures (through United International Pictures; international); StudioCanal (France); First Independent Pictures (United States)
- Release dates: 3 November 2006 (United Kingdom); 1 August 2008 (United States)
- Running time: 93 minutes
- Countries: United Kingdom; France; United States
- Language: English
- Box office: $1.8 million

Sixty Six is a 2006 biographical comedy-drama film about a bar mitzvah which takes place in London on the day of the 1966 FIFA World Cup Final, based on the true life bar mitzvah of director Paul Weiland.

== Plot ==
Bernie Reubens, a young Jewish boy, is about to have his bar mitzvah. Initially, he meticulously plans a lavish reception to upstage that of his older brother Alvie, but as the family's finances lurch from one disaster to another, the family is forced to lower Bernie's expectations and stage the bar mitzvah reception at home in North London. When England reaches the 1966 FIFA World Cup Final, held on the same day, most of the guests make excuses not to come to the reception so that they can watch the game. In the end, Bernie's father Manny saves the day by driving Bernie to Wembley Stadium to witness the end of the match.

== Cast ==
- Gregg Sulkin as Bernie Reubens
- Helena Bonham Carter as Esther Reubens
- Eddie Marsan as Immanuel "Manny" Reubens
- Peter Serafinowicz as Jimmy Reubens/Immanuel Reubens Sr./Football Commentator
- Stephen Grief as Uncle Henry
- Catherine Tate as Aunt Lila
- Stephen Rea as Dr. Barrie
- Ben Newton as Alvie Reubens
- Geraldine Somerville as Alice Barrie
- Maria Charles as Mrs. Glitzman
- Vincenzo Nicoli as Leo

== Reception ==
On Rotten Tomatoes, the film has a rating of 65%, based on 52 reviews, with an average rating of 6.00/10. The site's critical consensus reads, "Likable but overly sentimental, Sixty Six has snatches of sharp dialogue but is ultimately too predicable." On Metacritic, the film holds a score of 57 out of 100, based on reviews from 11 critics, indicating "mixed or average reviews".

The Hollywood Reporter praised the film, saying "Although the subject might sound specialized, the picture is engineered with such skill that it transcends the ethnic details to become a universal story of a boy trying to find his place in an inhospitable world." Roger Ebert of the Chicago Sun-Times reviewed the film as being "enlightened by Bernie's impassioned narration and by a gallery of small comic details." The New York Times described the film as "A dolorous comedy that leans heavily, if inoffensively, on ethnic stereotypes."

== See also ==
- List of association football films
