= The Crucifixion (film) =

2017 horror film by Xavier Gens

- Poster
- Directed by: Xavier Gens
- Written by: Chad Hayes; Carey W. Hayes
- Produced by: Leon Clarance; Peter Safran
- Starring: Sophie Cookson; Brittany Ashworth; Corneliu Ulici
- Cinematography: Daniel Aranyó
- Edited by: Adam Trotman
- Music by: David Julyan
- Production companies: Lotus Entertainment; Motion Picture Capital; Poznan Film Group; Premiere Picture; The Safran Company
- Distributed by: Grindstone Entertainment Group; Lionsgate
- Release date: October 6, 2017
- Running time: 90 minutes
- Countries: United States; United Kingdom; Romania
- Language: English
- Box office: $6 million

The Crucifixion is a 2017 horror film directed by Xavier Gens, written by Chad Hayes and Carey W. Hayes and starring Sophie Cookson, Brittany Ashworth and Corneliu Ulici. It is based on the Tanacu exorcism that took place in Vaslui County, Romania, in 2005.

== Plot ==
In Bucharest in 2004, Father Dumitru and several nuns perform a violent exorcism on Sister Adelina Marinescu, who is believed to be possessed by the demon Agares. Dumitru and four nuns are arrested for murder when the three-day ordeal culminates in the death of Adelina.

New York journalist Nicole Rawlins convinces her editor to let her investigate the case. He cautions Nicole to not allow her personal views on faith or the death of her mother to affect her objectivity.

Nicole begins by interviewing Father Dumitru in jail. Dumitru claims he could have saved Adelina, and she only died because Bishop Gornick interfered with the unauthorized rite's completion.

At Adelina's funeral, Nicole meets Adelina's close friend Sister Vaduva, who insists the young nun was not murdered. Nicole follows a secret passage into the underground chamber where the exorcism was performed, and takes pictures of the cross where Adelina died before Bishop Gornick throws her out.

She then meets local priest Father Anton, who identifies Sister Vaduva as well as Adelina's brother Stefan Marinescu, whom Vaduva lives with on a nearby farm. Anton directs Nicole to speak directly to Bishop Gornick at St. Joseph's Cathedral.

Bishop Gornick tells Nicole that Adelina was mentally ill, not possessed, then goes on to infer that Father Dumitru was a rogue priest who overzealously performed an inordinate amount of exorcisms. She then has a strange encounter with mute gypsy boy, Tavian Amanar, outside.

Nicole returns to Father Anton who theorizes that the demon allowed Adelina to die because it no longer needed her and could transfer its evil into someone else for another possession.

Nicole begins having terrible nightmares as well as waking visions involving strange activity. Vaduva again tells Nicole that the demon killed Adelina. Vaduva recounts how the seeming suicide of Father Gabrielle, a close mentor who unexpectedly threw himself from the monastery's bell tower, triggered Adelina's transformation.

Over dinner with Father Anton, Nicole confides in him how she lost her faith when her terminally ill mother died following a decision to abandon medical treatment for trust in God. Anton warns that Nicole is an easy target for the demon.

Nicole has another odd encounter with Tavian on her way back to the hotel. Following a sexual fantasy involving Father Anton, Nicole wakes to a frightening vision of Adelina.

Another visit with Vaduva reveals that Adelina fell in love with a man who led her away from the church, but the relationship ended unexpectedly. Adelina's plea for God's forgiveness seemingly invited The Devil instead. Vaduva describes what Adelina's exorcism was like.

Father Anton brings a bottle of wine to Nicole at her hotel as an apology for how he left things the night before. They drink together and Nicole dreams of sex with Anton once again, but the priest leaves without incident when Nicole falls asleep after drinking one glass.

Nicole interviews Dr. Funar, who diagnosed Adelina as a schizophrenic. Dr. Funar recalls a demonic vision Adelina had during her diagnosis. While driving, Nicole notices rays of sunlight, which her mother once said were signs from God, seemingly directing her to a cemetery. Nicole finds Father Gabrielle's grave, and learns he died on the same day as her mother.

Connecting that the demon possessed Adelina after it killed Father Gabrielle, Nicole rushes to the monastery. Gabrielle's records show that his last appointment was with Tavian Amanar.

Presuming that Father Gabrielle performed an exorcism on Tavian, Nicole goes to see the boy's father. Mr. Amanar reveals that Tavian actually retrieved Gabrielle to exorcise his father, as Mr. Amanar was hearing voices telling him to kill Tavian. Nicole is suddenly possessed by Agares and Father Anton races to the farmhouse to find Nicole violently possessed and levitating. While Tavian and Mr. Amanar hold her down, Anton performs an exorcism, pleading for Nicole to renew her faith. Nicole has a vision of her mother as the demon is ultimately expelled from her body.

Nicole returns to New York. End title cards reveal that Father Dumitru and the nuns were arrested and served seven years in prison for Sister Adelina's murder, and that Father Dumitru resumed his exorcism service after his release from prison.

== Cast ==
- Sophie Cookson as Nicole Rawlins
- Brittany Ashworth as Vaduva
- Corneliu Ulici as Father Anton
- Matthew Zajac as Bishop Gornik
- Radu Banzaru as Amanar
- Javier Botet as faceless man
- Florian Voicu as Tavian
- Maia Morgenstern as Dr. Funar
- Radu Andrei Micu as Deacon

== Production ==
On July 15, 2015, Sophie Cookson was signed on to star in the film. On October 16, 2015, the first look at the movie was revealed.

== Release ==
Though the premiere had been announced for the 2016 Screamfest Horror Film Festival, the film did not appear on the program of the festival. On February 20, 2017, the first trailer was revealed. It was released theatrically on October 6, 2017 in North America.

=== Critical response ===
On review aggregator Rotten Tomatoes, the film has a rating of 6% based on 16 reviews.
