= Mikhail Shchadov =

Soviet engineer and politician (1927–2011)

- Михаил Щадов

Minister of Coal Industry
- In office 15 December 1985 – 24 August 1991
- Premier: Nikolai Ryzhkov
- Preceded by: Boris F. Bratchenko
- Succeeded by: Office abolished

Personal details
- Born: Mikhail Ivanovich Shchadov; 14 November 1927 Kamenka, Irkutsk Oblast, Soviet Union
- Died: 13 November 2011 (aged 83) Moscow, Russia
- Party: CPSU
- Education: Tomsk Polytechnic Institute

Mikhail Ivanovich Shchadov (Russian: Михаил Иванович Щадов; 14 November 1927 – 13 November 2011) was a Russian engineer who served as the minister of coal industry between 15 December 1985 and 24 August 1991, being the last Soviet minister to hold the post.

== Early life and education ==
Shchadov was born in the village of Kamenka, Irkutsk Oblast on 14 November 1927. He graduated from Tomsk Polytechnic Institute, majoring in mining engineering in 1953. He also graduated from the All-Union Financial and Economic Correspondence Institute with a degree in economics in 1965. The same year, he also graduated from the Higher Party School which was attached to the central committee of the Communist Party.

== Career ==
Shchadov began his career at 15, working in a mine in Cheremkhovo as a site manager. Then, he became the chief engineer and head of a mine. Next, he was named the manager of a trust, Mamslyuda, in 1961, which he held until 1963. From 1966, he worked at the Vostsibugol plant as deputy head and then head of the plant. He was made the general director of the Vostsibugol Production Association. In 1977, he was appointed deputy minister of the coal industry, and in 1981 first deputy minister. He was named the coal industry minister on 15 December 1985, replacing Boris F. Bratchenko in the post. Shchadov served in the cabinet led by Nikolai Ryzhkov.

Shchadov's term was extended in March 1989. Just four days after this the mine workers started a large-scale strike. He remained in office until 24 August 1991 when he was fired due to his support for the coup against Mikhail Gorbachev. However, two months later in October 1991 Shchadov was appointed chairman of the board of the Credit Bank of Moscow.

=== Party career ===
Shchadov joined the Communist Party in 1947. He became a deputy at the Supreme Soviet in the 11th convocation and was a member of the Communist Party's central committee from 1986 to 1990.

== In popular culture ==
Shchadov was portrayed in the HBO mini series Chernobyl by Michael Colgan, but the drama lowered his age and depth of experience in the coal industry for narrative purposes. In reality, Shchadov enjoyed healthy support amongst coal miners and faced little resistance in drafting them into the Chernobyl recovery effort.
