= Mrs Ratcliffe's Revolution =

2007 British comedy drama film

- Theatrical release poster
- Directed by: Bille Eltringham
- Written by: Bridget O'Connor; Peter Straughan
- Produced by: Hugo Heppell
- Starring: Catherine Tate; Iain Glen; Brittany Ashworth
- Cinematography: Sean Bobbitt
- Edited by: John Wilson
- Music by: Robert Lane
- Production companies: Assassin Films; Pioneer Pictures; UK Film Council
- Distributed by: Warner Bros. Pictures
- Release dates: 9 July 2007 (Cambridge Film Festival); 28 September 2007
- Running time: 102 minutes
- Country: United Kingdom
- Language: English

Mrs Ratcliffe's Revolution is a 2007 British comedy drama film, directed by Bille Eltringham and starring Catherine Tate, Iain Glen and Brittany Ashworth, about a British family who move to East Germany in 1968, during the Cold War. It was filmed in Hungary and the United Kingdom, and was released on 9 July 2007 at the Cambridge Film Festival, and nationwide in the UK on 28 September.

== Plot ==
The Ratcliffes, a leftist family in the UK, decide to emigrate to communist East Germany because they want to live in a country where everyone is equal and there is social and economic justice for all.

Frank Ratcliffe is the father / husband and an English teacher. Dorothy is the mother / wife. She is a housewife. They have 2 daughters. Alex is the older one, decadent, into painting and boys. Mary loves socialism and her father. Uncle Philip is Dorothy's brother. He lives with them, wants to be a photographer but was unemployed in Britain.

Soon after emigrating, they renounce their British citizenship and burn their passports. However, as time passes they discover life in the German Democratic Republic (GDR) is not quite what they expected.

There are severe restrictions on anything from the West, whether it be ideas, music, dress, food, books etc. There is severe censorship on everything and people are punished severely for the slightest infringement of the socialist ideals as defined by the government of the GDR in 1968.

Finally the family has had enough and they illegally escape by crossing the border to West Germany in a hot air balloon.

== Cast ==
- Catherine Tate as Dorothy Ratcliffe
- Iain Glen as Frank Ratcliffe
- Brittany Ashworth as Alex Ratcliffe
- Heike Makatsch as Frau Unger
- Jessica Barden as Mary Ratcliffe
- Christian Brassington as Thomas
- Nigel Betts as Uncle Philip
- Robert Daniel Lowe as Otto
- Ottilia Borbáth as Frau Glock
- Béla Fesztbaum as 1st Stasi Officer
- Fanni Futár as Uti
- Imola Gáspár as Art Teacher
- Ákos Horváth as 2nd Border Guard
- Barna Illyés as Gym Teacher
- John Kirk as Mr. Murray
- Karl Kranzkowski as Rector
- Uwe Lauer as Truck Driver
- Piroska Móga as Ursula
- Ben O'Brien as 2nd Stasi Officer
- Gábor Pintér as 1st Border Guard
- Alexander Scheer as Willi
- Arndt Schwering-Sohnrey as Jerzy
- Katharina Thalbach as Anna
- Susan Tordoff as Mary's Teacher
- Stephan Wolf-Schönburg as Herr Vort

== Reception ==
As of June 2020, Mrs Ratcliffe's Revolution holds an 83% approval rating on Rotten Tomatoes, based on six reviews with an average rating of 5.6/10. Because of its limited release, there were few reviews, but Channel 4 Online and The Guardian Films cited the film as a vehicle for the blooming film careers of both Catherine Tate and Brittany Ashworth. The film won the Audience Award at the Wurzburg International Film Weekend.
