= Nikki Shadwick =

Fictional character from Brookside

- Brookside and Hollyoaks character
- Portrayed by: Suzanne Collins
- Duration: 1998–2003, 2025–2026
- First appearance: 27 March 1998 (Brookside); 22 October 2025 (Hollyoaks)
- Last appearance: 4 November 2003 (Brookside); 25 February 2026 (Hollyoaks)
- Crossover appearances: Hollyoaks (2025)
In-universe information
- Occupation: Student
- Father: Greg Shadwick
- Mother: Margi Shadwick
- Brothers: Jason Shadwick
- Sisters: Emily Shadwick
- Grandfathers: Tommy Shadwick
- Grandmothers: Jessie Hilton

Nikki Shadwick is a fictional character from the British soap operas Brookside and Hollyoaks, played by Suzanne Collins. The character debuted on-screen during the episode broadcast on 27 March 1998. Collins made her final appearance as Nikki in Brookside on 4 November 2003, which was the show's final episode. Collins returned as Nikki in a 2025 Brookside and Hollyoaks crossover episode as part of latter series’ 30th Anniversary. Collins continued to appear as Nikki in Hollyoaks episodes broadcast in 2026.

== Casting ==
Collins was advised to audition for the role of Nikki by a drama teacher. She had no previous acting training and had only appeared in amateur school plays. Collins was invited back to five further casting sessions until she secured the role. Collins recalled disbelief when she was informed had got the part.

== Development ==
When Nikki is first introduced into the series, she is portrayed as a "carefree teenager from a close knit family." A writer from the show's official website described her as a university student who is "enjoying life". Her personality changed as writers created traumatic storylines for her such as being raped and grieving family deaths. She was then written as a character on a journey to rediscover the person she was before her trauma. Nikki eventually regains her "positive outlook on life" and becomes "determined" to move on.

Nikki remained a part of the show's regular cast until the final episode of Brookside, which was broadcast on 4 November 2003.

On 1 September 2025, it was announced that Collins had reprised her role for a Brookside and Hollyoaks crossover episode as part of latter's 30th Anniversary. Of her return, Collins stated "I'm honoured and privileged to be part of this special episode and to play Nikki again, I feel like I'm going home." She added it would be "emotional" returning without her co-star Sullivan, who had died in 2023. She added that securing the role was "life-changing" and despite being a working actress after Brookside ended, "nothing comes close to my Brookside family". Collins reprised the role again and Nikki returned to Hollyoaks in January 2026. Her return was announced alongside Philip Olivier and Michael Starke, who play Tim O'Leary and Sinbad respectively, who also both appeared with Collins in the Brookside and Hollyoaks crossover episode. Writers paired Nikki in a new friendship story with Hollyoaks character, Mercedes McQueen (Jennifer Metcalfe). Collins was delighted to return for more stories and revealed "I couldn't believe my luck when I saw Nikki has a friendship with the iconic Mercedes."

== Reception ==
For her portrayal of Nikki, Morgan Cormack from Radio Times branded Collins a "Brookside legend". Angela Hagan from Daily Mirror described the character as "tragic Nikki Shadwick" who is "a young girl who has suffered bereavement, date rape, alcoholism and betrayal."
