= List of The L Word episodes =

This is a list of all episodes from the series The L Word which aired from January 18, 2004 to March 8, 2009. With the exception of the pilot episode, all episode titles begin with the letter L. A total of 71 episodes aired over six seasons.

== Series overview ==
Season	Episodes	Originally released	
Season	Episodes	First released	Last released
1	14	January 18, 2004	April 11, 2004
2	13	February 20, 2005	May 15, 2005
3	12	January 8, 2006	March 26, 2006
4	12	January 7, 2007	March 25, 2007
5	12	January 6, 2008	March 23, 2008
6	8	January 18, 2009	March 8, 2009

== Episodes ==
=== Season 1 (2004) ===
No. overall	No. in series	Title	Directed by	Written by	Original release date
1 2	1 2	"Pilot"	Rose Troche	Story by : Ilene Chaiken and Kathy Greenberg & Michele Abbott; Teleplay by : Ilene Chaiken	January 18, 2004
3	3	"Let's Do It"	Rose Troche	Susan Miller	January 25, 2004
4	4	"Longing"	Lynne Stopkewich	Angela Robinson	February 1, 2004
5	5	"Lies, Lies, Lies"	Clement Virgo	Josh Senter	February 8, 2004
6	6	"Lawfully"	Dan Minahan	Rose Troche	February 15, 2004
7	7	"Losing It"	Clement Virgo	Guinevere Turner	February 22, 2004
8	8	"L'Ennui"	Tony Goldwyn	Ilene Chaiken	February 29, 2004
9	9	"Listen Up"	Kari Skogland	Mark Zakarin	March 7, 2004
10	10	"Luck, Next Time"	Rose Troche	Rose Troche	March 14, 2004
11	11	"Liberally"	Mary Harron	Ilene Chaiken	March 21, 2004
12	12	"Looking Back"	Rose Troche	Guinevere Turner	March 28, 2004
13	13	"Locked Up"	Lynne Stopkewich	Ilene Chaiken	April 4, 2004
14	14	"Limb from Limb"	Tony Goldwyn	Ilene Chaiken	April 11, 2004

=== Season 2 (2005) ===
No. overall	No. in season	Title	Directed by	Written by	Original release date
15	1	"Life, Loss, Leaving"	Dan Minahan	Ilene Chaiken	February 20, 2005
16	2	"Lap Dance"	Lynne Stopkewich	Ilene Chaiken	February 27, 2005
17	3	"Loneliest Number"	Rose Troche	Lara Spotts	March 6, 2005
18	4	"Lynch Pin"	Lisa Cholodenko	Ilene Chaiken	March 13, 2005
19	5	"Labyrinth"	Burr Steers	Rose Troche	March 20, 2005
20	6	"Lagrimas de Oro"	Jeremy Podeswa	Guinevere Turner	March 27, 2005
21	7	"Luminous"	Ernest Dickerson	Ilene Chaiken	April 3, 2005
22	8	"Loyal"	Alison Maclean	A. M. Homes	April 10, 2005
23	9	"Late, Later, Latent"	Tony Goldwyn	David Stenn	April 17, 2005
24	10	"Land Ahoy"	Tricia Brock	Ilene Chaiken	April 24, 2005
25	11	"Loud and Proud"	Rose Troche	Elizabeth Hunter	May 1, 2005
26	12	"L'Chaim"	John Curran	Ilene Chaiken	May 8, 2005
27	13	"Lacuna"	Ilene Chaiken	Ilene Chaiken	May 15, 2005

=== Season 3 (2006) ===
No. overall	No. in season	Title	Directed by	Written by	Original release date
28	1	"Labia Majora"	Rose Troche	Ilene Chaiken	January 8, 2006
29	2	"Lost Weekend"	Bille Eltringham	A. M. Homes	January 15, 2006
30	3	"Lobsters"	Bronwen Hughes	Ilene Chaiken	January 22, 2006
31	4	"Light My Fire"	Lynne Stopkewich	Cherien Dabis	January 29, 2006
32	5	"Lifeline"	Kimberly Peirce	Ilene Chaiken	February 5, 2006
33	6	"Lifesize"	Tricia Brock	Adam Rapp	February 12, 2006
34	7	"Lone Star"	Frank Pierson	Elizabeth Ziff	February 19, 2006
35	8	"Latecomer"	Angela Robinson	Ilene Chaiken	February 26, 2006
36	9	"Lead, Follow or Get Out of the Way"	Moises Kaufman	Ilene Chaiken	March 5, 2006
37	10	"Losing the Light"	Rose Troche	Rose Troche	March 12, 2006
38	11	"Last Dance"	Allison Anders	Ilene Chaiken	March 19, 2006
39	12	"Left Hand of the Goddess"	Ilene Chaiken	Ilene Chaiken	March 26, 2006

=== Season 4 (2007) ===
No. overall	No. in season	Title	Directed by	Written by	Original release date
40	1	"Legend in the Making"	Bronwen Hughes	Ilene Chaiken	January 7, 2007
41	2	"Livin' La Vida Loca"	Marleen Gorris	Alexandra Kondracke	January 14, 2007
42	3	"Lassoed"	Tricia Brock	Ilene Chaiken	January 21, 2007
43	4	"Layup"	Jessica Sharzer	Elizabeth Ziff	January 28, 2007
44	5	"Lez Girls"	John Stockwell	Ilene Chaiken	February 4, 2007
45	6	"Luck Be a Lady"	Angela Robinson	Angela Robinson	February 11, 2007
46	7	"Lesson Number One"	Moises Kaufman	Ariel Schrag	February 18, 2007
47	8	"Lexington & Concord"	Jamie Babbit	Ilene Chaiken	February 25, 2007
48	9	"Lacy Lilting Lyrics"	Bronwen Hughes	Cherien Dabis	March 4, 2007
49	10	"Little Boy Blue"	Karyn Kusama	Elizabeth Ziff	March 11, 2007
50	11	"Literary License To Kill"	John Stockwell	Ilene Chaiken	March 18, 2007
51	12	"Long Time Coming"	Ilene Chaiken	Ilene Chaiken	March 25, 2007

=== Season 5 (2008) ===
No. overall	No. in season	Title	Directed by	Written by	Original release date
52	1	"LGB Tease"	Angela Robinson	Ilene Chaiken	January 6, 2008
53	2	"Look Out, Here They Come!"	Jamie Babbit	Cherien Dabis	January 13, 2008
54	3	"Lady of the Lake"	Tricia Brock	Ilene Chaiken	January 20, 2008
55	4	"Let's Get This Party Started"	John Stockwell	Elizabeth Ziff	January 27, 2008
56	5	"Lookin' at You, Kid"	Angela Robinson	Angela Robinson	February 3, 2008
57	6	"Lights! Camera! Action!"	Ilene Chaiken	Ilene Chaiken	February 10, 2008
58	7	"Lesbians Gone Wild"	Angela Robinson	Elizabeth Ziff	February 17, 2008
59	8	"Lay Down the Law"	Leslie Libman	Alexandra Kondracke	February 24, 2008
60	9	"Liquid Heat"	Rose Troche	Ilene Chaiken	March 2, 2008
61	10	"Lifecycle"	Angela Robinson	Angela Robinson	March 9, 2008
62	11	"Lunar Cycle"	Bob Aschmann	Ilene Chaiken	March 16, 2008
63	12	"Loyal and True"	Ilene Chaiken	Ilene Chaiken	March 23, 2008

=== Season 6 (2009) ===
No. overall	No. in season	Title	Directed by	Written by	Original release date
64	1	"Long Night's Journey Into Day"	Ilene Chaiken	Ilene Chaiken	January 18, 2009
65	2	"Least Likely"	Rose Troche	Rose Troche	January 25, 2009
66	3	"LMFAO"	Angela Robinson	Alexandra Kondracke	February 1, 2009
67	4	"Leaving Los Angeles"	Rose Troche	Ilene Chaiken	February 8, 2009
68	5	"Litmus Test"	Angela Robinson	Angela Robinson	February 15, 2009
69	6	"Lactose Intolerant"	John Stockwell	Elizabeth Ziff	February 22, 2009
70	7	"Last Couple Standing"	Rose Troche	Ilene Chaiken	March 1, 2009
71	8	"Last Word"	Ilene Chaiken	Ilene Chaiken	March 8, 2009
