= Bridget O'Connor =

British playwright and screenwriter (1961–2010)

- Born: 18 January 1961; Harrow, London, England
- Died: 22 September 2010 (aged 49); Hove, East Sussex, England
- Occupations: Playwright, screenwriter
- Spouse: Peter Straughan (m. 2008)

Bridget O'Connor (18 January 1961 – 22 September 2010) was an English playwright and screenwriter. She won the BAFTA Award for Best Adapted Screenplay and was nominated for the Academy Award in the same category for her work on Tinker Tailor Soldier Spy, alongside her husband Peter Straughan.

== Life and career ==
=== Early years and education ===
O'Connor was born in Harrow, north-west London, the second of five children. Her father Jim was from Cork in Ireland, and her mother Bridie was from Limerick. Despite living in Harrow, O'Connor was surrounded by cèilidh bands and Irish dancing, spending her summer holidays on Banna Strand.

She attended Catholic schools, before graduating from Lancaster University in 1982 with a degree in English and Creative Writing. After her studies, she worked in a building-site canteen and bookshop.

=== Career as a playwright ===
O'Connor's first success in writing came in 1991, when her story "Harp" won the Time Out Short Story Prize. After this she wrote two collections of stories: Here Comes John was published in 1993, and Tell Her You Love Her was published in 1997. Both were published by Cape. One story, "Postcards", was featured in the first edition of The New Picador Book of Contemporary Irish Fiction, and "A Woman's Hair" was included in the second edition in 2000. She worked as Northern Arts literary fellow at Durham and Newcastle University from 1996 until 1998, meeting fellow writer and future husband Peter Straughan. She was briefly the writer-in-residence at University of East Anglia in 2000.

Her plays were often broadcast on BBC Radio 4, such as The Centurions, States of Mind (which was co-written by Straughan), and Becoming the Rose, which won the Arts Council England's Write Out Loud award in 2000.

While living in Cork, O'Connor began writing a full-length stage play, called The Flags. Full of black comedy, it told the story of two lifeguards on Ireland's "second-worst beach". The play was directed by Greg Hersov and was first performed in Manchester's Royal Exchange Studio, before moving to the main theatre. After its Manchester run, it was produced in Liverpool, Dublin, Belfast, Slovenia, and Australia, and was translated into French in 2011. In a review in The Guardian by Alfred Hickling, it was given four out of five stars and described as being "as sharp and gritty as the authentic Galway sand covering the floor".

She was later commissioned by several theatres, including the Tricycle Theatre and the Royal Exchange. She began writing a feature film called The Lovers for Live Theatre Company, and a short film called Dead Terry.

=== Screenwriting ===
In her final years, O'Connor worked with her husband on several projects. They wrote the screenplay for the 2006 film Sixty Six and the 2007 film Mrs Ratcliffe's Revolution.

They adapted John le Carré's novel Tinker Tailor Soldier Spy into a 2011 film of the same name, for which they were awarded the BAFTA Award for Best Adapted Screenplay. It was nominated for several other awards, including the Academy Award for Best Adapted Screenplay in 2012. Tinker Tailor was dedicated to her.

=== Personal life and death ===
In 2001, O'Connor and Straughan moved from Hackney to Cork with their daughter Connie. They later moved to Hove in East Sussex, and married in May 2008.

She was first diagnosed with breast cancer during her pregnancy, but went into remission. In a 2007 interview with The Irish Times, she expressed her desire not to be seen as a "breast cancer writer", avoiding the topic in her writing due to a fear of being "pigeonholed" into the subject. She eventually died from cancer on 22 September 2010.

== Filmography ==
Year	Film	Notes	Ref.
2006	Sixty Six	Screenplay (co-written with Peter Straughan)	
2007	Mrs Ratcliffe's Revolution	Screenplay (co-written with Peter Straughan)	
2011	Tinker Tailor Soldier Spy	Screenplay (co-written with Peter Straughan)	

== Accolades ==
=== Plays and short stories ===
Year	Award	Story/Play	Ref.
1991	Time Out Short Story Prize	"Harp"	
2000	Arts Council England's Write Out Loud Award	Becoming the Rose	

=== Film ===
Year	Award	Category	Film	Result	Ref.
2011	Chicago Film Critics Association	Best Adapted Screenplay	Tinker Tailor Soldier Spy	Nominated	
2012	Academy Award	Best Adapted Screenplay	Tinker Tailor Soldier Spy	Nominated	
2012	British Academy Film Awards	Best Adapted Screenplay	Tinker Tailor Soldier Spy	Won	
2012	Georgia Film Critics Association	Best Adapted Screenplay	Tinker Tailor Soldier Spy	Nominated	
2012	International Cinephile Society	Best Adapted Screenplay	Tinker Tailor Soldier Spy	Won	

== See also ==
- List of Academy Award winners and nominees from Great Britain
