= Oliver Lee (actor) =

British actor

- Born: Oliver James Lee; 14 February 1986 (age 40); Leigh, Manchester, England
- Occupation: Actor
- Years active: 1998, 2005–present
- Known for: Hollyoaks: In the City (2006); Waterloo Road (2011)
- Children: 3

Oliver James Lee (born 14 February 1986) is an English actor. He played the role of Josh Jones in the Channel 4 television drama series Hollyoaks: In the City, during 2006; and Aiden Scotcher in the BBC One school-based drama series Waterloo Road, during 2011. He was born in Greater Manchester, England.

== Career ==
In 2005, Lee starred in the film Legless for Red Productions and Channel 4 but it was to be his role as gay teenager Josh Jones in the television drama series Hollyoaks: In the City the following year in which proved to be his breakthrough. Lee then went on to star in Wired for ITV1, Gemma Factor for BBC Three and Exhibit A, a feature thriller by Bigger Pictures/Warp Films. He had a recurring role in the ITV soap opera Emmerdale as Pearl Ladderbanks grandson Owen Hartbourne. Other TV work includes an adaptation of Kate Long's The Bad Mothers Handbook, where he played Paul, the boyfriend of Holly Grainger's character, who gets his teenage lover pregnant.

He has completed a number of short films including short film "King Ponce", which featured at the Cannes Film Festival in 2007. He has appeared in radio dramas such as The Birth and Death Of Daylight for Radio 3, The Moment Your Life Stops for BBC Radio 4 and the popular radio detective series Stone with Hugo Spear and Maxine Peak

In 2009 Lee starred in Awaydays, a major motion picture adapted from Kevin Sampson's novel. He also stars in Powder, the second of Kevin Sampson's novels to be adapted for the big screen, playing James Love. Filming has included 'Live' performances at V Festival 2009 as 'The Grams'.

Lee starred in the production McQueen, a feature which he had written and directed. The film had an independent budget and cast included Lee Battle, Nico Mirallegro, Linzey Cocker, Marcquelle Ward and Tina O'Brien.

Lee played Aiden Scotcher on BBC's Waterloo Road.

== Honours and awards ==
Oliver Lee won the Manchester Evening News Theatre Awards for Best Newcomer for his portrayal of the character Jamie in the Octagon Theatre Bolton / Pilot Theatre production of Jonathan Harvey's Beautiful Thing.
