= This Is Not a Love Song (film) =

2002 film directed by Bille Eltringham

- Directed by: Bille Eltringham
- Starring: Michael Colgan; Kenneth Glenaan; David Bradley
- Release date: 2002
- Country: United Kingdom
- Language: English

This is Not a Love Song is a 2002 British film directed by Bille Eltringham and starring Michael Colgan, Kenneth Glenaan, David Bradley and John Henshaw. It is the first film to be streamed live on the Internet simultaneously with its cinema premiere.

The film was available online 5–19 September 2003.
