= Hollyoaks: In the City =

- Created by: Daran Little
- Written by: Daran Little; Katie Douglas; David Allison; John Reiger; Kirstie Falkous; Simon Crowther
- Directed by: Rob Rohrer; Daikin Marsh; Sarah Walker; Ian Bevitt; Tessa Hoffe; David Kester; Tracey Rooney; Paul Murphy
- Starring: Gemma Atkinson; Marcus Patric; Kym Marsh; Lee Warburton; Georgina Walker; Philip Olivier; Alexis Hall; Oliver Lee; Leon Lopez; Bryony Seth; Effie Woods; Adam-Jon Fiorentino
- Opening theme: Next to Me (Vocals by Shayne Ward)
- Ending theme: Next to Me (Vocals by Shayne Ward)
- Country of origin: United Kingdom
- No. of series: 1
- No. of episodes: 20

Production
- Producer: Daran Little
- Production location: Liverpool
- Running time: 50–60 minutes (excl. adverts)

Original release
- Network: E4
- Release: 14 August – 18 December 2006

Hollyoaks: In the City is a British television drama series set in Liverpool, first broadcast in 2006. Hollyoaks: In the City is a spin-off of Channel 4 soap opera, Hollyoaks, originally devised by Phil Redmond. It also served as a continuation to 2005's Hollyoaks: Let Loose, which also starred Gemma Atkinson and Marcus Patric.

On 16 November 2006 the writer of the show, Daran Little, announced on his Myspace site that the series had not been recommissioned due to low audience figures.

== Synopsis ==
After returning home from Sri Lanka, Ben and Lisa move in with Ben's friend "Tank Top" when they cannot afford to purchase their own place. They quickly settle in and plan to purchase a bar in Liverpool. However, Ben is tricked into handing over the deposit to con men. After being given a chance to retrieve his money by a local entrepreneur, Burton, Ben finds himself embroiled in a world of crime and sleaze and he tries to work off his debt.

Lisa starts to work at Burton's modeling agency, Gloss, which is actually a front for an escort agency run by Burton. Lisa befriends Polly (Georgina Walker) who shares a flat with Kay (Kym Marsh) but Kay is murdered after two episodes. Afterwards a story arc involving Kay's murder emerges with many characters under suspicion; Denise Welch guest stars as the detective in charge of investigating the murder. Kay's brother, Mickey, turns up, but is later killed after breaking into Burton's office.

The series also features Oliver Lee as a gay student, Josh, who becomes infatuated with his teacher, Adam (Philip Olivier). The producers made the decision of breaking up Ben and Lisa, with Ben ending up with Polly and Lisa sleeping her way through the male characters. Lisa briefly turns to escorting as does Ben when he sleeps with Stella (Claire King) so that Polly is able to give up escorting. However it is clear Lisa and Ben are still in love with each other.

The final episode comes to a dramatic climax as Debbie finds out the truth that Polly isn't her real sister and runs off to find Josh; Polly later appears to commit suicide by overdosing; and Josh and Adam get together briefly, but when Adam kisses another man at the nightclub, Josh runs off distraught. Lisa is abducted by clients of Stella who intend to use her in a snuff pornographic film, whilst Ben, Burton and Tank Top frantically rush to find her. This ends in tragedy when Lisa, whilst trying to escape, accidentally shoots Ben in the stomach and he dies in her arms as Burton and Tank Top look on.

The themes introduction was composed by Luke Blu.

== Characters ==
Main cast

- Gemma Atkinson plays Lisa Hunter. Model and secretary to Burton, who becomes deeper and more involved in the glamorous lifestyle.
- Marcus Patric plays Ben Davies. Lisa's boyfriend and a doorman to Burton's exclusive nightclub. He fast becomes Burton's favourite henchman.
- Lee Warburton plays Burton Phillips. Lisa and Ben's employer, Burton is wealthy, bisexual and straight to the point.
- Georgina Walker plays Polly Clarke. The sister of Debbie, Polly frequently "whores herself" although does not enjoy it.
- Philip Olivier plays Adam Tyler, a teacher at the local school. He begins to develop feelings for one of his male students, leading towards a catalyst of events.
- Alexis Hall plays model scout Precious, in love with Troy and insanely jealous of the women who get his attention. Cunning and sly, but a good friend.
- Leon Lopez plays Tank Top, Ben, Adam and Lisa's flatmate and another of Burton's bouncers.
- Effie Woods plays Millie Andrews, Adam's posh girlfriend, a teacher at the local school, who just wants to be loved.
- Oliver Lee plays Joshua Jones, a gay 16-year-old, taught by both Adam and Millie.
- Bryony Seth plays Debbie Clarke, Polly's sister and Josh's best friend. She wants to be just like her sister, not knowing the truth of her sister's jobs.
- Adam-Jon Fiorentino plays Troy, a not very bright, Australian, wannabe actor, who trades sex with Burton for jobs.
- Kym Marsh (2 episodes) plays Kay Price. The mother of Burton's daughter Melanie, and one of the more renowned models/prostitutes employed by Burton. Kay was murdered after being filmed in a snuff movie.

Recurring cast

- Nick Hayes plays Orson Buxton, the courier to the modelling agency, film buff and wannabe director who gets beaten up by Ben, then gets close to Lisa.
- Charlotte Hughes plays Lauren.
- Elaine Tan plays Gucci, the funky Chinese model.
- Wynnie la Freak plays Connie, the local drag queen upstairs.
- Claire King plays Stella, a business woman, not unlike Burton, who appears to be willing to do anything for money. She does however seem to have a compassionate streak below the surface, secretly hating what she does to people.
- Faye McKeever plays Donna Marie
- Oliver Mellor plays Det. Monroe.

== Episodes ==
No.	Title	Original release date
1	"Episode One"	14 August 2006
Ben and Lisa return to England and they move in with Ben's friends Tank Top in Liverpool. They decide to purchase a bar in Liverpool but get conned. Ben wakes up in bed with another woman, a model/escort named Kay.
2	"Episode Two"	21 August 2006
Burton pressures Kay for the money she owes him. Lisa, Kay and Polly go for a night out. Kay is mugged and her and Ben bump into each other. Debbie tries to get her gay friend Josh to have sex with her.
3	"Episode Three"	28 August 2006
Millie becomes even more paranoid about Adam that she confronts Lisa about it, wrongly believing that they are having an affair. Tank Top and Ben confront the scam artist who stole Ben's money.
4	"Episode Four"	4 September 2006
Ben, Adam and Tank Top have an interesting day running into randy older women, Adam meets Millie's parents, with some disastrous consequences, meanwhile, Burton takes possession of some counterfeit money, a body is discovered by bin men.
5	"Episode Five"	11 September 2006
The body is revealed as being Kay's. The girls become freaked out when they realise the agency is being watched, Debbie is rude to Josh who later comforts her, Adam splits with Millie, Lisa tries her hand at acting in a home movie.
6	"Episode Six"	18 September 2006
Millie tries to come to terms with her split with Adam. Troy unwittingly stars in gay porn, to the glee of Burton and Polly reveals her not so glam life to Ben.
7	"Episode Seven"	25 September 2006
Lennox gives Josh a hard time for telling the truth. The attacker is revealed as Kay's grieving brother. Troy decides to give Burton a piece of his mind and Ben calls Lisa a "whore" for dining out as an escort girl with Polly and Burton.
8	"Episode Eight"	2 October 2006
When Ben's DNA is found in Kay's bed, he has to own up to having had sex with Kay, but hopes Lisa will not find out. Millie does her best to make Adam jealous by flirting with Troy, Ben and Lisa have a lovers tiff over Kay.
9	"Episode Nine"	9 October 2006
Adam is furious with Tank Top when he discovers that he slept with Millie, Tank Top pulls a gun out when he and Ben are tasked with retrieving a stolen file. Ben and Tank Top burn down a warehouse that is standing the way of Burton's casino plans.
10	"Episode Ten"	16 October 2006
Ben, tormented by guilt confesses to Lisa that he helped burn down a warehouse, annoyed Lisa and Ben argue. Tank Top develops a conscience when he discovers Polly is being paid to sleep with him. Adam and Josh bond, until Josh questions Adam's own sexuality. Later Adam torments himself further by looking over gay websites.
11	"Episode Eleven"	23 October 2006
Lisa and Ben are left reeling by their mutual betrayals and decide to part ways. Tank Top discovers Connie has a daughter, Donna Marie, and what's more, she's "killed" her father. Connie makes a full recovery, but not before Donna Marie and Tank Top have cemented their friendship.
12	"Episode Twelve"	30 October 2006
Adam has his first gay experience when he visits the flat of a man he met at the gym, Adam soon has a "change of heart" and heads to the school where he works in search of Millie and proposes to her, and receives a surprising "response". Precious is happy to hear Orson will be screening Lisa and Troy's film.
13	"Episode Thirteen"	6 November 2006
Ben, Lisa, Polly, Tank Top and Adam assemble for the premiere of Orson's film, but they get a shock when the footage turns out to be of Ben and Polly together. Adam and Tank Top decide to kick Ben out and ask Lisa to stay with them.
14	"Episode Fourteen"	13 November 2006
Debbie is devastated when Tank Top unceremoniously dumps her. Polly is put in a predicament when Burton offers her an escorting job; she needs the money and accepts it. She lies to Ben about it though and feels terrible.
15	"Episode Fifteen"	20 November 2006
Josh is thrilled to be staying with his hero, Adam, but Millie is less than happy with the situation…she has a wedding to plan. Debbie is thrilled to discover Tank Top is Adam's flatmate, and declares her love for him.
16	"Episode Sixteen"	27 November 2006
Josh and Debbie gatecrash Adam's stag party, where Tank Top's feelings for Debbie start to emerge. Adam turns down a lap dance from Gucci and ends up kissing Josh. His head is a blur, and as he walks home he wanders into a public toilets. He catches the eye of a guy, but ends up being arrested for gross indecency.
17	"Episode Seventeen"	4 December 2006
Adam talks about his feelings for other men, but resolves to go through with the wedding. Tensions rise as Tank Top tells the reception Adam has made a huge mistake, and Josh confronts Adam about their kiss. Burton refuses Stella's request to use Polly at one of her parties, she is already drawn to Lisa.
18	"Episode Eighteen"	11 December 2006
Tank Top plucks up the courage to ask Debbie round for dinner, but all ends in disaster. The lovebirds soon patch things up, and Polly is stunned to discover the identity of Debbie's new boyfriend. Precious is over the moon having consummated her relationship with Troy, and the couple prepare for their interview with the Immigration Office, whilst Troy realises he may well be falling in love with his new wife.
19	"Episode Nineteen"	18 December 2006
Millie cannot believe Adam has thrown away his career, but Adam tells Millie he is gay. Precious and Troy do disastrously with the Immigration Office, but are they are given the all clear. Debbie is thrilled to be Tank Top's girlfriend and Polly is now past caring. A strange woman called Louise has a revelation. She is Debbie's mum.
20	"Episode Twenty"	18 December 2006
Polly is left reeling that Debbie is not her sister and Louise is her mum. Adam and Millie pick through their relationship but when Adam goes to clear his head he runs into Josh. The pair share a gentle kiss and Josh takes him to a gay club where Adam dumps Josh for Jamie. Troy's brother has seen his gay porn flick on the Internet and furious that his relationship with his brother is in tatters, he thumps Burton through a glass window. Meanwhile, Lisa is tied up in a warehouse with Stella, when she has a pang of remorse she unties her allowing Lisa to grab a gun and defend herself. When Ben arrives he is also armed and things go badly wrong as Lisa shoots out and, mortally wounds Ben, at the same time, Polly commits suicide. The last scenes are of the characters facing the consequences of their actions, with Polly lying dead on her bed, Josh and Debbie embracing outside Adam's flat, Adam and Jamie kissing passionately in the club, Precious trying to comfort a despondent Troy, to no avail, Millie crying in her car, Burton and Tank Top reeling from Ben's death, and Lisa, cradling the deceased Ben in her arms.
