= Leon Lopez =

British actor and director

- Born: 30 August 1979 (age 47); Liverpool, England
- Education: Liverpool Institute for Performing Arts
- Occupations: Actor, singer-songwriter, model, television presenter
- Family: Rita Lopez (Mother)
- Website: http://www.leonlopez.com/

Leon Lopez (born 30 August 1979) is an English actor, television and film director, singer-songwriter and occasional model. He is best known for his role as Jerome Johnson in the Channel 4 soap opera Brookside (1998–2002). He also played Linford Short in the BBC soap opera EastEnders (2016). His first feature film as a director Soft Lad (2015) premiered at the East End Film Festival.

His musical background includes being part of numerous vocal harmony groups and he is now becoming a well known performer in the world of Theatre, and Musical Theatre in London's West End.

== Early and personal life ==
Born in Liverpool, Lopez is a former student of the Liverpool Institute for Performing Arts, established by Sir Paul McCartney. His mother is from Liverpool and of Spanish descent and his father is Jamaican. Lopez is gay.

== Directing ==
=== Film ===
Lopez's film directing credits include his debut feature film Soft Lad (2015). A micro budget self funded feature starring Daniel Brocklebank, Jonny Labey, Suzanne Collins, Craig Stein and Laura Ainsworth. It was released by Peccadillo Pictures on 9 November 2015 after a string of various UK cinema screenings. In 2018, he directed a second feature film called 'Out of Time' for Foot in the Door Films. To date he has also directed several short films including his award-winning short 'The Definition of Lonely', starring Nick Hayes and Lucas Rush, which premiered at the OutWest Film Festival in 2015 and is featured on the "Soft Lad" DVD extras.

Other short films include 'Almost Saw The Sunshine' starring Munroe Bergdorf, which premiered at Downtown Urban Arts Festival where it was nominated for Best Short Film award and was acquired by Dekkoo and Peccadillo Pictures and available on Amazon Prime streaming services. 'Ménage' Starring Adele Silva, Suzanne Collins and Craig Stein, which premiered at the Kino Film Festival in 2016. He also appeared in the documentary 'Let's Talk About Gay Sex And Drugs' which was part of the official selection for the 2016 BFI Flare: London LGBT Film Festival.

His production company Brown Boy Productions was set up in 2012, and is currently in development of a further 2 feature films and a TV series called Trade.

=== Television ===
Television directing credits include numerous episodes of Channel 4's flagship soap opera Hollyoaks for Lime Pictures. He is also a regular director for ITV's award-winning serial drama Emmerdale and in January 2021 also began directing episodes of ITV's Coronation Street.

== Acting ==
=== Television and Film ===
Lopez's television credits include appearances in episodes of Mersey Beat and Holby City for the BBC, The Court Room, Tut, The Bill, the lead role of Tanktop in Hollyoaks: In the City as well as starring for 4 years as Jerome Johnson in the Channel 4 hit soap opera Brookside. He has appeared in a number of short films, including Profanity, ( a Giant Leap Films production,) as well as appearing in the BBC's serial drama Doctors. In February 2012, Leon performed a cameo role in the independent British film The Quiet One set in Birmingham. In 2015, he starred alongside Sir Ben Kingsley in Spike TV's mini series Tut where he played the role of Sete. He also starred in hard hitting short film G O'Clock which premiered at BFI Flare: London LGBT Film Festival film festival in 2016. in 2016 he then went on to appear as a recurring character Linford Short in the UK soap opera EastEnders.

=== Theatre ===
Lopez has toured the UK as "The Childcatcher" in a run of Chitty Chitty Bang Bang and appeared in numerous pantomimes. In Autumn 2007, he played the role of "Collins" in the West End revival of Rent (musical) - Rent (musical) remixed produced by William Baker.

On 13 August 2008, he appeared in a limited run of Piaf at the Donmar Warehouse opposite Elena Roger. He then went on to appear at The Royal Court Theatre, London in the role of "Deity" in Tarell Alvin McCraney's "Wig Out!" directed by Dominic Cooke which ran from November 2008 to January 2009.

May 2009 he took on the role of "Michael" in Jonathan Larson's Tick, Tick... BOOM! at The Duchess Theatre, in London's West End.. Autumn 2009 he was a part of the grand relaunch of Derby Playhouse Theatre, appearing in the rock musical "The Pro's, Con's and a Screw" alongside "Kidulthood" star Adam Deacon

In February 2010 Lopez appeared opposite Leslie Caron, Greta Scacchi and Lambert Wilson in Stephen Sondheim's musical A Little Night Music at The Chatelet Theatre in Paris, playing the role of Frid. His latest show, John Adams' Broadway-style show I Was Looking at the Ceiling and Then I Saw the Sky at Theatre Royal Stratford East, London, opened in July 2010 and was a huge critical success, gaining several 4-star reviews in national papers such as The Independent and The Times.

He then started rehearsing for a new production of Elegies for Angels, Punks and Raging Queens in aid of The Terrence Higgins Trust at The Shaw Theatre, London

Lopez was selected to perform as Brit in the second national tour of Ben Elton and Queen's smash hit rock musical We Will Rock You. He starred WWRY at Bristol Hippodrome on 29 October 2011 and performed as Britney Spears.

== Reality TV ==
In 2007 Lopez appeared in the second series of the Reality TV programme Soapstar Superstar where he caught the attention of the music industry after being the seventh person to be voted off the series and was immediately signed to "Celebrity Records". Leon has been a contestant on both Celebrity Fear Factor and Soapstar Superchef. He has also worked as a television presenter.

== Music ==
=== Debut album - 'Moving On' ===
Since signing his record deal, Leon has teamed up with producer Rod Gammons, manager Leon Mitchell and recorded music from the likes of Take That star Gary Barlow to produce his debut album 'Movin On'. His first single 'Love Got in the Way' was released in August 2007 and entered the official UK charts at number 58. His first studio album 'Moving On' was released 1 February 2010.

=== 2nd studio album ===
He is currently writing his 2nd album with producer Paul James which is set to be an 'electro' inspired concept album.

=== Performances ===
Leon also sang at the opening ceremony of the 2002 Commonwealth Games held in Manchester, live to over 500 million viewers worldwide. Lopez has also performed his single on daytime television shows such as Loose Women and performed at numerous concerts.

=== Achievements ===
As part of his first pop group A:M, Leon was nominated for MOBO AWARD for best unsigned act as well as winning numerous awards such as Holstein Pills Discovers and the Liverpool Echo Arts award for 'Best Unsigned Act'.
