= Bille Eltringham =

British film and television director

Bille Eltringham (sometimes mis-spelt 'Billie') is a British film and television director. She is a graduate of Bournemouth Film School.

Her most recent film is Mrs Ratcliffe's Revolution (2007). She co-directed The Darkest Light (1999) with Simon Beaufoy, and directed This Is Not a Love Song (2002), the first film to be simultaneously streamed on the Internet with its cinema premiere.

TV work includes directing the critically acclaimed BBC drama, The Long Firm (2004); directing an episode of The L Word ("Lost Weekend", 2006); directing two episodes of the BBC series Ashes to Ashes (2007) and two episodes of the ITV series Lewis (2009 and 2010). Earlier TV work includes Kid in the Corner (1999) and Physics for Fish (1993).

Short films include Lune (1993) and Yellow (1996).

She worked as a boatswain on square rigged tall ships and as a dresser and prop builder in the theatre.

Eltringham lives in London on a boat called Zebullon.
