= Darren Bender =

British film editor

Darren Bender became known in the UK TV industry for creating several long-running new film-maker's initiatives (Coming Up & The Other Side) at broadcaster Channel 4. As commissioning editor there, he encouraged over one hundred drama and documentary film makers to make films inexpensively and often experimentally for late night slots on Channel 4. After a spell as head of production at one of the regional branches of the UK Film Council, he set up Bigger Pictures, his independent television and film production company. His first feature film Exhibit A was released in 2010 and won Best UK Feature at the Raindance Film Festival. He made a variety of television content, including for Sky3D (Sky UK), before closing Bigger Pictures in 2014 to be a full time parent.

In 2021, he returned to filmmaking by producing, writing and directing the indie film Ferryman, which has won several awards at film festivals.
