= Philip Olivier =

British actor (born 1980)

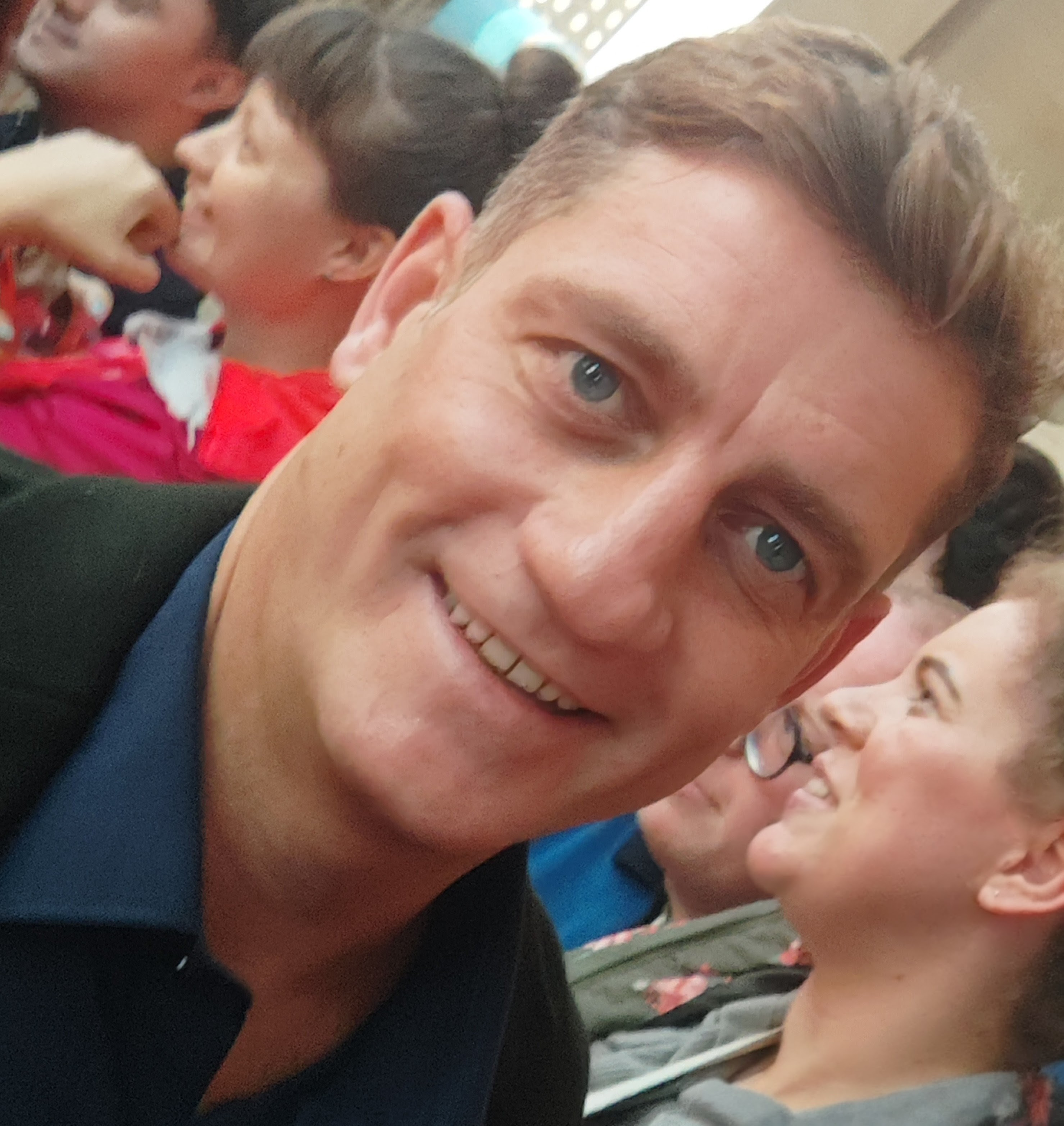
- Olivier in 2025
- Born: Philip Lawrence Borg-Olivier; 4 June 1980 (age 46); Liverpool, England
- Occupations: Actor; model; stage performer
- Years active: 1995–present

Philip Lawrence Borg-Olivier (born 4 June 1980) is an English actor, model and stage performer best known for playing the role of Tim "Tinhead" O'Leary in the soap opera Brookside.

== Career ==
Olivier's first role was in 1995 in the Channel 4 production Hearts and Minds with Christopher Eccleston. In 1996, he started playing his first television role as Timothy "Tinhead" O'Leary in the Channel 4 soap opera Brookside, and continued in the role until the show was cancelled in 2003. He also appeared in the one-off drama Brookside: Unfinished Business, which followed the series in 2003.

After leaving Brookside, Olivier performed in two dozen audio plays based on the Doctor Who television series by Big Finish Productions as a companion of the Seventh Doctor named Hex. He has also appeared as one of the guest regulars in the Channel 4 comedy sketch show Bo Selecta. Popular with gay audiences, Olivier hosted Mr Gay UK in 2005 and appeared on-stage at several Gay Pride events. Olivier appeared nude in the December 2008 and April 2009 editions of the gay magazine Attitude.

In 2005, he won the Channel 4 reality TV show The Games, dominating the competition from start to finish. After displaying an impressive physique in the series, Olivier went on to do a number of photo shoots and released calendars from 2006 to 2009. In 2006 he appeared as Jimmy Price, a self-centred professional footballer who sustains a broken leg in The Royal episode "From This Day Forward".

Olivier appeared in a celebrity edition of Come Dine with Me in February 2009. He competed alongside Christopher Biggins, Julia Bradbury and Edwina Currie and finished second to Biggins, the eventual winner. During February and March 2009, Olivier competed in "Escape from Takeaway Prison", a section on Ant & Dec's Saturday Night Takeaway, which he won on 21 March 2009. Olivier also appeared in an episode of Missing, a BBC One afternoon drama, playing club owner and gangster Mark Stone in March of the same year. 2009 also saw Olivier start to perform in musicals. He starred in Never Forget, about a Take That tribute band forming. He played the role of former stripper Dirty Harry. He also starred in the title role of the Camberley Theatre pantomime Dick Whittington.

In 2014, Olivier first appeared in the sixth series of Benidorm as the troublesome Jason Gallagher. He reprised the role in 2015.

In 2019, he appeared in the LGBT short film Just Me co-starring actor Carl Loughlin. The film addressed the theme of accepting your sexuality, and heterosexual men who have sex with men. The film gathered a lot of attention in the LGBT press, including an interview in The Advocate magazine. Just Me was released in October 2019 by Peccadillo Pictures as part of their "Boys on Film" collection.

== Personal life ==
In 2013, Olivier featured in an episode of the Channel 4 production of Four in a Bed, in which he and his friend Alfie Bubble own and run the Liverpool B&B Yellow Submarine. Prior to this, in 2007, Olivier was fined £20,000 by magistrates for being the landlord of a multi-occupancy rented property without a license. Olivier was the first in Liverpool to receive such fine.

Since 2017, Olivier has been the Managing director of an independent sightseeing company, Liverpool City Sights. It was reported on TripAdvisor in summer of 2022 that their tour 'City & Beatles' was voted the best bus tour in the world.

== Filmography ==
=== Television ===
Year	Title	Character	Notes
1996–2003	Brookside	Timothy 'Tinhead' O'Leary	462 episodes
2003	Brookside: Unfinished Business	Timothy 'Tinhead' O'Leary	Video-only release
2003	Pleasureland	Ben	Television film
2005	Twisted Tales	Iggy	Episode: 'Charlie's Angel'
2005	Holby City	Steve Morrison	Episode: 'Bird on a Wire'
2006	Hollyoaks: In the City	Adam Tyler	20 episodes
2008	Ghosthunting With	Himself	Episode Ghosthunting With Paul O'Grady
2009	Missing	Mark Stone	Series 1, episode 2
2010–2014	Doctors: The Go-Between	Remy Fry / Gary Ramsbottom / Matt Darby	4 episodes
2013	The Spa	Lee	Episode: Christmas Special: 'Strangers in the Night'
2014–2015	Benidorm	Jason Gallagher	2 episodes
2025–2026	Hollyoaks	Timothy 'Tinhead' O'Leary	

=== Audio Dramas ===
Year	Title	Character	Notes
2004-2020	Doctor Who Main Range	Thomas Hector Schofield (Hex)	30 stories
2006	Doctor Who Magazine Audio Specials	Thomas Hector Schofield (Hex)	Story: 'The Veiled Leopard'
2018-2026	Star Cops	Paul Bailey	27 Stories
2023-2024	Seventh Doctor Adventures	Thomas Hector Schofield (Hex)	Story: 'The Last Day part one', 'The Last Day part two'

=== Film ===
Year	Title	Character	Production
2008	The Crew	Paul the Hom	Syndicate Films
2019	Just Me	Scott	
