= Suzanne Collins (actress) =

English actress and businesswoman

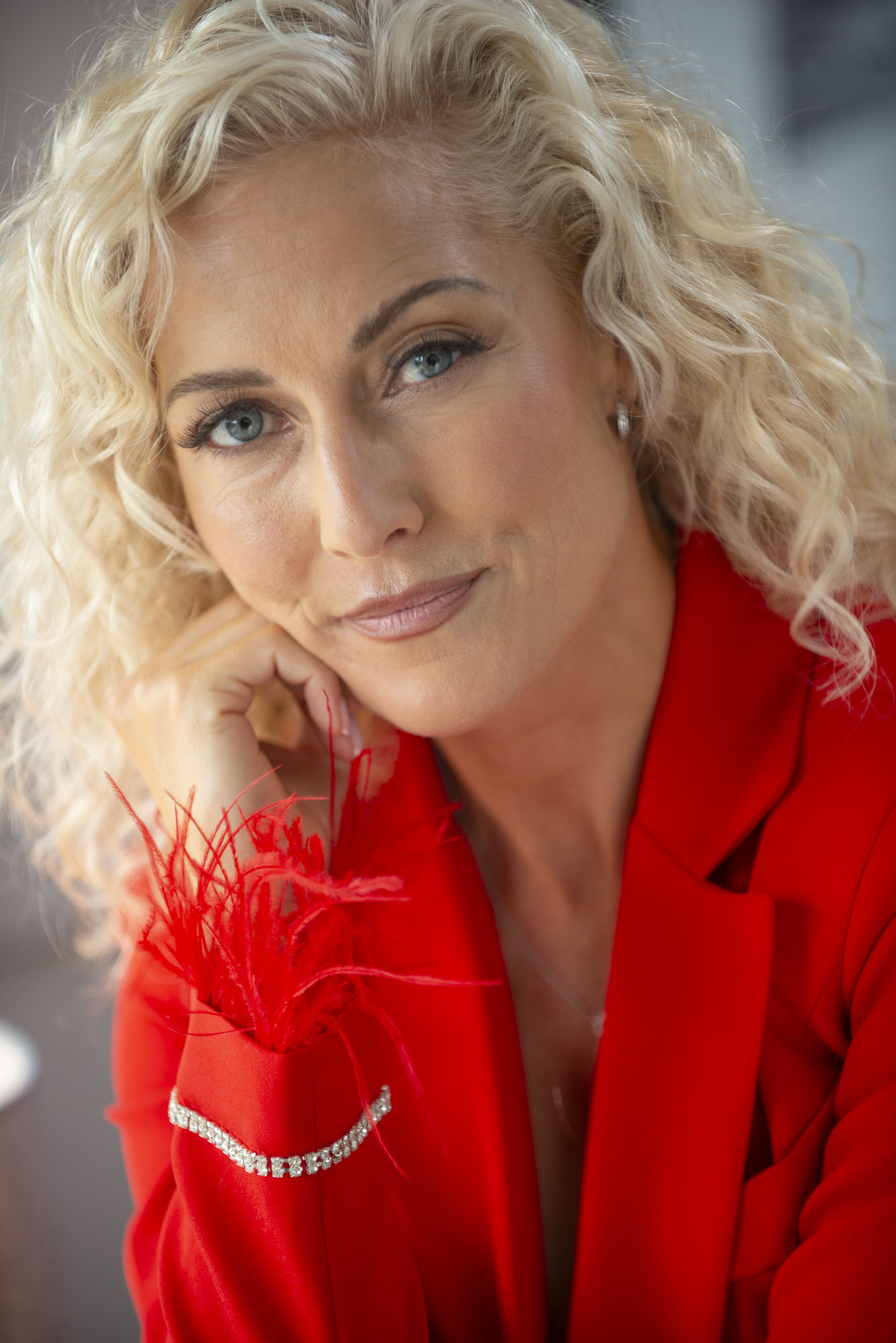
- Born: 25 May 1978 (age 47); Liverpool, England
- Occupations: Actress; businesswoman
- Years active: 1998–present
- Spouse: Stephen Clemence (m. 2017)
- Website: www.suzannecollins.co.uk

Suzanne Collins (born 25 May 1978) is an English actress and businesswoman. She is known for portraying the role of Nikki Shadwick on the Channel 4 soap opera Brookside.

== Early life ==
Collins was born in Mill Road Hospital, Liverpool, in 1978. She attended Prenton High School for Girls and then Birkenhead Sixth Form College.

== Career ==
At the age of 19, she landed the role of Nikki Shadwick in Brookside, joining the soap opera in 1998 and remaining until the last episode in 2003.

After the birth of her daughter, Mya, in 2004, she continued to work steadily, primarily on television in such series as Doctors and The Bill, and also landed the role of Detective Annie Osborne in the 2006 film Lycanthropy. She also played the role of Sarah in film Charlie Noades R.I.P. in 2009.

Collins played a "WAG" in 15 Minutes That Shook the World - a film about Liverpool FC in Istanbul when they won the Champions League. In 2015, she portrayed Jane in the movie Soft Lad.

Collins was also the co-director of drama company High Horizons Ltd, founded by Collins and fellow actress Ann Marie Davies. They provided acting and filmmaking workshops, drama classes, and holiday clubs to schools and colleges throughout the UK.

In 2019, she portrayed the role of Mrs. Trantor in the 5Star prison drama Clink.

== Personal life ==
Collins married former footballer Stephen Clemence in June 2017.
