= Rachel Jordache =

Fictional character from Brookside

- Brookside character
- Portrayed by: Tiffany Chapman
- Duration: 1993–2003
- First appearance: 15 February 1993
- Last appearance: 28 October 2003
- Created by: Phil Redmond
In-universe information
- Other names: Rachel Wright; Rachel Dixon
- Occupation: Student
- Father: Trevor Jordache
- Mother: Mandy Jordache
- Sisters: Beth Jordache
- Half-sisters: Ruth Sweeney Jr
- Husband: Christian Wright (1997–1998); Mike Dixon (2000–present)
- Sons: Michael Dixon
- Daughters: Beth Dixon
- Aunts: Brenna Jordache

Rachel Dixon (also Jordache and Wright) is a fictional character from the British Channel 4 soap opera Brookside, played by Tiffany Chapman. The character debuted on-screen during the episode broadcast on 15 February 1993. Chapman was thirteen when she joined the cast as a recurring character but was later upgraded to a regular cast member. The character is introduced as part of the show's new family, the Jordaches, consisting of mother, Mandy Jordache (Sandra Maitland) and sister, Beth Jordache (Anna Friel). Rachel's notable storylines include being sexually abused by her father, Trevor Jordache (Bryan Murray). Her violent marriage to Christian Wright (Philip Dowd) ended in divorce and Rachel later marries Mike Dixon (Paul Byatt), with whom she has two children with and endures financial difficulties. Chapman remained in the cast until the show's cancellation and end in 2003.

== Casting ==
Actress Tiffany Chapman joined an acting agency in Manchester which submitted their clients for auditions without having to do acting classes. They sent her for an audition to join the cast of Brookside, who were looking for a girl to join a "northern family". Chapman recalled she was "in the right place at the right time" when the audition opportunity occurred. She was initially unaware of what the role would involve and recalled that the process "all happened very quickly". Chapman was thirteen when she joined the cast and could only work age restricted hours to accommodate filming. Chapman was originally signed to a recurring cast contract and remained on this basis until she became sixteen years old and producers requested she become a regular cast member. She signed her first one-year regular contract when she was seventeen. Chapman lived in Oldham throughout her entire tenure on Brookside and commuted to Liverpool for the role.

== Development ==
Rachel is introduced into the series with her mother, Mandy Jordache (Sandra Maitland) and sister, Beth Jordache (Anna Friel). They arrive on Brookside Close to escape Trevor Jordache (Bryan Murray). One of Rachel's notable storylines was being sexually abused by her own father, Trevor. When he is released from prison, he resumes his violence towards Mandy. He had previously abused Beth but now begins to abuse Rachel, which causes Mandy to decide to take action. She and Beth then devise a plan to murder Trevor. When Trevor discovers they have been drugging him, he attacks Beth and Mandy stabs him to death. They then bury Trevor under the patio in their back garden.

Chapman's parents were concerned about Rachel's controversial stories when she first joined the cast and discussed her stories with producers. Chapman told Johnathon Hughes from Digital Spy that she never felt worried during her portrayal of the story. She explained that the show "protected from the serious subject matter." This meant that Chapman was not featured in the more "heavy" scenes and was contracted to restricted filming because of her age. Chapman was confident that the story was filmed "responsibly" and worked in a "supportive" environment with the cast and crew. Writers featured the character Sinbad (Michael Starke) in the story as the family's confidant. In 2020, Starke praised Chapman's performances as Rachel, stating that despite her age, she "displayed such maturity with the difficulties involved with playing such a complex young character."

Rachel's storylines explored her descent into shoplifting. Her story played into the suspense of the "body under the patio" storyline, as Rachel buries stolen goods under a section of the garden patio, unaware her father is also buried there. Mandy and Beth were later imprisoned for Trevor's murder. The storyline gained notoriety in the British media, the show's viewing ratings grew and campaigns were set up for the characters to be freed, called "Free the Jordache two". Chapman recalled witnessing protests outside the Brookside studios demanding their release. She added "when I look back, it was an exciting, unusual thing to be a part of."

In 1997, when Rachel heads towards her eighteenth birthday, writers gave her more romance storylines. Rachel develops an attraction to her neighbour, Nat Simpson (John Sandford) and pursues a romance with him. Chapman told Jon Peake from Inside Soap that Rachel thinks Nat is "cute", "intelligent and nice-looking and he intrigues her." Viewers were already aware that Nat was having an incestuous relationship with his sister, Georgia Simpson (Helen Grace). Other characters had begun to gossip about their relationship, but Rachel decides to ignore it. Chapman explained that Rachel believes her own past experiences of abuse leave her "in no position to judge" Nat. Nat is also older than Rachel, which Chapman believed was a consequence of Rachel wanting to be with older men and find a "father-figure". She added "in a way she likes to boss them around, but really she wants to be taken care of." Rachel and Nat share a kiss which is witnessed by Georgia. She responds by romancing Peter Phelan (Samuel Kane). Rachel's best friend, Jacqui Dixon (Alex Fletcher) becomes annoyed with Rachel over her involvement with Nat. She dislikes both him and Georgia and believes the rumours about them being lovers. Jacqui dislikes Rachel bringing Nat into her home. Sinbad and David Crosbie (John Burgess) take Jacqui's side, believing Rachel's "situation is ridiculous". Chapman revealed that their interference only makes her more determined to pursue Nat. Chapman concluded that Rachel's friends are just looking for her best interests.

Writers created a relationship storyline between Rachel and Christian Wright (Philip Dowd), a former recurring character who producers reintroduced into the series. Chapman has described their romance as Rachel's "first proper relationship". Rachel and Christian both secure jobs at the newly opened restaurant venue, Bar Brookie. They become attract to each other and begin dating. Chapman told Helen Childs from Inside Soap that has "finally" met a man "she really gets on with." Rachel feels she can be her true self around Christian and he makes her feel heard. Chapman noted that "no one ever seems to listen to her" but Christian understands her. She added "he wants to be with her, he makes her laugh, he listens, and she feels really safe with him." Rachel decides to confide in Christian and tell him about the sexual abuse she endured from Trevor. Chapman original hopes for the relationship would be that it helped her move on from her traumatic past. Though she noted Rachel would never fully get over the abuse. Rachel feels more confident and "she finally feels that she's moving on, and she's settling down a bit now." Rachel also has to overcome the issue of being intimate with Rachel. Chapman believed that Christian would be ideal and noted "if she's ever going to sleep with anyone, it's going to be with Christian." Another issue in their early relationship is navigating her friendship with Katie Rogers (Diane Burke). Rachel and Katie are best friends and live together, but Katie had previously dated Christian. Chapman revealed that it creates "a few awkward moments" and admitted that Rachel fails to consider Katie's feelings. She explained that Rachel is too in love with Christian to care about Katie's feelings. She defended her behaviour because she believed Rachel was overdue some happiness and claimed "at last, Rachel's life is on the up!"

Their relationship was developed quickly, with the two characters moving in together and planning a wedding after mere months into their relationship. Writers explored themes of abuse in their relationship, exploring Christian manipulating and controlling Rachel. Chapman told Steven Murphy from Inside Soap that initially Rachel is happy with Christian because he is different to her previous boyfriends. She added "she feels herself with him. She loves being settled and finally feels she's normal. She can forget the past and look forward to the future." Christian becomes paranoid about Rachel and Mike Dixon's (Paul Byatt) friendship and throws her out of their flat. He refuses to talk to Rachel but later randomly proposes marriage to her. Rachel accepts his proposal and fails to realise she has been manipulated. Chapman believed Christian had been "dominating" Rachel prior to the proposal. He is subtle in his approach but it is "slowly becoming apparent that he is manipulative." Despite Rachel being witness to her parents abusive relationship, she was never aware of how their relationship began. Chapman believed that this is why Rachel fails to recognise her relationship could be similar to that of her parents.

Christian's manipulation of Rachel intensifies during their wedding planning. Rachel suggests various ideas for their wedding but Christian objects to everything she wants. Rachel is forced to allow Christian to have complete control and goes along with his requests. Dowd branded Christian's behaviour as "sheer manipulation". He told Murphy that "he tries to get her to do everything he wants, whether it's how she wears her hair, her dress for the wedding, or other things, no matter how small." Dowd believed that Rachel does not "help herself". He explained that Christian's backstory explained his behaviours, noting he is an only child and his parents belittled him which results in him having low self-esteem. He added that Christian is a loner with no friends so "now he's got Rachel he doesn't want to let her out of his sight." In episodes broadcast in July 1997, Rachel and Christian get married. Dowd concluded that Rachel should not have married Christian and made "the biggest mistake of her life."

After one month of marriage, Christian continues to control Rachel and begins making cruel comments towards her. Rachel misunderstands his behaviour and believes he is doing it in a loving manner. Chapman told Inside Soap's Peake that at this point in the story, Rachel is "madly in love" with Christian. She added "as far as she's concerned, everything's wonderful. She thinks his nasty comments are because he cares." Chapman believed that Rachel was actually "deluded" and "living in her own little world". She believed Rachel rushed into marriage because she thought it was "dead romantic". She added that Christian is "so sneaky" and always makes her feel guilty. Rachel is not scared of Christian but "more worried about not pleasing him, and panicking about what he'll say, rather than what he'll do." Christian had not been aggressive to Rachel but Chapman believed it could escalate into a violent relationship.

Writers continued to explore Christian's behaviours until Rachel realises she is being abused just like her mother had been. The storyline mimicked Mandy's plan to murder Trevor as Rachel "finally snaps" and contemplates murdering Christian. In the build up to Rachel's plans, Christian's abuse escalates further and he begins to terrify Rachel. Chapman explained that Rachel is "very scared of him now". She believed the story changed once Christian begins to discuss Trevor and the sexual abuse she endured. She noted that "this upsets her" and he begins to force her to do physical things she does not consent to. Chapman believed Rachel "never thought he was this bad". She begins to realise she is in the same scenario as her mother was and "just wants to get rid of him". In one episode, Christian gives Rachel another tirade of abuse and she feels "she can take no more". Christian goes into the bathroom but still shouts abuse at Rachel. She goes to kitchen drawer to find a weapon to attack him with. This causes Rachel to have memories of Trevor and she decides to think of a more "elaborate plan". She decides to attempt to electrocute Christian whilst he is in the bath. Chapman explained that Rachel cannot go through with her plan and locks Christian in the bathroom. Chapman added "she wants him to know what it's like to be really frightened. She wants him to feel how he's made her feel. She's going to keep him in there until he's learned his lesson." Rachel continues to keep Christian locked up and eventually confides in Jacqui about his abuse.

On the show's official website, Rachel is described as "understandably wary of marrying again" after suffering abuse from her father, Trevor, and her first husband, Christian. They also described her as having eventually "overcome her fears" and built a marriage with Mike. They assessed that Rachel is the type of character who "would live in a cardboard box if she had to", to enable her to be with her family. They concluded that via her suffering financial worries and Mike's family arguments, Rachel "has enough to contend with". In 2002, Rachel and Mike have relationship problems. Writers expanded the Dixon family via Rachel's two pregnancy stories, which produced a daughter Beth, and later a son, Michael. Chapman remained a cast member until the end of the soap in 2003. With a ten year tenure, she was one of the longest-serving cast members in the show's final cast. In 2021, Chapman revealed that she would have remained in the role permanently if the show had of continued. She also expressed interest in reprising the role if the show was ever brought back.

== Reception ==
In 1995, a writer from The Gloucestershire Echo branded Rachel a "rebellious" character who "has been known to throw the odd tantrum." In 2002, Merle Brown from Daily Record questioned Rachel and Mike's relationship. She lambasted: "What's she doing hanging about with him anyway and, from his point of view, how could you listen to her whingeing voice day in, day out?" Jess Molyneux from Liverpool Echo included Rachel in a list of "23 members of Brookside's famous families." Molyneux and Lorna Hughes also included Rachel and Lee Banks (Matthew Lewney) storyline in which they escape to London to evade shoplifting charges in their list of "29 Brookside storylines you've probably forgotten." Helen Fear from Entertainment Daily included the Jordache family in a list of "the most iconic people to live on Brookside Close." Philip Key writing for Daily Post profiled Rachel's traumatic life and assessed that "it was quite an on-screen life for any character." Inside Soap's Jon Peake questioned why Rachel was unable to realise Christian was controlling her. He noted that her growing up in an abusive household, Rachel should have been able to identify Christian's behaviour and "learned an important lesson." In another article he assessed that Rachel was deserving of happiness but feared that "one more knock-back" would ruin her life forever because "she's so vulnerable. He concluded that "many would agree that going out with Nat Simpson is the last thing she needs, just as she's got her life back on track."
