= Strumpet City (miniseries) =

1980 Irish television miniseries

- Genre: Historical fiction
- Written by: Hugh Leonard
- Directed by: Tony Barry
- Starring: Frank Grimes; David Kelly; Angela Harding; Bryan Murray; Cyril Cusack; Donal McCann; Ruth Hegarty; Peter O'Toole; Denys Hawthorne; Eileen Murphy
- Composer: Proinnsías Ó Duinn
- Country of origin: Ireland
- Original language: English
- No. of seasons: 1
- No. of episodes: 7

Production
- Producers: Tony Barry; John Kelleher
- Cinematography: Ken Murphy
- Camera setup: Multi-camera
- Running time: 50–52 mins. per episode
- Production company: RTÉ

Original release
- Network: RTÉ One
- Release: 16 March – 27 April 1980

Strumpet City was a 1980 television miniseries produced by Irish broadcaster RTÉ, based on James Plunkett's 1969 novel Strumpet City. A seminal radio play, then stage play (the Risen People) became the basis of the novel which became the series.

It was RTÉ's most ambitious and expensive production to date. The script was written by Hugh Leonard, and Peter O'Toole played James Larkin, the union leader. The cast also included Cyril Cusack as the alcoholic priest, Father Giffley, Donal McCann as the Larkin supporter, Mulhall, David Kelly as the destitute "Rashers" Tierney and Bryan Murray as Fitz, the young unemployed worker who ends up in the trenches. Frank Grimes won a Jacob's Award for his portrayal of the young Catholic curate, Father O'Connor. Peter Ustinov made a cameo appearance in the first episode as Edward VII.

First shown in Ireland in 1980, the series was exported to the United Kingdom, where it was shown on ITV.

In 2004, a digitised and remastered version was released on DVD by Acorn Media UK.

The series was streamed on RTE Player to celebrate 60 Years of Television Christmas 2021.

== Synopsis ==
In episode 1, Young Mary finds work with the Bradshaw family in Dublin. King Edward VII visits the city, a fire breaks out in Morgan's foundry. In episode 2, Rashers Tierney struggles to survive on the streets. In episode 3, Jim Larkin finds himself at odds with fellow Union leaders. He defies police attempts to prevent him from addressing the dock workers. In episode 4, Clergymen disagree on what can be done to aid the strikers, as people become destitute.
