= Jeff Pope =

British television producer and screenwriter

Jeff Pope MBE
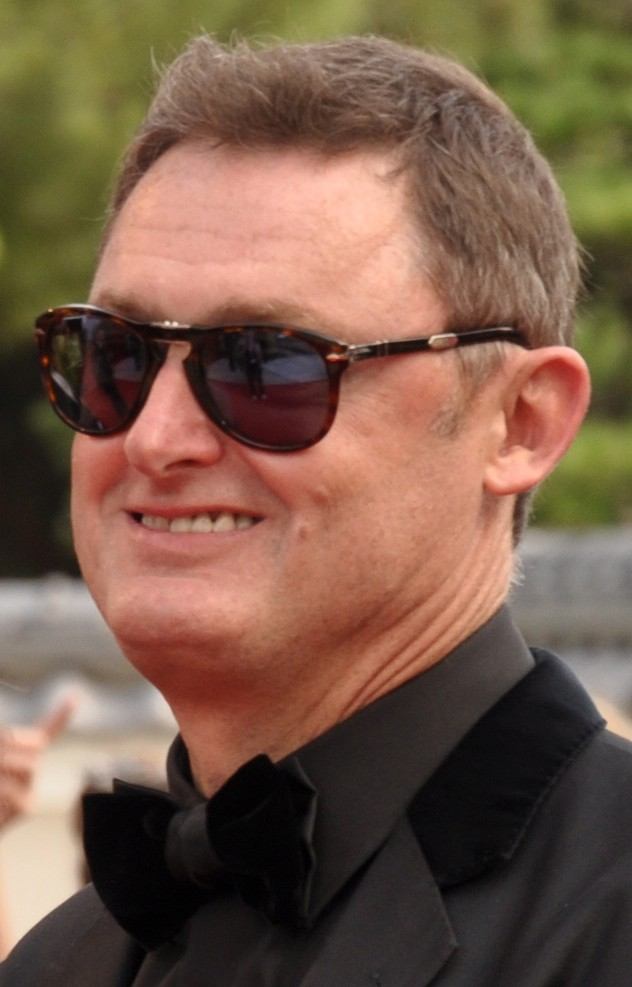
- Jeff Pope in 2015
- Born: 2 October 1961 (age 64); United Kingdom
- Occupations: Television producer, screenwriter

Jeff Pope is a British television producer and screenwriter who co-wrote the film Pierrepoint and the television drama The Fattest Man in Britain and who won a BAFTA in 2006 for the drama See No Evil: The Moors Murders. He is also the Head of ITV Productions Factual Drama. In 2015, he received a BAFTA Special Award for his contribution to television during the 2015 British Academy Television Awards. Pope wrote the screenplay for the 2018 film Stan & Ollie, and co-wrote the 2022 film The Lost King.

== Career ==
Pope's first media job was as a reporter for the Ealing Gazette. He joined London Weekend Television in 1983 as a researcher on The Six O'Clock Show. In 1996 Pope was appointed Head of Factual Drama at LWT before moving to Granada Television in the same role. He finally moved to ITV where he is Head of Factual Drama. Among Pope's television writing credits are Fool's Gold: The Story of the Brink's-Mat Robbery (1992), The Place of the Dead (1997), Essex Boys (2000), Bob Martin (2000), Dirty Filthy Love (2004), Christmas Lights (2004), Pierrepoint (2005), Northern Lights (2006), City Lights (2007), The Fattest Man in Britain (2009) and The Widower.

As a producer, Pope's credits include Fool's Gold: The Story of the Brink's-Mat Robbery (1992), The One That Got Away (1996), The Show (1997), This Is Personal: The Hunt for the Yorkshire Ripper (2000), Bob Martin (2000), Essex Boys (2000), Christmas Lights (2004), Northern Lights (2006), City Lights (2007), Pierrepoint (2005), and The Fattest Man in Britain (2009).

In addition to winning a BAFTA for the television drama See No Evil: The Moors Murders in 2007, Pope was also nominated in 2001 for My Beautiful Son, and again in 2004 for Dirty Filthy Love. In 2004 he appeared as himself in an episode of The South Bank Show. Pope and Steve Coogan were nominated for the Academy Award for Best Adapted Screenplay at the 86th Academy Awards for writing Philomena starring Judi Dench and Coogan. In 2014, Pope wrote and produced Cilla, a miniseries about the early career of Cilla Black, starring Sheridan Smith as Black.

In 2015, Pope's contributions were recognised when he received the Alan Clarke special BAFTA award.

Pope wrote the screenplay for Stan & Ollie (2018), a biographical comedy-drama film based on the lives of the comedy double act Laurel and Hardy, starring Steve Coogan and John C. Reilly as Stan Laurel and Oliver Hardy. It premiered in October 2018 at the BFI London Film Festival and was released in the United States on 28 December 2018 and in the United Kingdom on 11 January 2019. In 2022, Archie a miniseries Pope wrote about Cary Grant, was commissioned by ITV.

Pope executive-produced The Reckoning (2023), a mini-series about the crimes of Jimmy Savile, starring regular collaborator Steve Coogan as Jimmy Savile.

He wrote the series Suspect: The Shooting of Jean Charles de Menezes which was released on Disney+ in 2025.
