= Bob Mills (comedian) =

English comedian (born 1957)

- Born: Robert Edward Mills; 30 June 1957 (age 69); Chester, England
- Occupations: Comedian and Broadcaster
- Years active: 1983–present

Robert Edward Mills (born 30 June 1957) is an English comedian and broadcaster, who has appeared in the television series In Bed with Medinner and The Show.

== Early life ==
Mills was born in Chester and attended Chester City Grammar School. After a short spell of training for the Merchant Navy, he quit and worked as a valet in King's Cross, London and as a Hoffman dry cleaning presser operator, driver and delivery man. He decided to become a comedian after seeing Kevin Day and Eddie Zibbin (Pat Condell) at the Market Tavern in Islington in 1983. Mills subsequently became a mainstay for the British 'stand-up' circuit for several years.

== TV career ==
In 1983 Mills played a villain as Lon's Bodyguard in Doctor Who opposite Peter Davison as The Doctor and Martin Clunes as Lon. In the 1990s Mills hosted the daytime quiz show Win, Lose or Draw on ITV and the video games programme Games World on Sky One. He graduated to his own stand-up comedy show on ITV, In Bed With MeDinner, well known for its introduction, a remake of the opening credits of The Prisoner with Mills in the place of Patrick McGoohan. He is also a writer, having written the Michael Barrymore comedy Bob Martin. He created and wrote the Robson Green vehicle Christmas Lights, and the spin-off series Northern Lights. He also wrote the screenplay for the film Pierrepoint.

== Radio career ==
Bob Mills presented his own weekday programme in the 1990s on Greater London Radio from 10 pm to 1 am. This was during the period when other comedians also had their own programmes on GLR such as Mark Lamarr and Phill Jupitus.

He is a regular pundit on BBC Radio 5 Live's Fighting Talk, and was the holder of the Copa de Croix Saint Simon, awarded to the annual FT Champion of Champions, having defeated Martin Kelner in the 2010 Final. He lost the 2011 final to Tom Watt.

On 7 October 2011 Mills made his debut on BBC Radio 4's The News Quiz. He has subsequently returned for further appearances.

He appeared on Talksport co-presenting with Jim White between 10 am and 1 pm. Mills also hosted a weekly three-hour radio programme called "Tragedy Plus Time" on TalkRadio each Sunday, in which comedy and light entertainment were among the subjects discussed.

== Personal life ==
Mills is a supporter of Leyton Orient and is frequently mentioned in his radio broadcasts; he has also written a regular column in the Leyton Orient matchday programme. His uncle Eric Lee played in The Football League for Chester.
