= The Time of Their Lives (2017 film) =

- Directed by: Roger Goldby
- Written by: Roger Goldby
- Produced by: Sarah Sulick
- Starring: Joan Collins; Pauline Collins; Franco Nero; Ronald Pickup; Siân Reeves; Joely Richardson
- Cinematography: James Aspinall
- Music by: Stephen Warbeck
- Production company: Bright Pictures
- Distributed by: Universal Pictures
- Release date: 10 March 2017
- Country: United Kingdom
- Language: English
- Box office: $1.2 million.

The Time of Their Lives is a 2017 British road movie-based comedy film directed and written by Roger Goldby and starring Joan Collins as Helen Shelley and Pauline Collins as Priscilla.

The film was released on 10 March 2017 in the United Kingdom, followed by Australia, France and Nordic countries by Universal Pictures and Independent Film Company.

== Premise ==
Joan Collins abandons her usual glamour to play a faded and forgotten movie star living in an old folks home in London, who determines to somehow travel to her ex-lover's funeral in France in the hopes of staging a comeback. She coerces downtrodden housewife Priscilla (Pauline Collins) into accompanying her on the eventful journey, during which the odd duo become involved with a reclusive artist, played by Franco Nero. At the outset the selfish, egocentric, manipulative Helen seems to have little in common with the timid Priscilla, however during the course of their adventure the two women undergo life changes that bond them together.

== Cast ==
- Joan Collins as Helen
- Pauline Collins as Priscilla
- Franco Nero as Alberto
- Ronald Pickup as Frank
- Siân Reeves as Sarah
- Joely Richardson as Lucy
- Michael Brandon as Harry Scheider

== Production ==
On 6 February 2014 it was announced that Joan Collins and Pauline Collins, along with Franco Nero would star in The Time of Their Lives directed by Roger Goldby. Filming began in France in July 2016. In the UK, scenes were shot in Portsmouth, Bournemouth and London.

The theme song, "Morty and Me", was performed by Sophie Ellis-Bextor and co-written by Tim Rice with Peter Hobbs.

== Reception ==
=== Box office ===
The Time of Their Lives has grossed a total worldwide of $1.2 million.

=== Critical response ===
On review aggregator Rotten Tomatoes, the film holds an approval rating of 18% based on 22 reviews, and an average rating of 3.9/10. On Metacritic, the film has a weighted average score of 34 out of 100, based on 5 critics, indicating "generally unfavorable reviews".
