= The Show (British TV series) =

- Starring: Bob Mills
- Country of origin: United Kingdom
- No. of series: 1
- No. of episodes: 6

Production
- Executive producer: Jeff Pope
- Producer: Stewart Morris
- Production company: London Weekend Television

Original release
- Network: Channel 4
- Release: 1997

The Show is a British television show, produced by London Weekend Television's factual programmes department for Channel 4, which ran for a single series in 1997.

Starring comedian Bob Mills, the series comprised six 40 minute episodes and was transmitted on Saturday nights. The executive producer was Jeff Pope and the series producer was Stewart Morris.

The format was unique to British television, with each episode effectively containing edited segments of The Bob Mills Show which took the form of a conventional chat show, with Mills interviewing celebrity guests and one or two musical performances. This was interspersed with real 'behind the scenes' footage of the production team and guests, which typically showed the processes involved in getting the show to air, such as researchers booking guests, and briefing the host on the questions to ask during the show.

The backstage footage focused on controversy and drama, including several arguments and creative disputes within the team, guests who dropped out, or who were dropped, and the problems of finding last-minute replacements – none of which was alluded to during the actual chat show segments, which were always impeccably produced and presented.

Although conceptually interesting, the programme was not a huge ratings success, and several guests were reported to be unhappy with a format that exposed their backstage tantrums, fee negotiations, and attempts to control the line of questioning from the host. Notably, Sandra Bernhard lost her temper with both the audience and her pianist, and Jean-Claude Van Damme's agent was not pleased that her client's fee was ridiculed on behind the scenes footage that was transmitted.

Steve Williams, who reviewed the show for the website offthetelly.co.uk, said: "The final programme summed up everything that was great about the series. On a basic level, the director's astonishingly sweary rant was amusing, particularly as Morris had announced earlier that C4 had told them to tone down the bad language. [...] But even more fascinating was Morris and Pope discussing whether there'd be another series with some C4 executives. We were told that C4 would either do another run of The Show, or another run of the courtroom series Nothing but the Truth. The last sequence on The Show saw Mills and Pope deciding they probably wouldn't get another series – and they didn't."

Andre Vincent got his break on the show as co-writer of Bob's opening monologue and studio warm up man.
