= Homefront (2012 TV series) =

- Genre: Drama
- Written by: Jan McVerry
- Starring: Claire Skinner; Clare Higgins; Nicola Stephenson; Antonia Thomas; Warren Brown
- Composer: Miguel d'Oliveira
- Country of origin: United Kingdom
- Original language: English
- No. of series: 1
- No. of episodes: 6

Production
- Executive producer: Kieran Roberts
- Producer: Kim Crowther
- Running time: 46 minutes
- Production company: ITV Studios

Original release
- Network: ITV
- Release: 27 September – 1 November 2012

Homefront is a 2012 six-part drama that aired on ITV. The series follows the wives of British soldiers in Afghanistan.

== Cast ==
- Claire Skinner as Claire Marshbrook
- Clare Higgins as Paula Raveley
- Nicola Stephenson as Louise Mancetta
- Antonia Thomas as Tasha Raveley
- Warren Brown as Joe Mancetta
- George Costigan as Sgt Howard Raveley
- Rosie Day as Millie Bartham
- Dean Anthony Fagan as Adam Smeeton
- Daniel Francis as Sgt Carl Haleford
- Mackinley Guest as Hannah Mancetta
- Carla Henry as Julie Desford
