= Perfect Scoundrels =

- Title card, series 1 & 2.
- Created by: Ray Connolly
- Developed by: TVS Television
- Starring: Peter Bowles; Bryan Murray
- Country of origin: United Kingdom
- Original language: English
- No. of series: 3
- No. of episodes: 18

Production
- Executive producer: Graham Benson
- Running time: 60 minutes (including adverts)

Original release
- Network: ITV
- Release: 22 April 1990 – 30 May 1992

Perfect Scoundrels is an early-1990s British television comedy drama following two conmen's tarvels while conning various people. Produced by TVS Television for the ITV network, it ran for three series between 22 April 1990 and 30 May 1992. The show's main stars were Peter Bowles and Bryan Murray, as well as a cameo appearance from pop singer Lulu.

The series was repeated on The Family Channel but has never been commercially released on DVD. This is possibly due to ongoing rights issues after the production company, TVS, dropped out of the ITV network in 1992 and subsequently went through several takeovers. This problem affects the majority of the TVS programme archive as much of the original production paperwork and sales documentation has been lost during the intervening years. Most episodes however are available on YouTube.

== Transmissions ==
Series	Episodes	Originally released	
Series	Episodes	First released	Last released
1	6	22 April 1990	3 June 1990
2	6	6 April 1991	11 May 1991
3	6	25 April 1992	30 May 1992

== Episodes ==
=== Series 1 (1990) ===
No.	Title	Directed by	Written by	Original release date
1	"Bad Penny Blues"	Ian Toynton	Ray Connolly	22 April 1990
2	"Blue Kisses"	Ian Toynton	Ray Connolly	29 April 1990
3	"The Milk of Human Kindness"	Ian Toynton	Ray Connolly	6 May 1990
4	"The Play's the Sting!"	Barry Davis	Tim Aspinall	13 May 1990
5	"Sweeter than Wine"	Barry Davis	Ray Connolly	20 May 1990
6	"The Day of Jubilo"	Ian Toynton	Ray Connolly	3 June 1990

=== Series 2 (1991) ===
No.	Title	Directed by	Written by	Original release date
7	"Sh...You Know Who!"	Jan Sargent	Kieran Prendiville	6 April 1991
8	"Ah, the Sisters of Mercy!"	Jan Sargent	Barry Devlin	13 April 1991
9	"The Carpet Baggers"	John Gorrie	Kieran Prendiville	20 April 1991
10	"My Fair Daisy"	John Gorrie	Tim Aspinall	27 April 1991
11	"Grandmother's Footsteps"	Jan Sargent	Willis Hall	4 May 1991
12	"No Thanks for the Memory!"	John Gorrie	Anthony Couch	11 May 1991

=== Series 3 (1992) ===
No.	Title	Directed by	Written by	Original release date
13	"Party Games"	Graham Theakston	Peter J. Hammond	25 April 1992
14	"Dirty Tricks"	Graham Theakston	Julian Jones; Johnathan Rich	2 May 1992
15	"Last of the Few"	Graham Theakston	Peter J. Hammond	9 May 1992
16	"The Long Way Home"	John Gorrie	Russell Lewis	16 May 1992
17	"Let No Man Put Asunder"	John Gorrie	Tony McHale	23 May 1992
18	"The Goodbye Look"	John Gorrie	Russell Lewis	30 May 1992
