= Beth Jordache =

Fictional character from Brookside

- Brookside character
- Portrayed by: Anna Friel
- Duration: 1993–1995
- First appearance: 15 February 1993
- Last appearance: 25 July 1995
- Created by: Phil Redmond
In-universe information
- Occupation: Student
- Father: Trevor Jordache
- Mother: Mandy Jordache
- Sisters: Rachel Dixon
- Half-sisters: Ruth Sweeney Jr
- Aunts: Brenna Jordache
- Nephews: Michael Dixon
- Nieces: Beth Dixon

Beth Jordache is a fictional character from the British Channel 4 soap opera Brookside. Played by Anna Friel, the character's first appearance was during the episode broadcast on 15 February 1993, where Beth and her family were seen moving into number 10, Brookside Close. Beth's move to the neighbourhood—along with mother Mandy (Sandra Maitland) and younger sister Rachel (Tiffany Chapman)—was a bid to escape the clutches of her abusive father, Trevor Jordache (Bryan Murray).

Friel made her final appearance on 25 July 1995, with the character dying offscreen in the following night's episode. Beth was paramount to some of Brookside's most famous and controversial plots, such as the killing and subsequent "patio" burial of her father, and the first ever pre-watershed lesbian kiss on British television.

== Casting ==
Friel was studying for her A-levels and about to turn 17 when Brookside's casting department contacted her agent. She won the role of Beth after three auditions and made her first appearance on the show in February 1993.

== Development and storylines ==
=== Domestic abuse ===
Beth's move to the neighbourhood—along with mother Mandy (Sandra Maitland) and younger sister Rachel (Tiffany Chapman)—was a bid to escape the clutches of her bullying father, Trevor Jordache (Bryan Murray), recently out of prison after a stretch for wife battering. Successful in hunting them down to their "safehouse" on Brookside Close, Trevor convinced Mandy to let him rejoin the family unit, promising to do his best to repair their marriage. His amiability was short-lived, with repeated assaults on Mandy and Beth taking place behind closed doors. Viewers learned during this period that Beth had been incestuously abused by her father growing up.

=== Death of Trevor Jordache ===
Determined to break the cycle of abuse and protect her sister from their father's violent behaviour and sexual advances, Beth and her mother devised a plan to get rid of Trevor permanently. Realising the pair's scheme after a failed poisoning attempt, Trevor flew into a rage and attacked Beth—at which point he was lethally wounded with a kitchen knife by Mandy.

=== Aftermath and Friel's departure ===
Fearing what would happen if they went to the police, Beth and Mandy instead chose to conceal Trevor's corpse under the paving in their back garden. In a further attempt to evade punishment, they fled Brookside Close several months later and went on the run (along with Rachel, who was unaware of their crimes), but were caught, arrested and charged following the discovery of Trevor's body. Beth and Mandy's assertion of self-defence was rejected at their joint trial, with both being found guilty of murder and sent to prison.

Owing to an intense campaign—instigated by their neighbours—to set mother and daughter free, it was subsequently ruled by an appeal court that Beth and Mandy's convictions would be overturned and the pair would be released. In the wake of the good news and with both still incarcerated, Mandy learned that Beth had been rushed to hospital after falling ill: she followed her there, but was told upon arrival that Beth had died from cardiac arrest. Her death occurred offscreen in the episode broadcast on 26 July 1995.

When asked about her exit from the show, Friel told a journalist, "It wasn't a good ending. I don't know what happened, to be honest". In later years she attributed her departure—which she claimed was her own decision and left producers "furious"—to a stressful workload and fear of typecasting, as well as an overall lack of preparation for the pitfalls of fame.

=== Beth's sexuality ===
In the interim between her father's death and her arrest for his murder, Beth struck up a friendship with Margaret Clemence (Nicola Stephenson), which resulted in the two of them sharing an intimate kiss. She subsequently revealed to her mother and friends that she was a lesbian; startled by the news and unsupportive at first, Mandy later came to accept her daughter's identity.

Speaking at the time, Brookside producer Mal Young explained, "When the idea for the storyline of Beth's sexuality was born, we knew that Anna could do it. We don't give storylines like that to just anyone". Concerned that the writers may resort to a 'Don't worry, it's only a phase' type of scenario, Friel insisted the story be "handled properly" and that Beth remain a lesbian. She claimed later on that, for a long while, she "couldn't walk anywhere without people shouting 'dyke!'" at her.

== Reception ==
Brookside was commended for its "positive and non-cliched portrayal" of lesbianism, with Graham Kibble-White stating in his book, Phil Redmond's 20 Years of Brookside, that "lipstick lesbians" became fashionable during the 1990s because of Beth. Watched by six million viewers in 1994, her kiss with Margaret was a clear turning point for LGBT representation in the media, and is recognised as one of the all-time memorable moments of British television.

Remarking on the relevance of the domestic abuse plot and its parallel to real-world situations, Sandra Horley noted in her May 1995 article for The Independent, "The Brookside trial, which reaches its cliffhanger verdict tomorrow evening, has echoed the plight of numerous battered women in Britain who stand accused of murdering their violent partners. Like Mandy and Beth Jordache, the mother and daughter from the television soap who face life imprisonment if convicted of murder ... many abused women who kill find themselves between a rock and a hard place".

During her time on the show, Friel was often contacted by genuine victims of abuse, as well as by closeted teenage girls. She responded to many of their letters, despite not always feeling equipped to offer advice.

== Legacy ==
Journalist Hilary Mitchell said in 2021 that the "enduring legacy" of Beth's kiss with Margaret could not be played down: "To say that kiss caused a huge sensation is a bit of an understatement, given how often it still comes up [in conversation]". The moment was broadcast around the world—including 76 countries where homosexuality is illegal—when it played during a montage at the 2012 Olympics opening ceremony.

== Related media ==
A tie-in novelisation, The Journals of Beth Jordache, was published in March 1994 by Boxtree Ltd, a subsidiary of Macmillan Publishers. Its sequel, Beth Jordache: The New Journals, was published in July the following year. Both books were written by Rachel Braverman.

On 2 September 1995, Channel 4 aired the 32-minute documentary, Three Kisses and a Funeral, in which Friel and members of the gay community spoke of the imprint that Beth Jordache and her plights had left on popular culture.
