= Nicola Stephenson =

English actress

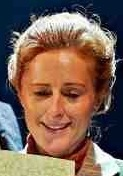
- Nicola Stephenson in War Horse as Rose Narracott
- Born: 5 July 1971 (age 55); Oldham, Lancashire, England
- Occupation: Actress
- Spouse: Paul Stephenson
- Children: 2

Nicola Stephenson (born 5 July 1971) is an English actress. She played the roles of Margaret Clemence in Brookside, Julie Fitzjohn in Holby City, Sarah Williams in The Chase, Allie Westbrook in Waterloo Road, and Tess Harris in Emmerdale.

== Life and career ==
She was born in Oldham, Lancashire and attended North Chadderton School for her secondary education.

=== Career ===
She is known mainly for her roles in television, which include Margaret Clemence in Channel 4's Brookside; Stephenson's on-air kiss with Anna Friel (Beth Jordache) was the first pre-watershed lesbian kiss to be broadcast on British television. In 2012 the kiss was broadcast to over 5 billion people when it was included as part of the London 2012 Olympics opening ceremony directed by Danny Boyle. The opening ceremony was broadcast uncensored in 76 countries where homosexuality is illegal and therefore became the first homosexual kiss to be broadcast in these countries. Other roles have included Julie Fitzjohn/Bradford in Holby City, Suzie Davidson in Clocking Off, Jackie Armstrong in ITV's Christmas Lights/Northern Lights/City Lights, Sarah Williams in BBC's The Chase and Helen Enright in All at Sea. In 2012, Nicola played Louise, a series lead in the ITV drama Homefront. In 2014 she joined the regular cast of Waterloo Road as art teacher Allie Westbrook for 11 episodes.

Her theatre roles include A Patriot for Me at the Royal Shakespeare Company, directed by Peter Gill, His Girl Friday and Edmund at the National Theatre, directed by Ed Hall, and War Horse at the New London Theatre in London's West End, directed by Marianne Elliot. In 2025 she played Dorothy Pizer in the play Liberation written by Zodwa Nyoni at Royal Exchange Theatre as part of Manchester International Festival.

In 2007, she had a lead role in the BBC TV 3 part series Superstorm directed by Julian Simpson. In 2014 she worked with Simpson again when he directed her as a guest lead in the BBC TV series New Tricks.

She appeared in the ITV drama Safe House in early 2015.

From 2015 to 2016, she played the part of Tess Harris in the soap-opera Emmerdale. Her five-month stint on the serial came to a sudden end when her character was killed off in a hit-and-run incident. Stephenson's role in the soap also reunited her with her co-star from The Chase, Gaynor Faye, who had played the character of Megan Macey since 2012.

== Filmography ==
=== Films ===
Year	Title	Role	Notes
1989	The Rainbow	Ethel	
1998	The Duke	Edith	Short film
1999	The Last Yellow	Karen	
2004	Nits	Mum	Short film
2004	Floating	Grace	Short film
2005	Mr John	Carol	Short film
2019	Tales from the Lodge	Amanda	
2023	Scoffed	Jane	Short film
2023	Stone	Rita Taylor	Short film

=== Television ===
Year	Title	Role	Notes
1988	Coronation Street	Priscilla Millbanks	Recurring role; 3 episodes
1990	Children's Ward	Amanda	Recurring role; 5 episodes
1990	Medics	Suzie	Episode: "Annie"
1990	The Final Frame	Louise	TV film
1990–1994	Brookside	Margaret Clemence	Series regular; 238 episodes
1994	Nice Day at the Office	Lizzie Kershaw	Series regular; 6 episodes
1995	Go Back Out	Sam	TV film
1996	Kiss and Tell	Alex Reynolds	TV film
1996	Out of the Blue	Lucy Shaw	Recurring role; 5 episodes
1997	Wokenwell	Fran Rainford	Series regular; 6 episodes
1997	The Bill	Julie Hicks	Episode: "Shades of Grey Part 1 & 2"
1998–1999	My Wonderful Life	Gail	Recurring role
1998–2001	Casualty	Julie Fitzjohn	Recurring role; 4 episodes
1999	Big Bad World	Jennifer	Episode: "What's Wrong with Bees?"
1999–2001	Holby City	Julie Fitzjohn	Series regular; 50 episodes
2002–2003	Clocking Off	Suzie Davidson	Recurring role; 11 episodes
2003	Without You	Jess	TV film
2004	Animated Tales of the World	Wife	Episode: "The Shoemaker's Son"
2004	Christmas Lights	Jackie	TV film
2005	The Afternoon Play	Nicola Passmore	Episode: "The Hitch"
2005	Dead Man Weds	Donna Havercroft	Recurring role; 4 episodes
2005	Waking the Dead	Julia Henderson	Episode: "Subterraneans"
2005	The Walk	Christine	TV film
2005	Legless		TV film
2006	Northern Lights	Jackie Armstrong	Series regular; 6 episodes
2006	All in the Game	Jennifer	
2006–2007	The Chase	Sarah Williams	Series regular; 20 episodes
2007	Superstorm	Sara Hughes	Miniseries; 3 episodes
2007	City Lights	Jackie Armstrong	Series regular; 6 episodes
2008	Hotel Babylon	Justine	Episode: "Series 3, Episode 1"
2008	Lark Rise to Candleford	Susan Braby	Episode: "Series 1, Episode 7"
2008	Clash of the Santas	Jackie Armstrong	TV film
2009	Law & Order: UK	Mandy Jackson	Episode: "Unloved"
2010	Strike Back	Diane Porter	Recurring role; 3 episodes
2010	Moving On	Lindsay	Episode: "Skin Deep"
2012	Life Stories	Megan's Mum	Episode: "Megan's Friend"
2012	Homefront	Louise Mancetta	Miniseries; 6 episodes
2013–2015	All at Sea	Helen	Series regular; 26 episodes
2014	New Tricks	Emily Fraser	Episode: "London Underground"
2014	Waterloo Road	Allie Westbrook	Series regular; 10 episodes
2015	Safe House	Ali Blackwell	Recurring role; 4 episodes
2015–2016	Emmerdale	Tess Harris	Series regular; 31 episodes
2017–2020	The Worst Witch	Julie Hubble	Recurring role; 25 episodes
2018	The Alienist	Maebh Connor	Recurring role; 3 episodes
2019	Agatha Raisin	Liz Jellop	Episode: "The Curious Curate"
2019	Midsomer Murders	Izzy Silvermane	Episode: "With Baited Breath"
2020	Silent Witness	Grace Beaty	Episode: "Hope"
2020	Broke	Marnie	Series regular; 6 episodes
2020	Dun Breedin'	Sandra	Miniseries; 1 episode
2021	Whitstable Pearl	Connie Rowe	Episode: "The Free Waters"
2022	Call the Midwife	Thelma Haig	Episode: "Series 11, Episode 3"
2022	The Dumping Ground	Delilah Fortune	Episode: "Saviour"
2022	The Walk-In	Renshaw's Mother	Miniseries; 3 episodes
2023	Maternal	Debbie Wares	Recurring role; 2 episodes
2023	London Kills	Kathy Lawrence	Episode: "Fallout"
2023	The Long Shadow	Olive Smelt	Miniseries; 3 episodes
2026	The Good Ship Murder	Erin Daniels	Episode: "Cannes"
TBA	The Siege	TBA	Upcoming drama series

== Personal life ==
Stephenson was in a relationship with actor Kieran O'Brien for eight years. The relationship ended in 1999. Stephenson has two daughters.
