= Mark Benton =

English actor and television presenter (born 1965)

- Born: 16 November 1965 (age 60); Guisborough, North Yorkshire, England
- Education: RADA
- Occupations: Actor, television presenter
- Television: Barbara (1999–2003); Waterloo Road (2011–2014); Strictly Come Dancing (2013); The Edge (2015); My Kitchen Rules (2016–2017); Shakespeare & Hathaway: Private Investigators (2018–)
- Spouse: Sarah Gardner (m. 2002)
- Children: 3

Mark Benton (born 16 November 1965) is an English actor and television presenter known for his roles as Eddie in Early Doors, Howard in Northern Lights, Martin Pond in Barbara and the eponymous Frank Hathaway in Shakespeare & Hathaway: Private Investigators. Benton has also starred in the BBC One school-based drama series Waterloo Road as mathematics teacher Daniel "Chalky" Chalk from 2011 to 2014. In 2013, Benton took part in Strictly Come Dancing; further, in 2015, he hosted the daytime game show The Edge.

== Early life ==
Benton was born in Guisborough, North Riding of Yorkshire, England. He attended Sarah Metcalfe Comprehensive School and, later, Stockton Billingham Technical College. Some of Benton's early acting experience came at Middlesbrough Youth Theatre with performances in plays such as Atmos Fear and Twist. He graduated from the Royal Academy of Dramatic Art (RADA) in 1990.

== Career ==
Benton has a recurring role as Father McBride in the series Murphy's Law and has worked with Vic and Bob in the series Randall and Hopkirk (Deceased), Catterick, and Monkey Trousers. In 1999, he played Mickey-O in "The Wedding", the last episode of series 5 of Ballykissangel. He also appeared as an earthly representative of the devil in the 2003 ITV drama The Second Coming and the 2005 ITV drama Planespotting. From 1999 to 2003, Benton played Martin Pond in the sitcom Barbara and Eddie in the sitcom Early Doors in 2003 to 2004. He has also starred in the BBC Three comedy I'm with Stupid and appeared in the Doctor Who episode "Rose" as conspiracy theorist Clive. In late 2008, Benton starred in the ITV drama Britannia High. From 2009 to 2011, he co-starred as Max de Lacey in Scoop. Benton also co-starred in the Roman Mysteries episode "The Slave Girl from Jerusalem".

Film roles include Ricky in Mike Leigh's Career Girls (1997), Phil in the 2001 cult British independent film Mr In-Between, and Vic in the British comedy Three and Out (2008). Benton featured in all three of The Booze Cruise episodes, with Martin Clunes and Brian Murphy, among others. In 1996 he appeared in Catherine's Cookson The Girl.

Benton played the role of the bank manager in a string of eight television commercials for the Nationwide Building Society, directed by Armando Iannucci, shown from 2004 to 2010.

In April 2008, Benton appeared as Jess Yates in the BBC Four drama Hughie Green, Most Sincerely.

Benton did the voiceover for the programme Street Doctor on BBC One.

Other roles have included Connor in Afterlife (2005), Dad in The Imaginarium of Doctor Parnassus (2009), Hustle (2010), and Farmer Finch in the BBC's Land Girls.

Benton joined the cast of BBC drama Waterloo Road in its seventh series as Daniel 'Chalky' Chalk, a maths teacher, until 6 March 2013. He returned for an episode in series 9.

In 2011, Benton appeared in The Railway Children at Waterloo Station in London as Mr Perks.

On BBC Radio 4, Benton starred as the optimistic title character Harvey Easter in Mr Blue Sky, written by Andrew Collins and broadcast in May and June 2011. A second series was due for May 2012. Benton has also played Fred the butcher in the televised series of episodes by Catherine Cookson.

In 2012, Benton appeared in the one-off special Panto! as Francis, the Director of the play. In July 2012, it was announced that Benton would star as Edna Turnblad in the 2013 UK tour of Hairspray the Musical, starting in February 2013 and finishing in September 2013.

In 2015, Benton appeared as Police Constable Walt Everett in the BBC daytime series Father Brown, episode 3.12 "The Standing Stones". He also appeared as Les in the "La Couchette", the first episode of the second series of anthology series Inside No. 9. In 2015, Benton presented the BBC One daytime game show The Edge for its first series, being replaced by Gabby Logan.

In 2016, UK progressive rock band Gandalf's Fist announced that Benton would voice several characters on their album The Clockwork Fable.

On 21 August 2016, Benton played Bottom in A Midsummer Night's Dream in the BBC prom 48 festival. Benton appeared as a bartender in the December 2016 Christmas special of British sitcom Outnumbered.

In 2017, he played Dennis Feldman in the ITV drama The Halcyon.

Since February 2018, Benton has appeared as Frank Hathaway, alongside actress Jo Joyner as Luella Shakespeare, in the new BBC daytime comedy drama Shakespeare & Hathaway: Private Investigators. Benton played the role of Eddie Rowbotham in episode 2 of the 20th series of Midsomer Murders ("Death of the Small Coppers").

=== Strictly Come Dancing and Celebrity Weakest Link ===
In September 2013, Benton became one of the contestants in the eleventh series of the BBC One show Strictly Come Dancing, where he was partnered with world dancing champion Iveta Lukosiute. The couple left the show on week 10 after losing the public vote. Mark Benton has been in the most consecutive dance-offs in Strictly history with the number of 4 weeks in a row. He was eliminated in the 4th dance-off.

On 2 March 2024, Benton competed against other contestants on general knowledge skills during the Celebrity Weakest Link game show ending up winning the contest and receiving £9,400 for his charity, the Heavy Metal Truants cycling charity group that raises money for the children's charities including Nordoff & Robbins, Childline, Teenage Cancer Trust, and Save The Children.

== Personal life ==
Benton has been married to Sarah Gardner since 2002; they have three children.

Benton is a supporter of Middlesbrough F.C.. He has featured in the club's official website advertising campaign to encourage other fans to renew their season ticket.

Benton is a fan of progressive rock bands including Cardiacs, Matt Stevens, King Crimson, Steven Wilson and The Fierce and the Dead.

== Filmography ==
=== Film ===
Year	Title	Role	Notes
1994	There's No Business	Barman	
1996	The Girl	Fred Loam	TV film
1996	Lord of Misrule	Antler Man	TV film
1997	Career Girls	Richard Burton	
1997	Dilemma	SWAT Team	
1998	The Sea Change	Derek	
1999	The Lost Son	Giant	
1999	Topsy-Turvy	Mr. Price	
1999	Last Christmas	Father Christmas	TV film
2001	Blow Dry	George	
2001	Nice Guy Eddie	Tony Bentley	TV film
2001	A Small Summer Party	Euros	TV film
2001	Mr In-Between	Phil	
2001	Murphy's Law	McBride	TV film
2001	Redemption Road	Sherbert Man	
2002	Crime and Punishment	Zosimov	TV film
2002	All or Nothing	Man at Bar	
2002	Out of Control	Governor	TV film
2003	The Booze Cruise	Dave Bolton	TV film
2003	Cheeky	Big Mick	
2004	The Reckoning	Sheriff	
2004	Lighthouse Hill	Peter	
2004	Monkey Trousers	Various roles	TV film
2004	Gladiatress	Stage Manager/Hermes	
2004	Quite Ugly One Morning	Darren Mortlake	TV film
2004	King of Fridges	Alan	TV film
2004	Christmas Lights	Howie	TV film
2005	Planespotting	Paul Coppin	TV film
2005	The Booze Cruise II: The Treasure Hunt	Dave	TV film
2006	The Booze Cruise III: The Scattering	Dave	TV film
2006	If I Had You	Harry Fielding	TV film
2006	Breaking and Entering	Legge	
2006	Magnolia	Gregg	TV film
2008	Hughie Green, Most Sincerely	Jess Yates	TV film
2008	Three and Out	Vic	
2008	Flick	Sgt. Miller	
2008	Clash of the Santas	Howie	TV film
2009	My Last Five Girlfriends	Alan	
2009	The Imaginarium of Doctor Parnassus	Dad	
2009	Beyond the Pole	Graham	
2012	Boys on Film 8: Cruel Britannia	Phil	
2012	Steppin' Out with Katherine Jenkins	Eddie Finch	TV film
2012	Panto!	Francis de Winter	TV film
2012	Apples	Lamppost 1	Voice role
2015	Danny and the Human Zoo	Syd Noble	TV film
2015	Eddie the Eagle	Richmond the BOA Official	
2015	National Theatre Live: As You Like It	Touchstone	
2017	Anna and the Apocalypse	Tony Shepherd	
2017	Ratburger	Gary	TV film
2018	Torvill & Dean	Ted	TV film
2021	Cyrano	Montfluery	
2022	Christmas Carole	Leon	TV film
2023	Secrets of a Wallaby Boy	Roland	
2023	The Devil Went Down to Islington	Barry Grossman	

=== Television ===
Year	Title	Role	Notes
1991–1992	Boon	Charlie Hardiman	Recurring role, 9 episodes
1992	Desmond's	Policeman	Episode: "Too Young"
1993	KYTV	Policeman	Episode: "Fly on the Walls"
1994	Moving Story	Detective Constable Halford	Episode: "Charlotte, Emma, Bamber & Anne"
1994	Finney	Billy	Series regular, 6 episodes
1995	The Bill	Patrick Hughson	Episode: "Hit and Miss"
1995	Kavanagh QC	Sergeant Redbridge	Episode: "Heartland"
1996	Roger and the Rottentrolls	Mook	Episode: "The Rubbish Monster"
1996	Screen Two	Ambulance Man	Episode: "Crossing the Floor"
1997	See You Friday	Bernie	2 episodes
1997	Dalziel and Pascoe	Jonathan Etherege	Episode: "Ruling Passion"
1997	All Quiet on the Preston Front	Richard	Episode: "Polson’s Mess"
1998	Kiss Me Kate	Client	Episode: "Calendar"
1998	The Jump	Timmy Lambert	Mini-series, 3 episodes
1999	Eureka Street	Chuckle	Mini-series, 4 episodes
1999	Ballykissangel	Mickeyo	Episode: "The Wedding"
1999–2003	Barbara	Martin Pond	Series Regular, 24 episodes
2000	As Time Goes By	Paul Partridge	Episode: "Going Online"
2000	Gimme Gimme Gimme	Bob Hobbs	Episode: "Stiff"
2000	This Is Personal: The Hunt for the Yorkshire Ripper	Terence Hawkshaw	Mini-series, 2 episodes
2000	Nature Boy	Fred	Mini-series
2000	Holby City	Gavin Cunningham	Episode: "Into the Woods"
2000	Randall & Hopkirk (Deceased)	Harry Wallis	Episode: "A Blast from the Past"
2000	Comedy Lab	Barry Anderson	Episode: "Anderson"
2000	Human Remains	Leighton	Episode: "All Over My Glasses"
2001	Dr. Terrible's House of Horrible	Sergeant Rohmer	Episode: "Frenzy of Tongs"
2001	Micawber	Ezra	Episode: "Micawber Learns the Truth"
2002	Breeze Block	Mr. Shields	Series regular, 6 episodes
2002	Nice Guy Eddie	Tony Bentley	Series 1, Episode 1
2003	The Second Coming	Johnny Tyler	Mini-series, 2 episodes
2003	Swiss Toni	Crazy Alan	2 episodes
2003	Clocking Off	Colin Wilkes	Recurring role, 5 episodes
2003	40	Gregory	Mini-series, 3 episodes
2003–2004	Murphy's Law	Father McBride	Recurring role, 6 episodes
2003–2004	Early Doors	Eddie	Series Regular, 12 episodes
2004	Family Business	Graham Kirk	Series 1, Episode 5
2004	Catterick	Mark	Series regular, 6 episodes
2004	Born and Bred	Mr. Ffotherington	Episode: "More Than You Know"
2005	Doctor Who	Clive	Series 1, Episode 1: "Rose"
2005	Twisted Tales	Trev	Episode: "Guardian"
2005	The Inspector Lynley Mysteries	Professor Elias Blackwell	Episode: "Word of God"
2005	Afterlife	Connor McClune	Episode: "Misdirection"
2006	Northern Lights	Howie	Regular role, 6 episodes
2006	Comedy Doubles	Commentator	Series regular, 6 episodes
2006	I'm with Stupid	Sheldon	Recurring role, 3 episodes
2007	Fallen Angel	Eddie	Episode: "The Four Last Things"
2007	City Lights	Howie	Series regular, 6 episodes
2007	The Street	Wayne Taylor	Recurring role, 4 episodes
2008	The Slammer	Mr. Beltham	Series 2, Episode 13
2008	Roman Mysteries	Floridius	Recurring role, 2 episodes
2008	Britannia High	Mr. Nugent	Series regular, 8 episodes
2009	Desperate Romantics	Mr. Chadwick	Mini-series, 2 episodes
2009	The Fixer	Leo Westbrook	Recurring role, 2 episodes
2009	Blue Murder	Neville Notts	Episode: "Inside"
2009	Personal Affairs	Iain Ebelthite	Mini-series, 5 episodes
2009–2011	Land Girls	Farmer Finch	Series Regular, 15 episodes
2009–2011	Scoop	Max de Lacey	Series regular, 39 episodes
2010	Hustle	Finch	Episode: "The Thieving Mistake"
2010	Coming Up	Phil	Episode: "I Don't Care"
2011	Silent Witness	Patrick Cain	Episode: "Lost"
2011	Inspector George Gently	Geoff Blackburn	Episode: "Goodbye China"
2011–2012	Mr Blue Sky	Harvey Easter	Series regular, 10 episodes
2011–2014	Waterloo Road	Daniel "Chalky" Chalk	Regular role, 49 episodes
2012	White Van Man	Kenny Knobbler	Episode: "Cupboard"
2013	Walk on the Wild Side	Various roles	Series 3, Episode 3
2014	The Job Lot	Gary Pickles	Series 2, Episode 6
2014	Psychobitches	Mrs. Noah	Series 2, Episode 3
2014	Educating Bitchfield	Mr. Lister	Episode: "School on Report"
2015	Father Brown	PC Walt Everett	Episode: "The Standing Stones"
2015	The Holidaymakers	Narrator	Regular role, 8 episodes
2015	Inside No. 9	Les	Episode: "La Couchette"
2015	BBC Comedy Feeds	Phil	Episode: "Fishbowl"
2015	Doctors	Mal McBride	Episode: "The Heart of England"
2016	Outnumbered	Brian	Christmas Special
2016	Damned	Mike	Series 1, Episode 5
2017	The Halcyon	Feldman	Series regular, 8 episodes
2017	Tracey Ullman's Show	Mayor Bob	Series 2, Episode 6
2018	Death in Paradise	Les Doyle	Episode: "The Stakes Are High"
2018	Midsomer Murders	Eddie Rowbotham	Episode: "Death of the Small Coppers"
2018–present	Shakespeare & Hathaway: Private Investigators	Frank Hathaway	Series regular, 50 episodes
2021	Vera	Stanley Booth	Episode: S11E2 "Recovery"
2021-2023	The Nevers	The Colonel	Recurring, 5 episodes
2022	Big Tree City	Major Prickles (voice)	6 episodes
2022	Dead Canny	Karl	Episode: "Pilot"
2022	The Read	Narrator	Episode: "The Day of the Sardine"
2022	Dodger	The Abbott	Episode: "Train"
2023	Grantchester	Sam "Mac" MacKenzie	Episode: "Series 8, Episode 6"
2024	Inside No. 9	Party Guest	Episode: "Plodding On"
2024–present	Smoggie Queens	Mam	12 episodes
2025–present	Patience	DCI Calvin Baxter	Series regular, 14 episodes
2026-present	The Dickie Show	Mam	Spin off of Smoggie Queens. Also appears as self in episode 4 as the celebrity guest.
