= Siân Reeves =

English actress

Siân Reeves is an English actress, known for her roles as Sydney Henshall in the BBC drama Cutting It, Sally Spode in the ITV soap opera Emmerdale and Charlie Wood in the ITV soap opera Coronation Street.

== Life and career ==
Reeves was born in West Bromwich, and was raised in Brewood, South Staffordshire. After being educated at Wolgarston High School in nearby Penkridge, she worked in a shoe shop until pursuing acting professionally.

In 1985, Reeves was cast as an original cast member of Les Misérables.

Reeves appeared in the BBC soap opera EastEnders in 2006 as Elaine Jarvis for five episodes. In March 2006, Reeves appeared in the BBC singing competition Just the Two of Us. Her singing partner was originally Rick Astley, but after he failed to turn up for the second rehearsal, he was replaced by Russell Watson, and the pair went on to win the series.

In 2007, Reeves suffered a backstage accident whilst rehearsing the play Vernon God Little at London's Young Vic theatre. A stage trapdoor had been left open, and she fell through it, onto a steel ladder, suffering a punctured lung and crushed ribcage, leaving her unable to move for 10 months.

From 2008 to 2011, Reeves appeared as office manager Gloria in two series of the BBC Three sitcom Lunch Monkeys. In July 2009, it was announced that Reeves would join the cast of the ITV soap opera Emmerdale, playing the role of villain Sally Spode. Also, in 2009, Reeves appeared as Hannah Temple in the BBC drama series Hope Springs.

From 2011 to 2014, Reeves portrayed Bianca in the Sky comedy drama Mount Pleasant.

In 2019, Reeves joined the cast of the ITV soap opera Coronation Street as Charlie Wood. Also, in 2019, Reeves played Marcia Fortby in Series 2, Episode 4 of Shakespeare & Hathaway: Private Investigators.

In 2022, Reeves won the Special Jury Award in Direction at the first season of Casablanca Film Factory Awards for her short film I Know Something Happened.

In 2026, Reeves played Kim Woods in Series 15, Episode 7 of Death in Paradise.

== Filmography ==
=== Film ===
Year	Film	Role	Notes
2000	Five Seconds to Spare	Tania	
2001	Intimacy	Woman at the Audition	
2001	Sweetnightgoodheart	Saffy	Short films
2004	No Deposit, No Return	Pat	Short films
2015	Muck	Babs	Short films
2015	Worst First Date	Jan	Short films
2016	The Mixture	Mrs. Godmother	Short films
2017	The Time of Their Lives	Sarah	
2018	What Happened to Evie	Evie's Mum	Short film
2018	Alexa and Me	Cheryl	Short film. Also director and producer
2020	Hello Darlin'	Carol Dalton	
2020	Feedback	Patricia	Short films
2022	I Live with the Devil	Sue	Short films
2024	Rejoice!	Jo Tyler	Short films
TBA	New George	Mizzi	Short film. Post-production

=== Television ===
Year	Film	Role	Notes
1992-1993	Storytime	Jess	
2000	Urban Gothic	Dr. Ellis	Episode: "Sum of the Parts"
2001	The Bill	Pat Spencer	Episode: "Eye of the Lens"
2001	In a Land of Plenty	Zoe	Mini-series; 9 episodes
2001	Making Astronauts	Sarah	Television film
2001	Swallow	Pauline	3 episodes
2002	Linda Green	Travel Rep	Episode: "Viva Espana"
2002–2005	Cutting It	Sydney Henshall	Series 1–4; 25 episodes
2003	This Little Life	Glenda	Television film
2003	The Bill	Jessica Andrews	Episode: "Power Trip"
2003	Holby City	Rachel Harvey	Episode: "Accidents Will Happen"
2004	Doctors	Catherine McCulloch	Episode: "Selling Souls"
2004	Where the Heart Is	Caroline Bins	Episode: "Body & Soul"
2004	Making Waves	CCMEA Eddie Worthy	Episode: "#1.6"
2006	Just the Two of Us	Herself - Contestant	8 episodes with Russell Watson – Winners
2006	Weakest Link	Herself - Contestant	Episode: "All Singing - All Dancing Edition"
2006	EastEnders	Elaine Jarvis	5 episodes
2006	Northern Lights	Pauline Scott	6 episodes
2007	City Lights	Pauline Scott	6 episodes
2008	Clash of the Santas	Pauline Scott	Television film
2008–2011	Lunch Monkeys	Gloria Stevens	Series 1 & 2; 13 episodes
2009	Hope Springs	Hannah Temple	8 episodes
2009–2014	Emmerdale	Sally Spode	75 episodes
2011–2014	Mount Pleasant	Bianca	Series 1–4; 34 episodes
2012	All Star Mr & Mrs	Herself - Contestant	Episode: "#4.10"
2014	Doctors	Fiona Dow	Episode: "Blink"
2015	Mountain Goats	Jane Lovely	Episode: "Lover"
2017, 2019	Casualty	Kim Harrison	3 episodes
2018	Still Open All Hours	Merle	Episode: "#4.2"
2018	Doctors	Cordelia Smithfield	Episode: "Practice What You Preach"
2019	Shakespeare & Hathaway: Private Investigators	Marcia Fortby	Episode: "Beware the Ides of March"
2019–2020	Coronation Street	Charlie Wood	11 episodes
2020	The Dumping Ground	Daphne Davis	Episode: "Shattered"
2022	Agatha Raisin	Olivia Jones	Episode: "There Goes the Bride"
2022	Cockney and Scouse	Marple	6 episodes
2023	Patterns	Glenda	Episode: "Reverse Catfish"
2023	The Following Events Are Based on a Pack of Lies	Claudia Rose	4 episodes
2026	High Hoops	Auntie Leena	Episode: "The School Photo Screen Away"
2026	Death in Paradise	Kim Woods	Episode: "#15.7"

=== Video games ===
Year	Film	Role (voice)	Notes
2011	The Witcher 2: Assassins of Kings - Enhanced Edition	Margot / Derae / Liva	English version
