= Margaret Clemence =

Fictional character from Brookside

- Brookside character
- Portrayed by: Nicola Stephenson
- Duration: 1990–1994
- First appearance: 14 September 1990
- Last appearance: 6 April 1994
In-universe information
- Occupation: Nanny
- Mother: Anne Clemence
- Sisters: Janet Clemence
- Uncles: Pat
- Aunts: Maureen

Margaret Clemence is a fictional character from the British Channel 4 soap opera Brookside, played by Nicola Stephenson. The character debuted on-screen during the episode broadcast on 14 September 1990. Margaret is characterised as a college drop-out unsure about her future. She leaves her home town of Oldham to escape her ex-boyfriend, Kieran (Andrew Shakos), and relocates to Liverpool. She takes a job working as a nanny for Max (Steven Pinder) and Patricia Farnham (Gabrielle Glaister) and becomes their lodger. Stephenson has described Margaret as a domestic and organised character but when it comes to romance she is confused and unstable.

Writers gave Stephenson a series of challenging storylines throughout her tenure, often involving taboo romances. In her first notable story, Margaret begins a relationship with a Catholic priest, Derek O'Farrell (Clive Moore). Their affair upsets various other characters, including Derek's sister, DD Dixon (Irene Marot), who attempts to sabotage their happiness. The two break up when Derek moves to work in Bosnia. The story prompted both complaints and praise from various religious and casual viewers. Undeterred by the controversy Margaret had already caused, Brookside creator Phil Redmond and executive producer Mal Young created another taboo romance. This time Margaret befriends Beth Jordache (Anna Friel) who develops romantic feelings and this culminates in a kiss. It was the first time a same-sex kiss between two females had aired pre-watershed in the United Kingdom. The story caused controversy, made television history and set a standard for other shows to follow. The scene has gained iconic status in LGBT culture and British television history. It also became one of Brookside's defining moments. Stephenson has labelled Margaret a heterosexual but her involvement with Beth caused her confusion. Stephenson left the series in 1994 and writers created yet more drama to facilitate her departure. Margaret has an affair with a married man, Carl Banks (Stephen Donald) but ultimately leaves for Bosnia to reunite with Derek.

== Development ==
=== Casting and characterisation ===
Stephenson began playing the character in 1990. It was her first ongoing television role. Like her on-screen counter-part, Stephenson is from Oldham. Margaret is a college drop-out who leaves her hometown of Oldham and moves to Liverpool. She takes a job as a nanny, working for Max (Steven Pinder) and Patricia Farnham (Gabrielle Glaister), minding their son Thomas. Margaret viewed the job as a temporary solution to earn money while she decided what to do in the future. One of her early stories featured Margaret getting into a disagreement with the Farnhams and she returns to Oldham. Margaret accuses Max and Patricia of taking advantage of her and they offer her a pay rise to stay. Stephenson described Margaret as a not at all ambitious; she is a "homely girl, a family girl, and nothing would make her more happier than having loads of kids." She also branded her "very domestic and organised", which Stephenson hoped to learn from. Margaret was introduced into the series when she was sixteen. Margaret falls in love easily and Stephenson said that due to her age "she's not in control of her emotions".

In her backstory, Margaret has "always been keen on boys". Her decision to move to Liverpool was motivated by her need to escape her ex-boyfriend Kieran (Andrew Shakos). He had wanted Margaret to get engaged and marry him but she was unwilling. Kieran was also "extremely physical" and made sexual advances, which left Margaret unsure about him. In the book, Brookside – The First Ten Years, Stephenson told author Geoff Tibballs that Kieran "was always trying it on with Margaret and she wouldn't let him come near." Another early story for Margaret was an attraction to Mike Dixon (Paul Byatt) but writers did not develop it into a romance.

=== Relationship with Derek O'Farrell ===
Writers created a forbidden romance between Margaret and a priest, Derek O'Farrell (Clive Moore). Derek was originally planned to appear in two episodes of Brookside. Producers extended Moore's contract after they saw the potential story between Margaret and Derek. The story was controversial because Margaret was only eighteen and Derek was a Catholic priest. The story had never been portrayed in a British soap opera before. Stephenson was originally unaware that Margaret and Derek would get together. Producers did not inform Stephenson of their long-term story plan. Even though the storyline was believable, she was apprehensive of how the it would be received by viewers. She branded it "a really good issue to cover and one that's never been done before." To prepare for the story, Stephenson researched real stories of priests having secret families. On-screen the story begins in 1991, when Margaret meets Derek and they soon become friends. Derek is the younger brother of DD Dixon (Irene Marot). They bond when they dismantle a wall that Derek's brother-in-law Ron Dixon (Vince Earl) built on Brookside Close. Tibballs, author of Phil Redmond's Brookside – Life in the Close wrote that Margaret likes Derek's "warmth and honesty and besides she felt safe with him." Margaret thought Derek was the one man who would not be interested in her romantically. She soon begins to develop romantic feelings for him and even travels miles to help him at his parish church.

Derek is initially unaware of Margaret's feelings and believes she wants to help the church. He soon realises her true intentions and warns that their friendship is endangering his career. Father Thornton and DD become suspicious of Margaret and Derek's friendship. Moore told Tibballs that it was a story about Derek "struggling mentally" with his feelings. He added that Derek "simply couldn't make up his mind. But then he realised that he had to face the truth – Margaret was more than a friend." Her mother, Anne Clemence (Christine Moore) also discourages the romance. Margaret does not take any of their advice which results in DD becoming hostile towards her. DD is a "zealous Catholic" and warns Margaret to stay away from her brother. She becomes convinced that Derek will ruin his career and schemes to keep them apart. Margaret confides in Patricia, who then allows the pair to have clandestine meetings in secret at the Farnham house. DD soon discovers their meetings and reports Derek to Father Thornton. Derek is posted to a new Parish in the Lake District and DD believes she has saved her brother. Margaret's mother antagonises her and subsequently she issues Derek with an ultimatum that he leave the church or lose her for good. On-screen Derek quits his priesthood and he officially begins a relationship with Margaret. DD blames Margaret for seducing her brother. Stephenson defended her character and believed that Margaret and Derek were both to blame. She told Tibballs that "I used to feel very sorry for Derek because he didn't ask for this extremely naïve girl to fall in love with him. But then he didn't do much to discourage her in the early stages of their relationship either. He was awfully friendly towards Margaret, and became quite flirtatious during one episode when he came in for coffee and helped her dry the pots."

Moore was wary about Margaret and Derek having a sexual relationship before marriage, given his religious views. He told Marsha Hanlon from TVTimes that "if you love somebody enough to give up everything, there's no way you should feel guilty about expressing that love." He added that Derek was initially apprehensive about having sex with Margaret, but "he's past that stage now". They decide to have sex despite Margaret being left with Thomas in her care. Patricia arrives home and catches Margaret and Derek in bed together. She is furious that they neglected Thomas, who had fallen ill while left alone in his bedroom. Stephenson could not defend her character's behaviour following the incident. She told Tibballs that "I'm afraid Margaret did rather neglect Thomas, so much so that she nearly got the sack." Patricia agrees to keep Margaret on as Thomas's nanny, but Max grows tired of her unreliable behaviour. When Margaret and Derek take a spontaneous trip away, Max is angry and decides to give Margaret's nanny job to Anna Wolska (Kazia Pelka) instead.

Margaret soon finds work as a nanny elsewhere and she agrees to marry Derek. They face more problems when they go public with their relationship and have to tell a hostile DD their plans. They also contend with Derek having no income, choosing to carry out voluntary work. Stephenson told Hanlon that Margaret feels guilty about Derek leaving his career. She also believed that at eighteen, Margaret was too young for marriage. She explained that "he's given up his whole life for her. Now she has to fill that void for him and she feels their relationship has to work." Stephenson described it as an "awful situation" to get into and opined that if she were Margaret, she would have told Derek to remain in the priesthood. Moore wanted the characters to have a happy ending because "they've been through so much". Stephenson concluded that she wanted them to have a "happy ending". Writers ended the story with the departure of Derek. With a lack of job prospects he decides to seek work Bosnia. Margaret agrees to leave with Derek but changes her mind at the airport. Margaret ends their relationship and Derek leaves without her.

Writers were concerned that the story would anger Catholics but the response was better than they had imagined. Brookside received complaints from Protestant viewers who were concerned that the affair was upsetting Catholics. Young himself revealed that the Catholic response was more positive. He recalled that many Catholics wrote anonymous letters and thanked him for exploring a taboo subject, which they had witnessed in their own parishes. Young himself was from a Catholic background and had a personal interest in the story. He told Geoff Tibballs, author of Brookside – The Early Years, that "people from my own parish were not slow to give me their criticisms of the story. We wanted to do the story sensitively – we didn't want Derek just dropping his trousers. I didn't want to shock just for the sake of it." Young concluded that the positive response from Catholic news outlets could have caused hurt in the community, though he stressed that Moore gave a responsible portrayal to remain sensitive to viewers. Stephenson has stated that she received letters urging Margaret and Derek to become a bona fide couple. The portrayal of priests as men with feelings was also well received. Moore initially received letters insisting that such stories do not happen to real priests.

=== Same-sex kiss ===
Another controversial story for Margaret was a same-sex kiss with Beth Jordache (Anna Friel). The storyline was devised by Brookside creator Phil Redmond and executive producer Mal Young. Friel had impressed the producers with her strong acting performance and they decided to reward her with a challenging storyline. They decided that Beth would explore her sexuality and they chose Margaret to feature in her story. Young told Tibballs that "Beth became the first lipstick lesbian and pairing her with Margaret worked because nobody would have expected it of Margaret, least of all Margaret herself." Writers began to develop the storyline with the creation of a close friendship between the two characters. As they bond, Beth begins to develop romantic feelings for Margaret. During the show's Christmas episodes of 1993, Beth's feelings intensify. Originally, Redmond was unsure about the storyline because it was then a taboo subject. Scriptwriter Shaun Duggan wrote the episodes featuring the kiss and those that preceded it. He wanted representation and was determined to get the story on television because he had recently come out.

The kiss was broadcast during the episode broadcast on 14 January 1994. The kiss lasted eight seconds, after which Beth jokes "well, neither of us has been struck by lightning yet." Beth is upset that Margaret does not act on her advances. Writers chose to portray Margaret as confused by the kiss but they ultimately remain best friends. Friel told Richard Arnold from Inside Soap that Beth was battling with self doubt and realised she really liked Margaret. They portrayed the kiss as a natural progression from this confusion. Friel added that "it's very scary for Margaret too because Beth is her best friend." Stephenson believed that Margaret was heterosexual and just confused about Beth. Friel said she was "terrible" during filming the scene because she kept laughing. She added that Stephenson managed to guide her through it with friendly advice. She concluded that the story was a positive addition to the show.

Brookside soon received praise from Gay and Lesbian groups, who thought Margaret and Beth's story was a "positive and non-cliched portrayal of lesbians". In the book, Phil Redmond's 20 Years of Brookside, author Graham Kibble-White stated that "lipstick lesbians" were more fashionable in the 1990s because of the characters. Young expected to receive numerous complaints about the story. He was also wary that the LGBT community would be annoyed that two straight men were telling stories about lesbianism. Young unexpectedly received letters from the gay community, praising them for their work. Young recalled receiving a letter from a mother, concerned that Brookside was trying to teach girls how to be lesbian. Young recalled that it gave him validation that he made the correct decision to broadcast the issue and educate viewers. He added "that's exactly why we did it – to overcome that sort of misconception." Friel also denied suggestions that Brookside was trying to compete with the rival soap opera Emmerdale, in which one of their characters, Zoe Tate (Leah Bracknell), was a lesbian.

Their kiss was watched by six million viewers. The kiss was edited out of the show's omnibus edition, which aired the following Saturday. While Brookside received numerous complaints about the kiss, more people complained about it being censored from the omnibus edition. The broadcast of their kiss was a ground-breaking moment in the history of the British television industry. It was the first lesbian kiss to air pre-watershed in the country. It was also the first time two women had kissed on a British soap opera. They were not the first same sex couple to kiss on British television pre-watershed, as rival soap opera EastEnders had featured two males kissing five years prior. It is often mistakenly cited as the first. The kiss has been described numerous times as an "iconic" television moment. Author Kibble-White detailed how the kiss had become an "iconic image" of not only Brookside, but of television drama in the 1990s.

At the 2012 Summer Olympics, during the opening ceremony a montage of British heritage was created by film producer Danny Boyle. Margaret and Beth's kiss was included in the montage, which was broadcast all around the world. It was broadcast live in seventy-six countries around the world where homosexuality is illegal. It was the first time a lesbian kiss aired on television in Saudi Arabia. American television network NBC faced accusations that they attempted to censor the kiss. Channel 4 later released the kiss episode for online streaming via their website.

In 2024, Stephenson reflected on the legacy the storyline had created. She never "anticipated the cultural significance this simple act would have." She revealed that she still had people thanking her for the story because it had helped them come to terms with their own sexuality. She added that the "opportunity" to portray the storyline "was a gift". Stephenson recalled that she and Friel felt a responsibility to portray the story accurately. She noted "it was important to us that this story, of two young girls exploring their sexuality, would come across as relatable and moving rather than oversexualised or titillating." Stephenson concluded that the impact the storyline had surprised her and she could never "have predicted the profound impact it would continue to have many years later."

=== Affair with Carl Banks and departure ===
Stephenson left the series in 1994, but prior to her departure writers created yet more controversy for her character. Margaret begins a sexual relationship with new character, Carl Banks (Stephen Donald). Their romance ends with the revelation that Carl is an army deserter with a wife, Sarah Banks (Andrea Marshall) and a daughter, Rebecca. When Beth begins a relationship with her college tutor Chris Myers (Marie Francis), Margaret becomes jealous of Chris. Stephenson told an Inside Soap reporter that Margaret's affair with Carl happened because Beth had moved on. She revealed that "the fling with Carl was obviously to get back at Beth for going off with Chris but I think she's straight and that deep down she likes men." With numerous love stories over her tenure, Margaret was portrayed as a confused woman unsure who to be with. Stephenson acknowledged that her character's confusion, adding that she is "not very stable". Stephenson noted that Brookside's stories are usually long running, but Margaret changed her mind "all of a sudden" on numerous occasions. She concluded that "after everything that's happened to her it's like she's gone mad." Off-screen, Donald received a negative response for the affair. He told Tibballs that "I got a fair bit of abuse from people on the streets for playing a scab and for when I was mucking around with Margaret."

In her final story, producers decided to reunite Margaret with Derek. On-screen the story begins when Patricia suggests she contact Derek in Bosnia and reconcile. She later decides to leave Brookside Close. Stephenson believed that Derek was the safest choice for Margaret. The actress stated that Margaret has "been hurt and abused so much that Derek's the only security that Margaret has." Stephenson revealed that viewers were still invested in Margaret and Derek's relationship. Of Margaret's departure, Stephenson concluded that "I get so much mail about them and I think fans are ready for a happy ending." On her decision to leave, Stephenson told Marion McMullen from the Coventry Telegraph that "at 22, with no kids, no mortgage and money in the bank, what had I got to lose?" Her final scenes aired in April 1994.

== Reception ==
Despite the controversy surrounding Margaret having an affair with a Catholic priest, praise was given from Catholic news outlets for the realistic portrayal. Marsha Hanlon from TVTimes said that "no one has ever accused Brookside of shying away from controversial subjects" but Margaret and Derek's "forbidden love affair" was a "shocking topic even for this daring soap." Margaret and Derek were included in Inside Soap magazine's "greatest love stories ever told" feature. A reporter categorised it as an "affair to remember" and branded her the "flame-haired nanny Margaret". An Inside Soap reporter opined that Margaret and Derek's relationship ended in "classic soap style" and that she had "lured" Derek away from his vows. A reporter from the Evening Standard stated that Margaret's story with Derek was one of many Brookside stories concerning Catholicism, which were the "bedrock of the soap". Of her romance with Carl, Geoffrey Phillips from the publication opined that "even by Brookside standards Margaret's latest experience of afterglow was short-lived. She has yet to learn that not every young man who says he enjoys the free and single life is free and single." Due to Margaret's controversial romances, Lorna Hughes of the Manchester Evening News quipped that Margaret "cornered the market in shocking clinches." A writer from Soaplife profiled Margaret, stating "Margaret Celemence came to Brookside as an innocent young nanny. But her liaisons in love were to become the talk of Brookie fans everywhere." They added that the "lesbian kiss stunned a nation of TV viewers."

In 1998, Inside Soap ran a feature compiling "The 100 greatest soap stories ever told". They featured Margaret and Beth's kiss as their 49th choice. In the book Real Soap: Brookside, author Kay Nicholls wrote "who could forget 'that' kiss between Margaret Clemence and Beth Jordache?" She also called it a "scandal" and "another first for the fab soap". Tilly Pearce of the Metro included the same-sex kiss in a feature of "landmark LGBT television moments". The kiss was voted 59th in a Channel 4 poll regarding the greatest television moments of all time. Vicky Spavin of the Daily Record called it one of the show's "moments of glory". Paddy Shennan underestimated the power of on-screen kisses because "everyone remembers" the kiss. As part of popular culture, the scene has been recreated by presenters of Radio 1, including Chris Moyles and Dominic Byrne. In the 1996 book, "The Guinness Book of Classic British TV", it was noted that Brookside handled lesbianism via Margaret and Beth's relationship with "sensitivity", adding it was "only marginally less contentious" than their storyline about Gordon Collins (Mark Burgess).

Stuart Jeffries from The Guardian stated that the same-sex kiss was "seen in 1994 by six million viewers, perhaps two of whom wrote to Channel 4 claiming this sweet, even diffident, snog transformed Merseyside into Sodom and Gomorrah." Jeffries opined that the kiss "really gripped the nation" and branded it as "a beautiful retort to the institutionalised bigotry of the previous decade." Jeffries concluded that it was an example of Brookside daring to tell the stories all other soap operas shied away from. Another reporter from the publication stated that it was "arguably Brookside's best-known moment." Their colleague Julie Bindel included it in a "top 10 lesbian kisses of all time" feature. Bindel explained that "it marked a change in attitude, and made many of us squeal with delight at lesbian love and passion featuring in a soap opera, between happy, functional teenagers as opposed to bitter and butch types." Gareth McLean (The Irish Times) praised Brookside for inclusion and said the wider news viewed lesbians differently and "sapphism suddenly became cool". In 2008, McLean was dismayed by the lack of lesbian characters on television. He stated that anytime the topic comes up, Margaret and Beth's kiss is always mentioned which "indicates the parlous state of lesbian representation."

In July 2017, Nisha Mal of Wales Online branded it one of the "most iconic kisses of all time". In December 2017, an Inside Soap reporter wrote that "the plot became one of Brookside's defining moments and paved the way for gay women in soaps." In January 2021, Hilary Mitchell from PinkNews said that the "enduring legacy" of Margaret and Beth's kiss could not be "understated". She noted that the kiss is often spoken about on Twitter, despite it being broadcast twenty-eight years earlier. She added "to say that kiss caused a huge sensation is a bit of an understatement, given how often it still comes up as a topic of conversation whenever the issue of LGBT+ representation on British TV comes up." Keiran Southern of the Belfast Telegraph branded the kiss "perhaps the most famous LGBT moment in British soap opera history". A HuffPost journalist wrote that they "kissed up a storm" and changed television history.
