= In Bed with Medinner =

British television series

In Bed with Medinner is a late-night British TV programme starring Bob Mills and originally broadcast in the 1990s. It is precursor to the contemporary Harry Hill's TV Burp, Russell Brand's Ponderland and Paddy McGuinness's Paddy's TV Guide. The title was a parody of Madonna's 1991 film In Bed with Madonna.

In Bed with Medinner was a London Weekend Television production for ITV. Stand-up comic Bob Mills specialised in a cynical view of life and its everyday objects, and in pastiches of popular culture icons.

The show was set in Mills' home, which was dressed to resemble the home of Number Six from The Prisoner and, in the final series, Steed's flat from The Avengers. The first three series opened with a parody of The Prisoner while the fourth and final series was re-titled Still In Bed With Medinner, and the opening sequence changed to be a parody of the classic Avengers Series Five title sequence.

Mills wanders around his flat (actually a studio set), telling ludicrous fictional anecdotes about his showbusiness friends and reminiscing about his (fictional) time as a television producer. These stories are illustrated by genuine clips from the ITV archives, which, interspersed with Mills' own heavily contrived commentaries and bizarre non-sequiturs, come together to reveal surreal fictional backstories.

The clips used in the show were found by a team of three researchers working for the programme. They searched through the London Weekend Television archival tapes, looking for any names that stood out, or made them look twice. They'd then watch the clips, and present Mills with a list.

== Original broadcasts and video releases ==
In Bed with Medinner ran from 1992 through to 1999, totalling 60 episodes: fifty-four 30-minute episodes and six 60-minute episodes.

- Series One consisted of two 30-minute specials shown 20 November and 27 November 1992.
- Series Two consisted of six 60-minute episodes and ran from 8 April to 13 May 1994.
- Series Three consisted of twenty-six 30-minute episodes and ran from 11 January to 22 November 1997.
- Series Four consisted of twenty-six 30-minute episodes and ran from 6 February to 24 April 1998 and 10 January to 25 April 1999.
- An hour-long compilation of highlights of the first and second series Wot a Palaver − The Best of In Bed with Medinner broadcast by London-area ITV on 2 August 1996, having been released on VHS on 26 September 1994.
