= Trevor Jordache =

Fictional character from Brookside

- Brookside character
- Portrayed by: Bryan Murray
- First appearance: 8 March 1993
- Last appearance: 7 May 1993
In-universe information
- Sisters: Brenna Jordache
- Wife: Mandy Jordache (until 1993)
- Daughters: Beth Jordache; Rachel Dixon
- Grandsons: Michael Dixon
- Granddaughters: Beth Dixon

Trevor Jordache is a fictional character from the British Channel 4 soap opera Brookside, played by Bryan Murray. The character debuted on-screen during the episode broadcast on 8 March 1993. The character only appeared for two months but was featured in one of Brookside's most controversial plots, the "body under the patio" storyline.

== Development ==
Murray was having a coffee with a friend at the Granada Television building. He then learned that Brookside's executive producer wanted to meet with him to discuss a role on the soap opera. Murray was offered the role of Trevor, a man who initially appears "perfectly innocent" but is secretly abusing his family. Trevor was murdered in the show's infamous body under the patio storyline. His wife, Mandy Jordache (Sandra Maitland), stabs him to death and their daughter Beth Jordache (Anna Friel) helps bury him under the patio, where he remained until he was accidentally dug up. When Trevor's body was discovered and removed from under the patio, he was played by a body double and television extra, Mike Woolley. He was buried up to his head and shoulders in the patio, in cold weather. He also played Trevor during a dream sequence experienced on-screen by Mandy, in which Trevor chases her through the house. Woolley was only seen from behind and was used because Murray's original footage was damaged by a hair on the camera lens.

Murray liked playing such a villainous character. In 2023, he told Michael Hogan from The Guardian that "when I read the scripts, I started to imagine what was going on in Trevor's mind. You have to try to get inside your character, no matter how monstrous they are. I enjoyed playing him, which might sound odd, but what a role." Trevor appeared in only twelve episodes, but Murray revealed that the viewers were very opinionated about him. Murray had abuse shouted at him in public, and received hate mail and threats of violence from strangers. Police received information Murray's life was at risk and intervened. Murray had a police escort who accompanied him between his home and the Brookside studios. Murray later recalled: "I thought they were having me on, but it was very serious." He added that characters such as Trevor make viewers feel emotions unlike others, which caused their threatening behaviour.

== Storylines ==
Prior to his introduction, Trevor was violent towards his wife, Mandy, and sexually abused his teenage daughter, Beth. He was imprisoned for assaulting his wife, but he had not been reported for abusing Beth. In 1993 Mandy, Beth and Rachel Jordache (Tiffany Chapman) arrived on Brookside Close in a "safehouse", as Trevor was due to be released from prison. Trevor traced them to the address after enquiring around the neighbourhood.

Trevor then approached his wife Mandy, who refused to take pity on him, but agreed to meet him at his bedsit. Upon seeing the squalor he had to live in and finding he had been burgled, Mandy naively allowed Trevor to stay at her house, much to the delight of Rachel and the disgust of Beth. During his stay at the Jordache house, Trevor bullied and beat Mandy, but was more cautious around Beth who showed open contempt for him. Beth was particularly cautious owing to her father's sexual abuse of her when she was younger. Fearing for Rachel's welfare, she kept an eye on her father. When she noticed that Trevor was abusing Rachel, she told Mandy. When Mandy confronted him, he told her that if she left he would kill her, their daughters and then himself. Later Trevor invited the neighbours around for a drinks party. Most of the neighbours gave false excuses, except for David (John Burgess) and Jean Crosbie (Marcia Ashton), who turned up out of sympathy for Mandy. During the party Trevor openly belittled Mandy, making the Crosbies feel uncomfortable and making them leave early. Trevor noticed this and was embarrassed. Blaming the incident on Mandy for allegedly badmouthing him to the neighbours, he viciously beat her.

On noticing her mother had been beaten by Trevor, Beth issued an ultimatum, telling her to throw Trevor out. Mandy refused, confessing to Beth that Trevor had threatened to kill them all should she do so. Upon realising this, Beth hatched a plan to kill Trevor, involving her reluctant mother. Beth and Mandy first tried to kill Trevor using weed-killer brought around by Sinbad (Michael Starke). When this failed, Beth started buying large amounts of pain-killers from Ron Dixon's (Vince Earl) shop and putting them into his food. This, however, served to make Trevor ill only. The pair persevered with this plan despite its failings, making Trevor more unwell each time.

During their final attempt Trevor caught the pair putting the pain killers into his drink. After confronting them, Beth told Trevor she hated him and wished he was dead. Trevor blamed Beth for turning Mandy against him and beat her in the kitchen. Upon seeing her daughter being beaten, Mandy picked up a kitchen knife and stabbed Trevor with it, killing him. Once Mandy and Beth realised Trevor was dead, Mandy became very distant, but Beth hatched a plan to dispose of Trevor's body. When night fell, the two wrapped him in bin liners and Beth buried him under the patio. Two years later, however, an underground leak forced the area to be dug up and Trevor's body was found by Eddie Banks (Paul Broughton) and Jimmy Corkhill (Dean Sullivan).

== Reception ==
Mikie O'Loughlin from RSVPLive.ie branded Trevor "one of the soap's biggest villains". Helen O'Callaghan from the Irish Examiner named him a "legendary Channel 4 villain". A RTÉ reporter similarly called him a "legendary Channel 4 soap villain" who "lay rotting under the patio for two dramatic years." Francesca Babb from All About Soap included Trevor's storyline in their "most memorable moments" of Brookside feature. She branded Trevor as "evil" and noted "who could ever forget the Jordache family?"
