= I'm a Dreamer Montreal =

I'm a Dreamer Montreal is a play by Stewart Parker. Parker's play won the Christopher Ewart-Biggs Memorial Prize. It was commissioned by BBC radio 3 in April 1975 and televised for ITV Playhouse in March 1979

In Belfast, where the play is set, music librarian Nelson Gloverby (Bryan Murray) lives in a dream world. A showband singer by night, he is unconcerned with his audience's irritation at his inability to stick to the proper lyrics. He is innocently drawn into the brutality of the Troubles when he meets siren Sandra Carse (Jeananne Crowley). His world having been turned around, he takes the bus home. The bus driver is singing the lyrics "I'm a dreamer, Montreal"; however, this time it is Nelson who points out the correct lyrics: "I'm a Dreamer, Aren't We All?"

The play title derives from a pun by the Marx Brothers in the film Animal Crackers (1930). Groucho asks his brother to "play the song about Montreal". Chico asks, "Montreal?, and Groucho replies, "I'm a dreamer, Montreal." The pun on the true title of the 1929 song, "I'm a Dreamer, aren't we all?" has been much-recycled not least by Parker. An early popular recording was by Paul Whiteman and His Orchestra on October 16, 1929, with a vocal group including Bing Crosby and this reached the charts in 1929.
