= Northern Lights (TV series) =

- Created by: Bob Mills; Jeff Pope
- Starring: Robson Green; Nicola Stephenson; Linzey Cocker; Lee Worswick; Alex Rimmer; Mark Benton; Siân Reeves; Maisie Breakenridge
- Country of origin: United Kingdom
- Original language: English
- No. of seasons: 1
- No. of episodes: 6

Production
- Executive producers: Andy Harries; Jeff Pope
- Producers: Bob Mills; Jeff Pope; Spencer Campbell
- Camera setup: Multi Camera Set-Up
- Running time: 60 minutes (with commercials), approx 47–50 minutes (without commercials)

Original release
- Network: ITV
- Release: 16 January – 20 February 2006

Related
- Christmas Lights; City Lights

Northern Lights is a 2006 comedy-drama broadcast on ITV starring Mark Benton and Robson Green. It is a spin-off of the 2004 Christmas special Christmas Lights.

A sequel, City Lights, was broadcast in 2007. Furthermore, a Christmas special, Clash of the Santas, was broadcast in December 2008. It features Colin and Howie taking a trip to Lithuania to represent the United Kingdom in a Santa convention. The problem is that miserable Howie is picked as Santa, while true Christmas believer Colin is relegated to the role of cheerleading elf.

== Cast ==
- Robson Green as Colin: Colin Armstrong is a cheeky-chappy. Colin's life revolves around spending time with his family and hanging around with his friends in the pub. Colin's best friend is Howard. While he respects Howard greatly, he has the tendency to get jealous over his successes. Very happily married, he and Jackie have three children: Brooke, Liam and Leyton.
- Mark Benton as Howie: Howard Scott is friendly and patient – a "gentle giant" who has always been there to support the people he is close to. He and Colin share the same juvenile sense of humour and competitive nature. Howie is less self-confident than Colin, but is capable of defending himself when he needs to. Recently promoted to management at work, he is keen to better himself and provide the luxuries of life for his wife, Pauline, and baby daughter, Victoria.
- Nicola Stephenson as Jackie: Jackie Armstrong is caring, dependable and intelligent. She loves Colin deeply, yet does not always approve of his devil-may-care approach to life. Jackie is very close to her sister Pauline, and they enjoy living next door to each other and combining their families' lives. When Colin and Howie are feuding, this can lead to the sisters' diplomatic skills being stretched to extremes, but the girls always stay united despite their husbands' antics.
- Sian Reeves as Pauline: Pauline Scott is shy compared to her sister and has a traditional outlook on life. She is fiercely protective of her family. She is torn between enjoying the perks that Howie's salary now allows and being unsettled by the changes it also brings. She gave birth to baby Victoria 18 months ago and, as the series starts, is on a quest to get her and Howie's sex life back on track.
- Linzey Cocker as Brooke: Brooke Armstrong is the eldest of the three children and is the only daughter. She soon gets a boyfriend, but tries to hide it from her mum. Brooke is like a mother to her brothers.
- Keith Clifford as Eric: Eric Foulkes is the father to Jackie and Pauline, and he has recently retired as foreman at Sherpa Freight where his sons-in-law still work, and is fondly remembered by staff. He now splits his time between babysitting for the two families and his allotment.
- James Midgley as Nigel: Nigel Cockburn, Colin's arch-enemy, is stern, arrogant and highly passionate on climbing the career ladder at Sherpa Freight.
- Russell Dixon as Len: "Old-school", Len Guthrie is often the voice of reason to counter Cockburn's management style. Respectful of his hard-working staff, he is a champion of both Howie and Colin over the course of the series.

== Episodes ==
No.	Title	Original release date	Prod. code
1	"Episode 1"	16 January 2006	#NL101
Colin and Jackie splash out on a holiday to Florida but then Colin fails an alcohol test and gets fired from Sherpa Freight. Meanwhile, Pauline feels neglected by Howie, and Colin's daughter, Brooke, gets a new boyfriend.
2	"Episode 2"	23 January 2006	#NL102
Colin is still job hunting so he takes work at the local taxi firm. However, he finds himself being mugged by teenagers, cheated by an OAP, and terrorised by a 12-year-old, and when Brooke goes missing, Colin fears the worst. Meanwhile, Howie is offered his job back, which causes a rift between him and Colin.
3	"Episode 3"	30 January 2006	#NL103
Colin and Howie go to a school reunion in Newcastle and Howie hooks up with an old flame. Colin is torn between supporting his friend or telling Pauline, and Howie must decide whom he really loves.
4	"Episode 4"	6 February 2006	#NL104
To show that he can be more than just a van driver, Colin becomes the new captain of the Sherpa Freight's football team, but when the power goes to his head, he begins losing friends, especially Howie. Meanwhile, the landlord of the local pub takes a shine to Jackie when she joins the snooker team.
5	"Episode 5"	13 February 2006	#NL105
Colin's father dies and his father-in-law has a heart attack. Pauline and Jackie discover some secrets concerning their father and Sherpa Freight receptionist Jean. Meanwhile, Colin's brother Patrick arrives; however, tension rises between the two brothers, with Howie stuck in the middle.
6	"Episode 6"	20 February 2006	#NL106
Colin and Howie take the family to the countryside for the weekend. Jackie and Pauline find out they have a long lost sister, who turns out to be a lesbian. Meanwhile, Colin and Howie head off for a day of fishing, but the trip soon relocates to the local pub, where they make a big impression on the locals. The boys get drunk and disturb a shotgun-wielding farmer who attempts to hunt them down.
