= Bryan Murray (actor) =

Irish actor (born 1949)

- Born: 13 July 1949 (age 76); Dublin, Ireland
- Occupation: actor
- Known for: Fair City, Brookside, The Irish R.M.

Bryan Murray (born 13 July 1949) is an Irish actor. He is known for his extensive television work which includes Fitz in Strumpet City, Flurry Knox in The Irish R.M., Shifty in Bread (for which he won BBC TV Personality of the Year), Harry Cassidy in Perfect Scoundrels, Trevor Jordache in Brookside and Bob Charles in Fair City.

== Early life and theatre career ==
Murray was born in Dublin, Ireland. As a stage actor, he began his career in Dublin at the Abbey Theatre where, as a member of The Abbey Company, he appeared in over 50 productions. In London, he has been a member of The Royal National Theatre, The Royal Shakespeare Company and has been in many productions in the West End. He has appeared many times at the Gate Theatre in Dublin, most recently in 2013 in My Cousin Rachel adapted for the stage by Joseph O'Connor. In the 2010 Dublin Fringe Festival, he appeared in the award-winning production of Medea at The Samuel Beckett theatre.

== Television ==
Murray is known for his extensive television work which includes Fitz in Strumpet City, Flurry Knox in The Irish R.M., Shifty in Bread (for which he won BBC TV Personality of the Year), Harry Cassidy in Perfect Scoundrels, Trevor Jordache in Brookside and Bob Charles in Fair City. He appeared on the second season of Charity You're a Star where he sang duets with his Fair City co-star Una Crawford O'Brien. The duo were voted off the show after performing "Don't Go Breaking My Heart". He played the role of Lynch in the film, A Portrait of the Artist as a Young Man (1977).

Murray has presented the documentary for TV3 The Tenements, a four-part series charting the rise and fall of the Tenements in Dublin from the 1800s to the mid-1970s. He fronted the BBC1 children's religious affairs programmes Knock Knock and Umbrella for three years. On RTÉ, he had his own prime time TV talk shows Encore and Caught in the Act and presented Saturday Night Live. His nine-part radio series The Sound of Movies was aired on RTÉ Radio 1 in 2008. He has also been a semi regular presenter of Late Date on RTÉ Radio 1. In the US, he presented the 'Irish Spring' commercial on network TV for six years, the award-winning 'Pioneer Press' commercials for three years and hosted the St Patrick's Day Parade for PBS Television. His series The Big House was shown on TV3 in the spring of 2013.

He co-created and co-devised the ITV series Perfect Scoundrels which ran for three years. He has co-written two musicals performed at the Abbey Theatre, Dublin, and Irish Theatre Company Dublin; A Happy Go Likeable Man, after Molière, and Thieves Carnival, after Anouilth. Most recently Murray took part in the 'One City One Book' celebration Bread and Roses; Strumpet City Revisited reading extracts from the book with the RIAAM orchestra playing the theme music from the TV series conducted by the composer Proinnsias O'Duinn at Dublin Castle.

== Notable roles ==
- Trevor Jordache in Brookside
- Mr James Roberts in Casualty and Holby City
- Harry Fullerton in The Bill
- Shifty Boswell in Bread
- Flurry Knox in The Irish R.M.
- Harry Cassidy in Perfect Scoundrels
- Bob Fitzpatrick in Strumpet City
- Officer Doyle in Mrs. Santa Claus
- Bob Charles in Fair City

Although Murray's mainstream work increased in the eighties due to his roles of Flurry Knox in The Irish R.M. and Shifty Boswell in the BBC sitcom Bread, his role in Brookside is perhaps his best known, despite the character appearing in the show for only eleven episodes. His character, a wife beater and a child abuser Trevor Jordache, was stabbed and killed by his wife, Mandy (Sandra Maitland), she and daughter Beth (Anna Friel) later buried his body under the patio, where it was discovered in 1995.

He portrays Bob Charles, the once owner of McCoys pub but now the owner of The Hungry Pig restaurant, in the RTÉ soap opera Fair City.

== Filmography ==
=== Film ===
Year	Film	Role	Director	Notes
1971	Here Are Ladies		John Quested	Short film
1977	A Portrait of the Artist as a Young Man	Lynch	Joseph Strick	
1998	The Disturbance at Dinner	Narrator	Greg Akopyan; Lawrence Kane	
2000	Wonderland...It Ain't	Dad	Lawrence Kane	Short film
2005	Boy Eats Girl	Mr. Frears	Stephen Bradley	
2010	Love on the Line	Jack	Bernadette McCarthy	
2011	10 Arenas of Marwood	Dr. Goode	Michael Audreson	
2012	A Christmas Carol	Jacob Marley	Jason Figgis	
2014	Dinner For One		Kevin McGee	Short film
2017	Torment	John	Jason Figgis	
2018	Vita & Virginia	Doctor	Chanya Button	
2019	The Professor and the Madman	Henry Liddell	Farhad Safinia	

=== Television ===
Year	Title	Role	Notes
1978	Betzi	Barry O'Meara	Television film
1979	ITV Playhouse	Nelson	11.02 "I'm a Dreamer Montreal"
1980	Strumpet City	Fitz	Television miniseries
1980	Premiere	Private Semple	4.01 "Rifleman"
1981	Bread or Blood	Pope	1.03 "Childhood"; 1.04 "Bread"; 1.05 "Blood"
1981	Play for Today	Terry	12.05 "Iris in the Traffic, Ruby in the Rain"
1982	Dead Ernest	Saint Patrick	1.02 "Episode Two"
1982	Harry Carpenter Never Said It Was Like This		Television film
1982	The Year of the French	Ferdy O'Donnell	1.06 "Episode Six"
1983-1985	The Irish R.M.	Flurry Knox	18 episodes
1983	Play for Today	George McQuiston	13.10 "Gates of Gold"
1985	Oscar	George Bernard Shaw	1.01 "Gilded Youth"; 1.02 "Trials"; 1.03 "De Profundis"
1986	The Return of the Antelope	Chimney Sweep	2.01 "Brelca Goes Ballooning"
1988	Ten Great Writers of the Modern World	James Joyce	1.01 "James Joyce's 'Ulysses'"
1988	Final Run	Michael / Danny	4 episodes
1988-1991	Bread	Shifty Boswell	49 episodes
1988	The Franchise Affair	Kevin McDermott	1.06 "Episode Six"
1990-1992	Perfect Scoundrels	Harry Cassidy	18 episodes
1996	Mrs. Santa Claus	Officer Doyle	Television film
1997	The Bill	Special Officer Paul Wellsted	13.127 "Shades of Grey: Part One"; 13.128 "Shades of Grey: Part Two"
1998-1999	Casualty	Mr. James Roberts	13.13 "One from the Heart"; 13.16 "Making a Difference"; 13.20 "White Lies, White Wedding"
1999	Holby City	Mr. James Roberts	1.01 "Whose Heart Is It Anyway?"; 1.03 "Kill or Cure"
1999-2000	Glenroe	Mike O'Shea	17.14 "Venetia Thinks It Over"; 17.17 "The Old Triangle"
2002	The Bill	Harry Fullerton	13 episodes
2004	Proof	Miles Carrick	4 episodes
2004	Silent Witness	David Kelman	8.01 "A Time to Heal: Part 1"
2005	The Baby War	Connor	Television film
2005-2025	Fair City	Bob Charles	211 episodes
2007	The Tudors	Jean De Bellay	1.07 "Message to the Emperor"
2019	Bridget & Eamon	Antiques Expert	4.05 "The Vase"

== See also ==
- List of Fair City characters
- List of longest-serving soap opera actors#Ireland
