= Christmas Lights (film) =

2004 television film

Christmas Lights is a 2004 British Christmas television special broadcast by ITV starring Robson Green and Mark Benton and written by Jeff Pope and Bob Mills. Although originally produced as a one-off 90-minute special, it spawned two spin-off series, Northern Lights and City Lights, and a 2‐hour Christmas special, Clash of the Santas, which aired on ITV on 21 December 2008.

The programme was watched by 10.5 million viewers. It is a comedy drama about what might happen when families forget what the festive season is about. Competitive brothers-in-law Colin and Howard live next door to each other on a suburban street, so when Colin puts Christmas lights outside his house, Howard responds with a bigger and brighter set, unleashing a war of twinkling light-bulbs and neon displays that threatens to ruin both families. It stars Robson Green, Mark Benton, Nicola Stephenson, Maxine Peake and Keith Clifford.

== Cast ==
- Robson Green as Colin Armstrong
- Mark Benton as Howard Scott (Howie)
- Nicola Stephenson as Jackie Armstrong
- Maxine Peake as Pauline Scott
