= City Lights (2007 TV series) =

British television series

- Starring: Mark Benton; Robson Green
- Country of origin: United Kingdom
- Original language: English
- No. of seasons: 1
- No. of episodes: 6

Production
- Executive producer: Andy Harries
- Producer: ITV Productions
- Editors: Paul Machliss; Xavier Russell
- Running time: 60 minutes

Original release
- Network: ITV
- Release: 4 April – 9 May 2007

Related
- Northern Lights; Clash of the Santas

City Lights is a British comedy-drama broadcast on ITV starring Robson Green and Mark Benton. The show is a sequel to the 2006 series Northern Lights (itself a spin-off of the Christmas special Christmas Lights), and a prequel to the 2008 TV film Clash of the Santas.

== Plot ==
As in the previous series, Green and Benton play Colin Armstrong and Howie Scott, two best friends since childhood who are married to two sisters, Jackie (Nicola Stephenson) and Pauline (Siân Reeves). The series begins with the two friends being the only witnesses to a gangland shooting, and after the police fail to catch the culprit, and the families' houses are set alight, they are forced to go into the witness protection programme, which relocates them to London. They are forced to change their names, with Colin choosing Brad Shearer, a reference to Newcastle United F.C. player Alan Shearer, and Howie choosing the name Duncan Carr, not realising he did not have to stick to the suggestion list. He requests a change of name but it is too late. He decides to get people to call him by his middle name, Wayne, but then realises that it now sounds like the curse word "wanker".

It is also revealed that Pauline is having an affair with a workmate, although Howie is unaware of this. This develops later in the series as, separated from her lover, she develops an attraction to the police officer who first dealt with their case, DS Tate, failing to realise that he is being blackmailed by the criminal who is after the two families, Sweeney, who has bought up his gambling debts.

As the problems between the two families worsen, Colin and Howie make numerous accidental references to others that reveal their true names and origins. Both of their relationships with their wives also become strenuous after it is revealed that Colin was married before marrying Jackie, yet never revealed this to her. Howie is also in trouble, as he was best man at the wedding and failed to disclose the fact to Jackie or Pauline.

While Jackie forgives Colin, Howie and Pauline's relationship seems to be over after she disappears without trace, spending the day with DS Tate, unaware that he is revealing her location to Sweeney. However, DS Tate changes his mind and decides not to take her to an agreed meeting place with Sweeney. Pauline phones Howie to tell him that their relationship is over, unaware that her call is being listened to by the police, who believe that she has been kidnapped.

Pauline then spends the night with DS Tate, giving him the opportunity to read her address from a piece of paper in her handbag. Meanwhile, Howie and Colin become traffic wardens, and Colin accidentally gives his idol David Ginola a parking ticket. Partially as a result of this, they resign their positions as traffic wardens and Colin buys a large quantity of gardening equipment, proposing that they set up a landscape gardening business.

After discovering that Pauline is having an affair, Howie trails her to a hotel where she is with DS Tate; however, they are caught and kidnapped by Sweeney's thugs. They are taken before Sweeney, who demands they return the drugs they "stole" from him. Howie and Colin lead Sweeney's thugs on a false trail to find the drugs.

The police find out that the person Pauline has been contacting is DS Tate, and immediately interrogate her about it. Meanwhile, Sweeney's thugs take Howie and Colin back to Sweeney's caravan, where DS Tate is waiting for them, ready to shoot them both. DS Tate, Howie and Colin escape after fooling Sweeney's thugs into thinking Tate actually shot them; rather, he poured tomato ketchup over them to make it look like blood. One of the thugs kills the other, and claims that he will make it look like the thug and Tate shot each other – "After all, you were shagging the big guy's wife". Howie and Colin hear this, overpower the thug and take his gun, before throwing him into the back of a nearby car. They drive to the airfield where Sweeney is about to leave in a plane, and mistakenly stop the wrong plane; however, the police arrive and stop the plane carrying Sweeney. Tate is arrested for conspiring to kidnap, and Colin and Howie return to the safe house, where Colin collapses and it transpires that, after Sweeney's thug kicked him earlier, he had a ruptured spleen. Colin thinks he has been given the "snip"; however, it is explained that he had a splenectomy and is not able to have the "snip". Jackie reveals that she is pregnant, and Colin and Howie decide to stay in London.

== Episodes ==
No.	Title	Original release date	Prod. code
1	"Episode 1"	4 April 2007	001
2	"Episode 2"	11 April 2007	002
After witnessing the shooting of a physcotic gangster, Colin and Howie are forced into witness protection, and everyone is made to start a new life. Sweeney, the gangster in question, sends his two faithful henchmen after the best friends. Meanwhile, Pauline cannot bear to leave her life behind – and her secret lover.
3	"Episode 3"	18 April 2007	003
The two families are moved to a safe house in London, where Jackie discovers a dark secret from Colin's past that could rip the couple apart for ever, while Howie fears that his marriage could be on the verge of ending as Pauline blames him for everything that has happened, and Brooke goes to extreme measures to contact her boyfriend. Meanwhile, DS Gary Tate's gambling debts make him the perfect man to entrap Howie and Colin for Sweeny, Hatton and Gully.
4	"Episode 4"	25 April 2007	004
Both Colin's and Howie's marriages are falling apart. Whereas Colin manages to win back Jackie, Pauline makes a heartbreaking decision that will change the two families for good, and after another argument, she seeks solace in the arms of a familiar face. Meanwhile, Sweeney sends his heavies to put pressure on DS Gary Tate, but will he give them the information that could seal Howie and Colin's fate?
5	"Episode 5"	2 May 2007	005
Colin and Howie becomes traffic wardens, and Howie gains a new admirer. Jackie is unable to have sex with Colin because she cannot forget about his ex-wife, so Collin tries to spice up their love life. Meanwhile, Pauline struggles to resist DS Gary Tate after their passionate night, and the pair begin an affair, which convinces Pauline that there is no way back for her and Howie's marriage. Heartbroken by this, Howie leaves the safehouse, which results in tension between Colin and Pauline.
6	"Episode 6"	9 May 2007	006
Colin and a depressed Howie launch a gardening business. Collin lets slip to Howie that Pauline may have a new man. Howie heads off to confront her mystery man. At the same time, Hatton and Scully decide to gatecrash Pauline and Tate's sex session, sparking a chain of events that leaves everyone's life in danger.
