= Strumpet City =

1969 novel by James Plunkett

- First edition
- Author: James Plunkett
- Language: English
- Genre: Historical fiction
- Publisher: Hutchinson
- Publication date: 1969
- Publication place: Ireland
- Pages: 576
- ISBN: 0-09-918750-7

Strumpet City is a 1969 historical novel by James Plunkett set in Dublin, Ireland, around the time of the 1913 Dublin Lock-out. In 1980, it was adapted into a TV drama by Hugh Leonard for RTÉ, Ireland's national broadcaster. The novel is an epic, tracing the lives of a dozen characters as they are swept up in the tumultuous events that affected Dublin between 1907 and 1914. The title refers to strumpet, a slang term for prostitute.

== The Risen People ==
The novel's roots date from 1954, when Plunkett's radio play Big Jim was produced by Radio Éireann, with Jim Larkin the titular hero. In 1958, it was expanded into a gloomier and more stylized stage play, The Risen People, staged at the Abbey Theatre. Kathleen Heininge characterises it as a dry work which read as "pure propaganda for a socialist agenda". When Hutchinson requested a novel about James Connolly from Plunkett, he reworked the play again; Connolly does not feature in Strumpet City, published in 1969. The Risen People was revived and revised in 1977 for the Project Arts Centre and Jim Sheridan. A 2013–14 revival at the Abbey included "the Noble Call", a speech in response to the play's themes from a different public figure at each performance. Panti Bliss' speech on LGBT rights in Ireland at the closing performance attracted media attention.

== Reception ==
It was immensely popular when it was published. The writing is direct and powerfully evokes the over-population, the terrible poverty and the peculiar intimacy of pre-independence Dublin. One theme is the essential goodness of people and the tenderness which survives the brutality of deprivation. The popularity of the novel also owed something to events in Ireland in the early 1970s, as The Troubles made the more traditional iconography of the insurrectionary period troublesome, while economic stagnation and social crisis fostered empathy for the former Dublin of tenements, working class heroes and vagrant balladeers.

In 2013 Dublin City Libraries chose Strumpet City as its “One City One Book” book of the year, in commemoration of the centenary of the 1913 Lockout.

On 5 November 2019, BBC News included Strumpet City on its list of the 100 most influential novels.

== See also ==
- Strumpet City (miniseries), the 1980 RTÉ TV miniseries adaption
