= James Plunkett =

Irish writer (1920–2003)

- Born: James Plunkett Kelly; 21 May 1920; Dublin, Ireland
- Died: 28 May 2003 (aged 83); Dublin, Ireland
- Occupations: Writer, playwright
- Writing career
- Pen name: James Plunkett

James Plunkett Kelly, known professionally as James Plunkett (21 May 1920 – 28 May 2003), was an Irish writer. He was educated at Synge Street CBS.

Kelly grew up among the Dublin working class and they, along with the petty bourgeoisie and lower intelligentsia, make up the bulk of the characters in his works. His best-known works are the novel Strumpet City, set in Dublin in the years leading up to the lockout of 1913 and during the course of the strike, and the short stories in the collection The Trusting and the Maimed. His other works include a radio play on James Larkin, who figures prominently in his work.

During the 1960s, Plunkett worked as a producer at Telefís Éireann. He won two Jacob's Awards, in 1965 and 1969, for his TV productions. In 1971 he wrote and presented "Inis Fail – Isle of Destiny", his very personal appreciation of Ireland. It was the final episode of the BBC series "Bird's-Eye View", shot entirely from a helicopter, and the first co-production between the BBC and RTE.

He was a member of Aosdana.

A first-year class, "1 Plunkett" at Synge Street CBS, is named in honour of James Plunkett.

== Works ==
=== Radio plays ===
- Dublin Fusilier (March 1952),
- Mercy (June 1953),
- Homecoming (April 1954),
- Big Jim (1955),
- Farewell Harper (1956).

=== Novels ===
- Strumpet City (1969)
- Farewell Companions (1977)
- The Circus Animals (1990)

=== Places ===
- The Gems She Wore (1972)

=== Short story collections ===
- The Trusting and the Maimed (1955)
- Collected Short Stories (1977)

=== Play ===
- The Risen People (1978)
