= Leo Johnson (Brookside) =

Fictional character from Brookside

- Brookside character
- Portrayed by: Leeon Sawyer (1990–1996); Steven Cole (1996–2001)
- Duration: 1990–2001
- First appearance: 26 March 1990
- Last appearance: 11 April 2001
- Created by: Phil Redmond
In-universe information
- Occupation: Police officer
- Father: Mick Johnson
- Mother: Josie Brooks
- Sisters: Gemma Johnson
- Half-brothers: Andre Clark
- Half-sisters: Vicky Grant
- Grandfathers: Ben Christie
- Grandmothers: Rachel Christie
- Uncles: Ellis Johnson
- First cousins: Jerome Johnson

Leo Johnson is a character in Channel 4 television soap opera Brookside. He was played by Leeon Sawyer when the character arrived on the Close in March 1990 until September 1996. Then, Steven Cole took over the role from December 1996 where his character stayed until his departure in April 2001.

== Storylines ==
=== The Johnsons ===
The Johnsons are first introduced in 1989 when Terry Sullivan (Brian Regan) asks Mick Johnson (Louis Emerick) to go into partnership with him in his taxi business. Mick moves in to the Close with son Leo and daughter Gemma (Naomi Kamanga) in 1990, lodging with Harry Cross (Bill Dean) and later renting their house from Harry when he moves to St Helens. For many years the stories revolved around Mick, his brother Ellis (Francis Johnson) and cousin Jerome (Leon Lopez), while Leo and Gemma only played incidental roles.

=== Joining the police ===
In 2000 at the age of 18, Leo decided he wanted to join the police force, as Rod Corkhill (Jason Hope) had done at that age in 1987. His father Mick was proud of his sons career choice and Leo was accepted and got a place in police college in London.

=== Adele Murray ===
Before leaving for police college, Leo attended a party held at the Murray's. Fifteen-year-old Adele (Katy Lamont) had fancied Leo for some time. After he witnessed his girlfriend flirting with his neighbour Jimmy Corkhill (Dean Sullivan),Leo began drinking heavily and was later seduced by Adele, after which the two had unprotected sex. Leo immediately regretted the encounter and feared that, if it became known, it could damage his career in the police force.

Leo briefly dated Adele afterward, but soon ended the relationship. When Mick discovered a letter from Adele addressed to Leo, he confronted his son and learned about the affair. Furious, Mick insisted that Leo should take responsibility for his actions. However, realizing that the situation might ruin Leo’s future in the police, he ultimately decided that the best solution was for Leo to leave for London as soon as possible. Leo departed shortly afterward.

=== Adele's pregnancy and termination ===
Adele decided that she did not wish to continue with the pregnancy and decided to have an abortion. Her Catholic stepmother Diane (Bernie Nolan) was opposed to this but her father, Marty (Neil Caple), supported the idea. Mick and Marty ended up fighting in the Close over the issue. When Mick told Leo, however, Leo was supportive and said he would bring-up the child and support Adele. Despite Leo's promise Adele was determined to go ahead with the abortion and had a termination, later leaving the Close to attend the University of Leeds. Shortly afterwards Mick also left the close for London.

== Reception ==
In November 1999, an All About Soap critic praised Cole's performance stating "we've watched Leo Johnson grow up on screen. And now that Steven Cole is playing the role, Brookside viewers are paying the troublesome teen more attention than ever."
