= Episode 1100 =

1100th episode of Brookside

- Brookside episode
- Episode no.: Season 1 Episode 1100
- Directed by: Patrick Tucker
- Written by: Valerie Windsor
- Original air date: 29 May 1992
- Running time: 25 minutes

Episode chronology
← Previous; Episode 1099	Next → Episode 1101

Episode 1100 of the British television soap opera Brookside was first broadcast on Channel 4 on 29 May 1992. The episode was written by Valerie Windsor and directed by Patrick Tucker. The plot focuses entirely on a confrontation between two characters, Barry Grant (Paul Usher) and Terry Sullivan (Brian Regan). It was the show's first two-hander episode and was designed to begin the show's tenth anniversary celebrations. The scenes were filmed on a beach at Formby over a five-day location shoot in poor weather conditions. The location was chosen because of its significance to one of Barry and Terry's early storylines in which they disposed of a car at the beach.

The first part of the episode features a series of flashback sequences as the two characters reminisce over their life-long friendship. The show's producer, Mal Young revealed that the flashback scenes were carefully selected to showcase their "odd friendship". The second part of the episode features a confrontation with Barry holding Terry at the beach with a shotgun. He then confesses to having sex with Terry's dead wife, Sue Sullivan (Annie Miles). He then confesses that he caused Sue and her son, Danny Sullivan's (Keiran Poole) deaths after they fell from a scaffolding. The revelation included a previously unaired scene presented as a flashback, showing Barry at the scene of the crime. Barry gives Terry the shotgun and the opportunity to kill him to avenge Sue and Danny's deaths. The camera pans away to form a cliffhanger ending as a gun shot is fired. Producers kept the outcome of the episode a secret from viewers to add surprise for viewers and in the following episode Barry goes missing and Terry is shown wearing blood-stained clothing.

The episode was promoted with a series of promotional pictures released to British news outlets. Episode 1100 received positive reviews from television critics who favoured the confrontational showdown scenes. Windsor's writing of the episode received praise, as were Usher and Reagan's performances. The episode was included in various "pick of the day" and "television highlight" features in newspapers. The first part of the episode drew criticism for relying on flashback scenes to convey the duo's friendship. In another review, the episode was branded "a let down" because of the plot's predictable outcome.

== Plot ==
Barry Grant (Paul Usher) has a nightmare about Sue Sullivan (Annie Miles) and awakes in his jeep which is parked on a beach. Terry Sullivan (Brian Regan) visits Barry, but he tells Barry he is not staying because he has a shotgun. Terry reveals he is tired of Barry's dramas and wants nothing more to do with him. Terry also plans to move out of their flat but Barry offers to move out instead. Barry reminds Terry that the beach was the same one they once tried to dispose of a car for an insurance scam. Barry claims that their lives were simpler back then. Terry sits with Barry as they reminisce about their childhood friendship. Terry reveals his fondness for Barry's mother, Sheila Grant (Sue Johnston), praising how she supported him over the years. Barry is critical about Sheila concealing Matty Nolan (Tony Scoggo) being his biological father but Terry defends her. Terry explains Sheila only revealed the truth to help him accept Danny as his own child after Sue cheated on him.

Barry claims that he loathed Terry being happy because he feared being left out. Barry admits his jealously of Terry's stable life. Terry blames Barry for all the troubles in his life, noting that Barry caused Tommy McArdle (Malcolm Tierney) to beat him which left him hospitalised. Terry reaffirms his stance on Barry and tries to leave. Barry aims his shotgun at Terry and orders him to stay so he can tell him the truth. Terry tells him he knows he will not use the gun because he is not a killer. Barry makes Terry sit down. Terry tells Barry he always fared better without him, Barry rejects this notion and brings up the loan he gave to Terry. Terry accuses Barry of wanting his eternal gratitude but Barry says the loan was given out of guilt.

Terry tries to leave again so Barry shoots the shotgun and Terry falls to the ground. Barry then reveals that he had sex with Sue. Terry lunges at Barry and punches him and accuses Barry of ruining everything he has. He then punches Barry again and tries to fight him. Barry aims the gun at Barry and tells Terry that Sue was going to tell Terry the truth. He then reveals he was present when Sue and Danny died. He reveals he hated Sue for mistreating Terry and that upon the scaffolding Sue was close to the edge. She got her foot caught and she fell off the scaffolding with Danny. He claims that he tried to put his hand out to save them and claims it was accidental. Terry cannot believe that Barry let Graeme Curtis (David Banks) take the blame and commit suicide. Barry hands Terry the shotgun and gives him the opportunity to shoot him and gain justice. The camera pans away behind the jeep and a gun shot rings out.

== Production ==
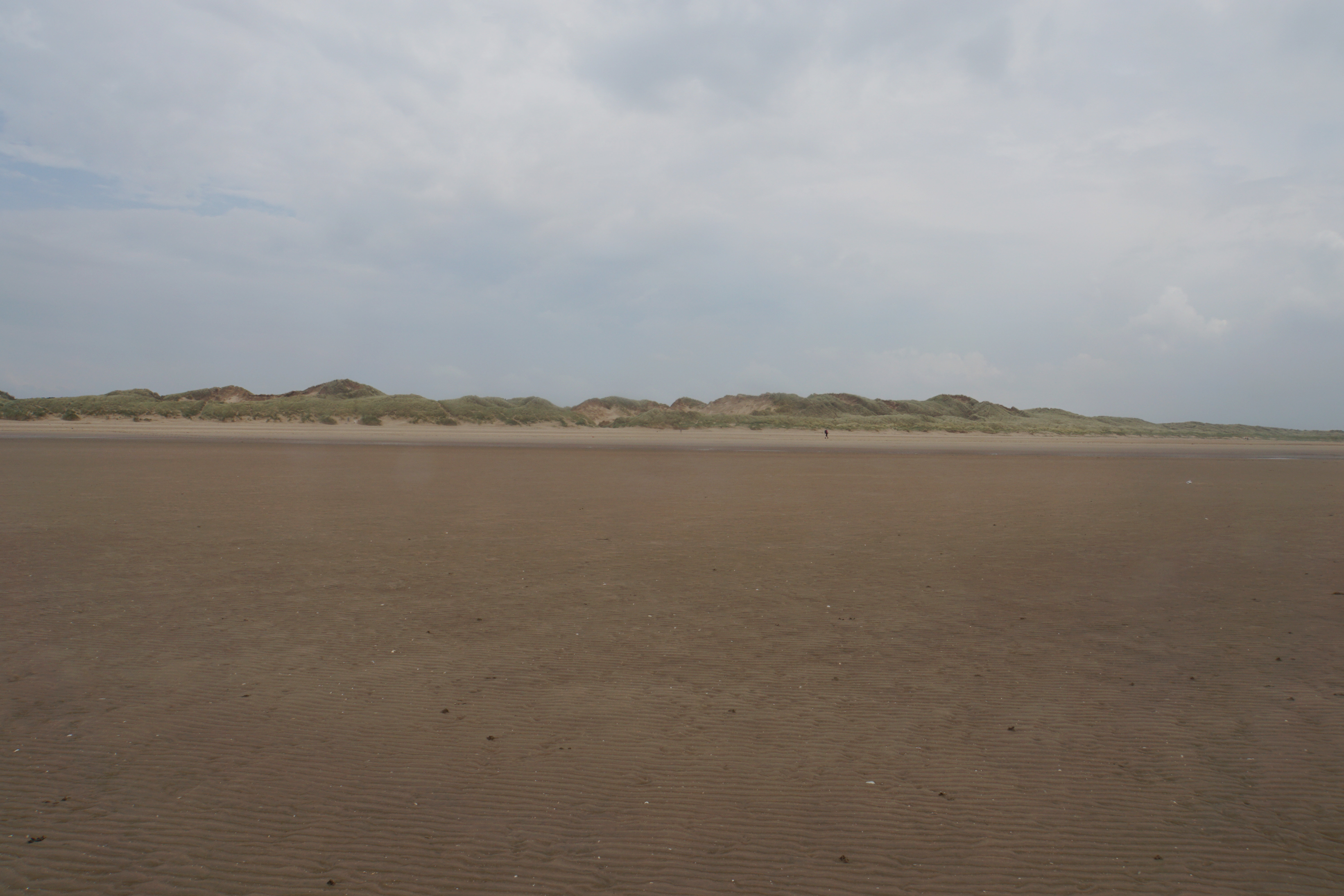
Episode 1100 was filmed at a beach in Formby.

The episode was devised as a two-hander special featuring only the characters of Barry Grant (Paul Usher) and Terry Sullivan (Brian Regan) as they reminisce over their past ten years and eventually get into a confrontation with a shotgun. The entire episode is set on a lonely beach with just Barry and Terry present as they descend into a "tense" showdown. Barry and Terry were the sole two remaining original regular characters in the show at the time. Writers used the episode to reveal the truth about Barry causing the deaths of Terry's wife and step-son, Sue Sullivan (Annie Miles) and Danny Sullivan (Keiran Poole). Barry then gives Terry a shotgun and the opportunity to shoot him in revenge and gain justice. The episode was written by Valerie Windsor and she structured the episode in two parts. The first half featured flashbacks as Barry and Terry share their memories. The second half featured their confrontational scenes. Episode 1100 was directed by Patrick Tucker, Mal Young served as its producer and Phil Redmond as the executive producer. The episode ends with a cliff-hanger, as the camera pans away behind Barry's jeep and a gun-shot rings out. Producers did not want the outcome of the episode to be revealed prior to transmission and did not answer questions about whether or not Terry shoots Barry. In the following episodes, Barry goes missing and this leaves viewers wondering whether or not Terry has killed Barry. He appears in a blood-stained state and refuses to tell anyone what has happened.

The episode's storyline was publicised on 19 May 1992. The episode was also conceived to begin a part of Brookside's tenth anniversary year celebrations. A show publicist told Judith Moss from Liverpool Echo that "we've decided to kick off the celebrations explosively." The show's producer Mal Young told Tim Davey from Evening Post that it is a "gripping" and "extraordinary episode" of Brookside. He explained that they collected archive footage from previous episodes to relive Barry and Terry's friendship. Young added "we have collected all the crucial events in this odd relationship." They told a Formby Times reporter that with the full flashbacks, "it will all be very dramatic". When Barry confesses to murdering Terry's family, he points the shotgun at Terry's head. The episode marked the first time viewers got to watch Barry killing Sue and Danny. This was presented in another flashback sequence on-screen whilst Barry confesses all to Terry. The unaired scene was presented from Sue and Danny's point of view. Young explained that "Barry tells the lot" to Terry and then gives him the chance of justice.

Young elaborated that the episode had been a culmination of storylines to make Barry a more vulnerable character. He wanted to remind viewers that Barry is still Sheila Grant's (Sue Johnston) son, he was raised as a Catholic, feels guilt and is not a natural born killer. Stories in episodes prior to Barry's confession included him being chased by gangs, threatened by his ex-girlfriend Fran Pearson (Julie Peasgood), discovering Matty Nolan (Tony Scoggo) is his biological father and losing his friendship with Terry. Usher was partly responsible for this shift in Barry's characterisation and enduring the traumas before and during Episode 1100. He told a reporter from Sunday People "I begged the scriptwriters to give Barry a hard time to make the character more interesting, and they've certainly done that." In the book, "Brookside - The First Ten Years", Usher discussed Barry's decision to confess to Terry with author Geoff Tibballs. He stated that Barry "certainly suffered over the death of Sue and Danny - that's why he finally had to tell Terry exactly what happened." Reagan believed that at this point in the storyline, Terry had become a more dangerous character because had lost everything. He added "it wouldn't bother Terry if someone walked up to him in the street and stabbed him."

Filming for the episode took place during a five-day location shoot on a beach in Formby. The weather was windy and it rained and Usher had to film his scenes with just a T-shirt on. Production chose the beach because it already had significance to Barry and Terry's history. A previous story saw them on the beach as they sank a Jaguar car into the water.

== Promotion and broadcast ==
Promotional photographs from the episode were issued to news outlets and printed in their publications in advance. These included a still of Barry putting the shotgun to Terry's head, Barry handing Terry the gun and a blood-stained Terry. Episode 1100 was originally broadcast on Channel 4 on Friday, 29 May 1992 in their 8 PM timeslot.

== Reception ==
John Dugdale from The Guardian described the episode as a "show-down for former blood brothers" Barry and Terry. Dugdale noted that a two-hander was not an "uncommon device" in soap operas, noting that rival soap EastEnders had already done it. Dugdale criticised the first half of Episode 1100 for being "dull" and relying on flashbacks to "recapitulate" 1099 episodes worth of storylines. He praised the second half and Windor's writing, noting she "came back strongly after the interval" and her scripts were "convincing once the revelations began to flow." The critic added Barry giving Terry the gun to act out his revenge was "the false note" of the episode, concluding the episode closed with a "classic cliffhanger device". The episode was chosen as "the critics choice" printed in The Daily Telegraph. Their writer branded it "one of those virtuoso two-handed specials that have tempted the producers and performers of every kind of television." They commended Usher and Reagan's performance during the episode, noting they "swop Liverpool tough talk, anguished admissions and veiled threats with the authenticity of long practise." Praise was also given to Windsor's "well written" scenes in the episode. Mark Barden writing for The News remarked that "gripping stuff is in store as two of the Scouse soap's longest-serving characters come together tonight in what threatens to be their final and most dramatic confrontation." He added that the entire episode is "devoted to their emotionally charged showdown". Barden also recommended that "everyone" should watch the episode.

The episode was featured in Kent Evening Post's and Evening Telegraph's television "highlights" feature. A writer from Birmingham Metronews included the episode in their "pick of the day" feature. They branded it "the final showdown" and "tense", noting both characters had been on downward spirals leading up to the episode. Irena Morgan and Lauren O'Beirne from South Wales Echo described Terry and Barry's showdown as "one of the most gripping scenes of the year" that "is likely to send viewers ratings soaring." They added that it was a "bizarre twist of fate" that Barry had managed to get away with murder. A writer from News and Star predicted that Brookside would experience a growth in television ratings and Usher would gain more unwelcome public attention from the episode. Val Watts from Halifax Evening Courier described it as a "tense two-man showdown involving a loaded gun" as "killer Barry Grant finally told embittered Terry Sullivan the truth." A Daily Mirror columnist described it as a "dramatic confrontation" and "gripping showdown" between the characters. He added the scenes in Episode 1100 "should quell any doubts that Barry Grant is the undisputed beast of Brookside" and "a rat that let another man stand trial." Tony Pratt from the newspaper stated "Barry has kept the lid on his terrible secret for so long we were beginning to doubt whether Terry would ever learn the truth." A Sunday People journalist believed that "Brookside bosses are ready for outrage" over its "blood soaked" Episode 1100.

Susan Wallace from The Echo opined that Barry and Terry "have Brookside to themselves tonight in an episode that will uncover some brutal truths." She added that the setting is a "picturesque beach conducive to confession." Writing for Liverpool Echo, Wallace described Usher and Reagan as holding "the entire episode alone in dramatic scenes when some brutal truths are uncovered." Her colleague, Judith Moss believed that Brookside were delivering "another shocker" with the episode's content, continuing their history of shock storytelling. Moss added that it is a "rip-roaring plot". The following day after Episode 1100 was broadcast, Jane Gott from Telegraph & Argus applauded the show for being "the best soap on TV". Gott explained that Brookside was able to compete with bigger show's, such as "outdated" Coronation Street. She assessed it was a "traumatic confrontation" and the story was part of "the nasty Barry Grant saga". Her colleague, Peter Anderson described it as a "tense two-man showdown" and a "gripping two-hander" complete with "nostalgic flashbacks". A Hull Daily Mail critic also branded it a "tense two-man showdown" and a "nail-biting showdown".

In a negative review, Daily Mirror's Hilary Kingsley jested it was the "Gunfight at the Mersey Corral" which was "such a let down". Kingsley alluded to the predictable nature of the plot's outcome, with Barry telling Terry the truth. She added that the cliffhanger ending of who is shot meant that Brookside could replicate prolonging the outcome of the story in the same manner they did with Sue and Danny's murders. Though Kingsley did conclude that she would "look forward to it". The write up also included an illustration in which Barry and Terry were presented as fighting satirical caricatures. Jenny Palmer writing for Sunday Mercury called the episode "Brookside-by-the-sea" and questioned the episode's ambiguous ending. She wondered whether Terry was "mad enough" to kill Barry or even he "understands two syllable words like 'justice'". She concluded "no doubt Brookside will keep us in suspense for a few more weeks."
