= The Scousers =

Series of sketches from the Harry Enfield's Television Programme

"The Scousers" was a regular series of tongue-in-cheek sketches from the Harry Enfield's Television Programme (BBC2), followed by the Harry Enfield & Chums comedy show (BBC1) of the early 1990s. Each sketch began with "The Scousers" written in large yellow letters and a short parody version of the Brookside theme song being played.

== Gary, Barry and Terry ==
It featured a set of stereotyped Liverpudlian characters or Scousers, "Ga'", "Ba'" and "Te'" (Gary, Barry and Terry) played by Gary Bleasdale, Harry Enfield, Joe McGann, and Mark Moraghan. The original inspiration for the Scousers sketches were Barry Grant and Terry Sullivan, two characters from the Channel 4, soap opera Brookside, set in Liverpool. Bleasdale, McGann and Moraghan are actually from Liverpool. Bleasdale also appeared in Brookside in 1995 as a character called Donnelly.

The Scousers were usually depicted with Kevin Keegan bubble perm hairstyles and bushy moustaches, wearing shell suits, and speaking in exaggerated Scouse accents. Common catch phrases they came up included "Eh? Eh? Eh?" "Dey do dough don't dey dough" ("They do though, don't they though").

== "Calm down!" ==
Most sketches saw two of the trio develop an argument, with the third member stepping in to break up the argument (and frequently finding himself pulled into another disagreement). Whenever a potential problem or dispute arose, this would result in The Scousers repeating to each other their most famous catch phrase:

" Eh! Eh! Alright! Alright! Calm down! Calm down!"

This catch phrase was Bleasdale's input as he changed the scripted original, which was "Break it up 'ey, come on, break it up", during the first rehearsal. McGann brought "Dey do dough, don't dey dough" to the sketches. The characters had allegiances to the city's football teams with "Ga'" being an Everton fan while "Ba'" & "Te'" were Liverpool fans. This leads to even more disagreement. During the holiday in Spain, Ga wears a Liverpool football shirt showing their fluid support.

The actors Paul Usher and Brian Regan who played Brookside characters "Barry" and "Terry" also appeared in a "The Scousers" sketch "Terry Gets Married". One of The Scousers re-emerged several years later in Enfield's sketch show Harry and Paul.
