= Terry Sullivan (Brookside) =

Fictional character from the Channel 4 soap opera Brookside

- Brookside character
- Portrayed by: Brian Regan
- Duration: 1982–1997
- First appearance: 17 November 1982
- Last appearance: 12 February 1997
- Created by: Phil Redmond
- Spin-off appearances: Brookside: The Lost Weekend (1997)
In-universe information
- Occupation: Construction worker Removal man Taxi driver
- Father: Jack Sullivan
- Mother: Mary McNab
- Half-brothers: Steve McNab
- Half-sisters: Julie McNab; Ann McNab
- Wife: Sue Harper (1989–1991)
- Adoptive sons: Danny Sullivan
- Uncles: Albert
- Aunts: Mary
- First cousins: Steven

Terry Sullivan is a fictional character from the British Channel 4 soap opera Brookside, played by Brian Regan. One of the show's original characters, Terry debuted on-screen during the episode broadcast on 17 November 1982. Regan appeared in the show between 1982 and 1997. At the time of his departure, Regan was Brookside's longest serving cast member. Terry became one of Brookside's most iconic characters and was recognisable via his trademark curly permed hair and moustache. Terry also became known as one of soap opera's most unlucky characters because of his numerous storylines involving trauma, loss and heart-break. Writers created an on-screen partnership between Terry and Barry Grant (Paul Usher). Their friendship is endured for their entire tenure. Their characterisation was the inspiration for the comedy sketches titled The Scousers, which appeared in the television show, Harry Enfield's Television Programme.

Terry is portrayed as unlucky in love as writers paired him in doomed relationships with Michelle Jones (Tracey Jay) and Vicki Cleary (Cheryl Leigh). His later relationship with Sue Harper (Annie Miles) became a prominent storyline. The pair marry after she becomes pregnant with a son, Danny (Keiran Poole). Sue deceives Terry into believing he is the child's father and later discovers the truth. Writers continued to destroy the Sullivan marriage by creating a sexual affair between Sue and Barry. Sue and Danny were killed off in a mystery "Whodunit" story to celebrate the show's 1000th episode. Producers kept the identity of Sue's killer a secret and included Terry in the official suspects. Barry was later revealed as the killer, which tested their lifelong friendship once Terry discovered the truth. Producers planned violent content for Terry and Barry's showdown after he discovers his friend's betrayal. The episode featuring Terry's violence was one of the show's most difficult to produce due to production blunders. It was also controversial and condemnation from the Independent Television Commission forced a reshoot and a mellowed reaction from Terry.

== Development ==
=== Introduction and characterisation ===
Terry as he appeared in a 1984

Brian Regan, a former footballer turned actor took on the role of Terry in 1982. Terry is one of the show's original characters and he debuted on-screen during the sixth episode broadcast on 17 November 1982. Terry was originally a recurring character but Regan was promoted to the show's regular cast the following year. Regan has stated that joining the cast of Brookside in his mid-twenties gave him the "cotton-wool feeling of security" like when he was at school.

When Terry was introduced, he was not living on Brookside Close and resided on the local housing estate. In early episodes, writers established a close friendship with Barry Grant (Paul Usher). In his book, Brookside: The Official Companion, show creator Phil Redmond wrote that Terry is characterised as a "scallywag" type. Writers often portrayed Terry as an unlucky-in-love character with numerous failed relationships. The author of Life in the Close, Geoff Tibballs assessed that Terry was "forever unlucky in love" and has "many business exploits". Regan believed that he and Terry had different personalities but shared some similarities. Regan told Caro Thompson from TVTimes that "in other ways I'm not like Terry at all. I think I'm much more aggressive than he is. He's so easy-going he's a pushover. Although underneath, he's quite strong and if he's pushed too far he'll snap."

Annie Miles, who plays Terry's later wife, Sue Sullivan described him as a "nice fella" with a "big heart". He treats women differently to early stereotypes of men who expect their dinner on the table in the evening by carrying out house chores. She also characterised Terry as a "scally" but more so "a loveable scally." Terry's "nice and kind" characterisation made him popular with female viewers. Regan recalled that a female viewers told him that she and her friendship group wished they could find a man like Terry. Regan enjoyed playing Terry more after realising the appeal of his genuine persona. Regan has stated that he disliked portraying Terry's "lovey-dovey" scenes because he was bashful and often got embarrassed with large crews around filming Terry's romantic scenes. Regan told Nick Fisher from TV Guide that Terry had transformed into a mature character via fatherhood. He thought that during Terry's early storylines, he had allowed himself to suffer and let women destroy his life. Regan wanted Terry to become more "gangster" and a "bastard" even though he retained his "soft spot" traits. Producers also explored Terry's character further with the introduction of his father, Jack Sullivan played by William Maxwell. He becomes known to take part in fraudulent activities and near criminal activity.

Terry's image is something that Regan himself developed. The character became known for his trademark moustache and curly hair, which Regan grew especially for Terry's on-screen image. He originally grew a moustache because he was told his faced looked "soft" and "girly". He believed it made the character appear more "macho". Regan added that if he stopped playing Terry, he would shave off his moustache. In 1986, Regan injured his ankle while watching a football match. His injury forced production to rewrite Terry's storylines and use other characters in scenes.

=== Early relationships ===
Writers created Terry's first relationship with Michelle Jones (Tracey Jay). Her sister, Marie Jackson (Anna Keaveney) takes a dislike to Terry. She dislikes Terry's friendship with Barry and believes he is only interested in Michelle's new found wealth following the death of their sister, Petra Taylor (Alexandra Pigg). Michelle is a trainee beautician and wants to better herself, she takes it upon herself to make Terry look more presentable.

Michelle's brother-in-law, George Jackson (Cliff Howells) is framed for a robbery he did not commit. Local gangster Tommy McArdle (Malcolm Tierney) and his associate Victor Scott (Robbie Dee) force Terry and Barry to provide them with an alibi. This creates issues for the couple but Terry cannot defy McArdle because he fears violent retaliation. Terry and Barry later try to help George by striking a deal with police to implicate McArdle, but George is imprisoned regardless. McArdle retaliates by having Terry and Barry attacked. Terry is beaten more severely and spends time in hospital on an intensive care unit.

When Marie moves away with her family, Terry and Michelle live together at the house. Michelle becomes bored and begins to attend dance classes. Michelle develops an attraction to her dance instructor, Richard de Saville (Robert Dallas). Terry was uneasy about their association because he knew Richard as a working as brick layer under the name, Albert Duff. Terry becomes secretive around Michelle and she discovers he is working at a nightclub belonging to McArdle. Michelle is upset with Terry's betrayal and writers created a feeling of mistrust between the duo. Michelle begins an affair with Richard and Terry later discovers them having sex in his home. Michelle asks Terry for forgiveness but he refuses and throws their mattress out of the window and violently attacks it with a carving knife. The incident makes Michelle realise their relationship had ended and she goes to live with Marie and Terry moves out too.

Terry then moves into the house share set-up at Harry Cross' (Bill Dean) property, alongside Pat Hancock (David Easter) and Sandra Maghie (Sheila Grier) following Kate Moses' (Sharon Rosita) death in a gun siege. Writers also portrayed Terry settling into a new relationship with Vicki Cleary (Cheryl Leigh). Terry becomes close friends with Pat and they begin a van hire business together. Terry and Pat secure the Hentytainments contract from Mike Henty (Paul Humpoletz) but their business soon begins being targeted by a rival hire company. They create fake jobs and vandalise Terry's van to seek revenge. Vicki introduces herself to Terry and reveals that her family business are behind the disruption and blame him for losing the work contract. Terry begins dating Vicki but Pat refuses to forget the Cleary's actions and enlists the help of Barry. They attack Vicki's brothers, Joe (Con O'Neill) and Eddie Cleary (Phillip Walsh). In another incident, Pat and Barry vandalise a van they mistakenly believe belongs to the Cleary's. Terry and Pat's business becomes successful but their rivalry with Vicki's brothers make it difficult. Terry's presence in the house share begins to annoy Sandra who thinks Pat behaves differently around Terry.

Terry later becomes involved with McArdle once again after he is pressured to carry out further criminal activity. McArdle orders Terry to take his mother on a trip to Barbados. She acts as a courier for McArdle and hides a package in her suitcase and gets Terry to go through customs with it. With Sandra moved out of the house share, they invite Mike and Mick to move in with them for extra rent money. Mike's charming behaviour irritates Pat and Mick's pet macaw creates a noise problem. Vicki soon becomes annoyed with the lodgers and they are evicted. They remained together for more than one year until writers separated them. She becomes annoyed with Pat and gives Barry an ultimatum that either he evicts Pat and ends their business partnership, or she will not move in with him. Terry is hesitant to betray his friend and a tiring Vicki breaks-up with Terry. Another failed relationship followed with croupier Alison Fernie (Ellie Darvill). When Harry grows tired of Pat and Terry in his home, he pays off Pat to leave. He then tries to sell the house to Alison but she decides to leave Terry and return to her ex-husband. Harry's actions leave Terry alone without a home.

=== Marriage and betrayal ===
Terry moves in with his neighbour, Jonathan Gordon-Davies (Steven Pinner) and meets his secretary Sue Harper. They soon begin a relationship and he becomes a taxi driver going into business with Mick Johnson (Louis Emerick). Terry's non-stereotypical male persona made him a suitable partner for Sue. Miles told Fiona Gibson from TV Guide that "Terry's gorgeous, irresistible, Terry will do the dishes and the ironing. I mean with some fellas the tea's got to be on the table hasn't it? He's a nice fella. He's got a big heart."

When Terry and Sue decide to have a break from each other, Sue gets drunk and has sex with her lawyer friend, Martin Howes (Andrew Hall). She resumes her romance with Terry but discovers she is pregnant. Sue continuing with her pregnancy and marriage plans after her infidelity created a gender divide with viewers. Miles revealed that male viewers thought Sue was a "tart" and female viewers thought Sue was "brave". Miles defended her character's lies, noting than men were often unfaithful to their partners. She added that thousands of people could relate to Sue's predicament after they have got drunk and had sex with someone else. Miles wished that Sue had been honest with Terry after but noted the story would have no longer been compulsive viewing. Regan was happy with the story because it was more interesting than acting out filler scenes. He told Gibson that it "keeps me on my toes, like". When Regan was out in public he had viewers shouting at him that Terry is not the biological father of Sue's baby. Regan and Miles knew each other prior to working together on Brookside. They supported each other through their characters' "traumatic" storyline.

Terry and Sue's wedding does not occur on-screen but their wedding reception, complete with marquee is shown after. Miles believed that not filming a wedding ceremony was a "missed opportunity" and Regan thought it made resulted in a "cheap production" of their storyline. Though, Regan added he was happy that Terry and Sue didn't have an overly-glamorised wedding like the union between the Neighbours characters Scott Robinson (Jason Donovan) and Charlene Robinson (Kylie Minogue) had.

Regan hoped that Terry discovering the truth about Sue's infidelity would change Terry into a more sinister character. He explained that "sometimes I'd really like Terry to be a bastard, I was thinking maybe he could turn gangster if he finds out the baby's not his. He could become totally ruthless because he's been crapped on a lot of times." He described Sue's betrayal as the "ultimate" form which could result in Terry going "berserk - he could even kill someone." In another interview, Regan assessed that Terry's characterisation meant that discovering Sue's deception would make him question their entire relationship. Terry would wonder if Sue has married him to give her child a father. Sue gives birth to a baby boy, Daniel (Keiran Poole). Regan told Fisher that working on-set with a baby made him broody and wanted to begin his own family. Regan assessed that Terry's characterisation meant that discovering Sue's deception would make him wonder if Sue has married him to give Daniel a father. Regan believed Terry's fatherhood story completely changed his characterisation. He described Terry as being a "big boy now" who has "matured a hell of a lot." He believed it altered Terry to the extent it was "almost like playing another character".

From September 1989, writers portrayed Terry fulfilled and enjoying his role as a father as he looks forward to returning home from work each day to his new family. Regan described Terry as a devoted father who is really involved with Daniel's upbringing. Sue feels guilty over her deception and wants Terry to have his own biological child. She asks Terry if they can try to have another child and he agrees. Producers reintroduced Martin into the story to create more drama. Miles believed that Martin's return created an issue because Sue has "strong chemistry" with Martin. She told Caro Thompson (TVTimes) that Martin being the father of her child means "she can't help being attracted to him." Though Sue's love of Terry is genuine and Miles believed Sue probably would have married him had she not been pregnant. Miles concluded that "I know it's hard, but the longer she leaves it, the harder it gets. I just couldn't be as deceptive as she's been, I'd have to tell."

By episodes in June 1990, Terry seeks help from doctors because Sue does not get pregnant again. He believes something may have changed but is not worried because they already have Daniel. Terry is called back to the hospital for further tests which begins to worry him. Barry reassures Terry that there will be nothing wrong with him because of Daniel's existence. However, the tests later reveal that Terry is unable to have children of his own. Regan told Thompson that the storyline was "wonderful" but "tough at times". He revealed that he had been staying up late until 3 AM reading his scripts and deliberating how to portray Terry's heartache. Regan assessed that "it's difficult to put yourself in Terry's shoes. He's being lied to and deceived by his wife. It's a terrible thing to happen to anyone." He noted that Terry endured much "heartache" during his early years but discovering that Daniel is not his son is "the worst thing that's ever happened to him." Regan correctly predicted that Sue's deceit would have an ever lasting effect on Terry. He described his character as being "devastated, in complete shock" and believed he would "go crazy" and "off the rails" resulting in Terry being a "changed man forever". Writers continued the theme of betrayal and infidelity in the Sullivan marriage. This time Sue begins an affair with Terry's best friend Barry. Brookside fans reacted well to Barry and Sue's romance and viewership ratings began to rise.

=== Who killed Sue & Danny? ===
Miles decided to leave Brookside and producer Mal Young decided to kill off Sue in a mystery whodunit murder storyline. Brookside was approaching its 1000th episode and the production team wanted to create a memorable story to commemorate it. Young decided to kill off Danny but killing a child on-screen was controversial and had not been done before on a British soap opera. When the story was originally pitched to writers, they believed it was too risky and they did not want to develop the story. Liking their reaction, Young decided the story could maximise interest in Brookside during their early 1990s expansion of the show. Young wanted a "whodunit" narrative to keep the audience guessing and generate more interest. Young and Redmond decided that Barry would be the murder culprit but decided to keep it a guarded secret not even informing Usher of their plans. No one else in the cast or film crew were told. Young believed this secret retained the story's authenticity as a mystery plot. The characters of Barry, Terry and Graeme Curtis were all dressed in white t-shirts, jeans and trainers. This narrowed the murderer down but kept the audience guessing.

Sue and Danny's death occurs after they are pushed from a scaffolding. When the scenes were filmed, a shot of Sue being grabbed showed that Barry could be the killer. A view of the killer's legs was included to allude that Terry was the killer. Then a scene showing a telephone revealed that it could have been Graeme. In addition an extra matching their physicality was filmed climbing stairs in-case it was a completely different character. This confused the crew, who demanded to know who Sue's killer was. Young did not reveal the culprit because he believed that the actor would portray their character more sinisterly. Young and Redmond knew the whodunit story would create increased complaints and fan mail. It was so successful that viewers had become invested in solving the mystery themselves. When the episode was broadcast, viewers recorded the episode and replayed it to try and identify the killer. Young received eighty letters who spotted that the jeans were Terry's and believed it could not have been Barry. Some viewers also printed off freeze-frames of what they believed the killer was wearing. Despite their findings, Young remained adamant that Barry would be revealed as Sue and Danny's killer.

When Barry was revealed as the culprit to viewers, some found it difficult to contend with. Young feared the viewers would now hate one of their most prominent characters. Viewers wrote in branding Barry a "bastard" but there was often support expressed for him to remain in the show. Justice for Sue and giving Terry closure was not in Young's mindset as he scrambled to keep Barry in the series. He told Tibballs that "I was concerned about how you retain sympathy for a murderer. People said he must be caught and put away, justice must be seen to be done. But it's a fact of life that murderers are walking around free. We always aim to be realistic so I thought, 'let's go for it'." Usher was also nervous about the reaction he would get from the general public. He had reservations about Barry murdering a child and asked Young if he was sure he wanted to proceed. Young added that the viewer reaction proved he made the correct decision.

The story had longevity and remained prominent in the show. The affair had also been kept a secret from Terry. Writers decided to reveal this separately from Barry's murderous secret. The culmination of the adultery secret occurred in a scene featuring Fran Pearson (Julie Peasgood), who is Barry's disgruntled ex-lover informing Terry that Sue and Barry had an affair. The revelation was long-awaited for Terry's fans and viewers alike. To celebrate the anticipation, producers wanted dramatic scenes for the reveal episodes. The centric episode numbered 1049 became one of the show's most problematic. Young had envisioned violent reaction from Terry due to the magnitude of the betrayal. Terry's retaliation originally included throwing a chip pan of hot fat over Barry and threatening him with a knife. A series of blunders and objections from Channel 4 forced the episode's content to be altered. Writers drafted the fight scenes but when it came to filming the episodes, miscommunication ruined Young's plans. Regan and Usher filmed the fight scene during one shoot for a Friday night episode. Their fight was supposed to continue and explore Barry's injuries from the hot fat. The following Monday night episode was filmed with a different director and crew. The two crews had not conversed and the second crew shot their episode with Barry having a knife cut instead of burns from hot fat. Young was upset with the edits and wanted to reshoot. Usher was unavailable for filming due to a holiday and could not be contacted.

Regan was required to film new scenes by himself, including throwing a pan of hot fat onto the kitchen floor and pretending to approach Barry with a knife. The Independent Television Commission (ITC) discovered that Brookside were planning to broadcast the violent knife scenes. ITC reviewers requested to view the episode and they decided that it would be acceptable to broadcast the knife scenes during the Friday night timeslot but not during the Sunday omnibus edition. However, when the ITC witnessed the following episode in which Terry holds a knife to Barry's throat, they refused to allow it to be broadcast at all. This happened three days prior to its planned broadcast. Producers waited outside Usher's home until he returned from his holiday. They asked him to come straight to the studio and film new content. Two days prior they filmed new confrontation scenes and Barry's injuries now came from Terry trapping his hand in a door. They cut the scene, took it to be edited and managed to get it to Channel 4 the following morning.

In May 1992, writers created a special two-hander episode featuring only Terry and Barry. It was also the milestone 1100th episode and it featured Barry and Terry the confrontational "showdown" over Barry's secrets. On Barry's decision to confess to Terry, Usher stated "he certainly suffered over the death of Sue and Danny - that's why he finally had to tell Terry exactly what happened." Terry ends his long-standing friendship with Barry, after which producers wrote Barry out of the show temporarily and rested the story. Barry flees to Madrid and hides out while Terry tries to accept the circumstances of his wife's death. After four months, Barry decides he wants to return home but is worried that Terry will inform the police about Sue and Danny's deaths. Usher told TV Quick's Jane Cameron that "relations between them are quite strained, to say the least." Barry decides that a personal meeting with Terry is the best option and invites him to visit him in Spain.

=== Anna Wolska ===
Terry's next potential love interest is Polish immigrant Anna Wolska (Kazia Pelka). Terry and Anna become friends while she is residing in the United Kingdom to study English. Once her studies and visa expire, Anna is supposed to return to Poland. She decides to remain in the country illegally and cannot work. Anna decides that she must marry a British national in order to stay in the UK. Terry agrees to a marriage of convenience but soon develops genuine feelings for Anna. Pelka told a TVTimes reporter that Anna cannot proceed with the marriage because she "didn't want to use Terry, so she broke of their engagement when she realised he was in love with her." Anna then decides to marry Barry instead but Terry tries to warn Anna about Barry's violent past. This makes Anna wonder whether she made a mistake cancelling her plans with Terry. Pelka explained added "Barry is clever and devious, and he's certainly not Anna's type. She's attracted to sensitive men and she appreciates Terry's concern for her."

=== Departures and returns ===
By 1996, Regan had become Brookside's longest-serving cast member. Terry was written out of Brookside in a story featuring him moving to Spain to recover from brain damage. Regan was rehired by Brookside in late 1996. After Terry was written out of Brookside, Regan experienced financial difficulties and lost his home. Redmond agreed to let Regan and his family move into a flat on Brookside Close, in a house that was not featured on-screen. Journalists from British newspapers discovered this and began to take photos of Regan at his new home. Terry's return storyline featured him discovering his father Jack is a murderer. In the story, Terry finds bones during building work that exposes Jack's secret. Terry also becomes concerned about Jack's relationship with Julia Brogan (Gladys Ambrose) after discovering his mother, Mary (Sally Treble) who he had presumed was dead was actually still alive. Due to the press interest in Regan, he was pictured filming a "fierce" argument scene with Jack outside the shops on the Brookside parade set. In response to the interest, a Brookside publicist revealed that "despite his problems, Terry is staying centre stage in two new storylines. He's a favourite with the viewers."

== Reception ==
As Terry became a prominent character within the show his popularity grew and he garnered positive reviews. Julia Houston from BBC News described Terry as a "loveable rogue" from Brookside's "1980s heyday", adding his "antics were regularly watched by up to seven million viewers a week." Sophie McCoid and Emilia Bona from Crosby Herald named Regan as one of "the show's biggest stars". Journalists Michael Mutch and Victoria Scheer (Huddersfield Daily Examiner) described Terry as one of the show's "leading roles" for fifteen years. In March 2012, Jane Merrick of The Independent stated that comedian John Bishop was fast becoming the UK's favourite Scouser. Merrick thought Bishop was not a scouse stereotype and predicted that in future decades people would actually remember Terry Sullivan as the UK's most memorable Scouser.

However, it was Terry's curly perm and moustache that became his trademark and iconic look. Tanith Carey, writing for both Daily Mirror and Daily Record believed that his appearance made 1980s Terry popular but noted that Regan's later weight gain changed viewer perception of the character. She explained that "once, his trademark Kevin Keegan perm and hairy caterpillar moustache made him a surprise heart-throb for millions of female viewers." A reporter from the Lichfield Mercury also branded Regan as the show's "heart throb". A writer from The Irish Times discussed Terry's appearance stating "with his curly hair and shell suit, Brian Regan's Terry Sullivan helped define the stereotype of a generation of Liverpool men." Ben Rossington from Liverpool Echo branded the character a "loveable rogue" and "the curly-haired, moustachioed Terry." Stuart Jeffries of The Guardian quipped that "moustachioed" Terry was "doomed" to spend life under "that perm".

Terry and Barry provided Harry Enfield an inspiration for his famous Liverpudlian sketches titled The Scousers, which appeared on his television show, Harry Enfield's Television Programme. The main characters named Terry, Barry and Garry mimicked Terry's appearance complete with perms, moustaches and shell-suits. Regan and Usher later guest starred in a Scousers sketch during the episode broadcast on 30 April 1992. It featured them meeting their counterparts during comedic pre-wedding sketch. Marianne Jones from The Telegraph said the "scallywag fashion" trend had been "lampooned" in British culture, using Enfield's mocking of Terry and Barry as a prime example.

Terry and Barry's long endured on-screen partnership was profiled in Lorna Hughes' (Liverpool Echo) feature on Brookside's "best couples". Hughes called them "besties" who "had a true but deeply dysfunctional friendship, which somehow survived Barry being responsible for the death of Terry's wife Sue and son Danny." Angie Sammons from Liverpool Confidential stated that Terry and Barry are unforgettable characters. Frances Traynor from Liverpool Echo branded Terry and Barry as "loveable scallies" and that most things they got involved with failed. She included the duo trying to sink their car, their violent beach showdown and Terry's involvement in the cult as some of Brookside's most memorable storylines. In the book, "The Guinness Book of Classic British TV", authors Paul Cornell, Martin Day and Keith Topping wrote that Terry and Barry's relationship had "many ups and downs". They profiled that "Terry was an accomplice to Barry's dodgy money making schemes. He was always expected to comply, regardless of risk, and only occasionally refused." They noted that Terry became unstable via the cult story and rather than "come to his senses", he blamed Barry for the house explosion. They assessed that during this era, Terry was portrayed "by now as mad as toast dipped in scouse." They concluded that the friendship was not all losses on Terry's behalf, noting that Barry "inevitably" chose Terry over his girlfriend Penny Crosbie (Mary Tamm).

Terry's longevity allowed significant character and story development that generated reviews. On Terry's importance to the show, The Irish Times reporter believed producers put Terry at "the centre of some of the soap's most dramatic storylines". This continued until Terry departed and they opined he was a "key player" in the "dramatic storyline" featured in Brookside's 1000th episode. Nick Fisher from TV Guide assessed that over seven years, Terry had transformed from "wide-boy scallywag to married Mr Nice Guy." He believed Terry had "endearing qualities" of "maturity and rugged stability". Fisher added that "whatever" Terry became, it was met with approval of women because "it seems that Sullivan has evolved into the New Scouse Man; the caring, sharing, non-macho marvel of every girl's dreams." TVTimes' Caro Thompson branded Terry a "sweet" and "unsuspecting" character. Of Sue's betrayal of Terry, Thompson added "the nail biting will-she, won't-she tell saga has had millions of Brookside viewers taking sides as the complicated web of Sue's deceit has spun her and Terry into an increasingly impossible situation." Thompson described the reveal of Daniel's father and subsequent fallout a "compelling drama which will have viewers glued to their screens." The Daily Mirror's James Moore and Claire Goldwin chose Terry's "top storyline" as his wife and child being murdered. Closer's Katy Brent chose a "brainwashed" Terry in the cult story as one of the thirty-four reasons Brookside made "totally brilliant telly".

Terry's bad luck was a popular topic for critics. A Sunday Mirror reporter branded Terry a "character whose luck is always bad" owing to his many traumatic storylines. Tanith Carey branded the character "Tragic Terry" and "TV's Mr Tragic". Carey assessed that Terry had to "cope with one disaster after another." Erin Santillo from Daily Post branded Terry the show's "resident bad-boy". Vicki Coppock, writing for the radical feminist magazine, Trouble & Strife was critical about Terry violent reaction towards Sue and accused writers of portraying misogyny. Coppock believed that Brookside were advocating that violence against women is acceptable if they are unfaithful. She noted that Terry's reaction to Sue's affair was "particularly contentious". Coppock assessed that Sue's betrayal "threatened Terry's sexuality especially since it coincided with the discovery of his infertility." She added that the character's "dialogue was tinged with misogynist phrases for several weeks afterwards." Coppock also claimed that Regan received fan mail applauding Terry for his violent reaction towards Sue and that Miles had been "verbally abused by men in the streets as a consequence" of Sue's infidelity.
