= Marty Murray (Brookside) =

Fictional character from Brookside

- Brookside character
- Portrayed by: Neil Caple
- Duration: 2000–2003
- First appearance: 28 March 2000
- Last appearance: 4 November 2003
In-universe information
- Occupation: Caretaker
- Brothers: Christy Murray
- Wife: Jan Murray (backstory; 2003–present); Diane McKenna (until 2002)
- Sons: Steve Murray; Anthony Murray
- Daughters: Adele Murray

Marty Murray is a character from Channel 4 soap Brookside played by Neil Caple from 2000 until 2003.

== Development ==
Actor Neil Caple began playing the role and the Murray family debuted on-screen during the episode airing on 28 March 2000. Of joining the cast, Caple stated "Brookside is far and away the best soap. I don't mind being called a soap actor, that's what I'm here to do." The Murray family were introduced by Brookside's new producer, Paul Marquess during his rejuvenation of the show. Of their introduction, Marquess revealed that "the Murrays are an ordinary working-class Liverpool family, who will play a key role in taking Brookside back to basics." On the official Brookside' website Marty was described as working hard to move his family off a council housing estate. He views the house in Brookside Close as his "first proper home". The Murrays initially appear as "the ideal family unit". When Marty is introduced into the series he takes a job at the school as a caretaker.

== Storylines ==
When Lindsey Corkhill sold No.9 the Murray family moved in. Marty's children were from his first marriage with Jan. Diane was desperate for a child with Marty and the two tried for some time. In 2001 Diane became pregnant however she miscarried shortly after. The two then decided to begin IVF treatment and Marty borrowed money to fund it. The financial strain of the IVF put great pressure on the family with Marty wanting to stop and Diane wanting to sell the house in order to fund it. Eventually Marty persuaded Diane to finish the treatment. Later in 2001 Marty's 15-year-old daughter Adele became pregnant by Leo Johnson. Adele announced that she wanted an abortion, a decision that offended Diane's Catholic views but one that Marty supported. Adele felt guilty that she was having an abortion while Diane had miscarried and was struggling to conceive. Diane offered to bring up Adele's baby but with her father's support, she went ahead and had an abortion.

Marty was shocked to learn that his son Anthony was being bullied by two schoolgirls, Imelda Clough and her friend Paige. The two girls were forcing him to steal money to give to them. First, Marty, after seeing the girls humiliate Anthony, pulled Imelda away, but accidentally injured her by doing so. Marty later strongly encouraged Anthony to stand up for himself, losing his patience by hitting him when he did not do this, but later did by attacking Imelda with an iron bar. In response to this, Imelda's brothers turn up and a fight broke out on the close. After learning that Imelda's family are looking to press charges Anthony resolves not to return to school and Marty agrees to home-school him. When Marty finds Brigid, Anthony's tutor, educating him about religion rather than the academic content she was supposed to, he threw her out. Marty felt that Anthony's religious views led to him being bullied. Despite her usual Catholic perspective, Diane supports Marty in his decision.

Anthony later returned to school, where the bullying continued. Events reached a head when the two girls chased him into the toilet, threw water on him and stripped his clothes off. The head-mistress suspended the two girls for a week; while Paige left Anthony alone after this punishment, when Imelda returned she continued to bully Anthony, pretending to apologise at first but soon revealing her true colours. After school Anthony was chased by Imelda into the woods. In the ensuing struggle that took place, the two fell into the pond and Imelda hit her head on a rock. With Anthony holding her under the water, she accidentally drowned.

Anthony coped with the stress and guilt badly, smashing up a science lab and attacking another student with a metal bin when his head was pushed into a sink. Marty and Diane, however, were at a loss as to why their son was behaving in this way. After the Clough family turned up at the Murray house intending to force a confession from Anthony, the police later turned up to question him. The police soon dropped their interest in him, however, turning their attention to Marty after learning that a girl had gone missing in similar circumstances at a previous school where he had worked in Doncaster. After being interviewed by the police, Marty was abducted by Imelda's brothers and given a beating. Marty and Diane continued to worry about Anthony as he was having recurring nightmares and wetting the bed.

Later in 2002, Jan returned wanting to see her children. Both Steve and Adele first refuses to see her; Steve soon has a change of heart but Adele remains angry at Jan's presence. This also puts pressure on Marty and Diane's marriage. In November 2002 the police chased a group of armed robbers onto the Close. Finding they were at a dead end the robbers ran into the houses and kept the residents hostage. Marty, Jan, Steve, Adele and Anthony were held hostage while Diane was at work. The gunmen search the house to pass the time and find letters accusing Marty of paedophilia in a video case. The gunmen then decide to lock Marty in the cupboard. One of them then gives Adele a gun and tells her to shoot her father. When Adele is unable to do so, the gunmen make their best attempts to treat Marty sadistically; denying him drinking water and throwing it all over him instead. One of the robbers shoots Steve after he attacks him. Believing him to be dead, the robbers left him on the doorstep. Steve in fact had survived this incident and was treated in hospital later for his wounds. Cracking under pressure, Anthony admitted to Jan that he had killed Imelda. While Jan tried to listen, the conversation between the two began to annoy the robbers and their hushed tones were stopped.

Eventually, when one of the robbers, Terry Gibson, tried to escape, he grabbed Adele and ran across the woods. Pursued by a police helicopter, Terry shot at it causing it to stall and crash into the petrol station where Diane was working, killing her. Terry escaped while the other robbers were apprehended.

After Jan told Marty about Anthony's confession and Anthony later confirmed it, Marty decided he wanted to be sure and so visited the pond. This however was seen and reported to the police and Imelda's body was discovered. Marty was then arrested. Fearing that his father would be convicted for his crime, Anthony confessed to killing Imelda. Marty was released and Anthony was arrested. Anthony was later charged with Imelda's murder with the prosecution accusing him of luring Imelda into the woods with the intention of killing her. After a trial and a harrowing wait for the verdict Anthony received a not-guilty verdict much to the relief of Marty. Marty and Jan were at this time growing closer following the death of Diane. Jan suggested that Anthony could get away from his trouble by going to live with her in Salford, after he received faeces in the post. Imelda's mother threatened to kill him when Jan went to see her attempting to make peace.

After growing close Marty invited Jan to move in. Adele was against the idea and issued an ultimatum to Marty that she would move out. Much to Adele's surprise, Marty told her to go. Adele was shocked, but stuck to her word and moved in next door with Jimmy Corkhill and Tim O'Leary after persuading Tim to let her stay. After an altercation with Tim, however, Adele returned home and accepted Marty and Jan's relationship.

Marty proposed to Jan and she accepted. On the eve on their wedding Christy told Marty that he was not in favour of their marriage. When Marty quizzed him as to why Christy confesses to Marty that he had slept with Jan leading to Marty hitting Christy. Marty decided to marry Jan irrespective of this revelation, however Christy lost his place as best man, a position which was given to Anthony instead. Adele later left home bound for the University of Leeds, while Christy split up with Leanne and pretended to have leukemia hoping Leanne would stay with him out of sympathy. Christy later phoned Marty from his van about to take an overdose, but Marty managed to talk him out of it. After Cinerco tried to buy up the houses the residents were relieved when Max Farnham sold his house to a private buyer rather than Cinerco. This relief was short-lived when violent drug-dealer Jack Michaelson moved in.

Michaelson's daughter Suzie became friends with Anthony and the two started taking drugs she had stolen from her father. When Jack discovered cannabis in Suzie's room he stormed around to the Murray's and attacked Anthony, accusing him of supplying drugs to his daughter. When Jan protested Anthony's innocence Jack hit her, before threatening to torch the entire family if they reported him to the police.

Furious that Michaelson would hit his wife, Marty, Steve and Christy attacked Jack with planks of wood. Jack, however, retaliated by attacking Christy with a pick-axe handle. This caused him such injury that he required a kidney removing. Jan tried to persuade Marty to move and sell to Cinerco but he refused, seeing it as him being forced from his own house. Marty later received a call from the hospital saying that Anthony and Suzie were found collapsed in the park after overdosing on drugs. Marty decides this is the last straw and something must be done about Michaelson. After a visit from Barry Grant stirs things up the neighbours lynch Michaelson from his front window. The exact culprits were not revealed, however it is strongly implied that Marty and Steve were amongst them. The Murray family left after Jan persuaded Marty to sell the house. Adele returned to Leeds, Marty, Anthony and Jan left for a new house while Steve went into business with Tim in Wales.

== Reception ==
A critic from The Guardian included the Murrays in an article ridiculing soap characters. Of Marty they bemoaned "the Murray parents could usefully abandon their kids, who continually upstage them." A writer from said that The Gazette opined that the Murray family were the best new family in the show since the introduction of the Jordaches. Merle Brown from Daily Record believed that writers were not giving the Murray's good enough stories. She pleaded, "give them a decent, crazy Brookie storyline soon, please. All characters deserve at least one."
