= Steven Cole =

British actor

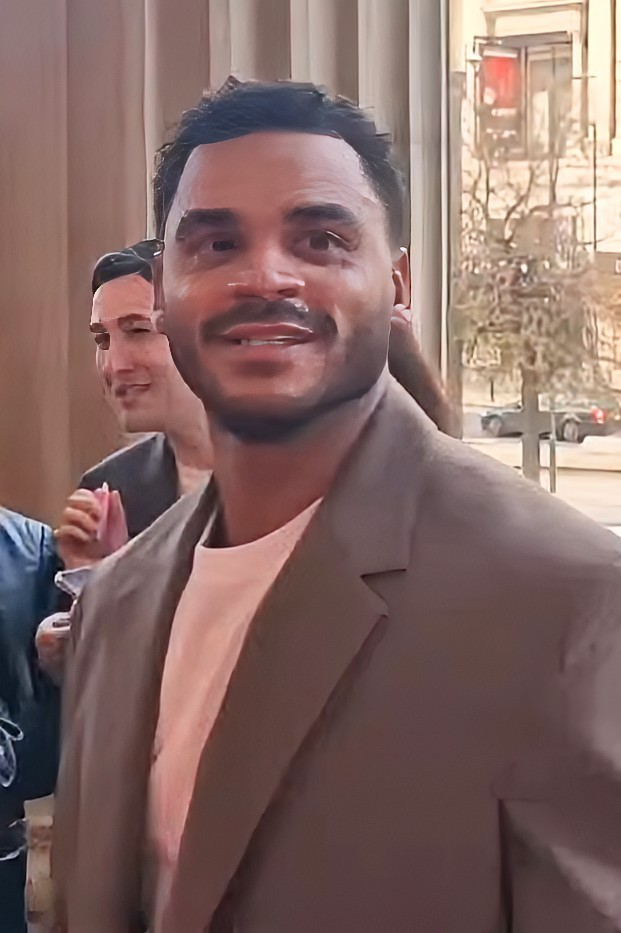
- Cole in 2025
- Born: 18 March 1982 (age 43); Liverpool, England
- Occupation: Actor
- Years active: 1996–present

Steven Cole (born 18 March 1982, in Liverpool) is a British actor best known for his portrayal of Leo Johnson in the Channel 4 Soap opera Brookside from 1996 to 2001.

He joined HBO's Game of Thrones during its second season to play the Dothraki Kovarro.
