= Barry Grant =

Fictional character from the Channel 4 soap opera Brookside

- Brookside character
- Portrayed by: Paul Usher
- Duration: 1982–1995, 1997–1998, 2003
- First appearance: 2 November 1982
- Last appearance: 4 November 2003
- Created by: Phil Redmond
- Spin-off appearances: Brookside: The Lost Weekend (1997)
- Crossover appearances: Hollyoaks (2025)
In-universe information
- Occupation: Joiner; Labourer; Businessman
- Father: Matty Nolan
- Mother: Sheila Corkhill
- Adoptive father: Bobby Grant
- Stepfather: Billy Corkhill
- Stepmother: Teresa Nolan
- Half-brothers: Damon Grant; Stephen Nolan; Joe Nolan
- Half-sisters: Karen Grant; Claire Grant; Maureen Nolan
- Sons: Stephen Pearson
- Uncles: Richard
- Aunts: Mary Nolan; Margaret Jefferson; Claire; Brenda
- Nephews: Simon McGrath
- First cousins: Matthew Jefferson; Helen Jefferson

Barry Grant is a fictional character from the British Channel 4 soap opera Brookside, played by Paul Usher. The character debuted on-screen during the first episode of Brookside, broadcast on 2 November 1982. Barry is one of the show's original characters and the only character to appear in the first and final episodes of Brookside. Usher decided to leave Brookside in 1984, but returned the following year and remained a regular cast member until 1995. He then returned for guest stints in 1997 and 2003. Actor Joe McGann was originally cast as Barry, but when McGann failed to gain an actors equity card, producers decided to recast the role to Usher. Barry is characterised as a "hard man" and constant law breaker. Writers transformed Barry into Brookside's long-standing villainous character. Despite his hard man characterisation, Barry has a special relationship with his mother Sheila Grant (Sue Johnston). He would do anything to protect Sheila and to the extent that it created problems with his father Bobby Grant (Ricky Tomlinson).

In his early years, writers portrayed a close friendship and double-act between Barry and Terry Sullivan (Brian Regan). Writers ended this when they created an affair between Barry and Terry's wife, Sue Sullivan (Annie Miles). Producers then turned Barry into a murderer when he kills Sue and her young son Danny, by pushing them off a scaffolding. The story helped celebrate Brookside's 1000th episode and was played out as a "whodunit" story, with viewers initially unaware that Barry was responsible. Another notable plot included scenes in which Barry threatens to kill a dog. The story created controversy with viewer complaints and news stories. Other stories include his association with gangster Tommy McArdle (Malcolm Tierney), his relationship with Tracy Corkhill (Justine Kerrigan) and her subsequent pregnancy. The character has proved popular with television critics and journalists, who often commented on Barry's numerous crimes and "bad boy" persona. Usher's performance was so memorable that Barry was still critiqued twenty years after Brookside was cancelled by Channel 4. Usher will reprise the role of Barry in a 2025 Brookside and Hollyoaks crossover episode as part of latter's 30th Anniversary.

== Casting ==
Actor Joe McGann was originally chosen to play the role of Barry. Brookside creator and executive producer Phil Redmond began workshopping the original cast, to see which actors built a rapport and could work well together on-screen. Only Sue Johnston was informed in advance of other cast members that she had secured a role but remained unaware as to which character she would play. All successful actors were invited to another audition on the Brookside set to perform improvisations in familial groups. McGann, Johnston, Ricky Tomlinson, Simon O'Brien and Shelagh O'Hara were grouped together and informed they were successful and would portray the Grant family. McGann was refused an actors equity card and producers had to recast the role with Paul Usher.

Usher received a letter inviting him to audition for the role of Barry. He attended three auditions and was successful in gaining the role after McGann could not continue. Usher was unemployed at the time of his audition. He told Richard McLaren from TV Guide that he was "desperate to work" and "went a bit over the top" in his first audition. Usher did not know anything about the role but they told him to sit down and talk about "thieving and robbing gear". Usher found the subjects easy and he won the role. On his first day of filming he feared that producers would drop him from the show. He told McLaren "I didn't really know what the part was about." Usher was the only cast member to appear in the first and last episodes of Brookside.

== Development ==
=== Characterisation ===
When the series begins, Barry is in his mid-twenties and lives with his family consisting of his mother Sheila Grant (Johnston), father Bobby Grant (Ricky Tomlinson) and his two younger siblings Karen Grant (O'Hara) and Damon Grant (O'Brien). Prior to the series' debut, Channel 4 publicity described Barry as a twenty-three year old "football fanatic and a carpenter on a building site. He has a reputation as a hard-man." Barry is portrayed as different from the rest of his family. Early on in his story Barry gets involved in law-breaking scams, yet his mother, who is a devout Catholic is willing to ignore his behaviour. In the book Brookside: The Official Companion, show creator, Redmond explained that there was a special relationship between the two. Barry would do anything for Sheila to the extent it creates conflict with his father, Bobby. Writers portrayed Barry helping Sheila overcome her rape ordeal. He takes her shopping and encourages her to be brave. Bobby becomes more jealous of their bond because he had failed to help Sheila deal with her attack. Barry and Bobby find it difficult to tolerate one another and the latter views his son as a jobless "layabout". He believes that Barry has succumbed to Conservative propaganda and should find work and stop gallivanting. Barry rarely speaks to his father unless it is to argue with him. Bobby is a socialist and thinks that Barry's generation lack commitment. They are both jealous of one another's relationships with Sheila and writers often used it to create tension between them. Redmond wrote that "Sigmund Freud would have had a field day" studying the dynamic between the three characters. Barry is characterised as a "nihilist" and the type to start a fight with anyone who questions his behaviour.

Barry's association with gangster Tommy McArdle (Malcolm Tierney) during 1984 created problems for the Grants. Barry had nearly been caught committing crimes and his deals with Tommy brought his family "pain and despair". After five years on-screen, writers began to humanise Barry more. Redmond described a more "thoughtful and conscience" Barry, who had "mellowed with age". The change did not last as Barry became a source of evil in storylines. Originally depicted as Sheila's protector and a "Jack the lad" type character, with money making scams alongside his best friend Terry Sullivan (Brian Regan). Barry viewed himself as a "hard case" always willing to defend his family using violence. Stories which involved Barry with serious gangsters such as Tommy and Sizzler (Renny Krupinski) transformed the character into a sinister one. Usher was delighted with the changes and thought it made the character more complex. He told Geoff Tibballs, author of Brookside - The First Ten Years, that "I'm glad we're seeing the nasty side of Barry Grant, I wanted to make him more evil. He's a more interesting character than just a Mammy's boy." Writers had made him a "man of power" and to facilitate this they made him a property owner, purchasing the shops on Brookside Parade. The power Barry gains corrupts him and with stories involving shot gun toting threats and murder, they showed he was unpleasant and nasty. Barry became self-serving and bitter towards Sheila for moving in with Billy Corkhill (John McArdle). Another showing of his newfound wealth was having a celebrity opening of his restaurant. Producers hired Paul O'Grady for a cameo appearance as his drag queen persona Lily Savage for the opening.

Brookside producer Mal Young revealed that Usher was vocal about Barry's transformation into a "shady businessman". They changed his appearance opting to dress him in suits rather than jeans. However, Young was careful not to lose Barry's early characterisation entirely. He added "we've done it without losing the heart of Barry Grant. He's still Sheila Grant's son, the lad from Liverpool." Usher too was still wary of not losing Barry's conscience and wanted writers to showcase it more often. He explained that Barry is "very lonely and I reckon he goes through hell." Usher also believed that Barry "suffers" emotionally when he commits serious crimes. In 1994, Young said that Barry represented ten years of Margaret Thatcher's Britain. At times Barry's characterisation made him Brookside's "hate figure". Usher told Jane Cameron from TV Quick that "at least it shows the audience think about him. Barry succeeds because he provokes a negative reaction."

=== Departure (1984) ===
In November 1984, Peter Holt from the Evening Standard reported that Usher had decided to leave Brookside to concentrate on his music career. They added that he would depart during the following Christmas episodes. Usher had also tired of the role and the public thinking he was similar to Barry. Usher told an Eleanor Levy from the Record Mirror that "I think I've just exhausted the character, the part's already there, it's written for you and there's nothing really to test your acting ability." In an interview with McLaren (TV Guide), Usher stated that he was exhausted because of the role and would not bother changing out of Barry's costumes when he got home. Barry's departure storyline featured Barry moving to live in the city of Wolverhampton. However, the actor returned to filming and re-joined the cast within one year. Usher later revealed that he had negotiated his contract with producers to include more holiday time. Each year Usher was allowed to have three months off and writers would send Barry overseas on a "dodgy business trip". Usher later stated that "it's hard work playing Barry and without taking a break each year, I wouldn't have been able to carry on for as long as I have."

=== Dog threat controversy ===
Brookside's creator and producer Phil Redmond wanted the show to include dramatic and controversial content. He also wanted a new story to get the public talking about Brookside again. He made a conscious effort to transform Barry from low level crook to full time gangster. Redmond decided a good was to portray Barry's descent into serious crime was to have him kidnap a pet dog belonging to an amusement arcade owner, Ma Johnson (Mary Cunningham). She owed money for protection and Barry kidnaps the dog with a sinister threat. Sizzler forces Barry to threaten to decapitate the dog unless Ma Johnson pays the money.

Redmond wanted the storyline to show that Sizzler was evil and out to hurt people. He believed that viewers found Sizzler comical and entertaining and that the dog scenes would rectify that. Redmond explained that it was controversial because animal abuse is frowned upon in British society. It was so controversial that most of those at Mersey TV fought with Redmond over the issue. When Redmond pitched his idea at a storyline conference, his team of writers rejected it and claimed it would not be possible to show a dog being killed on television. Redmond ignored their protests and went ahead with his plans. He added that writers just wanted to frighten the dog instead. Redmond said the plot was inspired by the film, The Godfather, which includes an infamous scene a gangster removes a horses head in revenge. He believed that Sizzler would own the film on video and think it was a brilliant idea to copy in his own revenge plan. Barry Woodward was tasked with writing the scenes and included the discussion of the gruesome act in his draft. When admin typed the episode up, they were unhappy with it and complained to Redmond. He told them to mind their own business. Then at rehearsals, the director tried to remove the scene. The cast then expressed their disapproval but Redmond remained adamant, but they tried again to stop the scene on the day of location filming. Then during the editing process, the scene was deleted. They had to re-edit it in and it was sent to Channel 4, who telephoned Redmond with their worries. He managed to talk them around and the episode was broadcast.

The scene in which Barry threatens the dog formed the cliff-hanger of the Friday night episode and complaints about the show were made. Redmond recalled that it was "expected" from "dog obsessed Britain". However, more people complained about the storyline than they did about Sheila's rape storyline. The next episode was not broadcast until days later, which revealed the dogs fate as Barry spares its life. Redmond recalled that "We showed that even hard-hearted Barry couldn't bring himself to harm a dog." Redmond found it difficult to deal with the fallout from the storyline. He claimed that a woman spoke to Brookside's head of publicity daily following the broadcast. He soon tired of her complaining and asked if she had seen the film, The Godfather. The woman claimed it was her favourite film but refused to accept any comparison between the two. She believed that killing a pet dog was worse than killing a horse. In 1999, Redmond recalled "I will now admit publicly, was a deliberate injection of shock therapy to a storyline chronicling Barry Grant's descent into serious crime. It was designed to remind viewers that although Barry was a loveable rogue and the gangsters he was involved with at the time were an entertaining bunch, he was still about to sell his soul to the devil."

=== Who killed Sue & Danny? ===
Barry begins an affair with Terry's wife Sue Sullivan (Annie Miles). Brookside fans reacted well to Barry and Sue's romance and viewership ratings began to rise. Mal Young decided to kill off Sue in a mystery whodunit murder storyline, following Miles' decision to leave the series. Brookside was nearing its 1000th episode and the production team wanted to create a memorable story to coincide with it. In addition, Young decided to kill off Sue's young son, Danny. Killing a child on-screen was controversial and had not been done before on a British soap opera. When the story was first pitched to writers, they believed it was too risky and they did not want to proceed. Young liked the reaction and decided that it would maximise interest in the show as they took it into the 1990s. To further add to the interest, Young wanted a "whodunit" narrative to keep the audience guessing. Only Young and Redmond knew that Sue and Danny would be murdered by Barry. They kept his identity a secret from Usher, the rest of the cast and the film crew. Young believed that in doing so, the story retained its authenticity as a mystery plot. The characters of Barry, Terry and Graeme Curtis were all dressed in white t-shirts, jeans and trainers. This narrowed the murderer down but kept the audience guessing.

Sue and Danny's death occurs after they are pushed from a scaffolding. When the scenes were filmed, a shot of Sue being grabbed showed that Barry could be the killer. A view of the killer's legs was included to allude that Terry was the killer. Then a scene showing a telephone revealed that it could have been Graeme. In addition an extra matching their physicality was filmed climbing stairs in-case it was a completely different character. This confused the crew, who demanded to know who Sue's killer was. Young did not reveal the culprit because he believed that the actor would portray their character more sinisterly. Young and Redmond knew the whodunit story would create increased complaints and fan mail. It was so successful that viewers had become invested in solving the mystery themselves. When the episode was broadcast, viewers recorded the episode and replayed it to try and identify the killer. Young received eighty letters who spotted that the jeans were Terry's and believed it could not have been Barry. Some viewers also printed off freeze-frames of what they believed the killer was wearing. Despite their findings, Young remained adamant that Barry would be revealed as Sue and Danny's killer.

When Barry was eventually revealed as the culprit, some viewers refused to accept it. Choosing Barry had worried Young because he feared the viewers would hate Barry. Viewers wrote in calling Barry a "bastard" but they often expressed their desire for him to remain in the show. Young told Tibballs that "I was concerned about how you retain sympathy for a murderer. People said he must be caught and put away, justice must be seen to be done. But it's a fact of life that murderers are walking around free. We always aim to be realistic so I thought, 'let's go for it'." Usher was also nervous about the reaction he would get from the general public. He had reservations about Barry murdering a child and asked Young if he was sure he wanted to proceed. Young added that the viewer reaction proved he made the correct decision and called Barry "an enigma" and likened him to the fictional character J. R. Ewing, who viewers love to hate.

The story had longevity providing Barry with related stories in the following years. On example was Barry's disgruntled lover Fran Pearson (Julie Peasgood) informing Terry that Barry had an affair with Sue. The revelation was long-awaited and producers wanted dramatic scenes for the reveal episodes. The main episode numbered 1049 became one of the show's most problematic. Young had envisioned a violent reaction from Terry. His retaliation initially included throwing a chip pan of hot fat over Barry and threatening him with a knife. A series of blunders and objections from Channel 4 caused the content to change. Writers drafted the fight scenes but when it came to filming the episodes, miscommunication ruined Young's plans. Usher and Regan filmed the fight scene during one shoot for a Friday night episode. Their fight was supposed to continue and explore Barry's injuries from the hot fat. The following Monday night episode was filmed with a different director and crew. The two crews had not conversed and the second crew shot their episode with Barry having a knife cut instead of burns from hot fat. Young was upset with the edits and wanted to reshoot. Usher was unavailable for filming due to a holiday and could not be contacted.

Regan had to film new scenes by himself, including throwing a pan of hot fat onto the kitchen floor and pretending to approach Barry with a knife. The Independent Television Commission discovered that Brookside were planning to broadcast the violent knife scenes. They requested to view the episode and decided that scenes with the knife could be broadcast on the Friday evening but not during the Sunday omnibus edition. However, when they witnessed the following episode in which Terry holds a knife to Barry's throat, they refused to allow it to be broadcast. This happened three days prior to its planned broadcast. Producers waited outside Usher's home until he returned from his holiday. They asked him to come straight to the studio and film new content. Two days prior they filmed new confrontation scenes and Barry's injuries now came from Terry trapping his hand in a door. They cut the scene, took it to be edited and managed to get it to Channel 4 the following morning.

In May 1992, writers created a special two-hander episode featuring only Barry and Terry. It was also the milestone 1100th episode and it featured Barry and Terry the confrontational "showdown" over Barry's secrets. On Barry's decision to confess to Terry, Usher stated "he certainly suffered over the death of Sue and Danny - that's why he finally had to tell Terry exactly what happened." Producers then gave Usher four months off work while the character was written out temporarily. On-screen Barry flees to Madrid and hides out while Terry comes to terms with the events. Barry decides he wants to return home but is worried that Terry will tell the police about Sue and Danny's deaths. Usher told TV Quick's Cameron that "relations between them are quite strained, to say the least." Barry invites Terry to visit him in Spain so that they can discuss what has happened. Usher was happy that producers decided to rest the character. He told Cameron that "it makes for good storylines when Barry disappears, and then comes back to cause even more trouble."

=== Tracy Corkhill ===
Barry begins a relationship with Tracy Corkhill (Justine Kerrigan). The relationship is awkward because Barry's mother and Tracy's father Billy are already in a relationship. Tracy moves out and gets a flat of her own and the pair find it easier to continue their affair. Their parents however are unhappy and try to convince them to split up. The story was developed over the next five months, with Tracy discovering that she is pregnant with Barry's child.

=== Departure and returns ===
In 1995, Usher decided to leave the show once again. This time his character abruptly left the show following a series of redemption plots for Barry. The character had proposed marriage to Emma, a kind Catholic woman who did not believe in sex before marriage. Barry even attended Mass and was shown regretting some of his earlier decisions. His departure storyline was abrupt as Barry suddenly disappears and Emma is portrayed as frantic and wondering why her fiancé has left her.

Lizzie Francke from The Guardian reported that Usher's quick exit was due to a disagreement between himself and producers. Francke stated that Usher was unhappy with changes to Barry's characterisation and he subsequently wanted to leave. A Brookside publicist told Francke that Usher was taking a break from the series and Barry's departure was pre-planned. Barry's departure was left open ended so a return would be easy. He had fled to Florida, but the story remained unexplained for almost three years. It was later confirmed that Usher had in fact quit the role.

In August 1997, it was announced that Usher had agreed to reprise the role once again. Usher agreed to a three-month contract, despite producers request he stay for one year. Of his return, a Brookside publicist stated that "he will be back just as he left, in his Armani suit, his four wheel drive and a bulge in his pocket - a gun." In addition, producers persuaded Johnston to reprise her role as Sheila for a special episode released on VHS video. The special, Brookside: The Lost Weekend was also designed to attract long-time viewers with the return of old characters such as Barry and Sheila. It explores Lindsey's kidnapping and Barry's reaction. Of his return, Usher revealed that Barry would become more violent than ever. The character was once again written out of the series in January 1998. He leaves after he breaks Lindsey Corkhill's (Claire Sweeney) heart and returns to Wolverhampton to be with his family.

In 2003, Usher reprised the role to appear in the final episode of Brookside following its cancellation. His final story features fellow former character Lindsey. The episode was broadcast on 4 November 2003. Their return story reveals that Barry and Lindsey formed a relationship off-screen and they seek the blessing of Lindsey's father, Jimmy Corkhill (Dean Sullivan). However, Barry soon gets caught up in the drama on Brookside Close involving gangster Jack Michaelson (Paul Duckworth).

On 28 August 2025, it was announced that Usher had reprised his role as Barry for a Brookside and Hollyoaks crossover episode, which is to commemorate latter's 30th Anniversary. His return was announced alongside McArdle as Barry's step-father, Billy. Of his return, Usher stated he was "looking forward to seeing all of the old faces." His return was announced following the confirmation that Johnston would also returning to her role as Sheila.

== Reception ==
"[Barry is] unable to enjoy close relationships, he leads a solitary existence, expresses little pleasure and is emotionally cold. His aloofness is experienced by the women in Brookside as different and exotic, a hint of the outside world. And of course there's his money. They think that Barry will look after them but they'd be very wrong. He is attracted to and repulsed by women, because of his exceptionally close relationship with his mother, Sheila. His Oedipal crisis has never resolved."

— A Guardian writer analysing Barry. (1998)

Writers from The Guardian have often critiqued the character. Neil Crossley branded Barry a "nefarious" character, Catherine Wilson believed he was a "garrulous" man and Hilary Bower viewed him as a "heart-throb". Gareth McLean said that "Barry Grant has always had women trouble. He tormented Jacqui Dixon, toyed with Lindsey Corkhill's affections and made Sue Sullivan take a tumble of some scaffolding to her death." Another Guardian writer assessed "from his early days as a cheeky youngster at number 5, Barry Grant developed into a money obsessed 'scally'. By the late 1980s he had become the villain at the head of a gangland empire." Lizzie Francke (also The Guardian) said that Barry has a "famous scowl" and branded him a "fickle" character. Discussing his alleged walk out, Francke added "if Usher wants to bargain with Redmond and co, at least there is the huge popularity of Barry in his favour." In 1991, Jim Shelley praised Brookside for returning to its classic story telling. He commented that the show "has shown sign of revival to returning to what it is good at (violent, tragi-comic crime stories), with the escapades of Barry Grant and the hapless Jimmy Corkhill." Shelley was later delighted with Barry's 1997 return and joked that it called for a street party and a public holiday. He quipped that by the end of the episode, Barry had already uttered his famous catchphrases (such as "You Wha?" and "You're jokin' aren'tya") and womanised a regular female character. Shelley later assessed that the era where Barry and Beth Jordache (Anna Friel) were prominent were the show's "golden days".

Another Guardian journalist analysed Barry and suggested he has a psychopathic disorder. They branded him "emotionally cold", inept of pleasure and living a solitary life. His "aloofness" is enjoyed by women who experience it as "exotic" and "different" but they fail to see that he cannot look after them. In addition they believed that Barry had never gotten over Damon's murder and replaced him with Terry. They opined that their friendship had homosexual undertones and that Barry expressed this by sleeping with Sue and later killing her. They added that Barry ultimately controlled and destroyed Terry. The writer concluded that "This man need to be locked up. It would take a long time to resolve this kind of conflict." In the book, "The Guinness Book of Classic British TV", authors Paul Cornell, Martin Day, and Keith Topping wrote that Barry and Terry's friendship had endured "many ups and downs". They profiled Terry as "an accomplice to Barry's dodgy money making schemes" and victim to Barry's villainy. They concluded that the friendship was not all losses on Terry's behalf, noting that Barry "inevitably" chose Terry over his girlfriend Penny Crosbie (Mary Tamm).

Journalists at the Evening Standard also ridiculed and praised the character. Lisa O'Carroll opined that Barry is "ruthless" and a "rogue". She added "Barry is still one of most popular characters, and his constant plotting and womanising means he can appear and disappear from the soap at will." Another journalist from the publication described Barry as an "all-round heartbreaker and baddie." In addition, fellow Evening Standard writer Nicholas Hellen branded him a "bad boy". Geoffrey Phillips was dissatisfied with "TV yobbery" and called for an end to it. Phillips' prime example of such yobbery was "Barry Grant in Brookside drinking straight from the milk bottle that he has just picked out of someone else's fridge." Seven years later, Phillips branded Barry a "swine" and launched a tirade stating that Barry "is a little crook with, from what we saw of it, a large pistol. His hair contains more than half the world's known oil reserves and his voice puts one in mind of nails being fed into a garden-shredder." Phillips later described Barry as a "local bad lad with come-to-bed eyes and gone-to-hell hairstyle." Phillips said that the never ending Who Killed Sue and Danny storyline was "like a packet of cornflakes: there always seems to be something more rattling around at the bottom." Another Evening Standard critic stated "many a female pulse has quickened" following Barry's return. They added that "his presence in Brookside ensures excitement if not an upturn in the level of genteel conversation. Still, we do not expect soft words from a man whose voice suggests a bag of nails going round in the spin-drier." In another review from the newspaper, Barry was described as having a low IQ. They added that "barmy Barry" has a "stretch-limo mouth", a "bubble-car brain" and is the type of man that "orangutan mothers" warn their daughters about.

A writer from TV Quick branded Barry "soap's biggest rotter". William Leith writing for The Observer branded Barry a "sneering, emotionally retarded criminal". Of the character's behaviour, Leith documented that "Barry would come on and stare meanly at people and steal things, and drive too fast, and have heartless sex; he was just like the slightly older boys who got the really good-looking girls when I was a teenager, and ended up as mechanics or penniless dreamers; he was a cheap male version of a short-skirted girl with a push-up bra." Kathryn Flett wrote that Barry was like the junior version Den Watts played by Leslie Grantham, a villainous character from the rival soap opera EastEnders. Barbara Ellen, also from The Observer said that by 1997, typical archetype males in soap opera had evolved from "blue-collar love-thugs with beer guts" such as Terry Duckworth (Nigel Pivaro) to "smouldering Heathcliff's" such as Barry and EastEnders' David Wicks (Michael French). Noticing the void caused by Barry and David's departures from their respective shows, the Evening Standard's Phillips stated "love rats they may have been but, as pets, rodents are more fun than worms."

Mark Lawson from The Independent bemoaned the amount of criminal stories that were being created for Barry and EastEnders character Grant Mitchell (Ross Kemp), believing they were influencing society. Lawson opined that there were too many fires in Brookside, such Barry burning down Jimmy's shop. He added "are all seriously dangerous people, at a time when random or unusual violence is an almost weekly news story." From The Independent, Paul Vallely opined that Usher and Sweeney acted as "the emotional catalysts" of Brookside's final episode. By 1994, Barry was the longest-running character featured in the show. Gerard Gilbert observed Barry "metamorphosing from mean-bastard scally to mean-bastard entrepreneur." Their colleague Anthony Hayward called Barry a "Jack the Lad whose own money-making scams became more sinister and dangerous." A journalist from the Record Mirror said that Barry was "one of the most popular characters". Another stated that Barry was the "proverbial bad penny" and stated that his most memorable moment was being beaten up by Tommy McArdle. Richard McLaren from TV Guide branded Barry the "resident Brookside scally" and "wayward". His colleague Nick Fisher called Barry a "bad-boy-cum-heart-throb".

In the book Real Soap: Brookside, author Kay Nicholls likened Barry's early style to a "70s footballer, with a wardrobe that would shame Mr Byrite." She added he was not "heart-throb fodder" until writers transformed him into "Mr Smooth" and the show's "rogue". Nicholls believed that Barry assumed a role that "Al Pacino would be proud of." She wrote that Sue and Danny's murder was his most famous storyline and branded him an "evil bastard" for his treatment of Fran. In another description Nicholls concluded that he was "businessman Barry - briefcase in one hand, shotgun in the other." Di Hollingsworth from Soaplife included Barry killing Sue and Danny in their list of top ten soap storylines in which characters get away with committing crimes. She added that Barry is "rotten to the core" and his affair with Sue was "bad enough" but he "put himself beyond the pale" by killing her. Hollingsworth also branded him a "nasty piece of work" and a "ruthless romeo" who had "no trouble getting girls into bed". "He managed to love and lose a string of Brookie babes - most of them already married." Barry was inducted into All About Soap magazine's Hall of Fame in November 2003. Their writer, Lisa Marks noted the characters numerous crimes and relationships as reasons. She also stated that Barry "always had a shady deal on the go", noted "he wasn't always so nice" and branded him the show's "curly haired killer".

Barry and Terry were referenced in the lyrics to the Blazing Saddles song titled "Free George Jackson", which was released in 1985. The character was featured in Channel 4's 2001 documentary Top Ten TV Villains. A Guardian reporter added that Barry was the "numero uno Merseyside Mafioso". In a 2001 Guardian feature profiling soap opera's highest moments, "bad Barry" murdering Sue made the list.

Barry's villainous reputation did not wane in the years after Brookside's cancellation. In 2019, Susannah Alexander from Digital Spy said that Barry was "villainous" and a "Brookside legend". Their colleague Justin Harp called Barry an "evil" character and Simon Timblick from Radio Times described him as the "baddie businessman". In July 2020, Sophie McCoid from the Liverpool Echo referred to Barry as a "Brookside legend". Claire Crick writing for What's on TV branded Barry the "Brookside baddie" who spent "two decades causing havoc". A reporter from Heart radio described Barry as one of the show's "most iconic villains". They called his biggest stories being his expulsion from school and his involvement with gangsters. They added that he "famously" killed Sue and Danny. In 2021, Katy Brent from Closer said that soap opera villains such as Coronation Street's Pat Phelan (Connor McIntyre) and Hollyoaks' Warren Fox (Jamie Lomas) "have nothing on the original soap bad boy, Barry." She added that "he once popped a gun up a rival's bottom when he tried to rape his girlfriend. You don't get that in Corrie. He was pretty phwoar as well."
