= Mick Johnson =

Fictional character from Brookside and Hollyoaks

- Brookside and Hollyoaks character
- Portrayed by: Louis Emerick
- Duration: 1989–2001, 2024–present
- First appearance: 12 April 1989 (Brookside); 8 April 2024 (Hollyoaks)
- Last appearance: 22 August 2001 (Brookside)
- Introduced by: Phil Redmond (1989); Hannah Cheers and Angelo Abela (2024)
- Spin-off appearances: Brookside: The Lost Weekend (1997); Brookside: Friday the 13th (1998); Hollyoaks Later (2025)
In-universe information
- Other names: Michael Anthony Johnson; Donny Clark
- Occupation: Taxi driver Shopkeeper; Detective Inspector
- Brothers: Ellis Johnson
- Wife: Josie Christie (until 1993); Elaine Davies (1997–1999); Maggie (divorced)
- Sons: Leo Johnson; Andre Clark
- Daughters: Gemma Johnson; Vicky Grant
- Stepdaughters: Tanya Davies
- Uncles: Charlie
- First cousins: Frank Johnson
- Other relatives: Jerome Johnson

Mick Johnson (also Donny Clark) is a fictional character from the British soap operas Brookside and Hollyoaks, played by Louis Emerick. The character made his first appearance during the Brookside episode airing on 12 April 1989. Emerick made his final Brookside appearance on 22 August 2001. Initially believed to be dead after a house fire, it was revealed that Mick survived and had been residing in Hollyoaks village as "Donny Clark" during the soap's 30th anniversary. This makes Mick the second character, after Matt Musgrove, to transition to another soap.

== Casting ==
Emerick had been unable to pay off a telephone bill and a woman named Rita offered to pay it. He refused and instead requested that Rita contact his agent should any acting work arise. He credits her for helping him secure the role of Mick. His first day on set was spent with Brian Regan (who played Terry Sullivan). Mick's first scenes involved him picking up a dead body in his taxi with Terry. By 1998, Emerick was on a £70,000 contract with the show.

== Development ==
In 1992, producers created a new potential love story for Mick and Marianne Dwyer (Jodie Hanson). They spent months falling in love but being unable to act on their feelings. Writers then made the story more complex by creating a relationship between Marianne and Mick's brother, Ellis Johnson (Francis Johnson). Hanson told a reporter from TVTimes that Marianne and Ellis "got caught up in the whirlwind of romance." Their romance progresses fast and they get engaged. Hanson stated that Marianne tries to convince herself that her feelings for Mick is just "sisterly warmth" and that she loves Ellis. The two brothers have very different characteristics which both appeal to Marianne. Hanson described Mick the "solid and responsible" brother and Ellis as the "charming and vivacious" one. She can have a good time with Ellis but ultimately, Mick has the "steadfastness she needs in a husband."

Writers continued to play Mick as an integral part of the story. Mick and Marianne's romantic feelings did not wane, despite her protests. On New Year's Eve 1992, Mick and Marianne share a kiss and betray Ellis. They both decide to keep their infidelity a secret, and Marianne gets engaged to Ellis. Two months later, writers used the reintroduction of Mick's ex-wife, Josie Johnson (Suzanne Packer) to further complicate the narrative. When Marianne witnesses Mick and Josie together, she is "consumed with jealousy" and proceeds with her wedding in a state of upset.

Emerick told Tina Miles of the Liverpool Echo that he was fortunate to be given "great storylines" such as being stalked and committing an act of euthanasia.

== Reception ==
Jon Horsley from Yahoo! stated "Louis Emerick added wit and humour to the often bleak soap and became one of its most loved and recognisable characters." He named Mick's most memorable storylines as being the victim of racial abuse and a steroid addiction. A reporter from the Manchester Evening News has branded Mick as "loveable" and admitted they missed watching the character. A writer from Hello! believed that Emerick was a Brookside favourite with viewers. Author of Black in the British Frame Stephen Bourne opined that Mick was an inoffensive black character, much like Alan Jackson (Howard Antony), a character from rival soap opera EastEnders. Bourne described them both as "good, reliable, hard-working fathers, and as well-integrated members of their communities." In the book, "The Guinness Book of Classic British TV", it was noted that accused other soap operas of tokenism in their portrayal of ethnic minority characters. They believed Brookside offered a more realistic portrayal via Mick's character. Authors Paul Cornell, Martin Day and Keith Topping added that "Mick Johnson, for example, works entirely contrary to offensive black male stereotypes, being a good father, hard-working and honest." Francesca Babb from All About Soap included the euthanasia storyline involving Mick, Elaine and Gladys in their "most memorable moments" of Brookside feature.

Vicki Coppock, writing for the radical feminist magazine, Trouble & Strife was critical about Mick and complained that he was portrayed more positively than Josie and Marianne because they ended their relationships with him. She complained that Josie was villainised for daring to abandon her family, which "evoked sympathy for the long-suffering and ever-patient Mick." Coppock was also annoyed with Marianne's sexual harassment storyline because it "focused mainly on Mick's angst over the situation." She added his reaction was "stereotypically spontaneous, aggressive and confrontational. The Black working-class 'male protector' of 'his' woman was set against Marianne's cool, scheming, feminine guile." She concluded that "the subtext of these storylines carried clear expressions of misogyny and racism." When Marianne leaves Mick, Coppock complained that instead of portraying it as a positive decision for her, writers created a "narrative which ensured maximum sympathy for Mick. Marianne was once again cast as the villain, deserting Mick in his hour of need."

In 2025, Chloe Timms from Inside Soap wrote, "we love Donny – sometimes we wish he was our dad too!"
