= Louis Emerick =

British actor (born 1960)

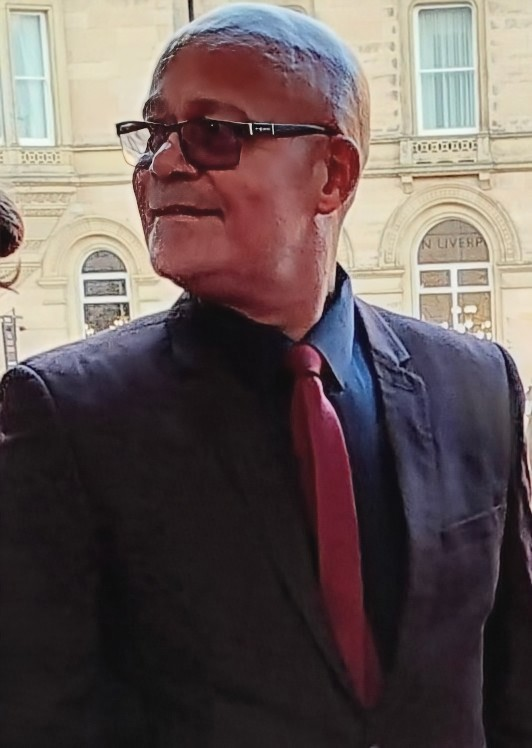
- Emerick in 2025
- Born: Louis Emerick Grant; 10 June 1960 (age 66); Toxteth, Liverpool, England
- Occupation: Actor
- Years active: 1982–present

Louis Emerick Grant (born 10 June 1960) is a British television actor, known for his role as Mick Johnson in the Channel 4 soap operas Brookside and Hollyoaks as well as his appearances in the BBC soap opera Doctors.

== Life and career ==
He was born in the Toxteth area of Liverpool to a Liberian father and British mother. He is the youngest of ten children. He is best known for his portrayal of Mick Johnson in the soap opera Brookside. He also played PC Walsh in 55 episodes of Last of the Summer Wine (1988, 1989, and 2004–2010). In 2003, Emerick was cast in four episodes of Casualty as Mike Bateman, the fireman husband of Tess Bateman (Suzanne Packer). Emerick and Packer had co-starred as a married couple on Brookside. He has also had roles in New Tricks, The Bill, Benidorm, Waterloo Road, Cold Feet and Coronation Street. He has appeared in films such as Layer Cake. He came third in the 2008 series of Celebrity Master Chef.

In 2014, Emerick starred in an episode of the soap opera Doctors. In September 2014, Emerick began playing the role of Horse in the touring production of The Full Monty. He has also starred in several other plays and pantos. 2016–present he stars in Dave TV comedy Zapped as Herman the Munty pub landlord. In 2018, Emerick had a brief recurring role as Mike in the long-running soap opera Coronation Street. Then in 2020, he appeared in an episode of the BBC soap opera Doctors as Gary Taile.

In June 2023, Emerick was given a 26-week suspended prison sentence after careless driving and hitting two girls with his car, causing serious injury in October 2022.

== Filmography ==
=== Film ===
Year	Title	Role(s)	Notes
1988	The Fruit Machine	Billy	
2004	Layer Cake	Trevor	
2015	Lapse of Honour	Bruce	
2017	Habit	Dave	
2020	Out of Time	Mr. Richardson	
2022	Saving Christmas Spirit	Coach Ferguson	
2023	Bolan's Shoes	Simon	
2023	Our Kid	Tucker	
2024	Bilby	Percy	
2026	Semolina Pilchard	Billy Donnelly	
TBA	Kung Fury 2	Vice President	Post-production

=== Television ===
Year	Title	Role(s)	Notes
1985	The Practice	Garage Attendant	2 episodes
1986	Coronation Street	Van Man	Episode: #1.2645
1988–1989, 2004–2010	Last of the Summer Wine	PC Walsh	55 episodes
1987	Home to Roost	Policeman	Episode: "Crime Watch"
1988	Floodtide	Det. Sgt. Timms	2 episodes
1988	The Ray Bradbury Theatre	Listener's Assistant	Episode: "There Was an Old Woman"
1989	The Play on One	Bill	Episode: "A View of Harry Clark"
1989–2001	Brookside	Mick Johnson	1037 episodes
1989	Children's Ward	Mick	Episode: #1.10
1989	Screen One	Fitness	Episode: "Ball-Trap on the Cote Sauvage"
2001	Cold Feet	Rick	Episode: #4.3
2002	Merseybeat	Phil Brack	3 episodes
2002	Doctors	Sgt. Frank Bristow	Episode: "Occupational Hazards"
2003	Holby City	Michael Denton	Episode: "Hair of the Dog"
2003	The Bill	David Ackroyd	Episode: "A Smart Bomb"
2003–2006	Casualty	Mike Bateman	13 episodes
2004	Mile High	Jez	Episode: #2.5
2006	Doctors	Clive Williams	Episode: "A Different Kind of Love"
2007	Liverpool Nativity	Magi	TV film
2008	Waterloo Road	Peter O'Brien	Episode: "#3.11"
2008	Stepdad	Arresting Officer	TV film
2008	Trexx and Flipside	Guru Desmond	Episode: "Kings of Da Hood"
2009	Blue Murder	Harrison	Episode: "Private Sins: Part 2"
2010	Holby City	Keith Ryan	Episode: "Too Cold to Crash and Burn"
2011	Justice	Patrick Dempsey	3 episodes
2012	Hollyoaks Later	Policeman	Episode: #5.3
2012	Crime Stories	Ray Carroll	Episode: #1.6
2013	Silent Witness	Kenny Barber	2 episodes
2014–2016	Benidorm	Norman the Doorman	3 episodes
2014	New Tricks	Neil Murphy	Episode: "Romans Ruined"
2014	Educating Bitchfield	Craig	Episode: "School on Report"
2014	Doctors	Owen Abbot	Episode: "Finding Alfie"
2016–2018	Zapped	Herman	All 15 episodes
2016	Moving On	Les	Episode: "Zero"
2017	Pacino and Bert	Hi-Vis Man	TV film
2017	Elf: The Musical	Santa Claus	TV film
2017	Eric, Ernie and Me	Dave	TV film
2017	Walls and Bridges	Dougie	TV film
2018	Coronation Street	Mike Thornberry	16 episodes
2020	Doctors	Gary Taile	Episode: "The Ol' Nudge Nudge"
2020	Broke	Killa Clive	All 6 episodes
2020	Run	Ron Walker	All 4 episodes
2020	The Other One	Pat	Episode: #1.4
2020	Lockdown Lifeline	Robert	3 episodes
2021	Vera	Jack Kassin	Episode: "Recovery"
2021	The Outlaws	Marcus	Episode: #1.3
2023	The Cleaner	Vince	Episode: "The Statue"
2023	The Power of Parker	Vinnie	Episode: #1.5 "White Goods"
2023	Casualty	Alvin	Season 37 Episode: #32
2023	Brassic	Billy Baileaf	Episode: #4 "Sweet 16"
2024	G'wed	Mr. Meacher	2 episodes
2024	The Responder	Matty	3 episodes
2024–present	Hollyoaks	Donny Clark/Mick Johnson	
2026	The Cage	Paul	4 episodes
