= Annie Miles =

English actress (born 1958)

Annie Miles (born 5 May 1958 in Tynemouth) is an English actress who is best known for her roles in television soap opera. She played Sue Sullivan (née Harper) in Brookside from 1987 to 1991, and Maria Simons Starr in Family Affairs from 1997 to 2000.

Annie lives between London & Suffolk and is married to Bobby Aitken, a sound designer for musical theatre with whom she has two children.
