= Brian Regan (actor) =

British actor (born 1957)

- Born: Brian James Regan; 2 October 1957 (age 68); Prescot, Lancashire, England
- Occupation: Actor

Brian James Regan (born 2 October 1957 in Prescot, Lancashire) is an English actor known for playing Terry Sullivan, one of the lead roles in the Channel 4 soap Brookside, during the 1980s and 1990s. He has also had small parts in other television series. In 1988, he won the Christmas special of Wheel of Fortune (series 1, episode 11).

On 12 April 2011, Regan was charged with the murder of a doorman in Liverpool and remanded in custody to await trial. He was cleared of the murder early the following year but was still imprisoned for nearly five years on a lesser charge.

== Early life and career ==
Regan attended Yew Tree Comprehensive School in Dovecot. He trained as an actor at the Liverpool Playhouse and, in addition to his role in Brookside, has also appeared on television in The Bill, Paparazzo and Murphy's Mob. He also appeared in the early years of Sky TV's Soccer AM as 'The Cat'.

He joined the cast of Brookside in 1982, first appearing in episode six. The character of Terry Sullivan was featured in some of the soap's most dramatic storylines, and he was a regular mainstay of the soap until he left the series in February 1997. He had previously left the show for a short time to move to London, where he pursued his acting career, but later rejoined. His last appearance of Terry Sullivan was on the direct to video Brookside: The Lost Weekend from November 1997

== Criminal charges ==
During the weekend of the 27 February 2011 he was questioned by police over the fatal shooting of a city bouncer, an Iranian Bahman Faraji, in Aigburth, Liverpool and he was charged with murder on 12 April 2011.

On 18 April he appeared by video-link at Liverpool Crown Court. Along with two other men, he was due to next appear on 8 July.

He was also charged in late March 2011 with two counts of possession with intent to supply a controlled drug and two counts of supplying a controlled drug, believed by local news press to relate to cocaine.

On 25 January 2012, Regan was sentenced to 4 years and 10 months imprisonment for his role in the murder of Bahman Faraji in February 2011. He admitted driving the gunman to and from the scene of the murder but denied that he knew that they were carrying a sawn-off shotgun or that they intended to kill Faraji. Part of his sentence was for perverting the course of justice as he initially lied about his part in the murder by providing a false alibi.

In 2019, he was seen back on screen in an episode of Moving On.
